= Association of Persecutees of the Nazi Regime – Federation of Antifascists =

Political confederation in Germany

- Vereinigung der Verfolgten des Naziregimes – Bund der Antifaschistinnen und Antifaschisten
- Formation: March 1947
- Headquarters: Berlin
- Location: Germany
- Members: 6,000 (2016)
- Website: vvn-bda.de

The Association of Persecutees of the Nazi Regime – Federation of Antifascists (German: Vereinigung der Verfolgten des Naziregimes – Bund der Antifaschistinnen und Antifaschisten) (VVN-BdA) is a German political confederation founded in 1947 and based in Berlin. The VVN-BdA, formerly the VVN, emerged from victims' associations in Germany founded by political opponents to Nazism after the Second World War and the end of the Nazi rule in Germany.

During the Cold War, the VVN was the subject of political struggles between East and West Germany. In the West, the association was seen as dominated by the Communist Party; in the East, the VVN was accused of spying. In 1953, East Germany banned the VVN and founded the Committee of Antifascist Resistance Fighters in its place.

Since 2002, the association has extended to cover the whole of Germany, including camp communities of former prisoners of the concentration camps as incorporated associations. The VVN-BdA claims to be the biggest and oldest anti-fascist organization in the Federal Republic of Germany.

== Purpose of the association ==
The VVN-BdA presents itself as an independent organisation, with a focus of resistance against fascism and war as its defining moral principle, however in West Germany, the organisation was seen as taking its lead from the Communist Party of Germany (KPD) in the 1950s, and after 1968 of being controlled from the top by German Communist Party (DKP) members. Nowadays, the spread of membership continues to come from a wide range of political elements, including orthodox communists, members of The Left party, and political independents, along with members of Green Party and Social Democratic Party (in spite of a dissenting resolution adopted by the Social Democratic Party (SPD), which remained in force till 25 October 2010).

The VVN-BdA is a member of the International Federation of Resistance Fighters – Association of Anti-Fascists.

== History ==
=== Establishment of the organisation ===
With the end of World War II, self-help groups of former resistance fighters were founded in "anti-fascist committees", known as "Antifas", involving working class militants, in particular but not only Communists, which were banned immediately by the military administrations of each of the British and American occupation zones for being far politically left. They supported attending to 200,000 up to 250,000 former political persecutees by the social administrations instead.

By 26 June 1945, an "association of political prisoners and persecutees of the Nazi system" had been founded in Stuttgart, and in the following weeks and months, there were regional groups of ex-political prisoners and other persecuted individuals formed with the permission of the allied forces, in each of the four occupation zones. Their concern, next to providing social help for those in need, was to bring the voice of resistance, the political and moral weight of the opponents of the Nazi regime to form a new anti-fascist, democratic Germany.

The initiative for the VVN came from representatives of the labour parties, which had committees that provided direct assistance to people persecuted or victimised by the Nazis, whether political, religious, or racially based. It set out to be a multi-party organisation, an umbrella group for everyone, regardless of political affiliation, according to its manifesto in August 1946.

Representatives from all the regional organisations in the four occupied zones met in Frankfurt am Main from 20–22 July 1946 and adopted a charter for the "Society of People Persecuted by the Nazi Regime". On 26 October 1946, the first state organisations was founded in Düsseldorf, North Rhine-Westphalia. Others soon followed.

From 15–17 March 1947, the 1st Inter-zonal States Conference of the VVN convened in Frankfurt am Main with 68 delegates from all four of the occupied zones and the city of Berlin and formed an organisation representing all of Germany, with a similarly constituted council and two co-chairmen at the helm.

On the territory of the Soviet occupation zone, the SMAD orders no. 28 (from 28 January 1947) and no. 92 (from 22 April 1947) put the compensation on solid formal ground. The SMAD order no. 228 (from 30 July 1946) nullified the judgements in political proceedings of the Nazis and therefore made judicial rehabilitations easier; later decrees on regaining the German citizenship made the returning to Germany easier for expatriated emigrants. A similar, but however hesitant development was pursued by the administrations in the western occupation zones.

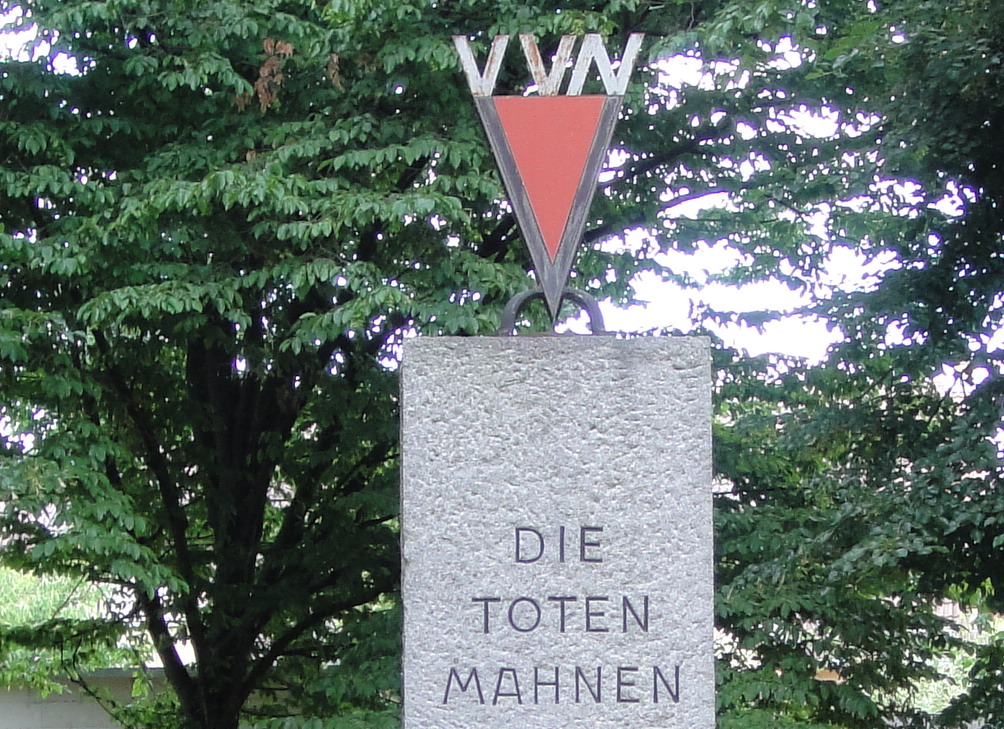
This VVN memorial in Teltow incorporates a red triangle to symbolize political prisoners.

The "red triangle", the sign sewn on the concentration camp uniforms of political prisoners, was adopted as the symbol for the VVN. The aim of the organisation was to support former prisoners, but the founding VVN members uniformly did not want to limit themselves to just this purpose. Having experienced terror personally, they wanted to be true to the Buchenwald Oath, to never again let fascism become a reality, "Our motto is the extermination of Nazism to its roots. Our goal is the creation of a new world of peace and freedom".

The political confrontation of the cold war affected the VVN heavily. Kurt Schumacher, leader of the SPD, declared a resolution of incompatibility for Social Democrats, which has been abolished on 25 October 2010. Nonetheless, many SPD members remained in the VVN. Prominent Nazi opponents, such as Eugen Kogon, who were close to the Christian Democratic Union (CDU) resigned from the VVN for political reasons. These actions led to a political narrowing of the VVN, although the organization continued to seek out all Nazi opponents and victims of persecution.

=== German Democratic Republic (former East Germany) ===
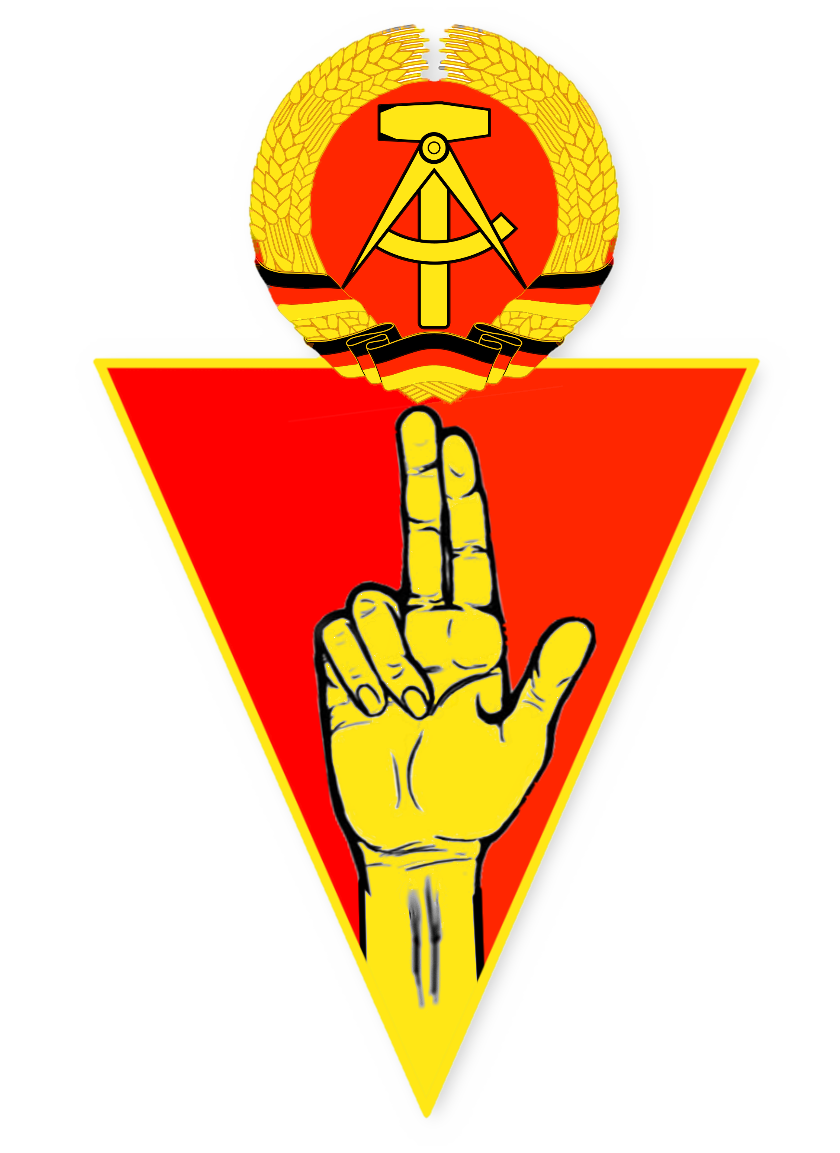
Emblem of the KdAW

In 1949 and 1950, the Stalinist purges had repercussions in the Soviet occupation zone, later to become the German Democratic Republic (GDR), with the SED accusing leading members of the VVN of being agents of the west. At the same time, in connection with the Rudolf Slánský trial in the former Czechoslovakia, the policies of the GDR leadership began to evidence an increasing anti-semitism toward the Jewish Communists who had fled to western countries after 1933. Julius Meyer, an SED member and elected member of the People's Chamber, Hans Freund and other Jewish members of the VVN fled to West Germany in December 1952 and January 1953 because of the threat of persecution. Even Leo Zuckerman, a former state secretary and co-author of the GDR constitution, fled to the west.

Without the consultation of the VVN, the decision was made on 15 January 1953, to dissolve the organization. The VVN's publishing house was dissolved and in its place the Committee of Antifascist Resistance Fighters (Komitee der antifaschistischen Widerstandskämpfer) was set up. The overnight dissolution of the VVN met little opposition from within the organization itself. The Committee maintained close contact with the VVN in the Federal Republic of Germany (FRG).

In 1990, after the democratic revolution in the GDR, the Association of Former Participants of the Anti-Fascist Resistance, Persecutees and Survivors (Interessenverband ehemaliger Teilnehmer am antifaschistischen Widerstand, Verfolgter des Naziregimes und Hinterbliebener) (IVVdN) took over as successor to the committee. In October 2002, the IVVdN merged with the West German VVN, forming one organization for all of Germany.

=== Federal Republic of Germany (former West Germany) ===
The Communists had a major influence within the organization. The organization was led by the SED and DKP till the German reunification in 1989. In 1989, all state chairmen, nearly all the main employees, as well as two-thirds of the membership of the national board and the steering committee were all members of the DKP.

The political scope during the founding years was distinctly limited by the Cold War. Compounding that, were the declaration of incompatibility by the SPD in May 1948 and the resignation of prominent Nazi adversaries Eugen Kogon, Heinz Galinski and Philipp Auerbach, which all caused the VVN to be viewed in public discourse as a "Communist front organization". Public servants risked dismissal if they remained members of the VVN, despite being survivors of Nazi terror.

The splits and resignations resulted in a numerical and political dominance of left-wing members. Former Communist Resistance fighters found in the VNN a political forum in which they could to meet legally while the KPD itself was legally banned.

A number of Bundesländer tried to ban the VVN during the 1950s. A judicial ruling forced Lower Saxony to lift its ban and in Hamburg, "VAN" was left as a "replacement" organization, but in Rhineland-Palatinate, the ban remained in effect. At the end of the 1950s, the federal government went to federal court to establish a ban against the VVN at the national level. The opening of the trial erupted into political scandal when it was revealed that the presiding judge, Senate President Prof. Dr. Werner had been an aggressive Nazi, resulting in the discontinuation of the case. The anti-communist climate continued to plague members of the VVN during the postwar era, though in sight of constitutional protection and during the 1970s, they were at times criticized by radicals.

From the outset, the VVN concerned itself with care for the victims of Nazi injustice, as well as the admonition and remembrance of the crimes of National Socialism. This included, for example, social counseling according to the federal law on compensation for victims of Nazi persecution, which came into force in 1956, but was retroactive to 1 October 1953. One section of the statute was problematic for VVN members, however. It excluded payments from anyone who advocated communism.

Since the 1960s, among the VVN's key spheres of political activity has been confrontation of old and new Nazis. The VVN has worked against SS reunions, against the National Democratic Party, and against Auschwitz denial and other forms of revisionist history.

A crucial step was the May 1971 expansion of the organization to include the "Association of Anti-fascists". This extended the possibility of membership beyond just the persecuted and their family members, to young who have felt a bond with concentration camp survivors and their legacy. The broadening of the VVN changed the organization considerably during the 1970s and 1980s.

=== Attempted ban ===
After September 1950, government employees were prohibited from joining the VVN and the Bundesregierung tried to ban the organization itself in 1951. On 2 August 1951, the police closed the VVN offices in Frankfurt am Main. Following that, came prohibitions in the states of Hamburg and Rhineland-Palatinate. Other states did not follow suit, though in Bavaria, there was an attempt, which ended with a finding by the Administrative Court in Regensburg that the VVN was not anti-constitutional. The federal government made another attempt to ban the organization in 1959, but the Federal Administrative Court of Germany broke off the process after two hearings.

The ban was repealed in Hamburg in 1960 and in Rhineland-Palatinate in 1972.

=== Extension to the Federation of Anti-fascists ===
Members of the VVN were involved in a number of debates after the war. They fought against reinstalling old Nazis as office holders, against the reemergence of Nazi organizations, against the plan to re-arm Germany, against atomic armament and against the white-washing of German history from 1933 to 1945. Initiatives of the VVN led to the erection of memorial sites, such as the development of Dachau concentration camp into a noteworthy memorial site in the mid-1960s, a project with which VVN members were significantly involved.

In 1971, the VVN expanded itself to include the Bund der Antifaschisten (Federation of Anti-fascists). In the wake of the student protests of 1968 and the growth of the right-wing extremist National Democratic Party (NPD), many young people became interested in the debate over Germany's Nazi past. The organization was also faced with a graying and declining membership and needed to invigorate itself with newer, younger members. Key themes of the 1970s and 1980s were the peace movement and anti-fascism.

=== 1989 crisis ===
In 1989, it became officially known that most of the VVN's work at the federal level was financed through funds from the GDR. With the end of this funding, came a financial crisis that brought VVN to the brink of dissolution. The full-time staff had to be laid off. According to the 1989 Verfassungsschutzbericht of Lower Saxony (page 26), until the fall of communism, all applications for full-time VVN employees had been reviewed and approved by the Chairman of the German Communist Party (DKP). The president and secretariat of the national board of the VVN-BdA resigned in January 1990. The organization then voted to continue the work with reduced means and a new organizational structure.

The ending of funding by the GDR opened the door for non-dogmatic influence; the Union became open to unaffiliated anti-fascists.

=== Merging the East and West German organizations ===
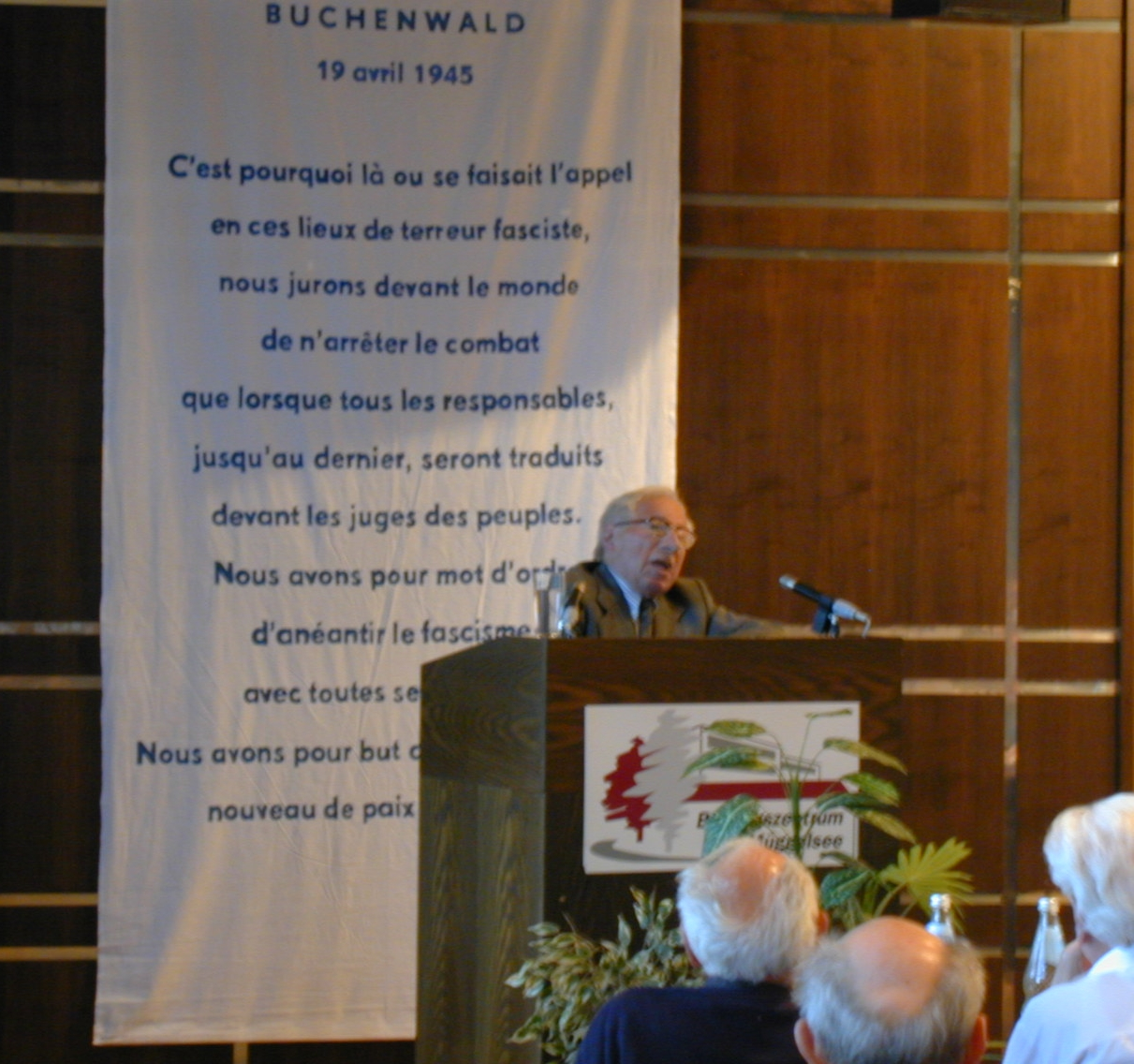
Adolphe Low, anti-fascist resistance fighter and Knight of the Legion of Honor, ANACR, Strasbourg, speaks to the delegates at the unifying congress, October 2002.

In October 2002, the West German VVN-BdA in Berlin merged with the East German Interessenverband ehemaliger Teilnehmer am antifaschistischen Widerstand, Verfolgter des Naziregimes und Hinterbliebener (Interest Group of Former Participants in the Anti-Fascist Resistance, Persecutees of the Nazi Regime, and Survivors) and the Bund der Antifaschisten (Federation of Anti-Fascists). Following the mergers, the organization's membership was around 9,000.

Representatives of domestic and foreign organizations of former persecutees, as well as guests of German organizations took part in the unification congress. Among them was Horst Schmitthenner, executive board member of IG Metall, who emphatically welcomed the VVN merger and declared, "As in the past, IG Metall will support the vital work of the VVN-BdA."

== VVN today ==
Logo of the VVN-BdA's magazine antifa

The VVN-BdA works to fight racism, xenophobia and anti-semitism; any discrimination based on national origin, race, sexual orientation or ideology and is against physical or other threats resulting from such discrimination.

The organization has under 9,000 members (as of 2003). Every two months, it publishes the magazine, antifa. The honorary president is the late Kurt Julius Goldstein.

=== Campaign to ban neo-Nazi party ===
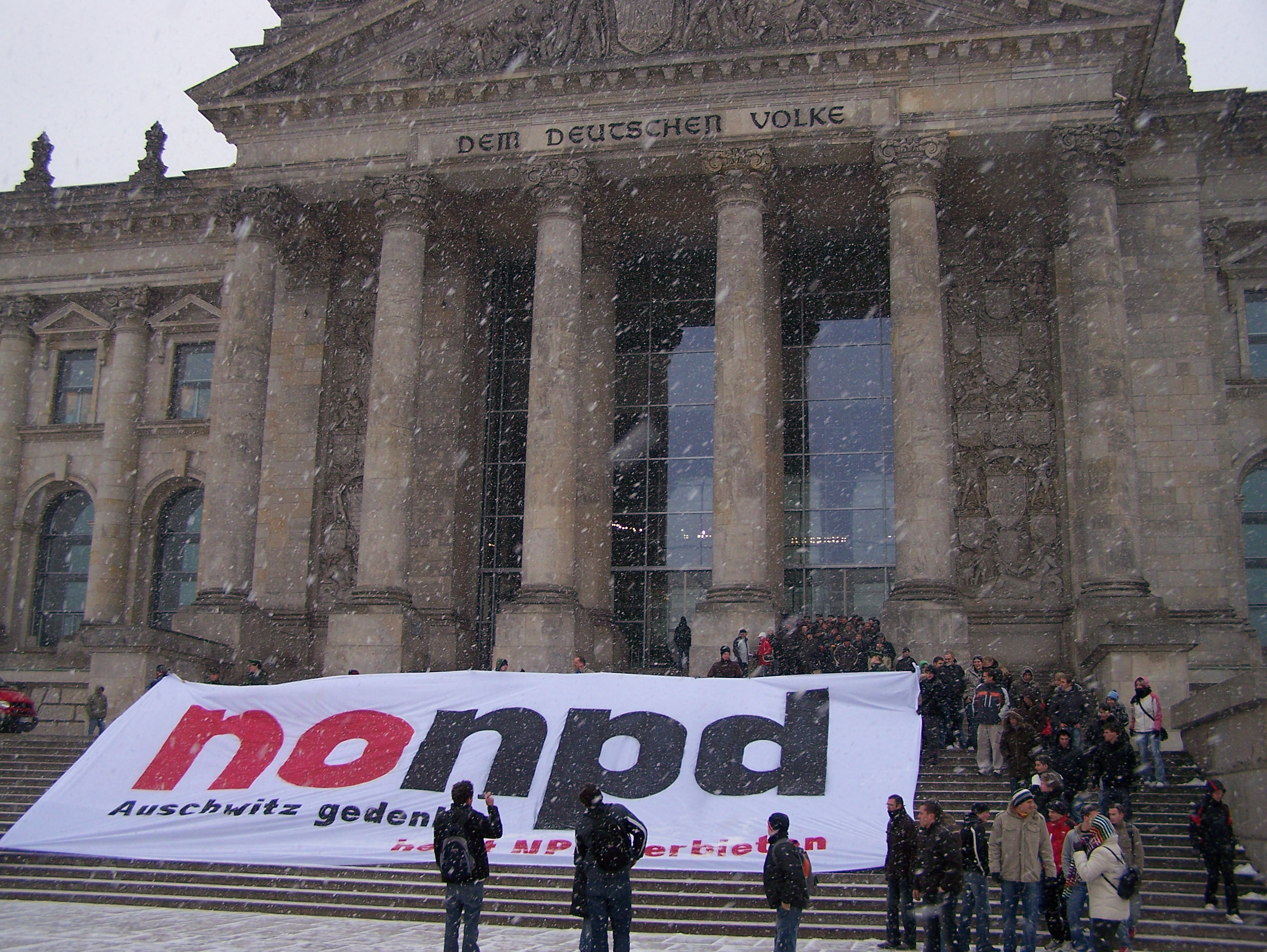
2007 demonstration at the Reichstag. The banner reads: "Auschwitz gedenken heißt NPD verbieten" ("Remembering Auschwitz means banning the NPD").

The VVN-BdA initiated a nationwide campaign in early 2007, lasting till that December, that called for a renewed effort to ban the National Democratic Party of Germany (NPD). At the heart of the campaign was a petition calling for the Bundestag to pass "a new ban against the NPD, according to Article 21, paragraph 2 of the [German] Constitution". The campaign included informational tables and events throughout Germany and had celebrity support from Hannelore Elsner, Frank Werneke and the board of 1. FC Nürnberg.

At the end of the petition campaign on 12 December 2007, the 175,455 signatures were delivered to Bundestag Vice President Petra Pau, Bundestag members Gesine Lötzsch and Dorothée Menzner of the Left Party and Niels Annen of the Social Democratic Party. A new campaign to ban the NPD began on 27 January 2009.

=== 2005 assessment by German intelligence ===
The 2005 report on political extremism by Germany's Federal Office for the Protection of the Constitution considered the VVN-BdA as "influenced by left-wing extremism". It found that

- the "Members and former members of the DKP and traditionalist members of the Left Party-PDS still hold important positions of leadership";
- "The organisation is thus still predominantly committed to orthodox/communist "anti-fascism", which argues that right-wing extremism is inherently linked to market economy systems and that state institutions in western democracies are thus more likely to support right-wing extremist activity than fight it."
- that in this view, "a socialist/communist dictatorship is the only logical alternative to 'fascist' threats".

Later reports on the Protection of the Constitution do not mention the organisation anymore. Some state reports, such as from Baden-Württemberg and Bavaria, do still mention them in their reports. The Bavarian intelligence agency regards the VVN-BdA's use of the term "anti-fascism" as meaning not just the fight against right-wing extremism, but also to mean agitation against the democratic state and its institutions. In addition, it claims the fight against right-wing extremism is a pretence under which organization tries to influence the middle class and co-opt democrats for their goals against democracy.

=== Campaign against Alternative for Germany (AfD) ===
In a January 2024 press release calling for a ban against Alternative for Germany (AfD), the VVN-BdA quoted Erich Kästner, “The events of 1933 to 1945 should have been fought by 1928 at the latest. Later, it was too late. We must not wait until the fight for freedom is called treason”. Federal chairman of the VVN-BdA, Florian Gutsche, said "The revelation of the deportation plans has brought the AfD's inhumane ideology into the spotlight of public debate. However, these plans are not new. Its platform already clearly shows that it is a völkisch-nationalist party. Through party funding, the AfD has been providing state support to Nazis for years". The VVN's harsh disapproval of the AfD is not unusual within Germany, other activist groups have also called for the AfD to be banned. Historian Jens-Christian Wagner – head of the Buchenwald and Mittelbau-Dora Memorial Foundation – said, “It cannot be that liberal democracy allows a party to participate in elections and finances its campaign that seeks to abolish liberal democracy”. In 2024 there were widespread protests against extremism in Germany, predominantly against the far-right.

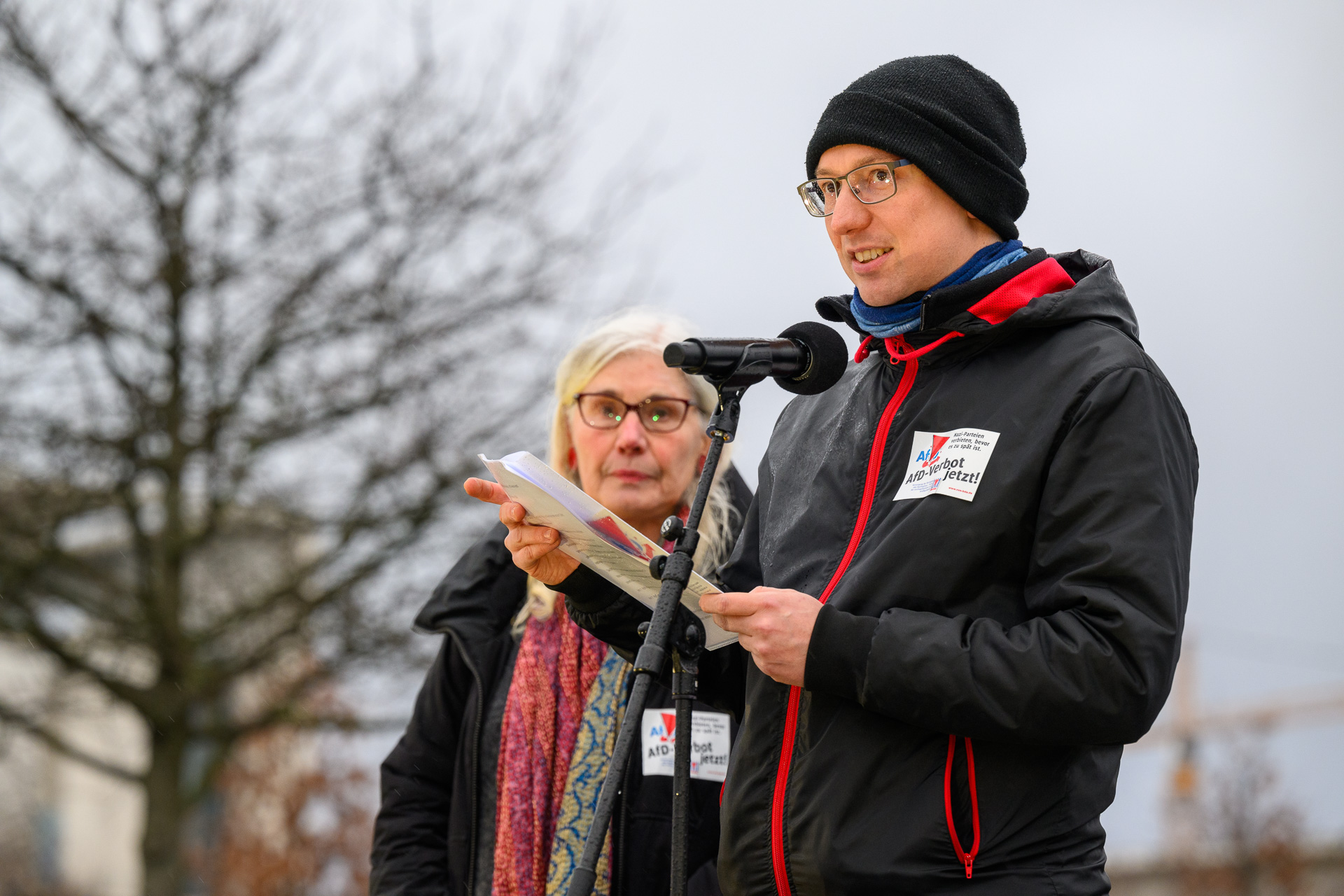
VVN-BdA chairpersons Cornelia Kerth and Florian Gutsche, at the demonstration "Hand in hand against fascism" in Berlin on 3 February 2024

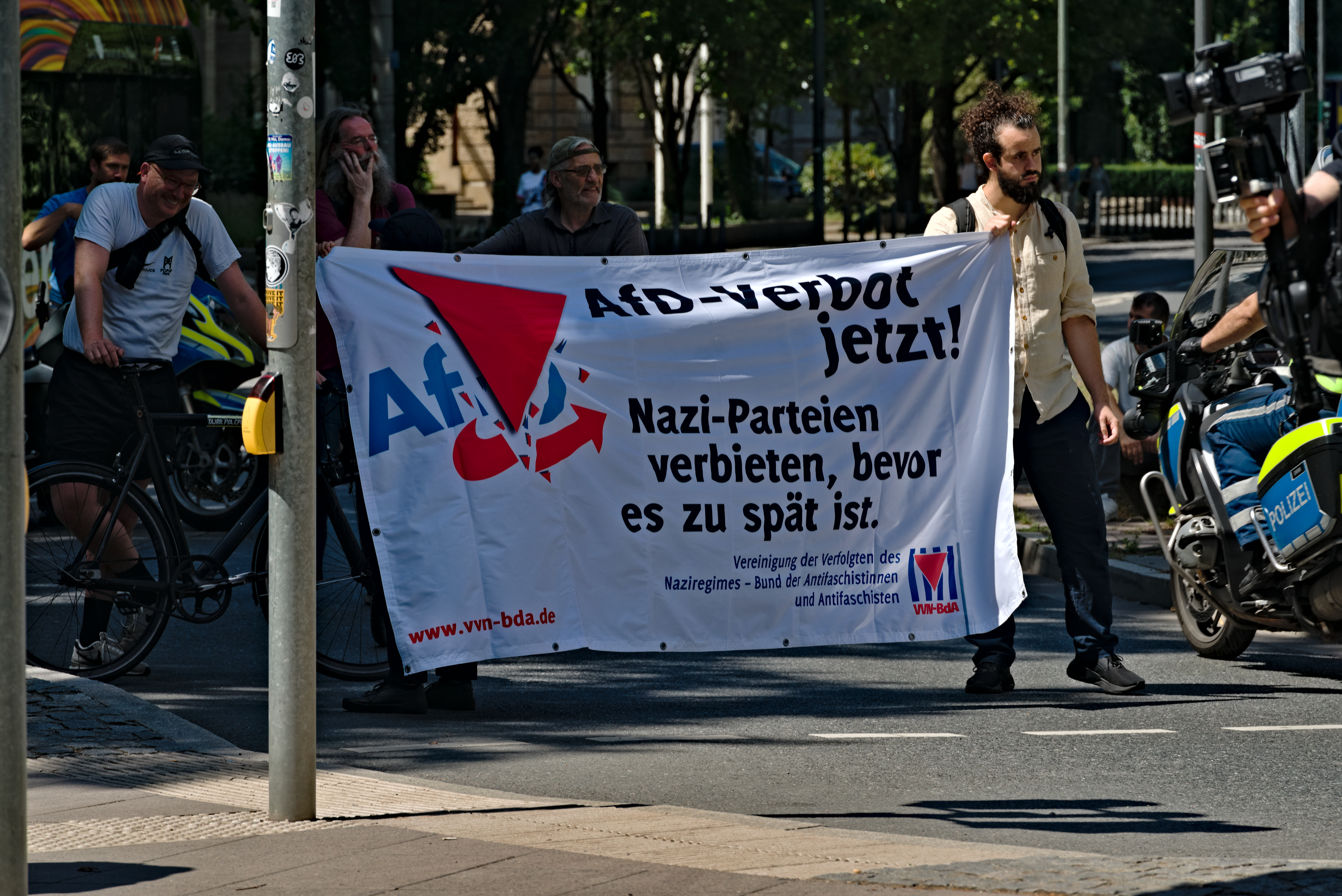
VVN-BdA banner at a protest against Alternative for Germany (AfD) in Frankfurt in 2025. Translation: "Ban the AfD now! Ban Nazi parties, before it's too late".

== Notable members ==
- Josef "Jupp" Angenfort (b. 1924), spokesman, North Rhine-Westphalia and federal committee member
- Mumia Abu-Jamal (b. 1954), American criminal, convicted for the murder of a police officer, honorary member
- Kurt Bachmann (1909–1997), 1969–1973 chairman of the DKP and co-founder of the VVN
- Ulrike Bahr (b. 1964) German politician (SPD) and since 2013 MP in the German Bundestag
- Esther Bejarano (1924–2021), Auschwitz survivor, honorary board member
- Siegfried Bibo, longtime chairman of the VVN-VdA
- Karin Binder (b. 1957), member of the Bundestag, Die Linke
- Hagen Blau (b. 1935), former diplomat and Stasi agent in the former East Germany
- Gerd Bornemann, "top of the ticket" candidate for the PDS, Landtag election 2003 in Lower Saxony
- Anneliese Buschmann (1906–1999), FDP politician
- Emil Carlebach (1914–2001), 1932 KPD, DKP, VVN steering committee
- Hans Coppi, Jr. (b. 1942), historian, chairman of the Berlin Landesverband
- Alfred Dellheim (1924–2003), chairman of the East German IVVDN
- Uwe Doering (b. 1953), electrician, member of Berlin parliament, and parliamentary manager for Die Linke in Berlin
- Ludwig Elm (b. 1934), professor of history, member of Bundestag from Thuringia, state spokesman for the VVN-BdA
- Edgar Engelhard (1917–1979), FDP politician; second mayor of Hamburg; withdrew in 1950
- Heinrich Fink (b. 1935), chairman of the VVN-BdA
- Dieter Frielinghaus (b. 1928), evangelical-reformed pastor, peace activist
- Heinz Galinski (1912–1992), second chairman (till 1948) of the VVN in Berlin
- Claudia von Gélieu (b. 1960), historian, unaffiliated (formerly SPD)
- Ottomar Geschke (1882–1957), first chairman of the VVN
- Peter Gingold (1916–2006), 1932 Young Communist League of Germany, 1937 KPD, DKP), national spokesman of the VVN-BdA
- Kurt Julius Goldstein (1914–2007), honorary chairman of the VVN-BdA, KPDSED
- Eva Gottschaldt (b. 1953), historian, unaffiliated and Protestant Christian
- Carl Helfrich (1906–1960), first editor-in-chief of the VVN newspaper, Die Tat
- Willy Hundertmark (1906–2002), co-founder of the VVN and chairman of the state VVN, Bremen, 1983–1991 (afterward, honorary chairman), 1926 KPD, later DKP
- Margarete Jung (1898–1979), East German politician
- Walter Kaufmann (1924–2021), author
- Victor Klemperer (1881–1960), novelist
- Lorenz Knorr (1921–2018), (Deutsche Friedensunion), journalist
- Kerstin Köditz (b. 1967), member of Landtag, (Die Linke) in Saxony
- Martin Löwenberg (b. 1925), Flossenbürg concentration camp survivor
- Adolf Maislinger (1903–1985), KPD, Dachau resistance group
- Dorothée Menzner (b. 1965), member of Bundestag, Die Linke
- Josef Müller (politician) (1898–1979), representative in the Weimar Republic, first chairman of the CSU
- Harry Naujoks (1901–1983), chairman, international Sachsenhausen committee
- Werner Pfennig (1937–2008), chairman VVN-BdA, 2002–2008
- Karl Raddatz (1904–1970), general secretary of the VVN in the Soviet occupation zone und co-director of the interzone secretariat of the VVN
- Joseph Cornelius Rossaint (1902–1991), president of the VVN, 1962–1991
- Heinz Schröder (VVN) (1910–1997), longtime chairman of the VVN-VdA in West-Berlin
- Hans Schwarz (VVN) ( ), co-director of the inter-zone secretariat of the VVN
- Robert Siewert (1887–1973), first Minister of the Interior, GDR
- Walter Vielhauer (1909–1986) mayor of Heilbronn (KPD, later DKP)
- Maria Wachter (1910–2010), honorary chairman of the VVN-BdA in North Rhine-Westphalia
- Christel Wegner (b. 1947), DKP
- Heinrich Feisthauer (1898–1964), survivor of Sachsenhausen concentration camp

== See also ==
- Red triangle (badge) § After WWII
- NSPM-7 – 2025 US President Trump national security directive (Trump government terrorism legislation against the left)

== Sources ==
- Wolfgang Rudzio, Die Erosion der Abgrenzung. Zum Verhältnis zwischen der demokratischen Linken und Kommunisten in der Bundesrepublik Deutschland. Opladen 1988 (p. 111), ISBN 3-531-12045-X (in German)
- Elke Reuter and Detlef Hansel, Das kurze Leben der VVN von 1947 bis 1953: Die Geschichte der Verfolgten des Nazi-Regimes in der SBZ und DDR. Berlin 1997, ISBN 3-929161-97-4 (in German)
- Kurt Faller and Bernd Wittich, Abschied vom Antifaschismus. Frankfurter (Oder) 1997, ISBN 3-930842-03-3 (in German)
- Ulrich Schneider, Zukunftsentwurf Antifaschismus. 50 Jahre Wirken der VVN für „eine neue Welt des Friedens und der Freiheit“. Bonn 1997, ISBN 3-89144-237-8 (in German)
- Bundesamt für Verfassungsschutz: „Vereinigung der Verfolgten des Naziregimes-Bund der Antifaschistinnen und Antifaschisten“ (VVN-BdA), Cologne, June 1997 (in German)
- Der Bundesminister des Innern (Publ.): Bedeutung und Funktion des Antifaschismus, Bonn 1990 (in German)
- Bettina Blank, "Vereinigung der Verfolgten des Naziregimes - Bund der Antifaschistinnen und Antifaschisten“ (VVN-BdA)" Jahrbuch Extremismus & Demokratie. 12, Baden-Baden 2000, pp. 224-239
