= Hans Coppi Jr. =

German historian

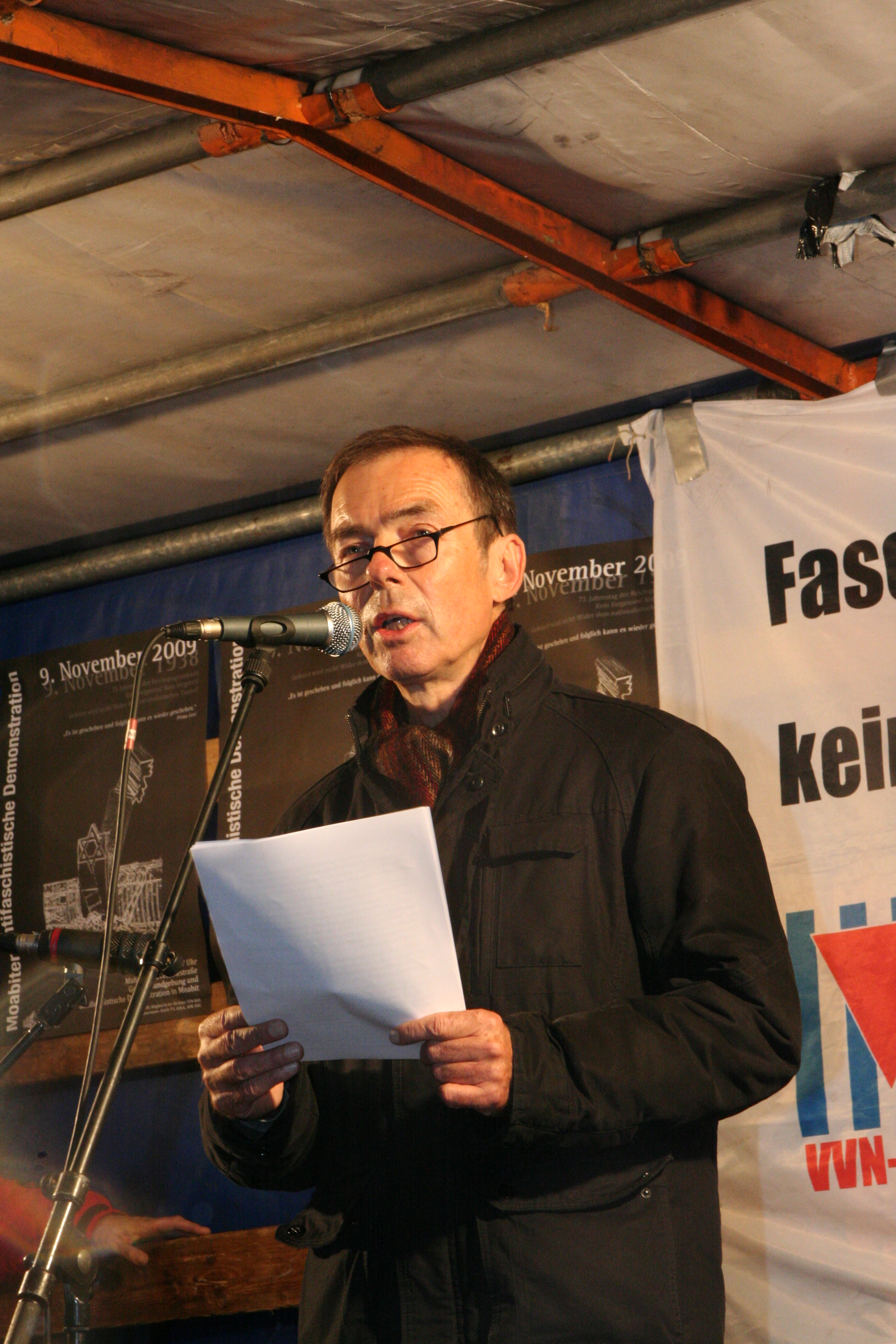
Hans Coppi Jr. at a rally on the 71st anniversary of Kristallnacht in Berlin-Moabit

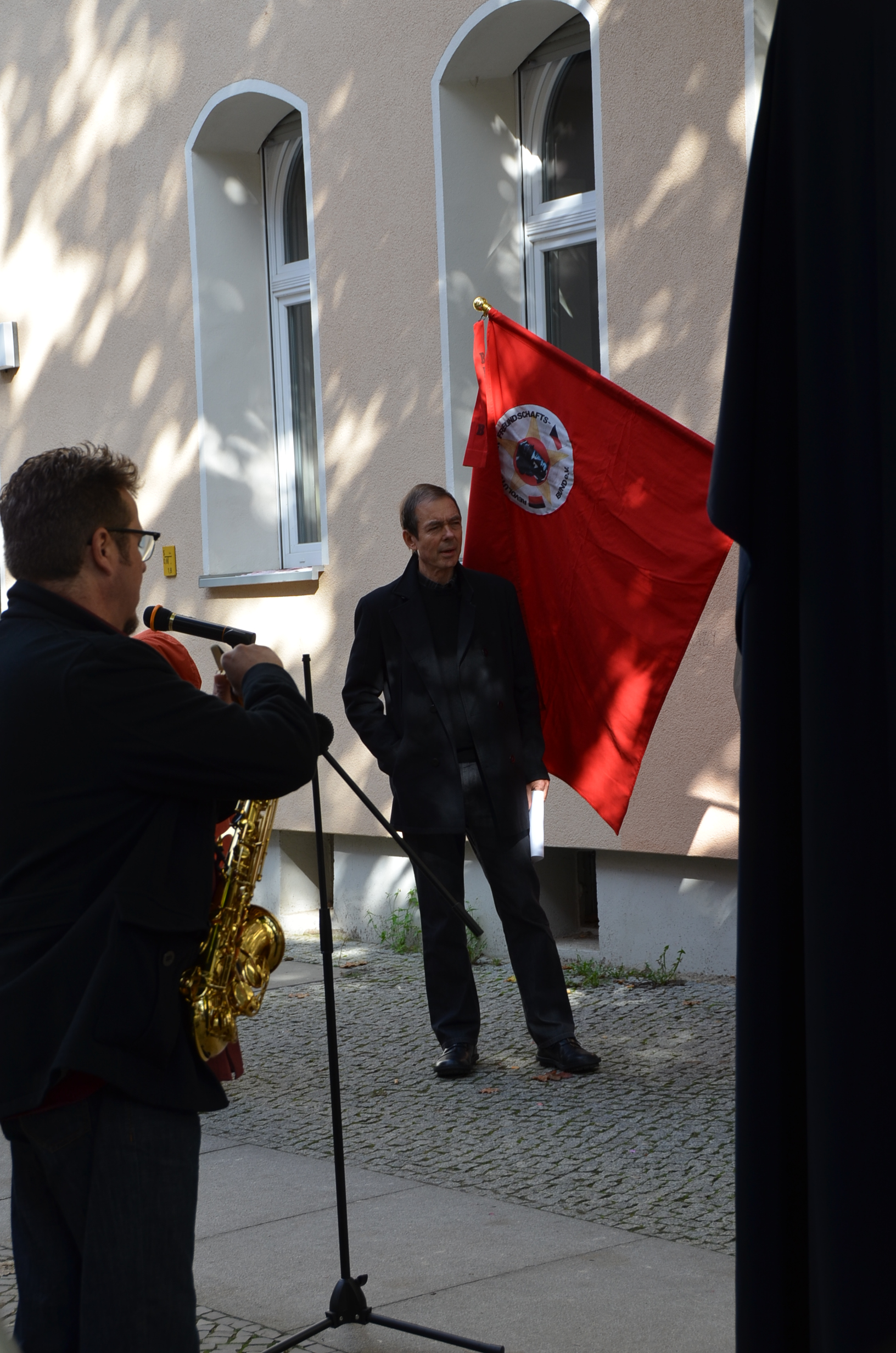

Hans Coppi Jr. (born 27 November 1942) is a German historian. His parents, Hilde and Hans Coppi, were active in the German Resistance and were both executed by the Nazis.

== Biography ==
=== Early life ===
Coppi was born at the Barnimstrasse women's prison in Berlin. His parents were arrested on 12 September 1942 in Schrimm (now Śrem, Poland). His paternal grandparents, maternal grandmother and one uncle were also arrested around this time. At the time of his parents' arrest, his mother was hochschwanger, literally "highly pregnant". His father was convicted and executed shortly after his birth. Coppi's father was allowed to see him in his mother's arms one last time before being executed. His mother attempted to get clemency, but it was denied by Adolf Hitler in July 1943. She was allowed to nurse her son until shortly before her execution on 5 August 1943 at Plötzensee Prison, when Coppi was just eight months old. Coppi grew up with his grandparents.

=== Education and career ===
After studying economics in college, Coppi worked at an East German foreign trade company for machine tools as a party secretary of the ruling SED party. From 1984 to 1987, he was employed by the Berlin district leadership of the Socialist Unity Party (SED). After a year of study abroad in Moscow, he went to the Harnack/Schulze-Boysen Research Center at the Academy of Sciences in the German Democratic Republic (GDR). Writing his dissertation on Harro Schulze-Boysen, he got his doctorate at Technische Universität Berlin in 1992. He has spent considerable time devoted to the study of the Red Orchestra and the German Resistance.

Although his parents are often identified as having been members of the Red Orchestra, Coppi himself says the term is a "catch-all" term the Nazis used to derogatorily refer to all Widerstand groups and it was used even after 1945 to defame them as Soviet spies.

From 1990 to 1994, he was a researcher at the German Resistance Memorial Center in Berlin. From 1997 to 2002, he was the project director for the development of electronic archival resources at the Sachsenhausen Memorial. Coppi has been a freelance contributor at the German Resistance Memorial Center since 2003 and since 2004, the state chairman of the Union of Persecutees of the Nazi Regime in Berlin.

Coppi was an honored guest at a Brussels program commemorating the 65th anniversary of the 13 December 1941, 2:30 a.m. arrests in Brussels of members of the Red Orchestra. At that event, Coppi said,

After 1945, the members of the Abwehr, Gestapo and Reichskriegsgericht were never held accountable for their crimes against humanity. On the contrary, they were in demand as interlocutors for western intelligence agencies and made sure that those they had sentenced to death and killed in detention were once again defamed as spies and traitors. —Hans Coppi in Brussels, 13 December 2006

Coppi is married to the gallery owner, Helle Coppi. He has three daughters and lives in Berlin.

== Selected list of books and articles ==
- Sowjetische Kriegsgefangene im Konzentrationslager Sachsenhausen, in: Jahrbuch für Forschungen zur Geschichte der Arbeiterbewegung, No. I/2003. (in German)
- Harro Schulze-Boysen - Wege in den Widerstand, Fölbach Verlag: Koblenz (1995), 2nd Edition ISBN 3-923532-28-8 (in German)
- Geertje Andresen (Ed.), Dieser Tod paßt zu mir. Harro Schulze-Boysen - Grenzgänger im Widerstand. Briefe 1915-1942 ("This death becomes me" Harro Schulze-Boysen — Border crossers in Resistance, Letters 1915-1942) Aufbau Verlag, Berlin (1999) ISBN 3-351-02493-2 (in German)
- Libertas Schulze-Boysen und die Rote Kapelle. (Begleitheft zur Ausstellung Libertas Schulze-Boysen und die Rote Kapelle; eine Ausstellung der Gedenkstätte Deutscher Widerstand Berlin auf Schloss & Gut Liebenberg); Berlin (2004) (in German)
- (Editor) Elektronische Erschließung archivalischer Quellen in Gedenkstätten. Contributions to the international workshops at the Sachsenhausen Memorial and Museum, 23–24 March 2001. Münster. Hamburg, London (2002) (in German)
- (Editor, with Susanne Römer) Aufbruch - Dokumentation einer Zeitschrift zwischen den Fronten. Foreword by Peter Steinbach and Susanne Römer. Commentary by Hans Coppi Jr. Koblenz (2001) (in German)
- (Editor, with Jürgen Danyel and Johannes Tuchel), Die Rote Kapelle im Widerstand gegen Hitler. Writings from the collection of the German Resistance Memorial Center, Berlin: Edition Hentrich (1992) ISBN 3-89468-110-1 (in German)
- (Editor, with Nicole Warmbold) 60 Jahre Vereinigung der Vereinigung der Verfolgten des Naziregimes. ("60 Years, Union of Persecutees of the Nazi Regime, textbook on the history and current status of the VVN." Publ.: VVN-BdA Berlin (2007) ISBN 978-3-00-021280-2 / 3-00-021280-9 (in German)
- (Editor, with Nicole Warmbold) Der zweite Sonntag im September - Gedenken und Erinnern an die Opfer des Faschismus, zur Geschichte des ODF-Tages. Publication accompanying exhibition, "The Second Sunday in September – The History of Victims of Fascism Day" (Der zweite Sonntag im September - Zur Geschichte des OdF-Tages). Foreword by Kurt Julius Goldstein, Berlin (2006) ISBN 978-3-00-019609-6 / 3-00-019609-9 (in German)
- (With Jürgen Danyel) Der „Gegner“-Kreis im Jahre 1932/33 - ein Kapitel aus der Vorgeschichte des Widerstandes. Conference from 4–6 May 1990, Publishers: Evangelische Akademie Berlin and Evangelisches Bildungswerk Berlin (1990) (in German)
- Die "Rote Kapelle" im Spannungsfeld von Widerstand und nachrichtendienstlicher Tätigkeit. (in German)

== See also ==
- Red Orchestra
- List of Germans who resisted Nazism
