= Pia Zimmermann =

German politician (born 1956)

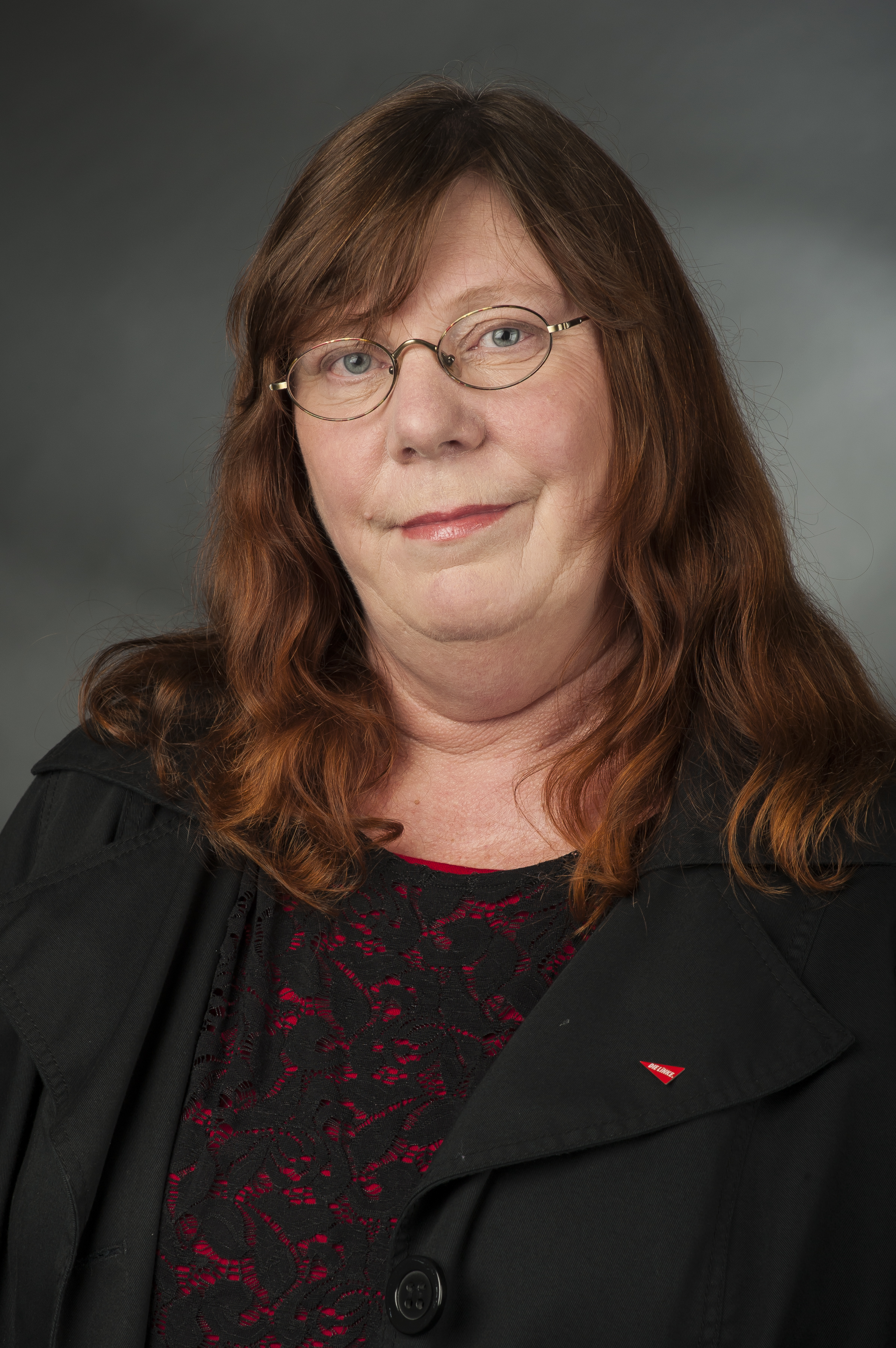
- Pia Zimmermann in 2014

Member of the Bundestag
- In office 2013–2021

Personal details
- Born: 17 September 1956 (age 69) Braunschweig, West Germany (now Germany)
- Party: The Left

Pia Zimmermann (born 17 September 1956) is a German politician. Born in Braunschweig, Lower Saxony, she represents Die Linke (The Left). She was a member of the Bundestag from the state of Lower Saxony from 2013 until 2021.

== Life ==
Zimmermann graduated from secondary school in 1972, followed by a commercial apprenticeship which she completed in 1975. After completing her apprenticeship, she passed her school-leaving examination on the second educational pathway and studied social services from 1980 to 1984. After her studies, she worked as a staff member in disability aid until 1999. She was job-seeking until 2005 and trained as a media designer. After completing this training, she worked in the constituency office of Dorothée Menzner, a member of the Bundestag. She was selected to the Bundestag at the 2013 German federal election. She was a member of the Health Committee.
