= International concentration camp committees =

Organizations for Nazi concentration camp survivors

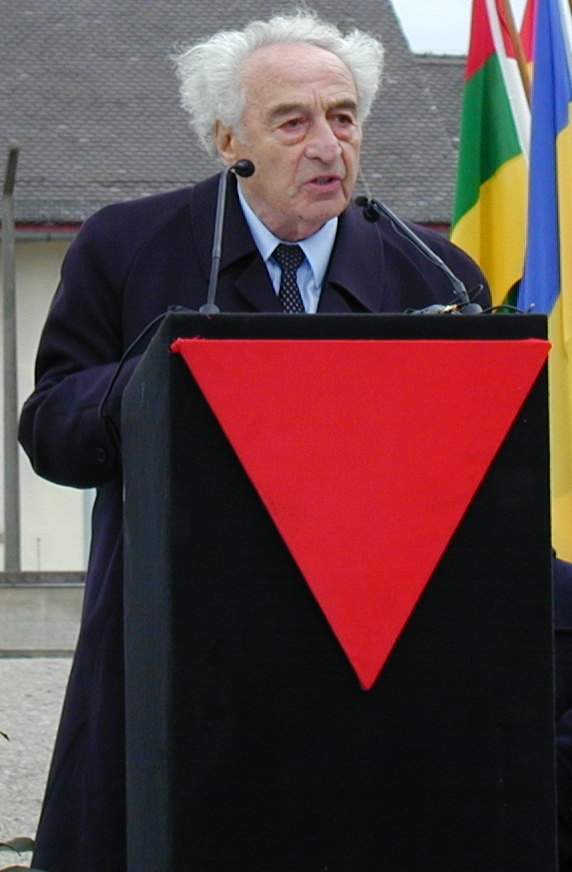
Max Mannheimer, giving an address at the former Dachau concentration camp, May 5, 2002

International concentration camp committees are organizations composed of former inmates of the various Nazi concentration camps, formed at various times, primarily after the Second World War. Although most survivors have since died and those who are still alive are generally octogenarians, the committees are still active.

== Committees' history and purpose ==
During the Nazi era, there were active, underground resistance organizations at several of the camps, such as those at Sachsenhausen, Buchenwald and Dachau. After liberation, these groups became the foundation of post-war survivor organizations for their respective camps.

The concentration camp committees are international organizations because their members come from and live in many different countries. The purpose of the committees is to educate the world about what was done under the Third Reich regarding the arrest and deportation of religious, political and social groups considered "undesirable" by the National Socialists. They also serve to care for the survivors of Nazi brutality, and finally, the committees facilitate communication and cooperation among survivors.

The committees' efforts have resulted in the establishment of numerous camp memorials and commemorative events and displays.

== Appeal in the new century ==
Held under the auspices of the International Auschwitz Committee in Berlin, there was a meeting of the presidents of the international camp committees from January 24–27, 2009.

A document was produced under the auspices of the International Auschwitz Committee that was signed by representatives of ten different Nazi concentration camps in Berlin on January 25, 2010. It refers to the pledge taken by survivors to work for peace and freedom, to remember the past and work to keep fascism from gaining ascendancy and noting the thinning ranks of their own members, it calls on young people to take up the work for future generations.

== List of international concentration camp committees ==
- International Auschwitz Committee
- World Federation of Bergen-Belsen Associations
- International Buchenwald Committee
- International Dachau Committee
- International Dachau Sub-Camps Committee
- International Flossenbürg Committee
- Comité International de Mauthausen
- International Committee Mittelbau-Dora
- International Neuengamme Committee
- International Ravensbrück Committee
- International Sachsenhausen Committee
- KLB Club
- International Natzweiler Committee

== Notable members of camp committees ==
- Jean-Aimé Dolidier (1906–1971), a French trade unionist and survivor of Neuengamme. He was president of the Amicale Internationale de Neuengamme and a member of the memorial site commission, that established a monument there in 1953.
- Hermann Langbein (1912–1995), an Austrian resistance fighter against Nazism and a historian. While in confinement, he led groups of resisters at several concentration camps. After 1945, he was the General Secretary of the International Auschwitz Committee and later the secretary of the Comité International des Camps. In the mid-1960s, he and Fritz Bauer played an important role in the Frankfurt Auschwitz Trials.
- Edmond Michelet, 1962 to 1964, President of the European Documentation and Information Centre. Served under De Gaulle and others as Ministre des Anciens combattants (Minister for War Veterans).
- Oskar Müller, Lagerältester in Dachau, later first Minister of Labor in Hesse.
- Harry Naujoks (1901–1983) – Lagerältester and chronicler of Sachsenhausen.
- Marcel Paul, (1900–1982), French trade unionist, member of the French parliament and survivor of Buchenwald. He and Henri Manhès founded a French organization, the Fédération nationale des déportés et internés résistants et patriotes in October 1945.
- Marie-Claude Vaillant-Couturier, Résistance, resistance at (Auschwitz-Birkenau), witness at Nuremberg Trials.

== See also ==
- Elie Wiesel
- Kurt Julius Goldstein
- Max Mannheimer
- La Fondation pour la Mémoire de la Déportation
- List of Nazi concentration camps
