= Roman Kent =

Polish Holocaust survivor (1929–2021)

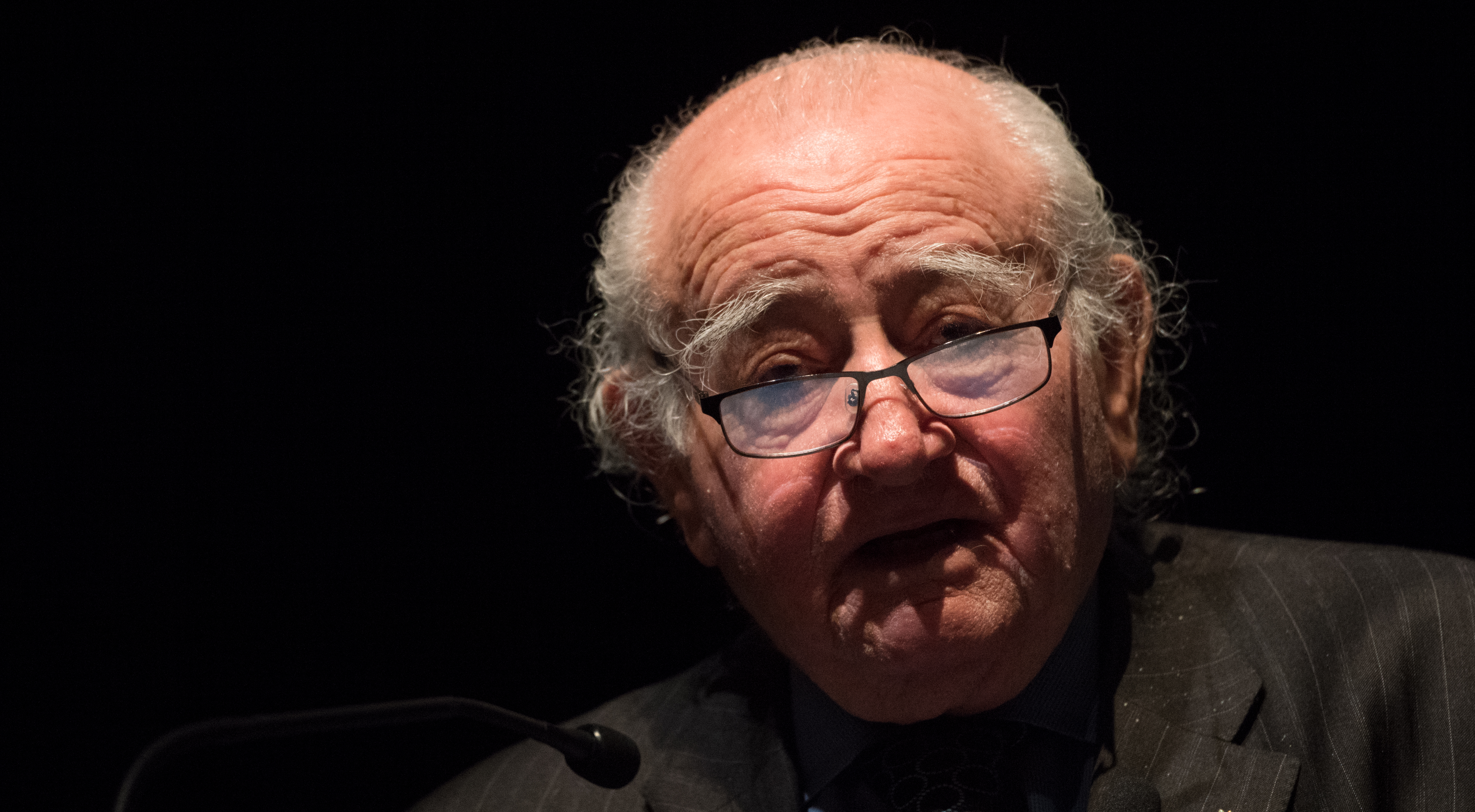
- Born: 18 April 1929; Łódź, Poland
- Died: 21 May 2021 (aged 92); New York City, United States
- Occupation: Holocaust Survivor

Roman R. Kent (18 April 1929 – 21 May 2021) was a Polish Holocaust survivor. He was a Łódź Ghetto and Auschwitz Concentration Camp inmate. He was president of the International Auschwitz Committee.

Kent died in New York City, United States on 21 May 2021, aged 92.

== Works ==
Roman Kent wrote his autobiography entitled "Courage Was My Only Option: The Autobiography of Roman Kent" which was published in 2008 in New York by Vantage Press. He wrote the children's book "My dog Lala" about Lala, his much beloved she-dog while being a young boy in Poland, being forced into the Łódź ghetto with his family after Poland was attacked and occupied by Nazi Germany. It's the story about the love between a boy and his dog, who was taken from him by the German occupiers.

== Commemoration ==
Based on Kent's children's book "My dog Lala" and his autobiography "Courage Was My Only Option", Polish storyteller Beata Frankowska has prepared the story "Lala. The Story of a Miracle" about Kent's childhood in Łódź before World War II and family's stay in the ghetto, and the boy's and his siblings' friendship with dog Lala. It premiered at the 18th International Storytelling Festival in November 2023 in Warsaw with accordion player and singer Robert Lipka providing the accompaniment for Frankowska's storytelling and the Folkovo group joining him in a Hebrew and a Yiddish song.
