= Adolf Maislinger =

German Resistance member and concentration camp survivor

Adolf Maislinger (December 9, 1903 – April 26, 1985) was a member of the German Resistance and was a survivor of Dachau concentration camp.

== Early years ==
Maislinger was born on December 9, 1903, in Munich. He came from a Social Democratic Party household. He first joined the youth group of the Social Democratic Party, the Sozialistische Arbeiter-Jugend, at the age of 14; later, he joined the SPD. As the conflicts with the National Socialists intensified in Munich during the 1920s, he joined the Reichsbanner Schwarz-Rot-Gold. During this time, Maislinger helped defend the offices of the Münchener Post from attack by "brown shirts".

In 1931, he joined the Communist Party of Germany (KPD). At the end of 1932, just before the Nazis rose to power, the KPD warned its functionaries to identify as many homes as possible where they could go into hiding, should the need present itself. Two months later, in February 1933, Maislinger sought refuge by friends. He became a courier using the pseudonym "Bertl" and maintained contact with KPD members in Prague and Zürich. He also gave refuge to friends who needed to go into hiding. He met friends at night, riding on a bicycle, pistol under his jacket. After one of his friends was arrested and severely beaten, he betrayed the entire group.

== Betrayal and imprisonment ==
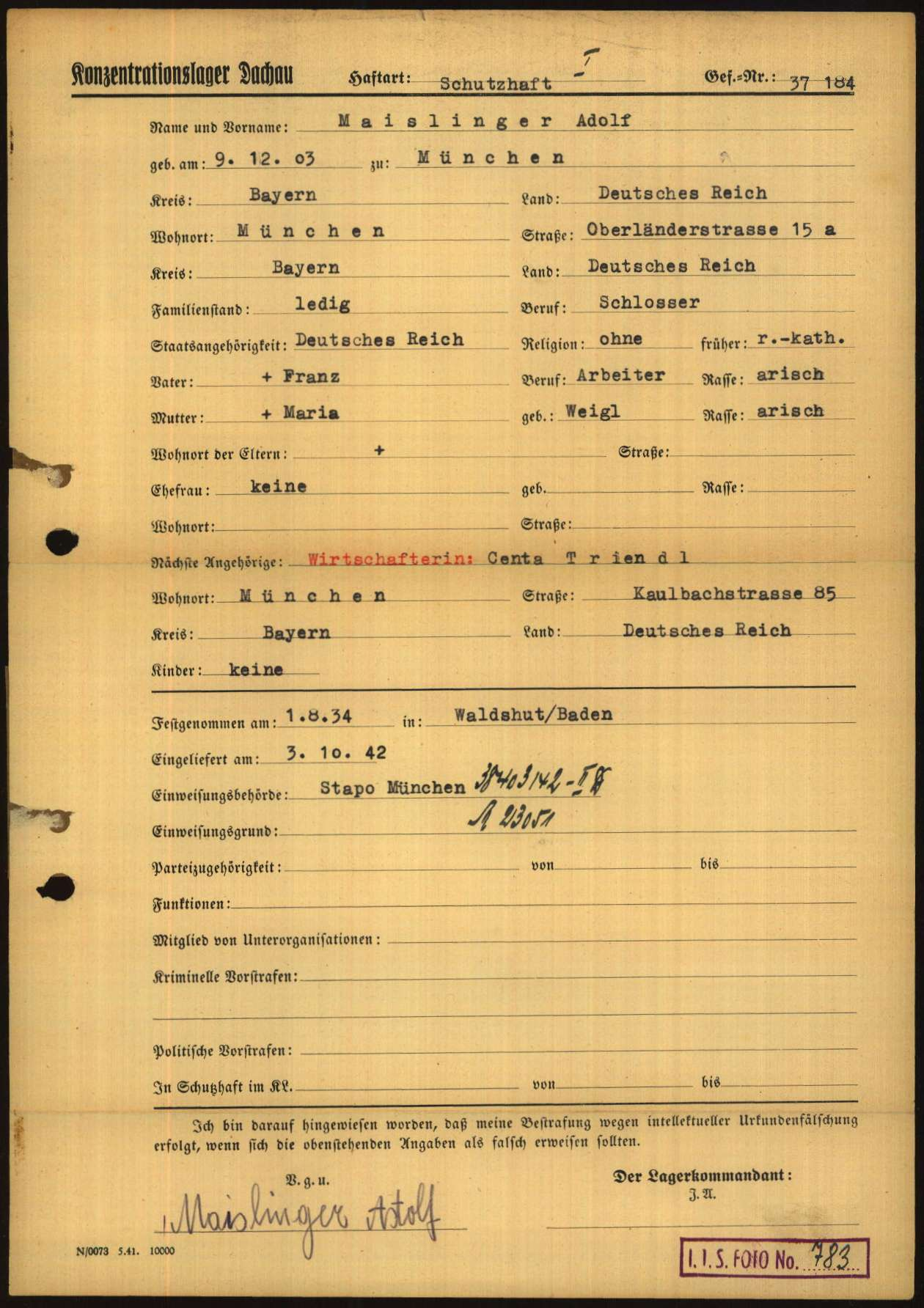
Registration form of Adolf Maislinger as a prisoner at Dachau Nazi Concentration Camp

Maisingler was able to escape to Switzerland, but in 1934, the KPD ordered him to back to Germany to carry out party work in the Ruhr area. He was arrested on the border and sent to Munich to the police prison on Ettstraße. In 1935, using a 72-page document detailing the evidence, he and his friends were tried at the Volksgerichtshof. After three days, Maislinger was sentenced to eight years' hard labor in a Zuchthaus for "preparation for high treason". Rather than being released when this time was up, however, the Gestapo issued an order on September 8, 1942, to send him to Dachau in preventive detention.

His old friends from Munich were already there. There, Communist comrades from Munich helped him get a job with the disinfection unit. The resulting freedom of action allowed him to become active in the Resistance again. Speaking of the liberation of Dachau, Maislinger said,

It was a miracle and at the same time, a shock. The other prisoners, my friends, came over to me. Some came running, others could only crawl. At some point, I began to walk, but didn't really walk anymore, I was floating. [...] I climbed up on a window ledge and watched everything from up there and cried.

== After 1945 ==
After his liberation, Adi Maislinger returned to Munich, where he was put on the city government established by the American occupying force. This didn't last long, however. On July 22, 1946, the Americans arrested all the prominent KPD members, including Maislinger and he was again imprisoned, this time in Landsberg. On August 20, 1946, the Süddeutsche Zeitung reported the release of the Communists in Landsberg, saying "It is still unclear why they were arrested."

Maisingler devoted himself to share his experiences as a prisoner in a concentration camp with young people, speaking at schools and other places. He was active with the Dachau Memorial and the Action Reconciliation Service for Peace (ARSP), reaching some 7,000 young people a year. He was also active with the Union of Persecutees of the Nazi Regime.

Maislinger died on April 26, 1985, in Munich.

== See also ==
- List of Germans who resisted Nazism

== Sources ==
- Martin Boszat and Hartmut Mehringer (Editors). Vorgeschichte, Verfolgung und Widerstand (Background, persecution and resistance) (in German)
- Bayern in der NS-Zeit – Die Parteien KPD, SPD, BVP in Verfolgung und Widerstand ("Bavaria during the Nazi era – The KPD, SPD, BVP (Bavarian People's Party) in persecution and resistance") Vol. 5, Munich (1983) (in German)
