= Committee of Antifascist Resistance Fighters =

Organization in East Germany, 1953–1990

- Komitee der Antifaschistischen Widerstandskämpfer
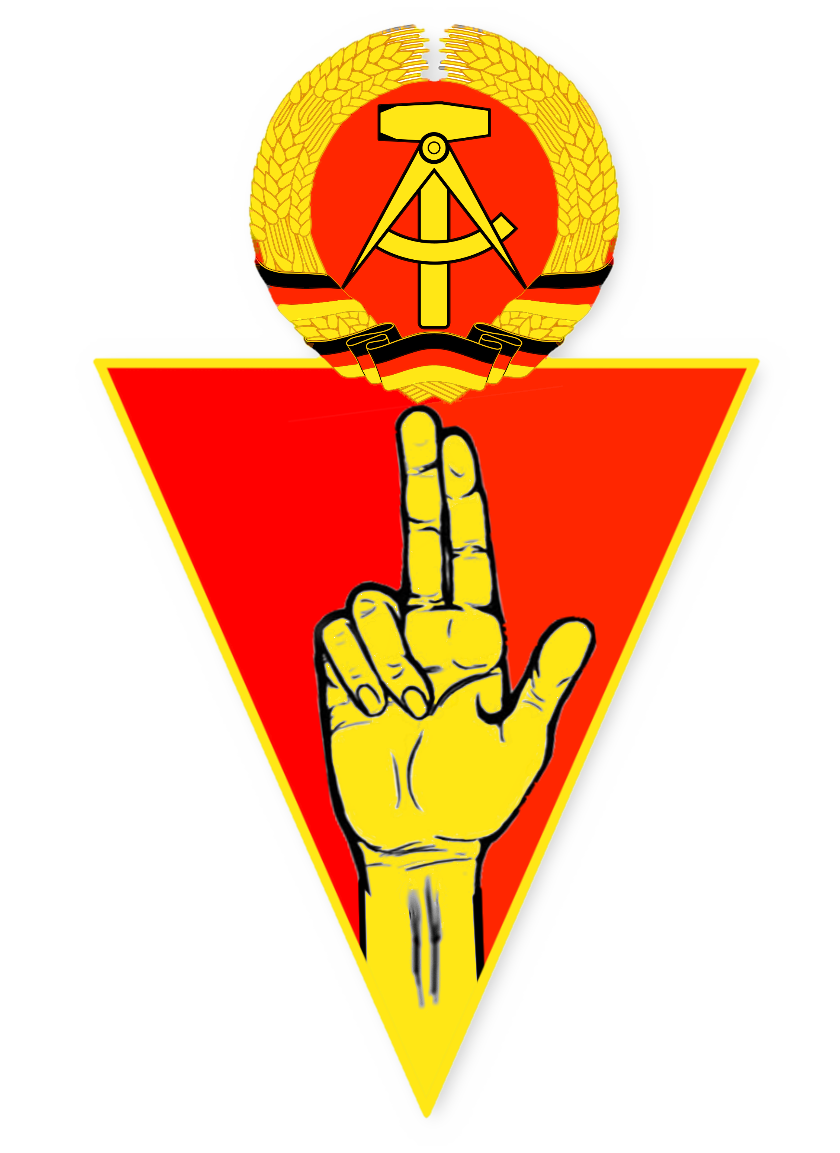
- Emblem of the Committee of Antifascist Resistance Fighters
- Formation: 1953
- Dissolved: 1990
- Headquarters: Berlin
- Location: German Democratic Republic
- Affiliations: International Federation of Resistance Fighters – Association of Anti-Fascists

The Committee of Antifascist Resistance Fighters (German: Komitee der Antifaschistischen Widerstandskämpfer, KdAW) was an anti-fascist organization in the German Democratic Republic. It was composed of both victims of the Nazi regime and resistance fighters against Nazism.

== History ==
The Committee of Antifascist Resistance Fighters (KdAW) was formed in 1953. Practically speaking, it functioned as the East German counterpart of the Union of Persecutees of the Nazi Regime (Vereinigung der Verfolgten des Naziregimes). The KdAW enjoyed a close relationship with the Socialist Unity Party, although it was not a member of the National Front. The organization played an important role in the commemoration of German resistance to Nazism and The Holocaust in East Germany. East Germany utilized such commemorative functions to emphasize the anti-fascist orientation of the state. As such, members of the KdAW often played a role in educating students about the history of the Nazi era, and participated in oral history projects.

The KdAW was organized at the national, Bezirk (district) and Kreis (county) level. It also contained a number of working groups, which brought people with similar backgrounds together. The most prominent of these were groups for survivors of various concentration camps and prisons; for example one existed for former prisoners of Brandenburg-Görden Prison. Another working group was formed for veterans of the International Brigades of the Spanish Civil War.

The KdAW was a member organization of the International Federation of Resistance Fighters – Association of Anti-Fascists.

After the Peaceful Revolution in 1990, the KdAW was reorganized into the Interessenverband ehemaliger Teilnehmer am antifaschistischen Widerstand, Verfolgter des Naziregimes und Hinterbliebener (IVVdN). The assets of the KdAW were acquired by the Treuhandanstalt, an agency charged with overseeing the economic components of German reunification. In 2002, the IVVdN became affiliated with the Union of Persecutees of the Nazi Regime.

== Membership ==
Membership in the KdAW served as a means of accessing benefits. For instance, membership made one eligible to receive the Medal for Fighters Against Fascism.

The KdAW played a role in classifying individuals as "Persecuted by the Nazi regime" (Verfolgter des Naziregimes (VdN)). Designation of a person as VdN came with special benefits, including prioritized access to healthcare and housing.

Individuals designated as VdN also received an honorary pension. This pension was set at:

- 1976: 1,000 marks
- 1985: 1,300 marks
- 1988: 1,400 marks

This honorary pension was increased for recipients of the Medal for Fighter Against Fascism. Such individuals were eligible to receive:

- 1976: 1,200 marks
- 1985: 1,500 marks
- 1988: 1,700 marks

Following German reunification, these pensions continued to be paid by the state. This is notable since East German pensions were not always honored by the reunited Germany, as was often the case for National People's Army veterans.

== See also ==
- Red triangle (badge)
- National Front of the German Democratic Republic
