= Maria Wachter =

Political activist against Nazism (1910–2010)

Maria Wachter (21 April 1910 – 18 August 2010) was a political activist (KPD) who resisted Nazism both before and after 1933. She spent most of the twelve Nazi years in exile or detained in camps and prisons. She was asked in 2010 if she was proud, on the occasion of her hundredth birthday, to be among the last survivors of those who had resisted the Nazis. Evidently she was not, but she was proud to have been a member of the Communist Party for nearly eighty years.

== Life ==
=== Family provenance ===
Maria Wachter was born in Düsseldorf. Her father had been a Social Democratic activist as a young man, described by his daughter as an "outspoken revolutionary", but in 1914 he was conscripted into the army. He survived the First World War, but with his political spirit broken. To his daughter's growing bewilderment as she grew up, and then to her enduring regret, his priority became to avoid losing his job with the city power supply company. Maria Wachter joined the Communist Party in 1930. By this time she had already trained for office work and become a member of "Dynamo", a workers' sports association which had been her route to the Communist Party.

A year later, in 1931, she joined the Agitprop theatre group "Nord-West-Ran" which had been established in Düsseldorf by Wolfgang Langhoff. A fellow member of the "Nord-West-Ran", until his arrest later that year, was Hilarius Gilges. On 26 January 1932, when Adolf Hitler, as leader of the opposition Nazi Party, came to present his programme to 300 Düsseldorf industry and bank chiefs at a meeting of the Düsseldorf Industrial Society, Wachter was one of the many demonstrators who gathered in front of the prestigious Parkhotel chanting "Wer Hitler wählt, wählt den Krieg" ("Voters for Hitler are voting for another war").

=== Régime change ===
1932 was a year of two general elections at the end of which, despite receiving only slightly more than a third of the votes cast, the Nazi Party emerged as the largest single party, which was sufficient to support a successful power grab at the start of 1933. After this the Nazis lost little time in creating a one party dictatorship. The Reichstag fire at the end of February 1933 was immediately blamed on "communists" whose political activities had become illegal. Wachter joined an "underground" resistance group in Düsseldorf. Within the group her value was increased by the fact that she was the only one of the comrades who knew how to type. In a later interview she insisted that there was no systematic gender bias within the group, but nevertheless pointed to examples of the ways in which having female members enhanced operational flexibility. In Düsseldorf the political left had always been strong, and the distribution of (illegal) Communist Party leaflets through people's letter boxes was best accomplished using a perambulator. Distribution was typically undertaken by teams of four, and while two comrades loitered at the ends of the street, the mixed gender couple actually delivered the material. If a uniformed official was spotted, one of the comrades would casually whistle while the two people making the deliveries would instantly engage in passionate embrace with one another.

Within the Düsseldorf resistance group, by 1935 she was working increasingly closely with Elli Schmidt ("Irene Gärtner") and Heinrich Wiatrek ("Fritz Weber"), both of whom had returned from Moscow, equipped with their party pseudonyms, the previous year. It was Wiatrek who proposed that Maria Wachter should also be sent to Moscow to undertake a course at the International Lenin School there: this would remove her from Germany at a time when it seemed arrest her by the Gestapo was looming closer every day. She set out for Moscow in May 1935, travelling via the Netherlands. In Amsterdam she was seized with self doubt, convinced that her fellow students would all be steeped in Marxist theory while she, having joined the Communist Party only in 1930, knew next to nothing about the relevant philosophical underpinnings. A helpful comrade was able to reassure her, however, lending her "The State and Revolution" by Lenin as well as "The Origin of the Family, Private Property and the State" by Engels, and patiently talked her through them. Her self-doubt was only partially expunged by this, but the solicitous Amsterdam comrade nevertheless calmed her nerves sufficiently to persuade her to proceed to Moscow where, as she later told an interviewer, her time at the International Lenin School would prove to be the most beautiful time in her life ("die schönste Zeit in meinem Leben").

The focus of her studies at the International Lenin School was on the History of the Labour Movement, German History and Political economy, all through the prism of Marxism. Early on students were assessed to determine whether they should study for eighteen months, or whether they would be able to complete the curriculum in nine months. Wachter was assigned to the nine-month cohort, which comprised 45 students. She was an enthusiastic scholar, especially of Political economy. Lessons were held partly in Russian and partly in German, but this was changed in the interests of efficiency: language classes were dropped and the other classes were later held entirely in German. During her time in Moscow she got to know several people who would later become members of the ruling elite in the German Democratic Republic, including Wilhelm Pieck and Herbert Wehner. It had been a condition of her participation that on completion of the course she should return home and resume her contribution to anti-fascist resistance, but in 1936 this proved to be impossible. She stayed in Moscow from May 1935 till the autumn of 1937.

By 1937 Germany's Communist leaders had either been arrested or had fled into exile. The exiled leadership were concentrated in Paris and Moscow. Smaller centres were opened in the other countries surrounding Germany. Wachter was allocated to Amsterdam, where she lived illegally as a "party instructor", using false identity papers. From her Amsterdam base she led resistance groups in the Bielefeld area, including one at the Dürkopp plant and another at the Oetker plant. She was particularly proud of the resistance group at Dürkopp, which grew to 60 (formerly SPD) members. Her party work involved frequent train journeys into Germany, crossing the frontier at Emmerich. This, armed with her false identity papers, was particularly stressful. However, she followed up on a comrade's advice, making sure she always had a piece of bread and butter with her. On reaching the frontier she would slowly unwrap it and begin to eat. When the door to the train compartment burst open and the frontier policeman, accompanied by an SS colleague, asked to see her passport, she was able to pass it to him casually, while concentrating on her simple meal, thus avoiding exchanging looks with the officials and at the same time calming her own nerves. It always worked.

=== War years ===
By 1939 Wachter was living in Paris. Within Europe France was unusual in welcoming political exiles from Nazi Germany and permitting them to live in the country legally without having to marry locally, but following a change of government in April 1938 French liberal traditions regarding political asylum were thrown into reverse, and by 1939, even in France foreign passport holders were required to renew their residence permits each week at the local prefecture. This meant that as the political wind continued to change the authorities already held an up to date and broadly accurate register of where the political exiles might be found. The German invasion of Poland began on 1 September 1939, followed a couple of weeks later by the Soviet invasion of Poland from the other side. France and the United Kingdom responded by declaring war on Germany on 3 September 1939, but without significant effect on the German-Soviet conquest of Poland. Domestically the Daladier government responded to international developments as best they might. On the night of 31 August 1939 Maria Wachter was one of several thousand German political exiles to be arrested in Paris, identified now as "enemy aliens", and taken to a central Paris police station. They were then transferred to the large internment camp at Rieucros which had been opened in the south of France at the start of 1939 intended, at that stage, to receive political refugees from the Spanish Civil War.

Nine months of uncertainty ended in May 1940 when German forces invaded France. Paris surrendered on 14 June. Now Northern France was directly occupied by Germany while in the south, which included Rieucros, a puppet government administered a quasi-autonomous "free zone". The agreement between "Vichy France" and the Germans provided that all persons required to be handed over to the Germans should be. Maria Wachter was evidently included on the list, and at the end of 1941 she was handed over to the Gestapo. During the three months from December 1941 till February 1942 she was accommodated in a succession of 13 (as she later recalled) prisons, ending up back in Düsseldorf where she underwent extensive interrogation by the Gestapo. The Gestapo were particularly concerned to know all about her two years in Moscow, and although she initially denied ever having been to Moscow, it became increasingly clear that her interrogators were already extremely well informed, from other sources, about her time there.

She faced a trial at Hamm and was sentenced to a term of imprisonment that would result in release in April 1945. After that she was to be transferred to the Ravensbrück concentration camp. As matters turned out, the Nazi regime was collapsing by April 1945 and the transfer to Ravensbrück never took place. Much of her sentence was served in the prison at Anrath, initially in solitary confinement. Later she was used for forced labour, including farm work which involved tasks such as harvesting potatoes, pulling up weeds and planting barley. There was no change to the work pattern when it rained. A forced labour assignment which she would remember more fondly involved several months during 1943 at the Kaiser Coffee works. Most of Nazi overseers having been called away to more pressing duties, the prisoners were overseen by the plant supervisors. Nora and Käthe, the supervisors for the machine to which Wachter was assigned, even provided her with newspapers which she could read hurriedly during toilet breaks, away from any Gestapo observers. Non prisoner co-workers also saw to it that while at the coffee works labourers from the prison were well fed. Additionally, after a year wearing the same (never washed) black dress with a yellow stripe, Wachter now had a change of clothes that even included a bra. (There were no bras for the prisoners at Anrath.) Towards the end of her sentence she was removed from the prison at Anrath and set to work at a munitions factory in Steinhagen where she took the opportunity to commit discrete acts of sabotage of the production equipment.

=== After the war ===
War ended, formally, in May 1945. Düsseldorf and the surrounding region now formed part of the British occupation zone, which in May 1949 would be merged with US and French occupation zones to be relaunched as the German Federal Republic (Bundesreuplik Deutschland / BRD / West Germany). Maria Wachter was released. She took a secretarial job in Düsseldorf and renewed her membership of the Communist Party. However, with the intensification of Cold War tensions that followed the 1953 uprising in East Germany and accompanied Soviet military intervention in Hungary in 1956, in August 1956 the West German Constitutional Court banned the Communist Party. Wachter was briefly taken into "investigative custody" in Neuss, but was not charged or convicted. The German Communist Party was relaunched in 1968 as a "new" party with a (slightly) new name, and from some of her utterances it appears that Wachter lost no time in (re)joining it.

Wachter was still aged only 35 when the war ended. She became known as a survivor of Nazi persecution. For many years she worked full-time in Frankfurt at the West German office of the Association of Persecutees of the Nazi Regime ("Vereinigung der Verfolgten des Naziregimes" / VVN) and its successor organisation, eventually becoming its honorary president for North Rhine-Westphalia. Even in old age she continued lecturing to school classes and events about her years opposing the Nazi régime.

She was a co-founder of the "warning-memorial" ("Mahn- und Gedenkstätte") opened in 1987 in Düsseldorf to commemorate Nazi victims. Wachter's continuing uncomplicated commitment to Communism meant that she remained controversial with much of the political mainstream, however. In September 2008 the Düsseldorf council rejected a move to make her an honorary citizen of the city. The proposition was supported only by councillors from Die Linke ("The Left" party). The Greens and one Social Democrat abstained in the vote the turned down the idea.
