= Margarete Jung =

German resistant against Nazism and East German politician

- Born: May 12, 1898
- Died: November 30, 1979 (aged 81); East Berlin
- Occupations: Communist resistant and politician
- Years active: 1918-1979
- Political party: Communist Party of Germany, Socialist Unity Party of Germany
- Awards: Patriotic Order of Merit in gold

Margarete Jung (12 May 1898 — 30 November 1979) was a German communist who was imprisoned in the Ravensbrück concentration camp during World War II and later held leadership positions in East Germany. Arrested in 1936 for distributing anti-Nazi literature, Jung was sentenced to five years imprisonment. In 1942, at the end of her sentence instead of being freed she was transferred to the Ravensbrück concentration camp, where she survived until the end of the war.

After the war, Jung lived in East Germany and held leadership positions in East German communist and women's organizations. She died in 1979 in East Berlin.

== Early life ==
Born in 1898, Jung joined the Spartacus League in 1918 and became a member of the Communist Party of Germany in 1919.

== Resistance to Nazism ==
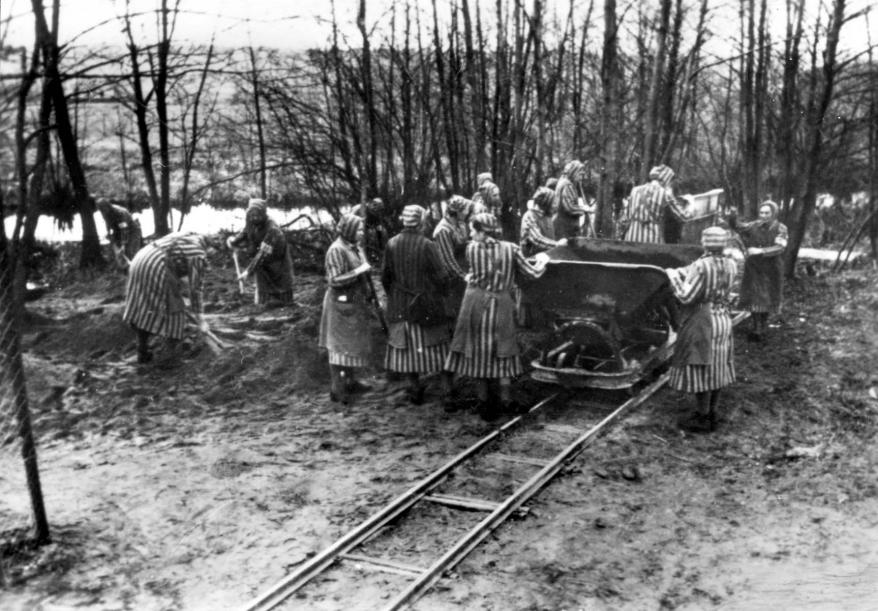
Women prisoners at Ravensbrück

After the Nazi Party seized power in 1933, the Communist Party was declared illegal and went underground. Many Communist Party members were arrested and imprisoned. Some were held only for a short period, supposedly to be re-educated, others were held longer. Margarete Jung and her husband continued to distribute anti-Fascist literature in this period. Jung was arrested in 1936 and in 1937 the People's Court sentenced her to five years imprisonment. Jung served her sentence in the jails of Jawor and Waldheim and should have been released in 1942, but was instead re-arrested and transferred to the Ravensbrück concentration camp where she survived until the end of the war.

== Life in East Germany ==
After the end of World War II, Jung lived in East Germany. In 1946 she joined the Socialist Unity Party of Germany, becoming a member of the district committee in Prenzlauer Berg and the district leadership in Berlin and working on the Main Committee of the Victims of Fascism from 1945 to 1947.

On 27 October 1951, Jung was appointed to the central executive committee of the Union of Persecutees of the Nazi Regime. After this organisation was replaced in East Germany in 1953 by the Committee of the Anti-fascist Resistance Fighters she was a representative to the new organisation.

Jung was also on the federal executive committee of the Democratic Women's League of Germany.

== Death ==
Jung died in 1979 in East Berlin.
