= Max Mannheimer =

Jewish author, painter and Holocaust survivor

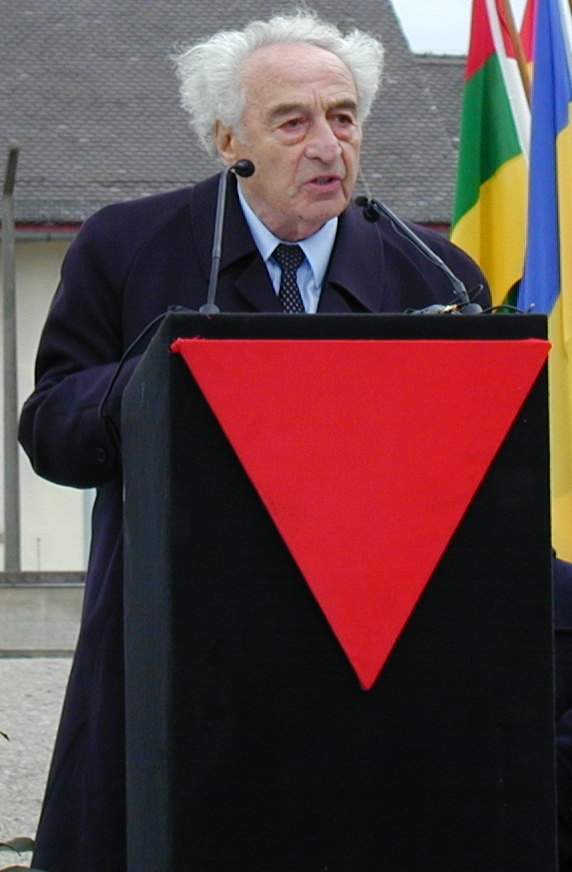
Mannheimer speaking about the liberation of Dachau on May 5, 2002

Max Mannheimer (6 February 1920 – 23 September 2016) was an author, painter and survivor of the Holocaust. Except for one brother, he lost his entire family in the Holocaust, including his new wife. For decades, he did not speak about his experiences, despite nightmares and depression. In 1986, while traveling in the United States, he happened to see a swastika and the sight of it triggered a nervous breakdown. After that, he began to speak about his experiences at the hand of the Nazis, giving talks to young people and adults, at school and universities. Mannheimer won many honors and awards for his work.

== Early life ==
Mannheimer was born in Neutitschein, North Moravia, in what was then Czechoslovakia and is today in the Czech Republic. His mother, Margarethe (Markéta), née Gelb, was born 4 April 1893 in Uherský Brod, near the Hungarian border. His father was Jakob Leib Mannheimer, born 24 May 1888 in Myślenice, Poland.

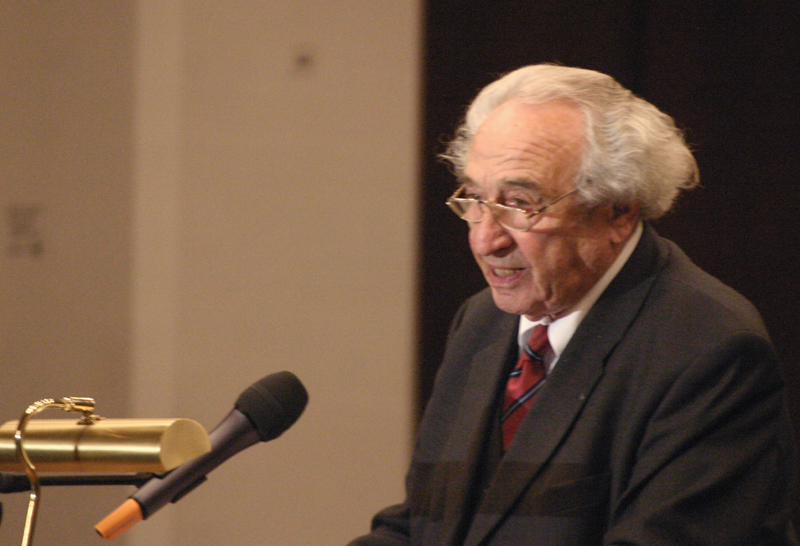
Mannheimer in 2005

== Nazi era ==
In October 1938, however, Nazi Germany annexed the Sudetenland, according to the Munich Agreement dated 29 September 1938. Weeks later, on the night of November 9th, Kristallnacht, his father was arrested and taken into "protective custody". At 18, Mannheimer would have been taken too, but his mother lied to the police about his age. His father was released after promising to leave Germany within eight days and, on 27 January 1939, the family moved to Ungarisch Brod, today known as Uherský Brod.

Within months, Nazi troops and military units were being seen in their new city and the square near their home was renamed after Adolf Hitler. Their freedoms were increasingly restricted by the laws against Jews, but Mannheimer nonetheless was married and began to make a life for himself.

In 1942, Mannheimer's brother, Erich, was deported to Auschwitz. In January 1943, Mannheimer, his mother, father, brothers Ernst (Arnošt) and Edgar, his 15-year-old sister, Katharina (called Käthe), and his 22-year-old wife, Eva (née Bock), were transported from Uherský Brod and after a brief stop at Theresienstadt, on 1 February 1943 (four days before Mannheimer's 23rd birthday) they all were deported to Auschwitz. Mannheimer lost most of his family upon arrival at Auschwitz. His parents, sister and wife were taken in the first selektion. Shortly thereafter, his brothers Erich and Ernst were taken. Mannheimer survived three selections — and an operation in the Auschwitz hospital by a doctor who was also a prisoner.

In October 1943, Mannheimer and his younger brother, Edgar, were sent to the Warsaw Ghetto to clear rubble. In July 1944, he was sent on a death march to Dachau, arriving on 6 August 1944. After three weeks in quarantine, he was sent to Allach, a Dachau subcamp where he worked at a BMW factory. At the beginning of 1945, he and his brother were sent to Mühldorf subcamp, which was evacuated by train on 28 April 1945. The train was liberated by American troops on 30 April 1945 in Seeshaupt. In the end, only Mannheimer and his brother Edgar survived.

== After liberation ==
After his release from a lazaret, and weighing a scant 75 pounds (34 kilograms), he swore he would never again set foot on German soil. However, shortly thereafter, he fell in love with a young German, Elfriede Eiselt, who had been in the German Resistance, whom he married, returning to Germany in 1946. His second wife died from cancer in 1964. Until his death, he was married to an American and lived near Munich. He had a daughter from his second marriage and a son from his third.

From 1947 to 1962, he worked at a Jewish welfare agency and a newspaper. He began painting under the name ben jakov (son of Jakob), in the 1950s. His first attempt to make paintings about the past was in 1954. His first show was in 1975 and numerous one-man shows in Germany and other countries followed. Paintings by "ben jakov" are untitled.

He became known through his lectures about his experiences in the concentration camps. For decades, he never spoke about his experiences, but had suffered nightmares and depression. On a trip to the United States in 1986, he happened to see a swastika and fell apart, suffering a nervous breakdown. Since the mid-1980s, he has been giving lectures to young people and adults in schools, universities and elsewhere as an eyewitness to the horrors of Third Reich and the Nazi era. He also gives groups of school children tours of Dachau. He says that the lectures are a form of therapy for him, that he'd like to forget the past because it has given him nightmares and caused him depression, but feels a duty to those who did not survive to never forget.

You aren’t responsible for what happened. But you are responsible that it won’t happen again.

— Max Mannheimer

Mannheimer was an honorary member of Gegen Vergessen – Für Demokratie ("Against Forgetting - For Democracy"), the chairman of which was Joachim Gauck. Mannheimer was also chairman of "Lagergemeinschaft Dachau" and vice president of Comité International de Dachau (International Dachau Committee).

== Later years ==
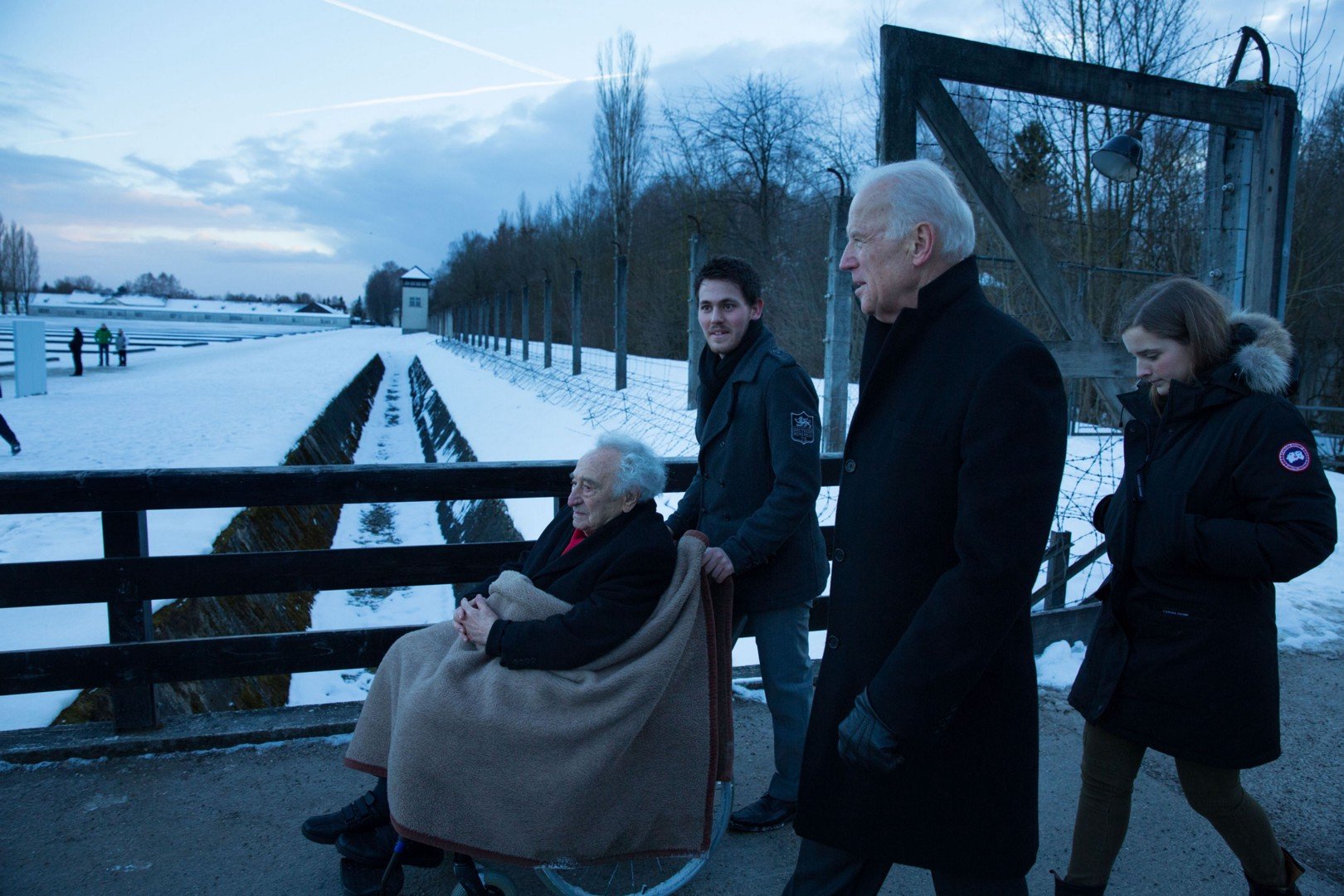
Mannheimer touring Dachau with Vice President Joe Biden in 2015

During campaigning for the 2013 German federal election, he invited Chancellor Angela Merkel to visit Dachau, making her the first chancellor to visit the former concentration camp. Though residents praised Merkel's move, it was also viewed as a potential electoral ploy. He died on 23 September 2016, aged 96.

== Honors and awards ==
Mannheimer was awarded the Waldemar von Knoeringen Prize from the Georg von Vollmar Academy. The prize is awarded every two years to outstanding individuals who advance the cause of labour and democratic socialism. Other awards and honors include:

- Knight of the French Legion of Honor (Chevalier de la Légion d'Honneur)
- Georg von Vollmar Medal
- Wilhelm Hoegner Prize
- Auschwitz Cross
- Honorary citizen, City of Neutitschein
- Upper Bavarian Cultural Prize, 2005
- Federal Cross of Merit
- Bavarian Order of Merit
- Bavarian Constitutional Medal, (silver)
- Honorary doctorate, LMU Munich, 2000
- Bavarian Constitutional Medal, (gold), 2009

== Books ==
- Spätes Tagebuch. Pendo Verlag, Zürich 2005, ISBN 3-86612-069-9 (in German)
- A Diary Delayed. (English translation by Kathryn Woodard). Oettingen Press, 2018.
