= Harry Naujoks =

German Lagerältester and chronicler of Sachsenhausen concentration camp (1901–1983)

Harry Naujoks (18 September 1901 – 20 October 1983) was a German anti-fascist and communist and survivor of Sachsenhausen concentration camp.

== Biography ==
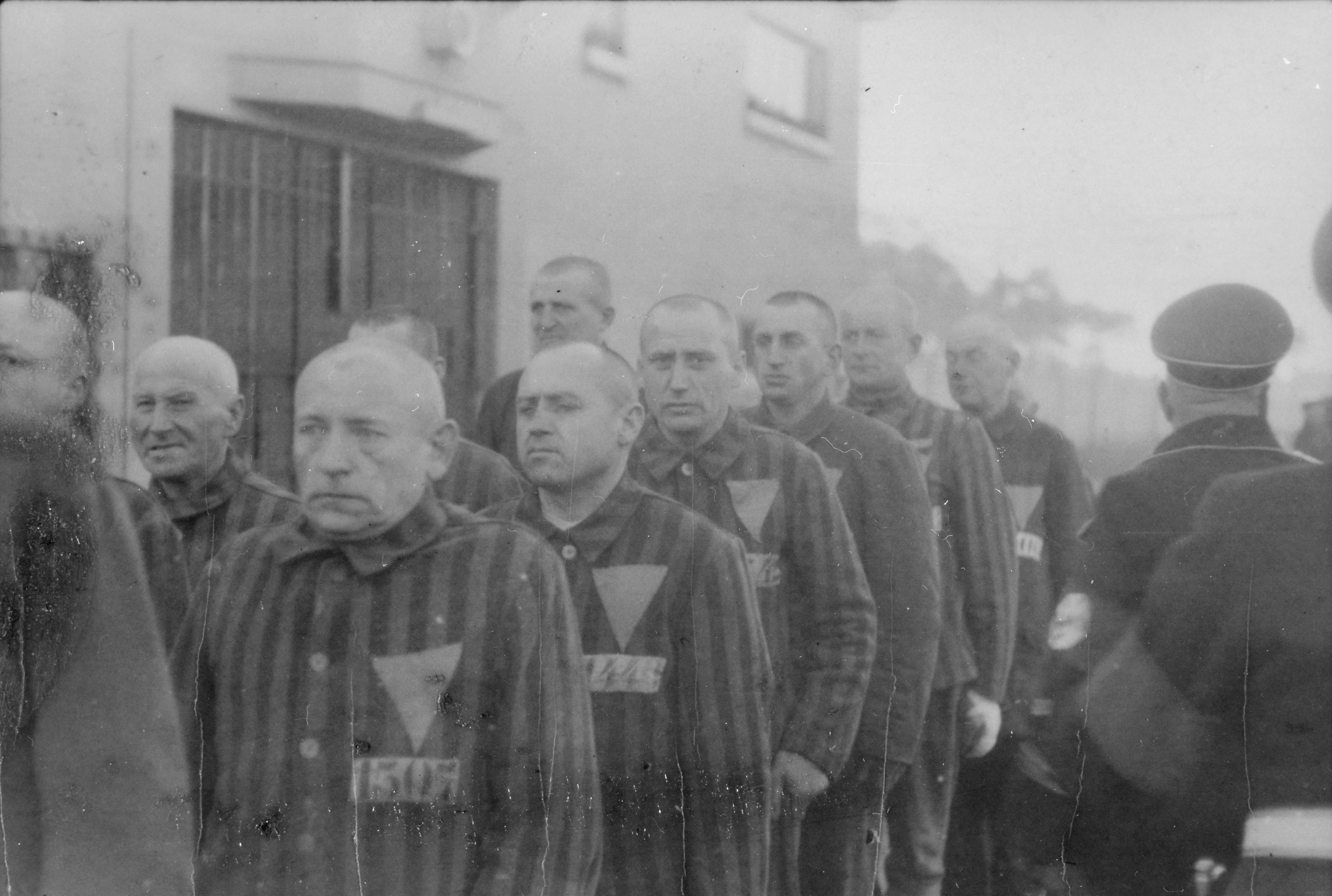
Prisoners of Sachsenhausen, 19 December 1938

Naujoks was born in Harburg on the Elbe (today part of Hamburg). He learned the trade of boilermaker in Hamburg and joined the Communist Party of Germany (KPD) in 1919. He and his wife Martha were married in 1926 and had one son, Rainer.

After the Nazis seized power in 1933, Naujoks was arrested. For over two years, he was sent to various prisons and concentration camps, including KoLaFu and by 1936, one of the Emslandlager, before finally being sent to Sachsenhausen. Beginning in November 1936, Naujoks worked as a prisoner in the camp administration and in 1939, was named Lagerältester (camp supervisor) "because of his unflappable calm and his organisational talent". In May 1942, he was ordered by Lagerführer Fritz Suhren to execute a fellow prisoner by hanging, but refused, a dangerous act of insubordination. He was able to survive the insubordination and to avoid executing the prisoner himself, but he was forced to stand next to the gallows during the hanging, which was made to be particularly slow and painful. In November 1942, he and 17 other prisoner functionaries in the clandestine camp resistance group were arrested, tortured and deported to Flossenbürg concentration camp for extermination. It was only through solidarity with the prisoners there that he survived maltreatment from the guards.

== After 1945 ==
After the war, Naujoks was the chairman of the Hamburg KPD and remained politically active after the KPD was banned in 1956. A particular focus of his political activity was his work as chairman of the West German Sachsenhausen Committee along with his work for the International Sachsenhausen Committee and the Union of Persecutees of the Nazi Regime.

He lived in Stübeheide in the Klein Borstel suburb of Hamburg till his death in 1983.

== Legacy ==
Martha and Harry Naujoks' library, containing 2,000 volumes, was donated to the Memorial and Museum Sachsenhausen, making it the most comprehensive individual donation. Among the documents are files from the Nuremberg Trials of Nazi doctors, judgments for treason from the Volksgerichtshof and files from the Nazi Party Chancellery.

On 16 April 1999 there was an exhibition called "Harry Naujoks (1901-1983) — Lagerältester und Chronist des KZ Sachsenhausen" at the Memorial and Museum Sachsenhausen. It opened with presentations by Dr. Winfried Meyer, Prof. Nozicka of Prague, Ursel Hochmuth and Naujoks' son, Rainer.

== Memoirs ==
Naujoks documented his memoirs and interviews with other former Sachsenhausen prisoners on a collection of taped recordings. He creates a vivid picture of camp life and the resistance work at Sachsenhausen. This recorded archive was transcribed into a book in 1987 by his wife, Martha and historian Ursel Hochmuth. Called My life in Sachsenhausen concentration camp, 1936-1942 (original title: Mein Leben im KZ Sachsenhausen 1936–1942), it was re-released with added material in the German Democratic Republic (GDR) in 1989. His recollections were valuable because his position gave him access and the length of his imprisonment gave him insights.

Naujoks chronicled both the indignities of daily life and the crimes of the Nazis at Sachsenhausen.

Every SS guard had to be greeted by the prisoners. When a prisoner walked by an SS guard, six paces beforehand, the prisoner had to place his left hand on the seam of his trousers and with his right hand, quickly doff his cap and lay it on the seam of his trousers on the right-hand side. The prisoner had to walk by the guard while looking at him, as at attention. Three paces afterward, he was allowed to put his cap back on. This had to be done with the thumb pressed against the palm, the four fingers resting on the cap, pressed against the seam of the trousers. If this didn't happen quickly enough or the prisoner didn't snap to attention enough or his fingers weren't taut enough, or anything else happened that struck the SS guard as being insufficient, then one's ear was boxed, he had extra sports, or was reported.
— written after 1945

Describing life at the barracks, he wrote,

When we came back to the barracks in the evening, tired after work, everything was all thrown together. The lockers were tipped over, preserves, margarine and any other food lay in a pile in the middle of the barrack with toothpaste, laundry, broken glass, etc. The iron bed frames were all knocked over, the straw sacks [the bedding] emptied out... When we were finally in bed, then the barracks supervisor would come in the middle of the night and it was get out of bed, get on the joists, under the beds — for as long as the barracks supervisor wanted... Many never even went to bed at night, but slept on the floor so they wouldn't have to reconstruct a bed. To avoid being seen by the barracks supervisor, they would crawl under the beds.
— written after 1945

Sachsenhausen was built with 67 barracks designed to hold 100 to 120 people, but ultimately held 600. The population expanded dramatically in mid-1938, after the Nazis carried out their "Aktion Arbeitscheu Reich", arresting 10,000 "azociale" (undesirables) as being "work averse" and the "June Initiative", the first mass arrests of Jews. After these massive arrests, thousands of people were deported to concentration camps. Sachsenhausen's population went from 2,920 in May 1938 to over 9,200 in June 1938. Naujoks recalled the overcrowding.

In normal occupancy, each barrack had 146 prisoners. This was true until mid-1938. After that, a third bed was added. Then the barrack occupancy was 180-200 men... In essence, this was case only in the first ring after 1938-1939... In other barracks, the overcrowding of the camp led to the beds being removed and the straw sacks were laid on the ground. There were also times where day rooms were covered with straw sacks at night; during the day, the straw sacks were stacked in the other room with the beds. In the large barracks, dubbed "mass barracks", often 400 prisoners were jammed together.

From July to September 1942, almost all of the pink triangle prisoners then at Sachsenhausen fell victim to a targeted SS extermination initiative. After liberation, Naujoks reported the murder of 200 individuals in this initiative.

== Selected works ==
- Nahrung für das Notstandsgebiet Hamburg, KPD, Hamburg (1947) (in German)
- Das Gestern soll nicht das Heute bestimmen, Sachsenhausen booklet, No. 3. Dortmund (1962) (in German)
- Mein Leben im KZ Sachsenhausen 1936–1942. Erinnerungen des ehemaligen Lagerältesten. Edited by Ursel Hochmuth. Published by Martha Naujoks and the Sachsenhausen Committee for the Bundesrepublik Deutschland, Röderberg-Verlag, Cologne (1987). Also published by Dietz Verlag, Berlin (1989) and Pahl-Rugenstein, Cologne (1989), ISBN 3-89144-321-8 (in German)
