= Peter Gingold =

German politician

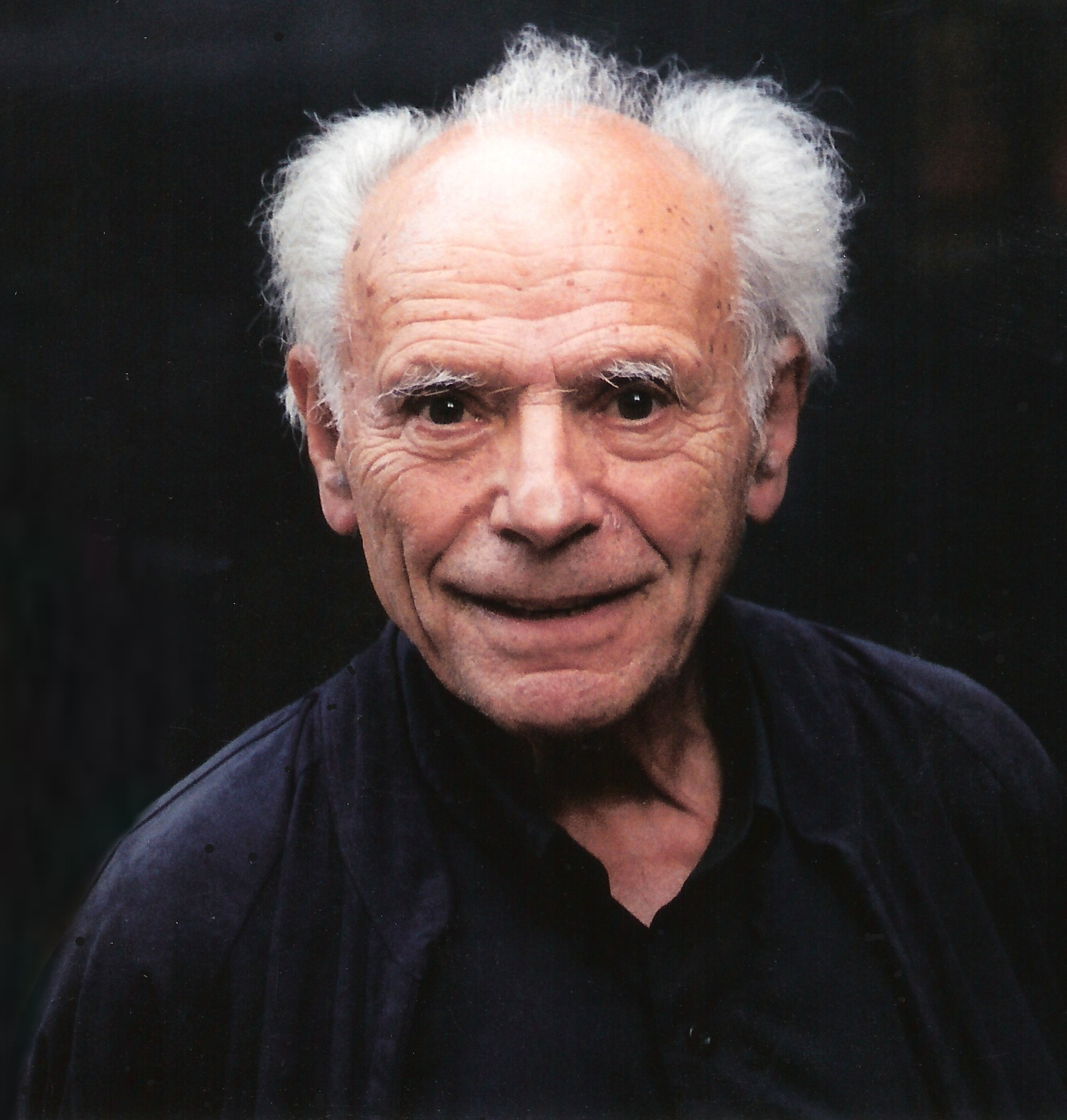
Peter Gingold

Peter Gingold (8 March 1916 – 29 October 2006) was a figure in the German Resistance and the National Committee for a Free Germany. He was born in a Jewish family in Aschaffenburg, Bavaria. He was a member of the Communist Party of Germany (KPD) and its successor the German Communist Party (DKP). He also won the Carl von Ossietzky Medal.

== Biographical details ==
Gingold was born Aschaffenburg, Lower Franconia. He fled Germany and went to Paris, where he became active in the German exile movement. After the occupation of Paris, Gingold had to flee again, this time heading to Dijon, where he became active in the Résistance. He was arrested by the Gestapo in 1943, but managed to escape. In August 1944, he took part in the uprising to liberate Paris. After that, he went to Lorraine, to help liberate that city.

He returned to Frankfurt am Main in August 1945 and resumed his activities with the Communist Party. Though he was honored in both France and Italy for his anti-fascist work, in Germany, he was vilified in his own country because of his political affiliation. He even had to fight to have his German citizenship recognized.

He was politically active in the Union of Persecutees of the Nazi Regime, the Association of Germans in the Résistance and the International Auschwitz Committee. He was also active in protests against IG Farben, related to their use of slave labor during the Nazi era.

Gingold died in Frankfurt in 2006 and is buried in Paris.
