= Heinrich Fink =

German theologian, university professor, and politician (1935–2020)

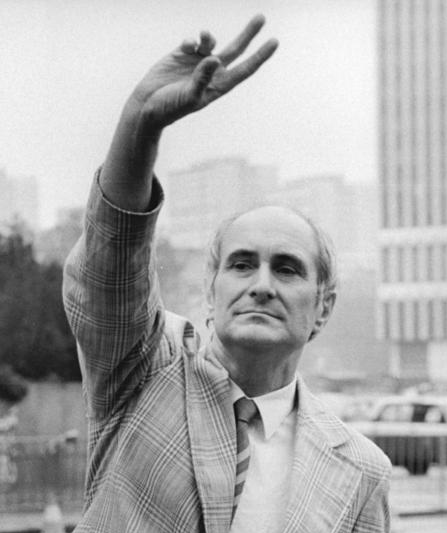
- Heinrich Fink at the vigil before the Berliner Dom, 6 August 1990
- Born: 31 March 1935; Korntal, Kingdom of Romania
- Died: 1 July 2020 (aged 85); Berlin, Germany
- Education: Humboldt University of Berlin (M.A., Ph.D.)
- Scientific career
- Fields: Theology
- Workplaces: Humboldt University of Berlin

Heinrich Fink (31 March 1935 – 1 July 2020) was a German theologian, university professor and politician (Die Linke). In 1991 Fink was dismissed from Humboldt University of Berlin due to allegations against him being a former informer for the East German state security office, the Stasi. Fink denied the allegations.

== Biography ==
Fink was born in Korntal, Bessarabia, Romania (today Cantemir, part of Nădejdea commune, in Sarata Raion) and came from an impoverished Bessarabian German peasant family. The family was resettled to Poland on the basis of Heinrich Himmler's emigration policy. Heinrich Fink joined the Free German Youth (FDJ). From 1954 to 1960, he studied Protestant theology at Berlin's Humboldt University, where he set out his doctoral thesis on Karl Barth and his master dissertation on Friedrich Schleiermacher.

From 1979 to 1992, Fink was Professor of Practical Theology at Humboldt University, of which he was the principal from 1990 to 1992. He was a member of the Christian Peace Conference wherein he occasionally was East German Regional Committee Chairman, and he was Chairman of the Union of Persecutees of the Nazi Regime (Vereinigung der Verfolgten des Naziregimes – Bund der Antifaschistinnen und Antifaschisten). From 1998 to 2001, Fink was a member of the German Bundestag for the Party of Democratic Socialism.

In November 1991 allegations about his cooperation with the East German state security were leaked to the public. Many academics and artists protested and spoke about a politically motivated procedure. Nevertheless, Fink was summarily fired. The decision to fire him was later upheld in German courts after he had sued Humboldt University and the administration of the city of Berlin, his former employer.

== Selected publications ==
=== Books ===
- (2013) Wie die Humboldt-Universität gewendet wurde. Erinnerungen des ersten frei gewählten Rektors. Hannover, Ossietzky.
- (2011) Einspruch! : antifaschistische Positionen zur Geschichtspolitik, with Cornelia Kerth and VVN-Bund der Antifaschisten VVN-BdA. Köln, PapyRossa.
- (1992) Heinrich Fink : sich der Verantwortung stellen, with Bernhard Maleck. Berlin, Dietz.
- (1992) Politische Kultur im vereinigten Deutschland : der Streit um Heinrich Fink, Rektor der Humboldt-Universität zu Berlin. Berlin, Utopie kreativ.
- (1991) Universität Leipzig Arbeitskreis Hochschulpolitische Öffentlichkeit. Heinrich Fink und der Umgang mit unserer Vergangenheit "eine ordinäre politische Massnahme", with Rudolf Bahro. Leipzig Arbeitskreis Hochschulpolitische Öffentlichkeit, 1991.
- (1987) Dietrich Bonhoeffer--gefährdetes Erbe in bedrohter Welt : Beiträge zur Auseinandersetzung um sein Werk, with Carl-Jürgen Kaltenborn and Dieter Kraft. Berlin, Union Verlag, 1987.
- (1985) Zur Geschichte der Theologischen Fakultät Berlins, with Heinrich Fink et al. Berlin, Humboldt-Universität.
- (1978) Karl Barth und die Bewegung Freies Deutschland in der Schweiz. [S.l.], 1978. [Doctoral Dissertation.] Karl Barth und die Bewegung Freies Deutschland in der Schweiz : Dissertation zur Erlangung des akademischen Grades doctor scientiae theologiae (Dr.sc.theol.), vorgelegt dem Senat des Wissenschaftlichen Rates der Humboldt-Universität zu Berlin. Berlin, H. Fink [Selfpublisher], 1978.
- (1969) Von Schleiermacher zu Marx, with Emil Fuchs and Herbert Trebs. Berlin, Union Verlag, 1969.
- [(1968)] Stärker als die Angst; den 6 Millionen, die keinen Retter fanden. Berlin, Union Verlag.
- 1966 Begründung der Funktion der Praktischen Theologie bei Friedrich Daniel Ernst Schleiermacher Eine Unters. anhand s. prakt.-theol. Vorlesgn. Berlin, [s.n.], 1966. (Berlin, Humboldt-U., Theol. F., Diss. v. 25. Jan. 1966.) [Master Dissertation.]
- [(1951)] Première Session du Conseil mondial de la paix. Berlin, with Palamede Borsari and Jessie Street. 21-26 février 1951. Compte rendu et documents II. N.l., n.d.
