= Adolphe Low =

German-French politician

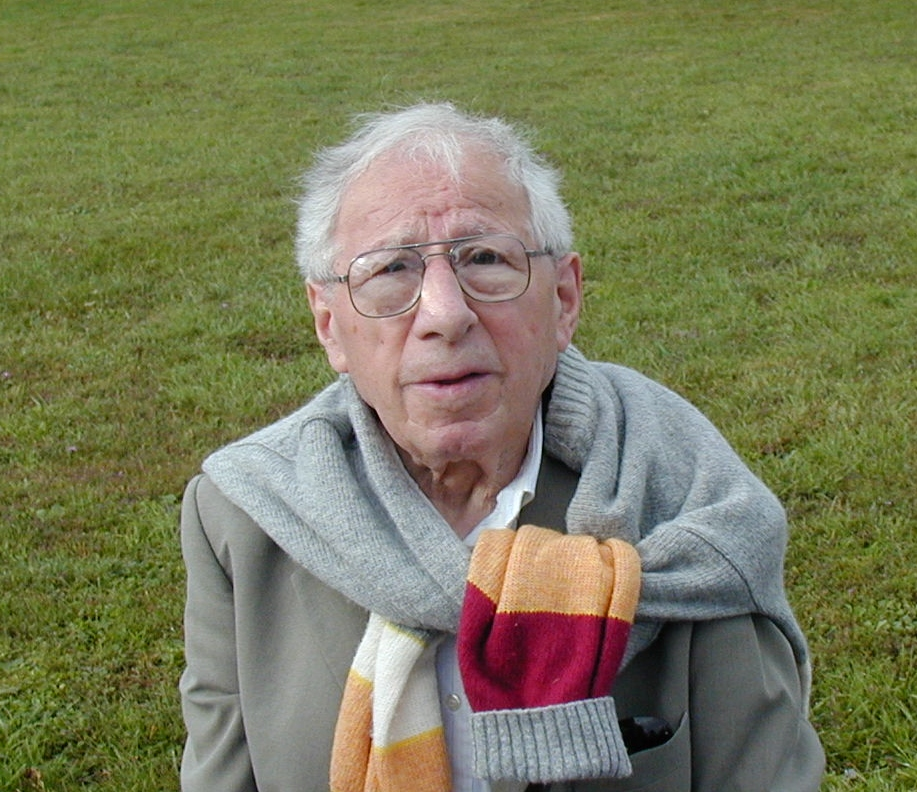

Adolphe Low (21 July 1915, at Cottbus – 11 November 2012, at Strasbourg) was a German-French politician.

Low was a member of the International Brigades that fought in the Spanish Civil War and a combatant with the French resistance movement Résistance.

== Literature ==
- Adolphe Low: Mein Weg nach Spanien. In: „informationen“ Studienkreis Deutscher Widerstand 1933–1945 e. V., Heft 49, Mai 1999.
