= International Ravensbrück Committee =

Association of former prisoners of the Ravensbrück concentration camp

The International Ravensbrück Committee (IRC) is an association of former prisoners of the Ravensbrück concentration camp, the largest concentration camp for women in the German Altreich during the Nazi period.

In 2018 the IRC has members from these countries: Austria, Belarus, Belgium, Czech Republic, Denmark, France, Germany, Hungary, Italy, Luxembourg, Netherlands, Norway, Poland, Romania, Russia, Slovakia, Slovenia, Spain and Ukraine. Not all national communities have nominated new members to replace deceased representatives.

== Organization ==
The IRC has an elected President and is registered as an association in Paris.

At the last meeting in May 2019, the new board of directors was elected and, by statute, will remain in office for four years.

The Italian Ambra Laurenzi is President

The Vice-Presidents is Hanna Nowakowska of Poland, Jeanine Bochat of Germany is Secraitary General and her deputy Czech Šárka Kadlecová. Marie-France Cabeza-Mernet, from France, is the Treasurer with Françoise Marchelidon her deputy. Margarita Català from Spain is auditor. The surviving members of the committee, Stella Nikiforwa, Yevgeniya Boyko, Barbara Piorowska, are assigned the position of honorary president.

== History ==
After years of bilateral and multilateral cooperation, IRC was founded in East Berlin (GDR) in April 1965. Eleven countries were founding members.

The first president served from 1965 to 1979 was the Frenchwoman Renée Mirande-Laval, who had previously led coordinating preparatory work, in particular for the creation of the first museum in Ravensbrück. From 1979 until her death in 1998, Rose Guerin served as president. Annette Chalut held the office from 1999 to 2015. From 2015 to June 2018, Eva Bäckerová from Slovakia was President. In June 2018, the first representative of the generation of relatives, the Italian Ambra Laurenzi, became President.

In later years, only a few direct survivors of the concentration camp were members, usually former child prisoners. Women of the generation born after the war whose relatives were imprisoned in the women's concentration camp, or women who are otherwise closely associated with the women of Ravensbrück, support the IRC. Where no national associations exist, individual representatives of a country have taken on commemorative work.

The national associations are independent. Membership in national associations is governed by the respective national statutes.

== Mission ==
Ideological, religious and other attitudes and actions, as well as descent, are irrelevant for membership in the national associations and the IRC, as long as they correspond to the goals listed below. These are:

- to secure the historical remnants and the memory of the former women's concentration camp Ravensbrück and its branches,
- to preserve the memories of the prisoners detained and who perished there,
- to safeguard the moral and material rights of survivors and families of the dead, and to promote good relations between them,
- to inform future generations and to help preserve peace.

The International Ravensbrück Committee holds annual meetings in various European countries where the memory of the deportation and the victims of the Nazi regime is preserved.

The International Ravensbrück Committee is one of the signatories of the legacy of the International Concentration Camp Communities, which was presented to Norbert Lammert, President of the Bundestag of the Federal Republic of Germany, in January 2009.

== Sources ==
- Internationales Ravensbrück-Komitee: Frauen-Konzentrationslager Ravensbrück 1945–2005. Internationales Ravensbrück-Komitee, 2005 (limited preview on Google Books)
- Helga Amesberger: Lebendiges Gedächtnis – die Geschichte der Österreichischen Lagergemeinschaft Ravensbrück Mandelbaum-Verlag, 2008, ISBN 978-3-854-76254-6 (limited preview on Google Books).
- Revivre et construire demain Relié – 1994, de Amicale des anciennes déportées de Ravensbrück (Auteur), ISBN 2-9509066-0-5
