= International Auschwitz Committee =

Formed by survivors of the Auschwitz death camp

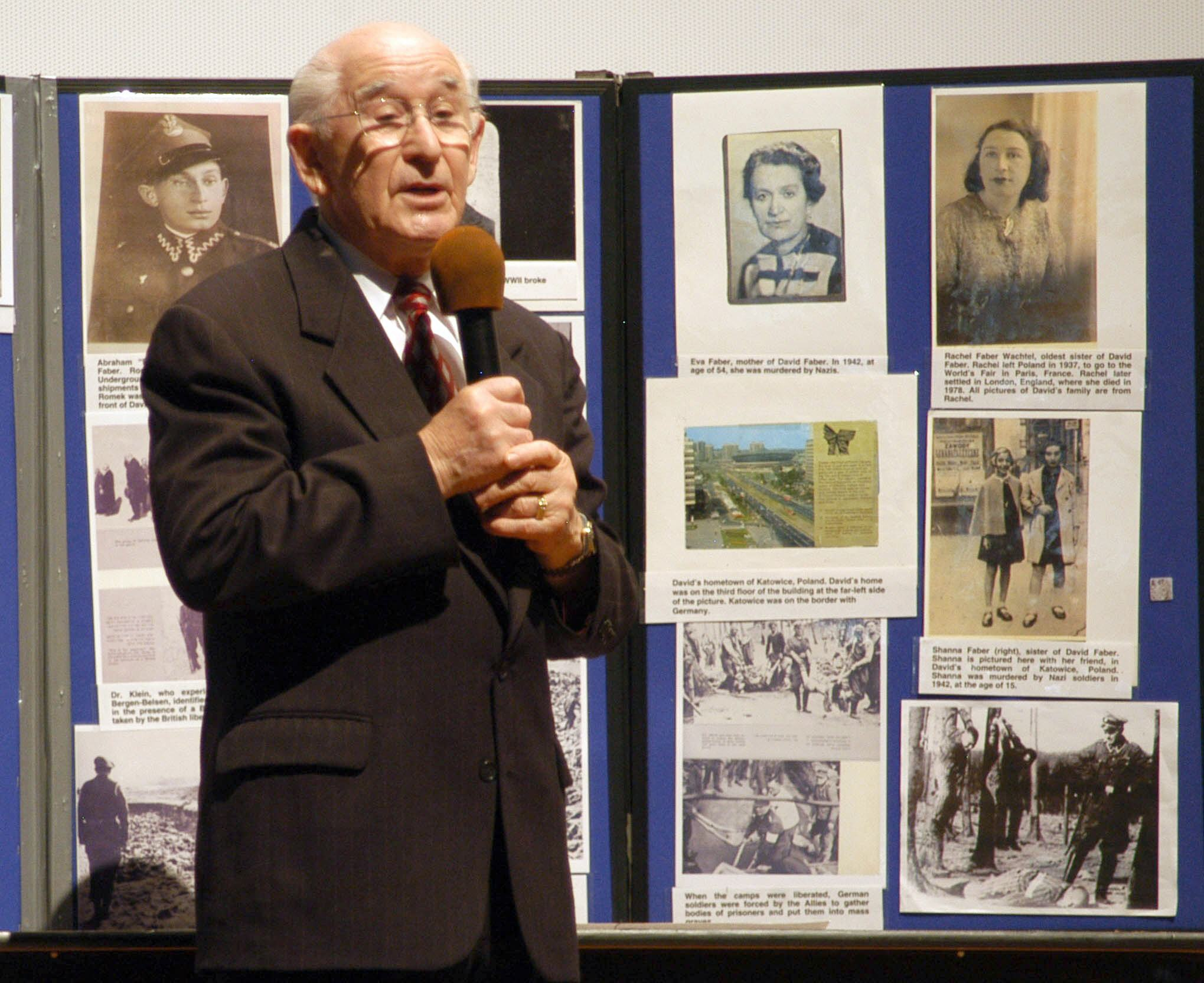
Holocaust survivor David Faber speaks to Sailors on board Naval Base Coronado (May 3, 2006)

The International Auschwitz Committee was formed by survivors of the Auschwitz death camp in 1952 for the support of the survivors and to fight racism and antisemitism. The committee's mission was to maintain contact with survivors on both sides of the Iron Curtain, and serve as an outreach program to young adults in the community. Its secretary is now based in Berlin (German: Koordinationsbüro des IAK).

== People ==
- Former chairman and honorary chairman was Kurt Goldstein (1914–2007).
- Tadeusz Hołuj (1916–1985), former secretary general
- Roman Kent (1929–2021), former president
- Felix Kolmer (1922–2022), former executive vice-president
- Marian Turski (1926–2025), president since 2021

== See also ==
- International concentration camp committees
