= Dorothée Menzner =

German politician

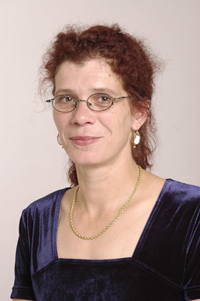
Image of Dorothee Menzner

Dorothée Luise Menzner née Katz (born 14 September 1965 in Darmstadt) is a German politician (Bündnis 90/Die Grünen, until 2021 Die Linke/PDS). She was state chairwoman of the Party of Democratic Socialism in Lower Saxony from 1998 to 2006 and a member of the German Bundestag for her party from 2005 to 2013.

== Life and career ==
After graduating from high school in 1985, Menzner first completed a voluntary social year in a home for the mentally and multiply disabled and began studying economics at the University of Hanover in 1986. After her intermediate diploma, she changed her subject and began studying architecture, which she completed in 1996 with a degree in engineering.

From 1999 to 2002, Menzner worked for the PDS Bundestag and was initially unemployed after leaving the Bundestag. From 2003 to 2005, she was self-employed. From 2005 to 2013, Menzner was a Member of the German Bundestag. Since 2012, she has worked as a freelance publicist and film producer. In 2012, she produced the film Hibakusha - Journey to the Island of Happiness about Japan one year after the Fukushima disaster.

After her Bundestag mandate, Menzner became self-employed as a legal counselor. From 2015 to 2018, she studied part-time again and graduated with a bachelor's degree in "Care and Guardianship" in November 2018.

Menzner is widowed and has one son.

== Politics ==
In her youth, Menzner was primarily involved in church youth and disability work. In 1994 she became a member of the PDS.

From 1995 to 1998 she was a member of the PDS district executive committee in Hanover and also of the federal party council from 1995 to 1996. From 1997 to 2000, 2002 to 2003 and from 2004 to 2006, she was a member of the federal executive of the PDS. From 2003 to 2005, she was also a member of the Geraer Dialog spokespersons' council.

Menzner was state chairwoman of the PDS in Lower Saxony from 1998 to 2006 and continued to be a member of the state executive committee as an assessor from 2006 to 2010.

From 2005 to 2013, Menzner was a member of the German Bundestag. In the 16th legislative period, she was transport policy Spokesperson for the Left Party parliamentary group, in the 17th legislative period energy policy Spokesperson for the DIE LINKE parliamentary group. She was elected to the Bundestag via the state list Lower Saxony.

Menzner justified her resignation from the party in 2021 by stating that the former party chairman Klaus Ernst had been elected chairman of the Bundestag Committee for Climate Protection and Energy. She has been a member of Bündnis 90/Die Grünen since spring 2023. In November 2023, she told nd that she could imagine rejoining Die Linke.

As of 2008, she is a member of the Association of Persecutees of the Nazi Regime - League of Anti-Fascists (VVN-BdA) and delegate to the Federal Congress.
