= Kurt Julius Goldstein =

German journalist (1914–2007)

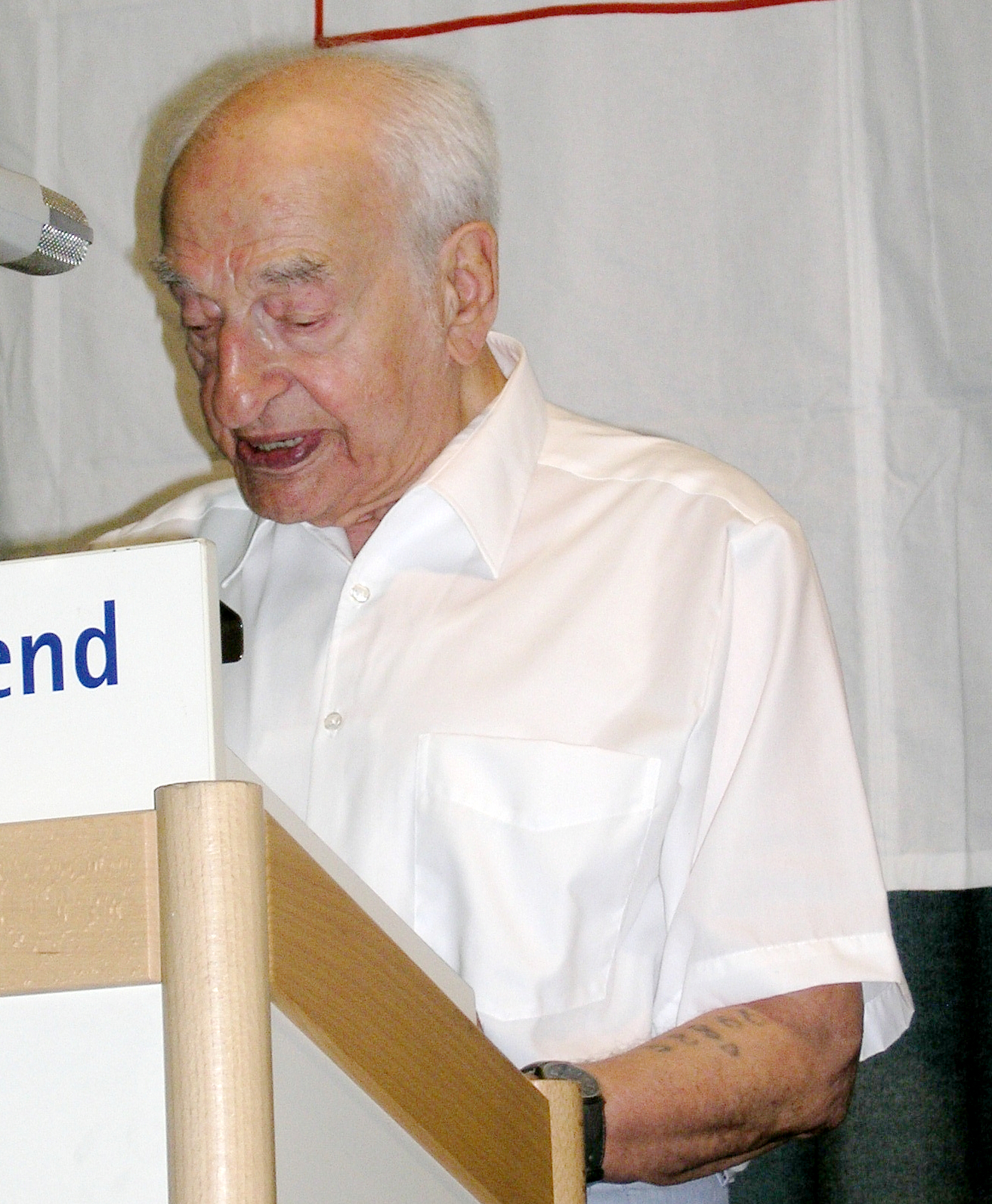
- Born: 3 November 1914; Dortmund, Germany
- Died: 24 September 2007 (aged 92); Berlin, Germany
- Occupations: Journalist, radio broadcaster and author.
- Known for: Holocaust survivor

Kurt Julius Goldstein (3 November 1914 – 24 September 2007) was a German journalist and a former broadcast director.

== Biography ==
Goldstein was born to a Jewish merchant family in Dortmund, Germany. At school, he experienced Germany's growing anti-Semitism and it had the effect of politicising him. In 1928, he joined the Young Communist League and two years later, the Communist Party of Germany, then headed by Ernst Thälmann. When the Nazis took power in 1933, Goldstein fled. He first lived in Luxembourg, working as a gardener, then moved to France. In 1935, he went to Palestine.

A year later, the Spanish Civil War erupted and many German Communists volunteered to fight. Goldstein soon joined them. When the Second Spanish Republic collapsed in early 1939, Goldstein escaped across the border into France. As return to Germany was impossible, he was interned and held in Camp Vernet.

Once France fell, his situation became perilous but it was three years before he was detected by the Vichy French authorities and deported to Germany. On arrival, he was sent to Auschwitz concentration camp, where he worked in the coal pits for 30 months. Along with Nobel Peace Prize winner Elie Wiesel (described in his book Night), Goldstein survived the death march from Auschwitz to Buchenwald. When Buchenwald was partly evacuated by the Nazis on 8 April 1945, Communist inmates stormed the watchtowers, killed the remaining guards and took control. The camp was formally liberated by American troops on 11 April 1945. Goldstein returned to East Germany after the war, working as a journalist, radio broadcaster and author.

In 2001, Mr. Goldstein along with Peter Gingold, another Holocaust survivor, began a class action lawsuit in America suing the US government and the Bush family for a total of $40bn in compensation claim that both materially benefited from Auschwitz slave labor during the Second World War. The case was thrown out by Judge Rosemary Collyer on the grounds that the government cannot be held liable under the principle of state sovereignty.

He was chairman (later an honorary chairman) of the Jerusalem-based International Auschwitz Committee for many years. He died in Berlin.
