= List of members of the second Volkskammer =

Overview of all Volkskammer members

This list provides an overview of all members of the Volkskammer of the German Democratic Republic (East Germany) during the 2nd legislative period (1954–1958).

== Composition ==
In the Volkskammer election of October 17, 1954, according to official figures, 99.46% of the voters supported the proposal put forth by the National Front.

Faction	Seats of East German Deputies	Seats of Deputies from Greater Berlin	Total Seats	According to Party Affiliation
SED	100	17	117	
DBD	45	7	52	
CDU	45	7	52	
LDPD	45	7	52	
NDPD	45	7	52	
FDGB	45	8	53	-
DFD	25	4	29	-
FDJ	25	4	29	-
Kulturbund	15	3	18	-
VdgB	10	2	12	-
Independent				
Total	400	66	466	

The election did not influence the strength of the factions. Their size was predetermined. The right column of the above table reflects the party affiliations of the members of the FDGB, DFD, FDJ, VdgB, and Kulturbund factions.

== Presidium ==
- President of the Volkskammer
  Johannes Dieckmann (LDPD)
- 1st Deputy President of the Volkskammer
  Hermann Matern (SED)
- Deputy President of the Volkskammer
  Friedrich Ebert (SED)
  Gerald Götting (CDU)
  Wilhelmine Schirmer-Pröscher (DFD)
  Grete Groh-Kummerlöw (FDGB)

== Faction Leaders ==
- SED Faction
  Hermann Matern
- DBD Faction
  Berthold Rose
- CDU Faction
  Max Sefrin
- LDPD Faction
  Rudolf Agsten
- NDPD Faction
  Heinrich Homann
- FDGB Faction
  Rudolf Kirchner
- DFD Faction
  Wally Keller
- FDJ Faction
  Edith Brandt
  Hans Modrow elected on September 24, 1958
- Kulturbund Faction
  Erich Wendt
- VdgB Faction
  Friedrich Wehmer

== Deputies ==
Name	Faction	Notes
Kurt Abendroth	DBD	
Wilhelm Adam	NDPD	
Rudolf Agricola	SED	
Rudolf Agsten	LDPD	
Heinrich Allmeroth	FDGB	
Kurt Anclam	LDPD	
Georg André		
Linda Arndt	SED	Mandatsniederlegung im März 1955, Bekanntgabe am 20. Mai 1955
Heinz Arnold	Genossenschaften	Mitglied der SED
Dora Arway	DFD	
Hermann Axen	SED	Berliner Vertreter
August Bach	CDU	bis 1955 Fraktionsvorsitzender
Harry Bachmann	SED	am 12. März 1958 für den Abg. Schirdewan nachgerückt
Arno Bähr	LDPD	
Fritz Barth	SED	
Karl-Heinrich Barthel	NDPD	am 18. Januar 1956 nachgerückt
Kurt Barthel	Kulturbund	Mitglied der SED
Johann Bartl	SED	
Alfred Bartsch	SED	
Bruno Baum	SED	Berliner Vertreter am 17. Mai 1957 für den Abg. Blender nachgerückt
Edith Baumann	SED	Berliner Vertreterin
Johannes R. Becher	Kulturbund	Mitglied der SED
Otto Benecke	VdgB	
Hilde Benjamin	SED	
Gerhard Bensch	LDPD	
Hans Bertram	LDPD	Berliner Vertreter
Dietrich Besler	DBD	
Hans Beyer	NDPD	
Fritz Beyling	SED	Berliner Vertreter
Helmut Biedermann	LDPD	
Jost Biedermann	CDU	Berliner Vertreter
Walter Biering	SED	
Gerhard Bläsing	SED	
Rudolf Blankenburger	Genossenschaften	Mitglied der SED
Rudolf Blau	SED	
Johannes Blender	SED	am 4. Februar 1957 verstorben
Walter Böttger	FDGB	
Waldemar Bogenschneider	FDJ	
Lothar Bolz	NDPD	
Willy Bosold	FDGB	Berliner Vertreter am 29. August 1956 für den Abg. Schlimme nachgerückt
Brunhilde Brandt	FDJ	
Edith Brandt	FDJ	
Marie Brandt	DBD	
Walter Breitfeld	SED	Berliner Vertreter
Arno Brömme	SED	
Edmund Brudzinski	FDJ	
Theodor Brugsch	Kulturbund	Berliner Vertreter
Heinrich Bruhn	FDGB	Mitglied der SED
Otto Buchwitz	SED	Alterspräsident
Friedrich Burmeister	CDU	
Justus Claus	LDPD	
Horst Claußner	FDJ	
Erich Correns	Kulturbund	
Franz Cott	DBD	
Elfriede Dallmann	NDPD	Berliner Vertreterin
Siegfried Dallmann	NDPD	
Ewald Damaske	CDU	
Hans-Joachim Dattelbaum	FDJ	Berliner Vertreter
Magnus Dedek	CDU	am 9. Juli 1955 verstorben
Heinrich Deiters	Kulturbund	Berliner Vertreter; Mitglied der SED
Gerd Delenschke	NDPD	Berliner Vertreter
Kurt Deudloff	SED	am 8. Februar 1956 verstorben
Johannes Dieckmann	LDPD	Präsident der Volkskammer
Hildegund Diez	NDPD	Berliner Vertreterin am 29. August 1956 für den Abg. Koltzenburg nachgerückt
Marta Dittmar	SED	
Erich Dittrich	FDGB	
Ernst Döcke	CDU	
Rudolf Dölling	SED	
Otto Dohne	SED	Berliner Vertreter
Hermann Dropmann	CDU	Berliner Vertreter am 29. August 1956 für den Abg. K. Hoffmann nachgerückt am 29. November 1957 verstorben
Albert Dürr	SED	
Margarethe Dyck	LDPD	am 23. Juli 1956 verstorben
Klaus-Jürgen Ebelt	LDPD	
Frieda Ebert	SED	
Friedrich Ebert	SED	Stellvertreter des Präsidenten der Volkskammer
Charlotte Eichler	FDGB	Berliner Vertreterin
Manfred Einenkel	LDPD	
Franz Eiselt	CDU	
Ilse Endter	FDJ	
Kurt Engel	FDGB	
Gerhilde Engelhardt	LDPD	Berliner Vertreterin
Luise Ermisch	SED	
Arno Ettrich	SED	am 16. November 1956 für den Abg. Ringel nachgerückt
Theodor Eversmann	CDU	am 2. November 1956 für die Abg. Olbrich nachgerückt
Ruth Fabisch	LDPD	
Martha Faust	FDGB	
Wilhelm Feldmann	NDPD	
Werner Felfe	FDJ	Mitglied der SED
Frank Fienold	FDGB	
Karl Fischer	CDU	
Manfred Flegel	NDPD	
Fritz Flint	CDU	Berliner Vertreter am 2. Juli 1958 für Helmut Dropmann von der Berliner Stadtverordnetenversammlung gewählt
Peter Florin	SED	
Hans Heinrich Franck	Kulturbund	Mitglied der SED
Alfred Franke	LDPD	
Hugo Franke	FDGB	
Reinhold Franz	DBD	
Ursula Friedrich	CDU	
Edeltrud Fritzsche	DFD	am 29. August 1956 für die Abg. Witt nachgerückt am 16. Juli 1958 verstorben
Paul Fröhlich	SED	
Gisela Fuchs	NDPD	
Wilhelm Funder	NDPD	
Heinz Funke	SED	
Hans-Paul Ganter-Gilmans	CDU	am 20. Januar 1955 verstorben
Rolf Gasch	FDGB	
Rosemarie Gebbert	FDJ	
Richard Gebel	NDPD	
Paul Geisler	FDGB	Mitglied der SED
Jacob Gerlach	FDGB	
Manfred Gerlach	LDPD	
Ottomar Geschke	SED	am 17. Mai 1957 verstorben
Hedwig Geyer	FDGB	am 2. November 1956 für die Abg. Lehmann nachgerückt
Erich Giebner	SED	
Else Girke	SED	
Hans Gleichmar	NDPD	
Berthold Göcks	LDPD	am 28. Februar 1957 verstorben
Erich Göritz	DBD	Berliner Vertreter
Gerald Götting	CDU	Stellvertreter des Präsidenten der Volkskammer
Margarete Götzelt	Genossenschaften	
Arnold Gohr	CDU	Berliner Vertreter
Ernst Goldenbaum	DBD	
Hans Gorzynski	CDU	am 18. Januar 1956 für den Abg. Dedek nachgerückt
Martin Grabow	CDU	
Hermann Gräfe	DBD	
Fritz Greuner	LDPD	
Grete Groh-Kummerlöw	FDGB	Stellvertreterin des Präsidenten der Volkskammer; Mitglied der SED
Roberta Gropper	FDGB	Berliner Vertreterin; Mitglied der SED
Otto Grotewohl	SED	
Herbert Gruß	FDGB	
Nelly Haalck	CDU	
Susanne Häber	DBD	
Franz Hahn	NDPD	
Georg Handke	SED	
Anna Hannig	DFD	
Hermann Harden	LDPD	
Ludwig Harms	CDU	am 11. Dezember 1957 für den Abg. Mittag nachgerückt
Robert Havemann	Kulturbund	Mitglied der SED
Klara Hedwig	DFD	
Gerhard Heerbach	DBD	Berliner Vertreter
Rolf Heider	FDJ	
Werner Heidinger	NDPD	
Emma Heinrich	CDU	am 16. April 1958 für den Abg. Nuschke nachgerückt
Artur Helbing	FDGB	
Katharina Helbing	DFD	Berliner Vertreterin
Eduard Hellwig	LDPD	am 28. Mai 1956 für den Abg. Herdegen nachgerückt
Leonhard Helmschrott	DBD	
Adolf Hennecke	SED	
Reinhold Hennig	NDPD	am 23. September 1955 Mandatsniederlegung, am 26. September 1955 mitgeteilt
Elsa Hentschke	SED	
Johannes Herdegen	LDPD	am 18. Januar 1956 Mitteilung über Erlöschen des Mandats
Martin Hermann	DBD	
Frida Hockauf	SED	
Fritz Hofer	FDJ	Berliner Vertreter
Ernst Hoffmann	SED	Berliner Vertreter
Heinz Hoffmann	SED	
Herbert Hoffmann	DBD	
Kurt Hoffmann	CDU	Berliner Vertreter am 18. Januar 1956 Mitteilung über Erlöschen des Mandats
Erhardt Hohmuth	DBD	
Bruno Holz	SED	
Heinrich Homann	NDPD	Stellvertreter des Präsidenten der Volkskammer
Erich Honecker	FDJ	
Gustav Hübner	FDGB	
Christel Iwersen	CDU	Berliner Vertreterin am 28. Februar 1958 verstorben
Anna Jahnke	DBD	
Wilhelm Jendras	DBD	
Karl Jünemann	CDU	
Erna Kadow	SED	Berliner Vertreterin
Hermann Kalb	CDU	
Otto Kalb	CDU	
Adolf Kalina	FDGB	
Gerhard Kalmring	LDPD	
Martha Kanow	VdgB	
Fritz Karguth	SED	am 12. März 1958 für den Abg. Ziller nachgerückt
Fritz Karsunke	DBD	
Rolf Kaulfersch	NDPD	
Karl Kayser	SED	
Wally Keller	DFD	
Katharina Kern	DFD	
Günter Kertzscher	SED	Berliner Vertreter
Heinz Keßler	FDJ	
Hans Kiefert	SED	
Bruno Kiesler	FDJ	
Ruth Kirchhoff	NDPD	
Walter Kirchhoff	NDPD	
Alfred Kirchner	SED	
Franz Kirchner	CDU	
Rudolf Kirchner	FDGB	
Victor Klemperer	Kulturbund	Mitglied der SED
Liselotte Klettner	DFD	
Karl Kneschke	Kulturbund	Mitglied der SED
Karl-Heinz Kniestedt	FDJ	Berliner Vertreter am 11. Dezember 1957 Vorstellung des Mandatsnachrückers
Ulrich Knothe	SED	
Minna Köhler	SED	
Wilhelm Koenen	SED	
Walter König	NDPD	
Erwin Körber	DBD	
Anna Kojetinski	FDGB	
Oswald Koltzenburg	NDPD	am 25. Februar 1956 verstorben
Egon Komarek	SED	
Inge Kornetzke	FDJ	Berliner Vertreter
Willi-Peter Konzok	LDPD	
Gertrud Korb	Kulturbund	
Maria Koreng	DBD	
Vilmos Korn	NDPD	
Otto Korrmann	DBD	
Werner Kraft	NDPD	
Johannes Kramer	CDU	
Richard Krams	SED	
Heinz Krause	FDJ	
Johanna Krause	DBD	
Walter Krause	Genossenschaften	Berliner Vertreter
Otto Krauss	LDPD	
Kurt Krenz	SED	
Horst Kreter	NDPD	
Erna Kriese	DFD	
Herbert Kröger	SED	
Richard Kromarek	VdgB	Berliner Vertreter
Anton Krückl	CDU	
Ernst Krüger	FDGB	Mitglied der SED
Greta Kuckhoff	SED	
Jürgen Kuczynski	Kulturbund	Mitglied der SED
Franz Kühler	CDU	Berliner Vertreter
Charlotte Küter	Kulturbund	
Albert Kummer	SED	
Paul Kurzawa	SED	
Ulrich Kuss	CDU	Berliner Vertreter
Herbert Landmann	CDU	Berliner Vertreter am 2. Juli 1958 für Christel Iwersen von der Berliner Stadtverordnetenversammlung gewählt
Werner Lang	SED	
Anna Lange	DFD	Berliner Vertreterin
Friedrich Lange	FDGB	
Fritz Lange	SED	
Werner Lange	FDJ	
Jutta Langenau	FDJ	
Helmut Lehmann	SED	
Leokardia Lehmann	FDGB	am 20. Mai 1955 für den Abg. Lucas nachgerückt am 2. November 1956 Mitteilung des Ausscheidens
Johannes Leipoldt	CDU	
Benno Lentzsch	FDGB	Berliner Vertreter
Harri Leupold	LDPD	Berliner Vertreter
Bruno Leuschner	SED	
Elisabeth Liebenthal	SED	
Günter Liebig	LDPD	am 2. November 1956 für die Abg. Dyck nachgerückt
Elsa Lippold	DBD	
Marianne List	LDPD	
Reinhold Lobedanz	CDU	am 5. März 1955 verstorben
Hans Loch	LDPD	
Heinz Lochar	FDGB	
Ursula Löbel	FDJ	
Jonny Löhr	NDPD	Berliner Vertreter
Ernst Lorenz	LDPD	
Kurt Lucas	FDGB	Niederlegung des Mandats am 20. Mai 1955
Gerhard Lucht	Genossenschaften	Mitglied der SED
Eva Ludwig	NDPD	Berliner Vertreter
Margarete Ludwig	CDU	
Kurt Lüftner	NDPD	
Franz Lukowiak	CDU	
Paul Luzemann	SED	
Ernst Makeprange	DBD	
Heinz-Wolfram Mascher	FDJ	Mitglied der CDU
Hermann Matern	SED	1. Stellvertreter des Präsidenten der Volkskammer
Gerhard Mattner	DBD	Berliner Vertreter
Eusebius Mayer	CDU	
Georg Mayer	SED	
Heinrich Meier	NDPD	
Helene Meinhold	FDGB	
Horst Meischner	NDPD	
Else Merke	DBD	
Herbert Mertha	FDGB	
Alexander Mette	Kulturbund	Berliner Vertreter
Alfred Meusel	Kulturbund	Mitglied der SED
Charlotte Mewes	DFD	
Karl Mewis	SED	
Siegfried Michl	FDGB	am 23. November 1954 verstorben Mitglied der SED
Robert Mittag	CDU	am 28. März 1957 verstorben
Hans Modrow	FDJ	Berliner Vertreter am 11. Dezember 1957 für den Abg. Kniestedt nachgerückt am 24. September 1958 Bekanntgabe der Wahl zum Fraktionsvorsitzenden; Mitglied der SED
Otto Möller	NDPD	
Karl Mörl	CDU	am 16. April 1958 für den Abg. Reiche nachgerückt
Horst Mohr	NDPD	
Heinrich Moritz	CDU	
Helga Mucke-Wittbrodt	DFD	Mitglied der SED
Erich Mückenberger	SED	
Frieda Müller	DBD	Berliner Vertreterin
Fritz Müller	DBD	
Hans Müller	FDGB	Berliner Vertreter
Helmut Müller	LDPD	
Max Müller	SED	
Vincenz Müller	NDPD	
Gerhard Münch	NDPD	
Ursula Muth	DFD	
Hans Nechels	SED	
Arndt Nestler	FDGB	
Barbara Neuhaus	DBD	Berliner Vertreterin
Heinz Neukrantz	FDGB	Berliner Vertreter
Alfred Neumann	SED	
Anni Neumann	FDGB	Mitglied der SED
Elfriede Neumann	DFD	Berliner Vertreterin
Wilhelm Neumann	FDGB	
Käthe Nipkow	FDGB	
Otto Nuschke	CDU	am 27. Dezember 1957 verstorben
Hans-Georg Oehm	CDU	
Fred Oelßner	SED	am 8. März 1958 Mandatsniederlegung, am 12. März 1958 in der Volkskammer verkündet
Georg Ohm	SED	am 20. Mai 1955 für die Abg. Arndt nachgerückt
Veronika Olbrich	CDU	am 8. August 1956 verstorben
Max Opitz	SED	
Gerhard Ortmann	DBD	
Hermann Oschatz	NDPD	
Herbert Ott	LDPD	
Adolf Otto	LDPD	
Martha Pässold	DBD	
Fritz Panteleit	DBD	
Margarethe Paul	NDPD	
Maria Pawlowski	DFD	
Anneliese Pech	LDPD	Berliner Vertreterin
Leopold Pertek	SED	Berliner Vertreter
Johann Peters	DBD	
Walter Petersohn	SED	
Friedrich Pfaffenbach	NDPD	Berliner Vertreter
Susanne Pfannenberg	CDU	
Eugen Pfeiffer	CDU	
Paul Pflock	LDPD	
Erwin Pingel	DBD	
Hans Pitra	SED	Berliner Vertreter
Anton Plenikowski	SED	
Arthur Plötz	SED	
Hermann Pobering	DBD	am 14. November 1955 verstorben
Karl Polak	SED	
Lydia Poser	SED	
Charlotte Praechter	DFD	
Charlotte Praße	DFD	
Rudolf Prüfer	SED	
Emma Puppel	VdgB	
Ernst-August Rabe	LDPD	
Erich Rätsch	SED	
Heinrich Rau	SED	
Ernst Rauer	SED	
Eitel-Friedrich Rechel	CDU	
Fritz Reck	SED	Berliner Vertreter
Erich Rehberg	FDGB	Berliner Vertreter
Elly Rehn	DFD	
Fritz Reiche	CDU	am 31. Oktober 1957 verstorben
Heinz Reiche	DBD	
Hans Reichelt	DBD	
Rudi Reinwarth	NDPD	
Marianne Richter	DFD	
Martin Richter	NDPD	
Fritz Rick	CDU	am 20. Mai 1955 für den Abg. Lobedanz nachgerückt
Hans Rietz	DBD	
Otto Ringel	SED	am 12. April 1956 verstorben
Heinz Ritter	LDPD	
Paul Roch	DBD	
Ilse Rodenberg	NDPD	
Heinz Röhrer	CDU	
Wolfgang Rösser	NDPD	
Berthold Rose	DBD	
Siegfried Roth	NDPD	
Erwin Rothe	SED	
Hertha Rudat	FDGB	
Martha Rudolph	CDU	
Hans Rüdiger	NDPD	
Otto Rühle	NDPD	
Antje Ruge	DFD	Berliner Vertreterin
Willy Rumpf	SED	
Margarete Rupp	DFD	
Hermann Ruthenberg	SED	
Otto Sadler	CDU	
Aenne Saefkow	SED	Berliner Vertreterin
Willy Sägebrecht	SED	Berliner Vertreter
Kurt Säuberlich	Kulturbund	
Gertrud Sasse	LDPD	
Max Schädel	FDGB	
Elisabeth Schäfer	NDPD	
Willy Schäfer	DBD	
Ella Schaffernicht	SED	
Rolaf Schahn	FDJ	
Herbert Schalwat	FDGB	
Heinrich Schaub	LDPD	
Rudi Scheffler	SED	
Fritz Schenk	DBD	
Johann Schewczyk	SED	Berliner Vertreter
Erika Schildmann	NDPD	
Rosa Schilling	DFD	
Karl Schirdewan	SED	am 24. Februar 1958 Mandatsniederlegung, am 12. März in der Volkskammer verkündet
Wilhelmine Schirmer-Pröscher	DFD	Stellvertreterin des Präsidenten der Volkskammer; Mitglied der LDPD
Wilhelm Schleef	SED	
Erwin Schlemmer	SED	
Willi Schlesier	FDGB	
Artur Schlesinger	LDPD	Berliner Vertreter
Hermann Schlimme	FDGB	am 10. November 1955 verstorben Mitglied der SED
Käte Schmerse	SED	
Else Schmidt	DBD	
Erna Schmidt	FDGB	
Heinrich Schmidt	DBD	
Richard Schmidt	SED	
Berthold Schmitt	SED	
Brunhilde Schmook	DFD	
Gabriele Schneider	DFD	
Günter Schneider	LDPD	
Max Schneider	NDPD	Berliner Vertreter
Hans Schnitzler	DBD	
Georg Scholz	LDPD	
Paul Scholz	DBD	
Werner Schubert	SED	
Eleonore Schumann	LDPD	
Otto Schwarz	Kulturbund	
Max Sefrin	CDU	
Kurt Seibt	SED	
Ernst Seifert	FDGB	
Alfred Seiffarth	NDPD	
Hans Seigewasser	SED	
Fritz Selbmann	SED	
Charlotte Sembdner	NDPD	
Ernst Setzepfand	SED	am 16. August 1958 verstorben
Max Seydewitz	SED	
Ewald Sieg	DBD	
Wilhelm Sieg	VdgB	am 28. Mai 1956 für den Abg. Zimmermann nachgerückt
Gustav Siemon	NDPD	
Otto Sierau	FDGB	
Paul Simon	SED	
Robert Sommer	LDPD	am 14. September 1957 verstorben
Fritz Sonnenburg	CDU	
Hermann Spencker	LDPD	
Gerhard Spremberg	SED	am 12. März 1958 für den Abg. Wollweber nachgerückt
Max Steffen	SED	
Luitpold Steidle	CDU	
Charlotte Steinhaus	CDU	
Siegfried Steudte	FDJ	
Franz Steuter	LDPD	Berliner Vertreter
Willi Stoph	SED	
Herbert Streich	FDJ	
Erich Streicher	SED	
Franz Striemann	FDGB	
Edgar Strümpfel	DBD	
Rudolf Sturm	FDJ	
Max Suhrbier	LDPD	
Ingeburg Tauschke	Genossenschaften	
Herta Tetzlaff	SED	Berliner Vertreterin
Rosa Thälmann	DFD	
Ilse Thiele	DFD	
Herbert Thieme	FDGB	am 12. Januar 1955 für den Abg. Michl nachgerückt
Fritz Thiemes	DBD	Berliner Vertreter
Wilhelm Thiemke	FDGB	Berliner Vertreter
Walter Thierfelder	LDPD	
Kurt Thinius	LDPD	
Walter Thürmer	LDPD	
Walter Tille	FDGB	Mitglied der SED
Käthe Timm	CDU	am 2. März 1955 für den Abg. Ganter-Gilmans nachgerückt
Heinrich Toeplitz	CDU	
Alfred Tottewitz	LDPD	
Ferdinand Trauboth	NDPD	
Erich Uhlich	SED	
Walter Ulbricht	SED	
Erich Ullmann	LDPD	
Irma Uschkamp	DFD	
Karl-Heinz Vetter	CDU	
Paul Voitel	SED	
Paul Vollmert	DBD	am 28. Mai 1956 für den Abg. Pobering nachgerückt
Erich Wächter	CDU	
Walter Wagner	CDU	
Rosel Walther	NDPD	
Paul Wandel	SED	
Hans Warnke	SED	
Herbert Warnke	FDGB	Mitglied der SED
Herbert Waschke	SED	
Klaus Wegner	FDGB	
Friedrich Wehmer	VdgB	Mitglied der SED
Günther Wehnert	LDPD	am 8. Januar 1958 für den Abg. Sommer nachgerückt
Cecilie Weidenbach-Blum	FDGB	
Elsa Weigelt	SED	
Anna Weimann	SED	Berliner Vertreterin
Hans-Joachim Weinhold	FDJ	
Josef Weiser	FDJ	
Siegrid Weiß	FDJ	
Erich Wendt	Kulturbund	Mitglied der SED
Josef Wenig	FDGB	
Otto Werner	DBD	
Wilhelm Werner	NDPD	
Harald Werthmann	LDPD	Berliner Vertreter
Hans Wiedemann	CDU	
Georg Wiesemüller	CDU	Berliner Vertreter
Horst Willim	FDGB	Mitglied der SED
Hans-Joachim Winkler	FDGB	Mitglied der SED
Martha Winkler	SED	
Otto Winzer	SED	
Else Witt	DFD	am 29. August 1956 wurde Nachrückerin für sie vorgestellt
Margarete Wittkowski	SED	
Hans-Werner Woiczik	FDJ	
Richard Wolf	SED	Berliner Vertreter
Fritz Wolff	LDPD	
Ernst Wollweber	SED	
Herbert Worch	DBD	
Kurt Wünsche	LDPD	
Joseph Wujciak	CDU	
Alfred Wunderlich	NDPD	
Alfred Zeidler	LDPD	am 22. Mai 1957 für den Abg. Göcks nachgerückt
Gerhart Ziller	SED	am 14. Dezember 1957 Tod durch Suizid
Max Zimmermann	VdgB	am 18. Januar 1956 Mitteilung über Erlöschen des Mandats
Max Zipfel	CDU	
Alfred Zirnstein	DBD	
Arnold Zweig	Kulturbund	
