= Presidium of the Volkskammer =

The Presidium of the People's Chamber was a group of members of the People's Chamber responsible for conducting its activities.

It consisted of representatives of parties and mass organizations, represented in the People's Chamber. The presidium was headed by the President of the People's Chamber.

== 1. Legislative Session (1950–1954) ==
President	Party
Johannes Dieckmann	LDPD
Vice Presidents	Party
Hermann Matern; Gerald Götting; Ernst Goldenbaum; Heinrich Homann (to December 17, 1952); Vincenz Müller (from 1953)	SED; CDU; DBD; NDPD; NDPD
Members	Party/organization
Friedrich Ebert Jr. Wilhelmine Schirmer-Pröscher; Erich Geske (from 1953); Grete Groh-Kummerlöw	SED; DFD; SDA; FDGB

== 2. Legislative Session (1954–1958) ==
President	Party
Johannes Dieckmann	LDPD
First Deputy President	Party
Hermann Matern	SED
Deputy Presidents	Party/organization
Friedrich Ebert Jr. Gerald Götting; Wilhelmine Schirmer-Pröscher; Grete Groh-Kummerlöw	SED; CDU; DFD; FDGB

== 3. Legislative Session (1958–1963) ==
President	Party
Johannes Dieckmann	LDPD
First Deputy President	Party
Hermann Matern	SED
Deputy Presidents	Party/organization
Friedrich Ebert Jr. August Bach; Ernst Goldenbaum; Wilhelmine Schirmer-Pröscher; Grete Groh-Kummerlöw	SED; CDU; DBD; DFD; FDGB

== 4. Legislative Session (1963–1967) ==
President	Party
Johannes Dieckmann	LDPD
Deputy President	Party
Hermann Matern	SED
Members	Party/organization
August Bach (died in 1966); Hermann Kalb; Wilhelmine Schirmer-Pröscher; Otto Gotschke; Ernst Goldenbaum; Grete Groh-Kummerlöw; Jonny Löhr	CDU; CDU; DFD; SED; DBD; FDGB; NDPD

== 5. Legislative Session (1967–1971) ==
President	Party
Johannes Dieckmann (died on February 22, 1969); Gerald Götting (from May 12, 1969)	LDPD; CDU
Deputy President	Party
Hermann Matern (died on January 24, 1971); Friedrich Ebert Jr. (from 1971)	SED
Members	Party/organization
Hermann Kalb (to 1969); Wilhelmine Schirmer-Pröscher; Otto Gotschke; Ernst Goldenbaum; Grete Groh-Kummerlöw; Margaret Müller; Willi-Peter Konzok (from 1969); Karl-Heinz Schulmeister (from May 1969); Werner Engst (from 1969)	CDU; DFD; SED; DBD; FDGB; SED; LDPD; KB; FDJ

== 7. Legislative Session (1971–1976) ==
President	Party
Gerald Götting	CDU
Deputy President	Party
Friedrich Ebert Jr.	SED
Members	Party/organization
Erich Mückenberger; Wilhelmine Schirmer-Pröscher; Heinz Eichler; Karl-Heinz Schulmeister; Egon Krenz; Ernst Goldenbaum; Willi-Peter Konzok; Margarete Müller; Wolfgang Rösser	SED; DFD; SED; KB; FDJ; DBD; LDPD; FDGB; NDPD

== 8. Legislative Session (1976–1981) ==
President	Party
Horst Sindermann	SED
Deputy President	Party
Friedrich Ebert Jr. (died on December 4, 1979); Gerald Götting (elected on July 3, 1980)	SED; CDU
Members	Party/organization
Wolfgang Heyl; Erich Mückenberger; Wilhelmine Schirmer-Pröscher; Heinz Eichler; Karl-Heinz Schulmeister; Willi-Peter Konzok; Wolfgang Rösser; Egon Krenz; Hans Rietz; Johanna Töpfer	CDU; SED; DFD; SED; KB; LDPD; NDPD; FD; DBD; FDGB

== 8. Legislative Session (1981–1986) ==
President	Party
Horst Sindermann	SED
Deputy President	Party
Gerald Götting	CSU
Members	Party/organization
Willi-Peter Konzuk; Rudolf Agsten (from 1983); Wolfgang Heyl; Erich Mückenberger; Wilhelmine Schirmer-Pröscher; Heinz Eichler; Karl-Heinz Schulmeister; Ernst Mecklenburg; Rudi Rothe (from 1982); Werner Heilemann; Eberhard Aurich; Wolfgang Rösser	LDPD; LDPD; CDU; SED; DFD; SED; KB; DBD; DBD; FDGB; FDJ; NDPD

== 9. Legislative Session (1986–1990) ==
=== First Presidium (1986–1989) ===
President	Party
Horst Sindermann	SED
Deputy President	Party
Gerald Götting	CDU
Members	Party/organization
Rudolf Agsten; Heinz Eichler; Günther Hartmann; Werner Heilemann; Wolfgang Heyl; Günther Maleuda; Erich Mückenberger; Manfred Scheler; Wilhelmine Schirmer-Pröscher; Karl-Heinz Schulmeister; Volker Voigt	LDPD; SED; NDPD; FDGB; CDU; DBD; SED; VdgB; DFD; KB; FDJ

=== Second Presidium (1989–1990) ===
President	Party
Günther Maleuda	DBD
Deputy President	Party
Werner Jarowinsky (November 1989 – January 1990); Käte Niederkirchner (from January 11, 1990)	SED (to November 16, 1989) SED-PDS (from November 16, 1989); SED-PDS (to February 4, 1990) PDS (from February 4, 1990)
Members	Party/organization
Heinz Eichler; Günther Hartmann; Wolfgang Heyl (to November 16, 1989); Adolf Niggemeier (from November 17, 1989); Michael Koplanski; Käte Niederkirchner (to January 11, 1990); Heinz Albrecht (from January 11, 1990); Hans-Dieter Raspe; Christel Bednareck (to January 11, 1990); Siegfried Hanusch (from January 11, 1990); Eva Rohmann; Manfred Scheler; Karl-Heinz Schulmeister; Cornelia Wolfram	SED; NDPD; CDU; CDU; DBD; SED; SED; LDPD; FDGB; FDGB; DFD; VdgB; KB; FDJ

== 10. Legislative Session (1990) ==
President	Party
Sabine Bergmann-Pohl	CDU
Deputy Presidents	Party
Reinhard Höppner; Käte Niederkirchner; Stefan Gottschall; Jürgen Schmieder; Wolfgang Ullmann; Dieter Helm	SPD; PDS; DSU; BFD; B90; DBD
Members	Party
Dagmar Enkelmann; Juliane Grehn; Eberhard Goldhahn; Martin Gutzeit; Frank Heltzig; Paul Krüger; Dieter Hoffmann; Susanne Seils; Harald-Dietrich Kühne; Conrad-Michael Lehnert; Bernd Meier; Lothar Piche; Matthias Platzeck; Stefanie Rehm	PDS; CDU; CDU; SPD; SPD; CDU; BFD; SPD; CDU; BFD; PDS; DSU; B90/DG; CDU
