= Bernsdorf =

Bernsdorf may refer to places in Germany and the Czech Republic:

Germany

- Bernsdorf, Upper Lusatia, in the district of Bautzen, Saxony
- Bernsdorf, Zwickau, in the district of Zwickau, Saxony

Czech Republic

- Bernsdorf (bei Trautenau), (historical name of) Bernartice (Trutnov District), in Trutnov District
- Bernsdorf, (historical name of) Bernartice nad Odrou in Nový Jičín District
