= List of political office-holders in East Germany =

This is a list of political office-holders in East Germany. The political leadership of East Germany was distributed between several offices. However, until the Volkskammer removed a section in the East German constitution guaranteeing their monopoly on political power on 1 December 1989, the Socialist Unity Party of Germany (SED) held ultimate power and authority over state and government. Thus, the head of the SED's Politburo of the Central Committee was the de facto leader of the country.

== Overview ==
Logo of the Socialist Unity Party of Germany

The political leadership of East Germany was distributed between several offices. The Socialist Unity Party of Germany (SED) and its leader held ultimate power and authority over state and government.

Prior to the proclamation of an East German state, the Soviets established the German Economic Commission (DWK) in 1948 as a de facto government in their occupation zone. Its chairman was Heinrich Rau.

On 7 October 1949 an East German state, called the German Democratic Republic (GDR), was proclaimed and took over governmental functions from the DWK, largely with the same leading figures.

Until 1 December 1989, the most important position in the GDR was that of the Leader of the Socialist Unity Party of Germany (SED), first titled chairman from 1946 to 1950, then as the First Secretary between 1950 and 1976 and finally titled General Secretary. The first article of the GDR's constitution contained a section granting the SED a monopoly on power, making the SED's leader the de facto leader of the country. He and the party Politburo, which he headed, set all policy, with both cabinet, state council and parliament acting as a rubber stamp implementing their decisions.

The formal head of state was originally the President of the German Democratic Republic. After the death of incumbent Wilhelm Pieck in 1960, the office was replaced by a collective body as head of state, the State Council. The position of chairman was the de facto head of state and commonly held by the party leader.

The government was headed by the Council of Ministers and its chairman, sometimes colloquially called Prime Minister. However, all the decisions were made by the party, with the cabinet implementing them. Indeed, the SED Central Committee had committees mirroring the cabinet departments.

Other institutions included the Volkskammer, the legislature whose sessions were chaired by a President, and, since 1960, the National Defense Council, which held supreme command of the GDR's armed forces and had unlimited authority over the State in time of war. The Council was composed exclusively of members of the SED's Central Committee and Politburo, with the party leader serving as Chairman of the National Defense Council.

The political landscape was completely changed by the Peaceful Revolution in late 1989, which saw the SED having to relinquish its monopoly on political power in favour of the Council of Ministers, the National Defense Council and the State Council being abolished. The remaining institutions were the People's Chamber, whose President became head of state by default for the remainder of the GDR's existence, and the Council of Ministers, both soon constituted on basis of the country's first and only democratic elections in March 1990. The GDR joined the Federal Republic of Germany on 3 October 1990

== List of leaders ==
=== Titles ===
- Minister-President (1949–1950)
- De facto leader (1950–1990)
  - First Secretary of the Central Committee (1950–1976)
  - General Secretary of the Central Committee (1976–1989)
  - Chairman of the Council of Ministers (1989–1990)
- Minister-President (1990)

Name (Lifespan)	Portrait	Period	Congress(es)	Political offices	Premier	President	Policies
Walter Ulbricht (1893–1973)		25 July 1950 ↓ 26 April 1971	3rd; 4th; 5th; 6th; 7th	First Secretary of the Socialist Unity Party (Note: Titled General Secretary until 1953); Chairman of the State Council (1960–1973); Chairman of the National Defense Council (1960–1971); First Deputy Chairman of the Council of Ministers (Note: "Deputy Minister-President" until 24 November 1955, then "First Deputy Minister-President" until 8 December 1958)(1949–1960)	Otto Grotewohl; Willi Stoph	Wilhelm Pieck himself	Stalinism • Construction of Socialism (1950–54) • Farm collectivization (1952–61) • Ten Commandments of Socialist Morality and Ethics (1958–76) • New Economic System (1963–68) • Economic System of Socialism (1968–70)
Walter Ulbricht (1893–1973)		Ever since the merger of the KPD and SPD, Ulbricht was one of the leading figures in the Socialist Unity Party, largely due to his good relationship with the Soviets. Originally led de jure in parity by former SPD Central Committee Co-Chairman Otto Grotewohl and senile former KPD leader Wilhelm Pieck, Ulbricht was elected First Secretary of the Socialist Unity Party on 25 July 1950, solidifying his leading role of both country and party.					Stalinism • Construction of Socialism (1950–54) • Farm collectivization (1952–61) • Ten Commandments of Socialist Morality and Ethics (1958–76) • New Economic System (1963–68) • Economic System of Socialism (1968–70)
Erich Honecker (1912–1994)		26 April 1971 ↓ 17 October 1989	8th; 9th; 10th; 11th	General Secretary of the Socialist Unity Party (Note: Honecker held the same position under the title of First Secretary until 1976); Chairman of the State Council (1976–1989); Chairman of the National Defense Council	Willi Stoph; Horst Sindermann; Willi Stoph	Walter Ulbricht; Willi Stoph himself	• Unity of Economic and Social Policy (1971–89) • Rapprochement (1971–89)
Erich Honecker (1912–1994)		The failure of Ulbricht's Economic System of Socialism to raise the GDR's economic competitiveness and his bad relationship with new Soviet leader Leonid Brezhnev opened an opportunity for Honecker, formerly Ulbricht's protégé and powerful Central Committee Secretary, to depose him. After assembling a majority of the Politburo against him, he finally received Brezhnev's approval in the spring of 1971, thereafter driving to Ulbricht's Döllnsee summer residence on 26 April and forcing him to resign .					• Unity of Economic and Social Policy (1971–89) • Rapprochement (1971–89)
Egon Krenz (1937–)		17 October 1989 ↓ 5 December 1989	—	General Secretary of the Socialist Unity Party; Chairman of the State Council; Chairman of the National Defense Council	Willi Stoph; Hans Modrow	himself	• Glasnost • Perestroika
Egon Krenz (1937–)		By the late 1980s, the GDRs economy was in crisis, with the unsustainable debt burden rising every year to finance the country's generous welfare system. By summer 1989, an opposition movement had formed that the ruling class was unable to deal with. In addition, Honecker's health was failing and he became increasingly oblivious to the situation in the country. On 17 October 1989, Egon Krenz, Honecker's protégé and youngest Politburo member, deposed Honecker in the Politburo. Honecker announced his resignation a day later in the Central Committee, citing his failing health, and proposed Krenz as his successor.					• Glasnost • Perestroika
Hans Modrow (1928–2023)		5 December 1989 ↓ 12 April 1990	—	Chairman of the Council of Ministers	himself	Egon Krenz; Manfred Gerlach; Sabine Bergmann-Pohl (interim)	Round Table • Democratization
Hans Modrow (1928–2023)		On 7 November 1989, Willi Stoph resigned as Chairman of the Council of Ministers. His replacement, former First Secretary of the Socialist Unity Party in Bezirk Dresden Modrow, stressed his independence towards the SED's leadership upon his election by the Volkskammer on 13 November. After the Volkskammer removed the section in the GDR's constitution guaranteeing their monopoly on political power on 1 December 1989, Modrow became the de facto leader of the GDR on 5 December 1989 and a day later Krenz resigning as head of state.					Round Table • Democratization
Lothar de Maizière (born 1940)		12 April 1990 ↓ 2 October 1990	—	Minister-President	himself	Sabine Bergmann-Pohl (interim)	German reunification • Privatization
Lothar de Maizière (born 1940)		The 1990 Volkskammer election, the first and only free elections of the GDR, saw a victory for the Alliance for Germany electoral coalition and chiefly the Christian Democratic Union, led by de Maizière. The Volkskammer elected him as Minister-President on 12 April 1990.					German reunification • Privatization

== Leaders of the Socialist Unity Party of Germany (SED) ==
No.	Portrait	Name	Took office	Left office	Time in office	Party
Joint Chairmen of the Socialist Unity Party Vorsitzende der Sozialistischen Einheitspartei Deutschlands
.	Wilhelm Pieck	Wilhelm Pieck (1876–1960)	22 April 1946	25 July 1950	4 years, 94 days	SED
.	Otto Grotewohl	Otto Grotewohl (1894–1964)	22 April 1946	25 July 1950	4 years, 94 days	SED
General Secretary of the Central Committee (First Secretary of the Central Committee 1953–1976) Generalsekretär/Erster Sekretär des Zentralkommitees
1	Walter Ulbricht	Walter Ulbricht (1893–1973)	25 July 1950	3 May 1971	20 years, 282 days	SED
2	Erich Honecker	Erich Honecker (1912–1994)	3 May 1971	18 October 1989	18 years, 168 days	SED
3	Egon Krenz	Egon Krenz (born 1937)	18 October 1989	6 December 1989	49 days	SED
(Honorary) Chairman of the Central Committee Vorsitzender des Zentralkommitees
1	Walter Ulbricht	Walter Ulbricht (1893–1973)	3 May 1971	1 August 1973 †	2 years, 90 days	SED

On 1 December 1989, the People's Chamber removed the section of the East German Constitution granting the SED a monopoly of power—thus ending Communist rule in East Germany. Before the month was out, the SED transformed from a Leninist cadre party into a democratic socialist party, renaming itself first to Socialist Unity Party — Party of Democratic Socialism and later in the same year, to Party of Democratic Socialism (PDS). Hence, the party's three subsequent leaders — Gregor Gysi (1989–1993), Lothar Bisky (1993–2000; 2003-2007), and Gabi Zimmer (2000–2003) — were no more leaders of East Germany than the leaders of other parties.

== Heads of state ==
No.	Portrait	Name	Took office	Left office	Time in office	Party
President of the Republic Präsident der Republik
–	Johannes Dieckmann	Johannes Dieckmann (1893–1969); Acting	7 October 1949	11 October 1949	4 days	LDPD
1	Wilhelm Pieck	Wilhelm Pieck (1876–1960)	11 October 1949	7 September 1960 †	10 years, 332 days	SED
–	Johannes Dieckmann	Johannes Dieckmann (1893–1969); Acting	7 September 1960	12 September 1960	5 days	LDPD
Chairman of the State Council Vorsitzender des Staatsrats
1	Walter Ulbricht	Walter Ulbricht (1893–1973)	12 September 1960	1 August 1973 †	12 years, 323 days	SED
–	Friedrich Ebert Jr.	Friedrich Ebert Jr. (1894–1979); Acting	1 August 1973	3 October 1973	63 days	SED
2	Willi Stoph	Willi Stoph (1914–1999)	3 October 1973	29 October 1976	3 years, 26 days	SED
3	Erich Honecker	Erich Honecker (1912–1994)	29 October 1976	24 October 1989	12 years, 360 days	SED
4	Egon Krenz	Egon Krenz (born 1937)	24 October 1989	6 December 1989	43 days	SED
5	Manfred Gerlach	Manfred Gerlach (1928–2011)	6 December 1989	5 April 1990	120 days	LDPD
President of the People's Chamber (Note: On 5 April 1990, the State Council was abolished and its responsibilities – including those it took over from the National Defence Council – were transferred to the Presidium of the People's Chamber, with the President of the latter body serving as interim head of state and interim commander-in-chief.) Präsident der Volkskammer
–	Sabine Bergmann-Pohl	Sabine Bergmann-Pohl (born 1946)	5 April 1990	2 October 1990	180 days	CDU

== Heads of government ==
No.	Portrait	Name	Took office	Left office	Time in office	Party
Minister-President Ministerpräsident
1	Otto Grotewohl	Otto Grotewohl (1894–1964)	12 October 1949	8 December 1958 (office renamed)	9 years, 57 days	SED
Chairman of the Council of Ministers Vorsitzender des Ministerrats
1	Otto Grotewohl	Otto Grotewohl (1894–1964)	8 December 1958	21 September 1964 †	5 years, 288 days	SED
2	Willi Stoph	Willi Stoph (1914–1999)	21 September 1964	3 October 1973	9 years, 12 days	SED
3	Horst Sindermann	Horst Sindermann (1915–1990)	3 October 1973	29 October 1976	3 years, 26 days	SED
(2)	Willi Stoph	Willi Stoph (1914–1999)	29 October 1976	13 November 1989	13 years, 15 days	SED
4	Hans Modrow	Hans Modrow (1928–2023)	13 November 1989	12 April 1990	150 days	SED; PDS
Minister-President Ministerpräsident
5	Lothar de Maizière	Lothar de Maizière (born 1940)	12 April 1990	2 October 1990	173 days	CDU

== Heads of parliament ==
No.	Portrait	Name	Took office	Left office	Time in office	Party
President of the People's Chamber Präsident der Volkskammer
1	Johannes Dieckmann	Johannes Dieckmann (1893–1969)	7 October 1949	22 February 1969 †	19 years, 138 days	LDPD
2	Gerald Götting	Gerald Götting (1923–2015)	12 May 1969	29 October 1976	7 years, 170 days	CDU
3	Horst Sindermann	Horst Sindermann (1915–1990)	29 October 1976	13 November 1989	13 years, 15 days	SED
4	Günther Maleuda	Günther Maleuda (1931–2012)	13 November 1989	5 April 1990	143 days	DBD
5	Sabine Bergmann-Pohl	Sabine Bergmann-Pohl (born 1946)	5 April 1990	2 October 1990	180 days	CDU

== Heads of the military ==
Standard of the chairman of the National Defence Council

No.	Portrait	Chairman of the National Defence Council Vorsitzender des Nationalen Verteidigungsrates	Took office	Left office	Time in office	Party
1	Walter Ulbricht	Walter Ulbricht (1893–1973)	10 February 1960	3 May 1971	11 years, 82 days	SED
2	Erich Honecker	Erich Honecker (1912–1994)	3 May 1971	18 October 1989	18 years, 168 days	SED
3	Egon Krenz	Egon Krenz (born 1937)	18 October 1989	6 December 1989	49 days	SED
Chairman of the State Council Vorsitzender des Staatsrats (Note: On 6 December 1989, the National Defence Council was dismissed en masse and its responsibilities were transferred to the State Council, with the Chairman of the latter body now serving not only as Head of state but also as commander-in-chief.)
–	Manfred Gerlach	Manfred Gerlach (1928–2011)	6 December 1989	5 April 1990	120 days	LDPD
President of the People's Chamber Präsident der Volkskammer
–	Sabine Bergmann-Pohl	Sabine Bergmann-Pohl (born 1946)	5 April 1990	2 October 1990	180 days	CDU

== See also ==
- List of monarchs of Germany
- President of Germany
- President of Germany (1919–1945)
- List of presidents of Germany
- Chancellor of Germany
- List of chancellors of Germany
