= Käte Niederkirchner =

German politician (1944-2019)

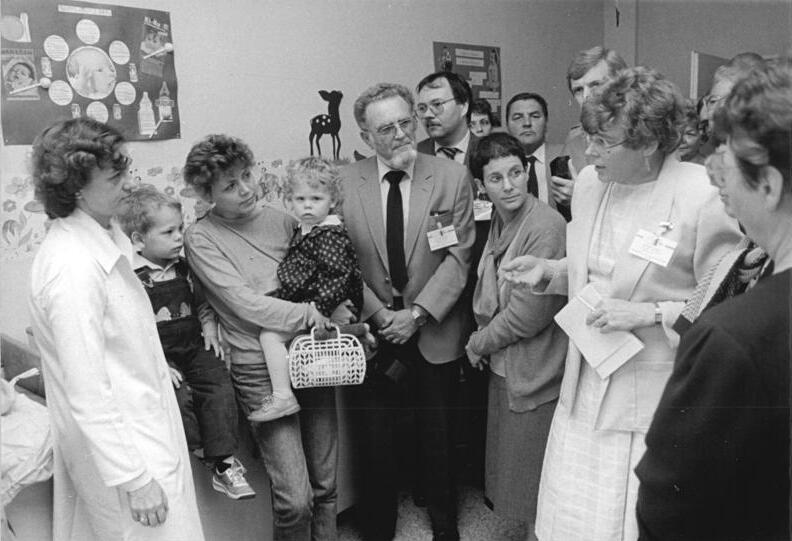
- Dr. Niederkirchner (on the left) welcomes one of six working groups from an international delegation of city mayors visiting Berlin on a fact-finding tour, to witness a mothers' advice session at the "Friedrich Wolf" out-patient clinic in Berlin-Lichtenberg 1987
- Born: Käte Appel (in the Soviet Union); Käte Dienstbach (in Germany); 30 January 1944; Chelyabinsk, Chelyabinsk Oblast, Soviet Union
- Died: 19 November 2019; Berlin-Lichtenberg, Germany
- Education: Berlin; Charité
- Occupations: Pediatrician; Politician
- Political party: SED; PDS
- Spouse: Jürgen Sima
- Children: 1
- Parent(s): Karl Dienstbach (1900-1977: aka "Karl Appel"); Mia Niederkirchner (1911-1982)

Käte Niederkirchner (born Käte Appel or Käte Dienstbach: 30 January 1944 - 19 November 2019) was a German politician (SED / PDS) and pediatrician. In 1967 she became the youngest member of the East German parliament ("Volkskammer"). Her life was impacted by having been born with a famous aunt, the Communist resistance activist Käthe Niederkirchner who was killed by Nazi paramilitaries at Ravensbrück concentration camp in 1944, and who was posthumously much celebrated by East Germany's political leadership.

== Early life ==
Käte Appel was born at Chelyabinsk, an industrial city east of the Urals. "Appel", the family name by which she was known to comrades, was her father's party pseudonym. Her father's name had been Karl Dienstbach when he had emigrated to the Soviet Union in 1932 in order to avoid the prison term to which he had been sentenced at a district court in Frankenthal following his conviction on a charge of industrial espionage. During the 1920s Karl Dienstbach (1900–1977) had come to the attention of the authorities in Germany as a vociferous trades unionist and Communist activist. Käte Dienstbach's mother, Mia Niederkirchner (1911–1982), was also a political activist, living in Soviet exile at the time of Käte's birth. Her parents had originally met in the Hotel Lux in Moscow, which during the Hitler years had become a vast hostel for exiled German communists. During the final years of the war both her parents were working with prisoners of war in the Gulag network around Chelyabinsk, as political educators for the National Committee for a Free Germany. According to another source her parents were both working as officials at a prisoner of war camp, her mother as a secretary and her father as a cook.

In approximately 1946 the family were returned to Germany, settling in the region administered as the Soviet occupation zone, and in 1949 relaunched as the Soviet sponsored German Democratic Republic (East Germany). As a child she was often taken along by her mother to events celebrating and commemorating her Aunt Käthe (frequently identified as "Katja", which sounded more Russian than Käthe or Käte). As a close relative of this heroic figure she was frequently introduced to members of workers' collectives and brigades and to public officials at events arranged to highlight the renaming of a street or school or factory in honour of her aunt. Political engagement was "normal" for the family, as she later told an interviewer. As a school girl she was a group leader in the Young Pioneers. She successfully completed her schooling at the Käthe Kollwitz senior school (subsequently renamed) in 1962 and in 1963 enrolled at Berlin University to study for a degree in Medicine. She received her first degree in 1969 and her doctorate (still in Medicine) in 1970. Her doctoral research and dissertation concerned metabolic changes in the vascular wall characteristic of chronic Vitamin-D intoxication.

== Political career ==
By the time she graduated Käte Dienstbach had already embarked on an unusually precocious career as a politician. She joined the party in 1965. In 1967 she married a fellow medical student, Jürgen Sima, who later became Head Physician at the hospital in Berlin-Weissensee. It was also in 1967, still a Berlin medical student, that she was nominated for election to the East German parliament ("Volkskammer") as one of the 40 candidates representing the youth wing (FDJ) of the party (SED), listed at this stage as "Käte Dienstbach". Under the single list voting system that operated in East Germany, nomination to the candidates list meant nomination to the Volkskammer. Still aged only 23 in 1967, Käte Dienstbach continued to be the youngest member of the parliament until the next election. Between 1967 and 1976 she was a member of the parliamentary committee for people's education. In 1976 she became a member of the parliamentary health committee. As a committee member she found herself at odds with the minister, a man with strong views of his own who failed to value Käte Sima's opinions. In the parliament she voted in favour of the hotly contested 1972 abortion law. Her position on the issue, as a doctor, was increasingly opposed to abortion, having had first-hand experience through her work of the adverse health consequences to which it can lead. But as a woman she continued to believe that it must be for the individual woman to choose whether or not to bring a child into the world: legislators should not purport to second-guess that decision.

During 1969/70, after receiving her first degree, and while working on her doctoral dissertation, Käte Sima took a fulltime job with the governing Central Council of the Young Socialist organisation (FDJ), serving as FDJ-secretary for the university medical faculty. After a year she moved on, in 1970 to the Charité (hospital) where for the next five years she trained as a specialist doctor in children's medicine. It was during this period, in 1972, that her own daughter was born. Five years later, in 1977, Jürgen and Käte Sima's marriage ended in divorce.

A distant relative was by this time using the "Niederkirchner" name to his own advantage, letting it be thought that he was the "official" representative of the family. Following her divorce Käte Dienstbach / Sima / Niederkirchner decided to reassert her own rights to her aunt's name, identifying herself as Käte Sima-Niederkirchner both with regard to her work in the national parliament and in respect of her professional Paediatrics work at the hospital. By 1981 she was sitting in the Volkskammer not as a representative of the FDJ, but as a part of the larger SED parliamentary group. Later, at some point between 1986 and 1990, she reverted to using the name Käte Niederkirchner which, thanks to her aunt's fame, still resonated powerfully in the German Democratic Republic. It is as "Käte Niederkirchner" that she was identified after 1990 and in most posthumous sources.

== In United Germany ==
1989 was a year of changes. On 13 November 1989, as the ruling party prepared to rebrand and relaunch itself in anticipation of a more democratic future, and less than three weeks before the resignation of the entire Central Committee, including the Politburo, Käte Niederkirchner became a member of the newly elected 11 member praesidium of the "Volkskammer". For the first time in the history of the German Democratic Republic, the praesidium election took place during a meeting held in front of television cameras, and the election modalities involved a secret ballot of Volkskammer members. On 11 January 1990, following the resignation from the "Volkskammer" of Werner Jarowinsky (who was a politburo old-timer), Käte Niederkirchner took over his positions as leader of the SED parliamentary group and vice-president of the Volkskammer.

In 1990 Käte Niederkirchner undertook a training in Psychotherapy, which for the rest of her career provided a second main pillar to her career as a physician. (She had already been a qualified Paediatrician for twenty years.) At around the same time she self-diagnosed as an ADHD sufferer:

- "Children with an attention deficit - with ADHD and Autism diagnoses - are specially gifted. All the ones who are 'different'. Just like me. That's why we get along together so well. If I hadn’t had ADHD .... I would never have been able to survive those difficult times. ADHD people always come up with something. It's not an illness but a potentiality. You can learn to live with it.
Käte Niederkirchner interviewed by Annett Heide in 2014

On 18 March 1990 the German Democratic Republic held the first (and last) free and fair parliamentary election in the history of the country as a separate state. Käte Niederkirchner again stood as a candidate and was elected as a PDS member of the new parliament, representing the Berlin electoral district. She was elected by colleagues as one of the six vice-presidents of the new parliament (and the only one representing the former SED party). She received more votes from her fellow parliamentarians than any of the other five parliamentary vice-presidents.

By this time it was not just Chancellor Kohl who saw German reunification on the horizon, and acquiring an intensifying momentum of perceived inevitability. Reunification took place, formally, on 3 October 1990, which involved the merging of the parliaments of East and West Germany according to a population based formula. 144 members of the old East German Volkskammer, including 24 from the PDS joined a newly enlarged Bundestag (parliament) based (at this stage) in Bonn. Käte Niederkirchner was not among them.

Instead she pursued and built on her career as a paediatric physician. Directly after reunification she undertook a training in Psychotherapy. In or before 1992 she opened her own specialist clinic for children with ADHD. She had already diagnosed herself with lifelong ADHD.

Towards the end Käte Niederkirchner fell ill with cancer, from which she died in a hospital at Berlin-Lichtenberg on 19 November 2019.
