= Werner Jarowinsky =

East German economist

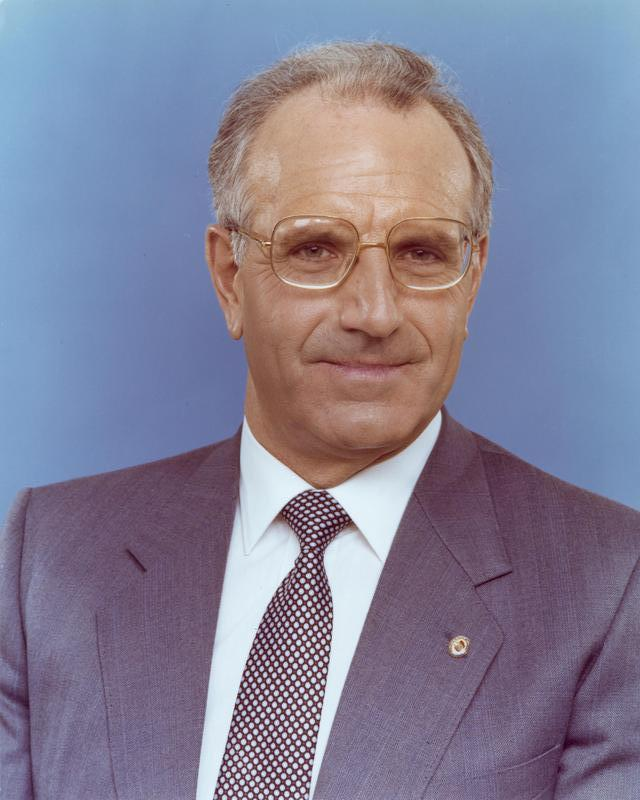
- Jarowinsky in 1983

Deputy President of the Volkskammer
- In office 13 November 1989 – 10 January 1990
- President: Günther Maleuda
- Preceded by: Gerald Götting
- Succeeded by: Käte Niederkirchner

Leader of the Socialist Unity Party in the Volkskammer
- In office 11 November 1989 – 10 January 1990
- General Secretary: Egon Krenz
- Preceded by: Erich Mückenberger
- Succeeded by: Käte Niederkirchner
Volkskammer
Member of the Volkskammer for Suhl-Stadt, Suhl-Land, Ilmenau, Schmalkalden
In office 14 November 1963 – 10 January 1990
Preceded by	multi-member district
Succeeded by	Constituency abolished

Central Committee Secretariat responsibilities
- 1984–1989: Church Affairs
- 1963–1989: Trade, Supply and Foreign Trade (Note: Trade and Supply until 1984.)

Personal details
- Born: Werner Jarowinsky; 25 April 1927 Leningrad, Russian SFSR, Soviet Union (now Saint Petersburg, Russia)
- Died: 22 October 1990 (aged 63) Berlin, Germany
- Party: SED-PDS (1989–1990); Socialist Unity Party (1946–1989); Communist Party of Germany (1945–1946)
- Education: Karl Marx University (Dr. rer. oec.); Humboldt University of Berlin; Martin Luther University Halle-Wittenberg
- Occupation: Politician; Party Functionary; Civil Servant; Economist
- Awards: Order of Karl Marx
- Central institution membership: 1984–1989: Full member, Politburo of the Central Committee; 1963–1984: Candidate member, Politburo of the Central Committee; 1963–1989: Full member, Central Committee; Other offices held: 1961–1963: First Deputy Minister, Ministry for Trade and Supply; 1959–1961: Deputy Minister, Ministry for Trade and Supply

Werner Jarowinsky (25 April 1927 - 22 October 1990) was an East German economist who became a party official. Between 1963 and 1989 he was a member of the powerful Party Central Committee which, under the Leninist constitutional structure that the country had adopted after 1949, was the focus of political power and decision making. Within the Central Committee, from 1984 till 1989, he served as a member of Politburo which controlled and coordinated the work of the Central Committee on behalf of the leadership.

Between 1963 and 1990 Werner Jarowinsky combined his party responsibilities with membership of the People's Parliament (Volkskammer).

== Biography ==
Werner Jarowinsky was born in Leningrad (as Saint Petersburg / Petrograd had been renamed in 1924). His father was a worker of whom little is known, probably originally from Germany. In or shortly after 1930 it appears that his father died and the rest of the family returned to Germany. He completed his schooling in 1941 and then undertook a two-year commercial apprenticeship in industry. Between 1943 and 1945 he undertook his military service in the German army. One result of the end of the war in May 1945 was an end to twelve years of Nazi dictatorship. The Communist Party was no longer banned. Later that year Jarowinsky joined it.

In April 1946 a contentious political merger took place between the Communist Party of Germany and the Social Democratic Party of Germany. The resulting merged party became known as the Socialist Unity Party of Germany ("Sozialistische Einheitspartei Deutschlands" / SED). It has never been entirely clear whether those behind the party merger intended that it should take effect across the whole of Germany: in reality its impact was restricted to the regions administered as the Soviet occupation zone. Backers of the merger pointed to the events of 1933, insisting that the Hitler Adolf Hitler's take-over had been possible only because of divisions between the two main parties of the political left. Werner Jarowinsky was one of more than a million communist party members who lost no time in signing their party membership across to the new SED, which by 1949 had become the dominant political force in a new kind of German one-party dictatorship.

During 1945 and 1946 Jarowinsky was based in Zeitz (south of Leipzig) as a "Youth official" ("Jugendfunktionär"). He was also employed during this period by the People's Police, though it is not clear from sources whether he was a "member" of the police or working as an administrative support official. At the same time, from 1945 till 1947, he was able to study with the "Workers' and Peasants' Faculty" attached to Halle University in order to complete his hitherto truncated schooling. Werner Jarowinsky passed his School Final Examinations (Abitur) in 1947, which opened the way to university-level education.

He studied Economics and Jurisprudence at the universities of Halle and Berlin between 1948 and 1951. During that time, in October 1949, the Soviet occupation zone was relaunched as the Soviet sponsored German Democratic Republic (East Germany). It was in this new version of Germany that Werner Jarowinsky now pursued his studies and built his career. He remained at Berlin with a junior teaching position (als "Dozent") between 1951 and 1956. However, when in June 1956 he received his doctorate, it came from the Karl Marx University (as it had been rebranded and relaunched in 1953) in Leipzig. His dissertation concerned the "Functions of Planning of Socialist Trade in the German Democratic Republic and the underlying principals for the state planning of frontline merchandising". (Note: "Die Funktionen der Planung des sozialistischen Handels der Deutschen Demokratischen Republik und die Grundlagen der staatlichen Einzelhandelsumsatzplanung")

In 1956 Jarowinsky was appointed to head up the "Research Institute for Inter-German Trade" ("Forschungsinstituts für den Binnenhandel"), which was part of the Economics faculty at Berlin University. In 1957 he became Head of National Administration ("Leiter der Hauptverwaltung") at the East German Ministry for Trade and Supplies ("Ministerium für Handel und Versorgung"), which had connections to the university institute. Further promotion followed in 1959 when he became "Deputy Minister" or "Secretary of State" (sources differ over the job title) In succession to Franz Fillinger. Jarowinsky remained in office at the ministry till 1963.

The Sixth Party Conference of the SED was held in East Berlin during the third week in January 1963. Werner Jarowinsky was among those elected to membership of the Party Central Committee. It was quite usual for Central Committee members to join only after their names had been on the list of candidates for membership during a period of several years. Indeed, the names of many candidates never progressed beyond the candidates' list. There is no indication in the sources consulted that Jarowinsky's admission to Central Committee membership was delayed in this way. However, at that same Sixth Party Conference his name was placed on the (much shorter) list of candidates for future promotion to Politburo membership.

Within the Central Committee, on 1 November 1963, Jarowinsky was elected to a secretaryship with responsibility for Trade and Supplies. Later "Church Questions" were added to his portfolio of central committee responsibilities. In May 1984 he finally joined the Politburo, serving as a member till December 1989. Between September 1963 and 1990 Jarowinsky also sat as a member of the People's Parliament (Volkskammer). Care had been taken to ensure a semblance of multi-party plurality in the People's parliament, but Jarowinsky is listed throughout as a member representing the ruling SED (party) itself. Between 1971 and 1989 he chaired the parliamentary committee for Trade and Supplies.

During the later 1980s, Werner Jarowinsky also became the East German representative on the editorial team producing "Problems of Peace and Socialism", an international academic journal containing jointly-produced content from Communist and workers' parties and published in Prague, albeit with an editor-in-chief from the Soviet Union. His contributions indicate that, in common with the aging membership of the East German politburo more generally, Jarowinsky was not enthusiastic about winds of change arriving in the editorial offices after 1986 from, of all places, Moscow.

In November 1989, the Berlin Wall was breached by large numbers of East German street protestors. To the surprise of commentators (and others) it quickly became apparent that the East German borderguards observing events had received no instructions to intervene. Seeing this, the protestors got sledgehammers and began demolishing the wall. A succession of events now unfolded which led - seemingly inexorably - to East Germany's first and last free election. To Chancellor Kohl of West Germany, who had already had opportunities to discuss the situation with President Gorbachev in some detail, it may already have been apparent that the way was opening up to reunification. For most people that was not yet so obvious. Nevertheless, during November and December 1989 the East German political establishment underwent a terminal loss of collective confidence, while East German citizens cautiously concluded that they were not, after all, about to experience a re-run of 1953. The Party Central Committee and Politburo (including Jarowinsky) resigned en masse on 3 December 1989. That was the context in which, in November 1989, Werner Jarowinsky had become a deputy president of the People's Parliament (Volkskammer). Between 11 November 1989 and 10 January 1990 he also served as leader of the SED parliamentary group in the People's Parliament (Volkskammer).

On 11 January 1990, the withdrawal of Jarowinsky's parliamentary mandate was confirmed. His leadership responsibilities in the Volkskammer were taken over by his party comrade Käte Niederkirchner.

On 21 January 1990, Werner Jarowinsky was excluded from the party, which by this time had rebranded itself as the Party of Democratic Socialism (PDS) and embarked on a desperate scramble to reinvent itself for a more conventionally democratic future.

The process of German reunification was rapid. The free election in East Germany was won by the East German CDU (which acted as the East German wing of the West German party of the same name for that election) specifically because it promised speedy reunification. Although they won the election, they did not win enough seats to govern the Volkskammer. A coalition government with the CDU and several other parties was formed to govern and lead the talks for formal reunification. In September, the reunification treaty was passed by both the Volkskammer in East Berlin and the West German Bundestag in Bonn and it was agreed that the formal reunification would be effective from 3 October. This event happened as planned and merged not only Germany but also East Berlin and West Berlin (until then, an enclave controlled by West Germany) into modern-day Berlin. On 22 October 1990, Werner Jarowinsky died aged 63 in reunified Berlin. He outlived East Germany by only 19 days.

== Awards and honours ==
- 1977 Order of Karl Marx
- 1987 Order of Karl Marx
