= Eva Rohmann =

East German politician

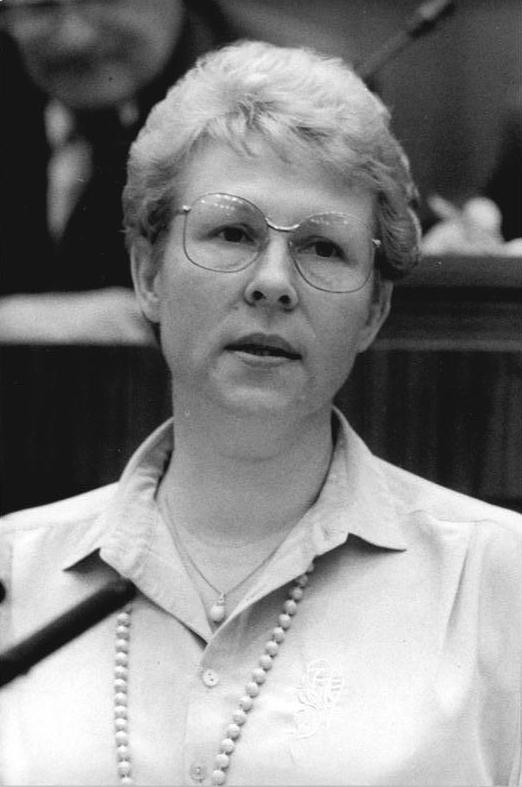
- Rohmann in June 1986

Chairwoman of the Democratic Women's League of Germany
- In office 16 November 1989 – 27 October 1990
- Preceded by: Ilse Thiele
- Succeeded by: Gisela Steineckert

Member of the Volkskammer
- In office 1981–1990
- Parliamentary group: Democratic Women's League of Germany

Personal details
- Born: Eva Hahn; 17 May 1944 Gera, Nazi Germany
- Died: 21 November 2020 (aged 76)
- Party: Democratic Women's League of Germany

Eva Rohmann (née Hahn; 17 May 1944 – 21 November 2020) was a German politician who was chairwoman of the Democratic Women's League of Germany from 1989 until 1990, during the last year of East Germany's existence, and a member of the Volkskammer (1981–1990).

== Biography ==
Eva Hahn, the daughter of a bank clerk, was born on 17 May 1944 in Gera, a city which would later become the capital of the East German Bezirk Gera. After graduating from high school, she studied at the Institut für Lehrerbildung in Gera from 1960 to 1963 and worked as a teacher until 1965. She joined the Free German Trade Union Federation (FDGB) in 1962 and the Socialist Unity Party of Germany (SED) in 1963. In 1964 she joined the Ernst Thälmann Pioneer Organisation Central Committee and from 1965 to 1966 was deputy chair of their Gera-Stadt District Committee. In 1967, she became secretary of the Free German Youth Gera District Committee and head of the Youth and Sport Commission of the SED's Gera-Stadt District Committee, holding the latter position until 1970.

From 1970 to 1973, Rohmann studied at the Parteihochschule Karl Marx, where she obtained a diploma in social sciences. After joining the Democratic Women's League of Germany (DFD) in 1969, she became the head manager of the DFD's national board in 1973. In 1982, she departed from the head manager position and joined the DFD's executive committee and secretariat, remaining in both bodies until 1989. In 1981, Rohmann was elected to the Volkskammer, and in 1984, she became chairwoman of the DFD's parliamentary group. From November 1989 to March 1990 she was a member of the Presidium of the Volkskammer. From 16 November 1989 until 27 October 1990, Rohmann was chairwoman of the DFD.

She remained active in politics even after East Germany's 1990 reunification, participating in the local The Left branch and the Bruchmühle Youth and Cultural Association and serving as the manager of Demokratischer Frauenbund (1990–2000), the DFD's successor organisation. In 1995, she authored a book, Wendezeiten – Zeitenwende.

Rohmann died on 21 November 2020 at the age of 76.
