= Max Opitz =

German communist politician (1890–1982)

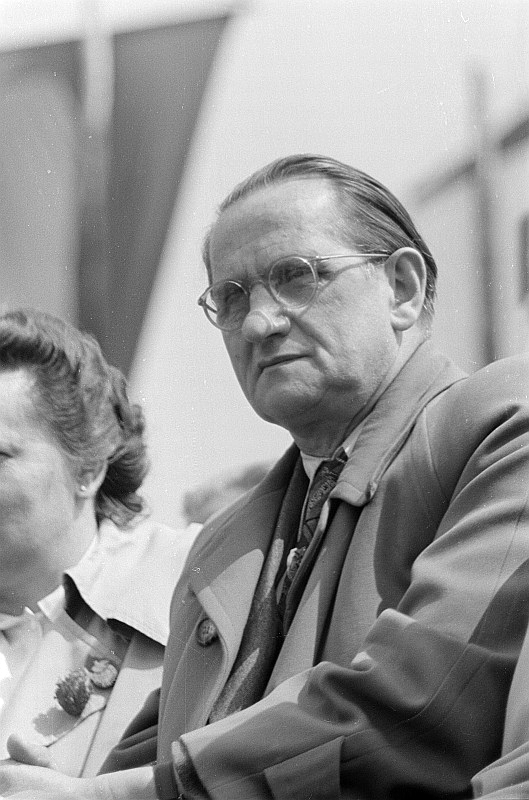
- Opitz in 1951

Mayor of Leipzig
- In office 18 May 1949 – 5 June 1951
- Preceded by: Erich Zeigner
- Succeeded by: Erich Uhlich
Parliamentary constituencies
Member of the Volkskammer for Berlin
In office 15 October 1950 – 20 October 1963
Preceded by	Multi-member district
Succeeded by	Multi-member district
Member of the Reichstag for Westphalia North
In office Not seated
Preceded by	Multi-member district
Succeeded by	Constituency abolished
Member of the Landtag of Prussia for Westphalia North
In office 24 April 1932 – 31 March 1933
Preceded by	Multi-member district
Succeeded by	Constituency abolished
Member of the Landtag of Saxony
In office 25 November 1926 – 30 May 1930
Preceded by	Multi-member district
Succeeded by	Multi-member district

Personal details
- Born: September 11, 1890 Bernsdorf, Kingdom of Saxony, German Empire
- Died: January 7, 1982 (aged 91) East Berlin, East Germany
- Resting place: Zentralfriedhof Friedrichsfelde
- Party: KPD (1919–1946); SED (after 1946)
- Spouse(s): Ida Helene Fischer; Erna Baldauf; Ella Keller
- Awards: Patriotic Order of Merit, honour clasp (1975); Patriotic Order of Merit, in gold (1970 & 1965); Order of Karl Marx (1960); Patriotic Order of Merit, in silver (1959 & 1954); Medal for Fighters Against Fascism (1958); Medal of Honor of the Volkspolizei (1955)

Military service
- Allegiance: German Empire
- Branch/service: Imperial German Army
- Years of service: 1911–1913; 1914–1918
- Unit: Uhlan Regiment No. 21
- Battles/wars: World War I (WIA)
- Central institution membership: 1929: Candidate member, KPD Central Committee; Other offices held: 1945–1949: Chief, Dresden Police; 1933: Political Leader, Württemberg KPD; 1932–1933: Political Leader, Ruhr KPD; 1931–1932: Political Leader, Hesse-Frankfurt KPD; 1931: Political Leader, Lower Rhine KPD; 1928–1931: Political Leader, Erzgebirge-Vogtland KPD; 1927–1928: Organizational Leader, Erzgebirge-Vogtland KPD

Max Ernst Opitz (September 11, 1890 – January 7, 1982) was a German communist politician and functionary who served in several legislative positions in the Weimar Republic and East Germany between 1926 and 1963. In the latter state, he also served as mayor of Leipzig from 1949 to 1951.

== Life ==
Opitz was born on September 11, 1890, in Bernsdorf, Zwickau, the son of a miner. After attending elementary school, he completed an apprenticeship as a carpenter from 1905 to 1908. In 1911 he was drafted into military service, served seven years in the Uhlan Regiment No. 21. He was wounded several times in the First World War. In 1915 he married for the first time. During the German Revolution, he was elected to his regiment's soldiers' council. After his discharge from the army, he became a founding member of the Communist Party of Germany (KPD) in 1919. In 1920 he moved to Chemnitz.

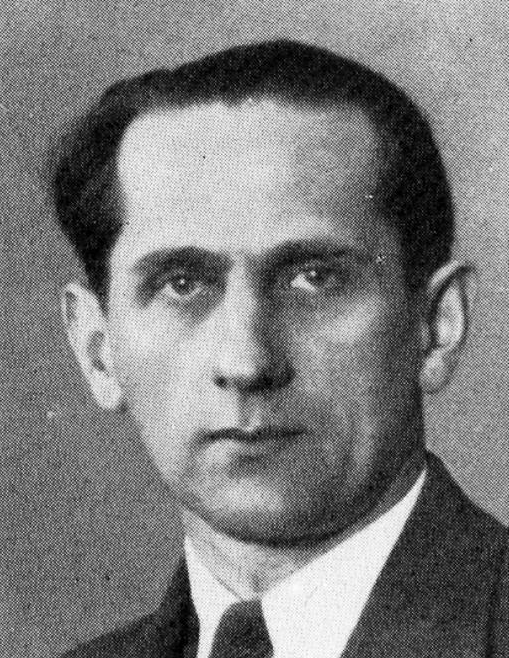
Opitz's official Landtag portrait, 1932

From 1923, Opitz held a succession of regional leadership roles in the KPD. From 1926 to 1930 he was a member of the Landtag of the Free State of Saxony. In 1932, Opitz was elected to the Landtag of Prussia, where he would remain until the Nazi Party seized power in 1933.

On February 7, 1933, Opitz took part in an illegal meeting of the Central Committee of the KPD in the Sporthaus Ziegenhals in Berlin. On March 5, 1933, he was elected to the Reichstag, but like all KPD representatives he was unable to exercise his mandate due to the Nazi ban on the KPD. Opitz then took part in anti-Nazi resistance activities in Dortmund and Stuttgart. On November 2, 1933, he was arrested in Stuttgart and sentenced to three years and one month in prison in 1934 for "preparing to commit high treason". In November 1937, he was put on trial for alleged involvement in the shooting of a police officer. He was initially sentenced to four years in prison for manslaughter, but his conviction was overturned on appeal. In 1938, Opitz was again put on trial for treason, and subsequently sentenced to four years in prison. He served both of his sentences in the Ludwigsburg Prison. After serving his prison sentence, he was transferred to Sachsenhausen concentration camp by the Gestapo in October 1941. On May 1, 1945, he was liberated by the Red Army near Flecken Zechlin.

After the conclusion of the Second World War, Opitz returned to Saxony. From July 1945 to April 1949 he was police chief in Dresden. In 1946, he joined the Socialist Unity Party (SED). After the death of Erich Zeigner, Opitz became mayor of Leipzig from May 18, 1949, to June 5, 1951. In 1950 he was elected to the Volkskammer, where he would remain until 1963. After his retirement he worked in the leadership of the Committee of Antifascist Resistance Fighters.

== Awards ==
- 1975 Patriotic Order of Merit, honour clasp
- 1970 & 1965 Patriotic Order of Merit, in gold
- 1960 Order of Karl Marx
- 1959 & 1954 Patriotic Order of Merit, in silver
- 1958 Medal for Fighters Against Fascism
- 1955 Medal of Honor of the Volkspolizei
