= August Bach =

East German politician

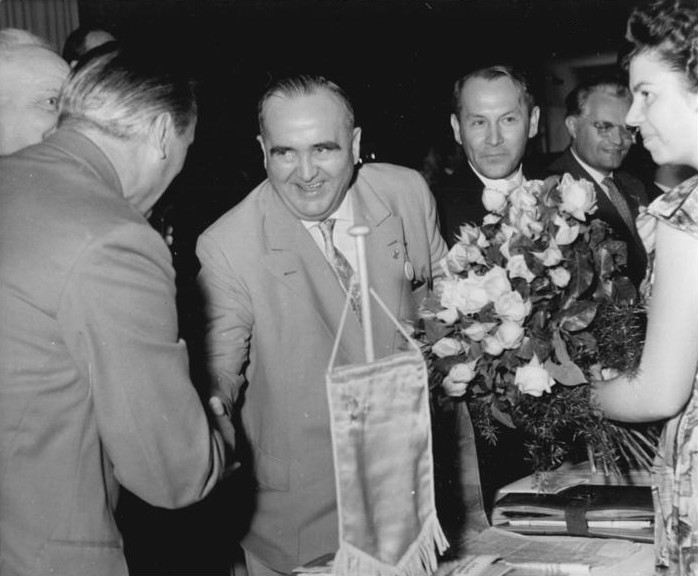
- Bach in 1960

Chairman of the Christian Democratic Union
- In office 1958–1966
- Preceded by: Otto Nuschke
- Succeeded by: Gerald Götting

President of the Länderkammer
- In office 5 March 1955 – 8 December 1958
- Preceded by: Reinhold Lobedanz
- Succeeded by: Office abolished

Member of the Volkskammer
- In office 1949–1966

Member of the Landtag of Thuringia
- In office 1950–1952

Personal details
- Born: 30 August 1897 Rheydt, German Empire
- Died: 23 March 1966 (aged 68) East Berlin, German Democratic Republic
- Party: Christian Democratic Union (East Germany) (1945-)
- Education: University of Berlin
- Profession: Journalist

Military service
- Allegiance: German Empire
- Years of service: 1916-1918
- Battles/wars: First World War

August Bach (30 August 1897 – 23 March 1966) was a German politician who led the Christian Democratic Union in East Germany from 1958 to 1966.

August Bach was born in Rheydt. From 1915 to 1918 he served in German army. After the War he studied History at the University of Berlin. He worked as a journalist during the Weimar Republic and he was a member of the liberal German Democratic Party. From 1922 to 1944 he was the editor of the Berliner Monatshefte.

After World War II, Bach was the co-founder of East German Christian Democratic Union in Thüringen and was elected in the provincial executive of the CDUD of Thüringen. In 1947 he joined the Society for German-Soviet Russian Friendship (DSF) and he served as the vice-chairman of the DSF-Thüringen (1949). Later he was a member of the Presidium of the DSF.

From May 1950 Bach was the editor of the Thüringen Daily and member of the CDU Executive Commission and the CDU Political Commission. From 1955 to 1958 he served as chairman of the Länderkammer (the upper house of Parliament). A loyal supporter of the Communist SED regime, he helped push out those CDU members not willing to do the Communists' bidding, and led its formal transformation into a loyal partner of the SED in 1952.

After the death of Otto Nuschke, Bach was elected Chairman of the CDUD (as it was now known) in 1958. From 1958 to 1963 he was vice-president of the Volkskammer and from 1963 to his death he served as member of the Presidium of the Volkskammer.

== See also ==
- German Democratic Republic
- Christian Democratic Union (East Germany)
