= Grete Groh-Kummerlöw =

German politician (1909–1980)

- Born: Margarete Gertrud "Grete" Groh; 6 February 1909; Plauen, Kingdom of Saxony, German Empire
- Died: 16 February 1980 (aged 71); Karl-Marx-Stadt (Chemnitz), Bezirk Karl-Marx-Stadt, East Germany
- Occupation: Politician
- Political party: KPD; SED
- Spouse: Heinrich Kummerlöw
- Children: Fritz Kummerlöw

Grete Groh-Kummerlöw (6 February 1909 – 16 February 1980) was a German politician.

During the Weimar period she was elected a Communist Party member in the regional legislative assembly of Saxony in 1930, thereby becoming the youngest legislative assembly member in Germany.

For the twelve Nazi years she engaged in political resistance, spending much of the period in state detention.

Under Germany's second one-party dictatorship she served for many years as a deputy president in the Presidium of the People's Chamber where she represented the country's Trades Union Federation.

== Life ==
=== Early years ===
Grete Groh was born into a working-class family in Plauen, a small town in western Saxony where the local economy boomed and slumped according to the state of the textiles industry which had fueled Plauen's rapid growth during the previous century. Grete was the seventh of her parents' nine recorded children. From an early age she supported the family by helping her mother with the housework.

Aged 15 she left school and took a job in a textiles factory. The next year she joined the German Textiles Workers' Trades Union, which stood out among the major trades unions of the times on account of the high proportion of women in its membership. She joined the Young Communists in 1927, participating in administrative and leadership work. She briefly relocated to Berlin, possibly in connection with her political activities, but soon returned to her native Saxony. On reaching the age of 21 lost no time in joining the Communist Party itself in 1930.

=== Politics ===
1930 was a year of regional elections. In Saxony Grete Groh was included on the Communist Party list. Despite increasing their share of the vote the Communists still came in only a close third in Saxony, behind the SPD and the NSDAP. Nevertheless, the vote shares still entitled the Communists to 13 seats in the new Landtag (regional legislative assembly) and Grete Groh's name was high enough up the party list to for her to win one of those seats. She was at this stage the youngest member not merely in the Saxony Landtag, but in any of the regional legislative assemblies across Germany.

One source states that Groh was a textile worker from 1925 till 1932 while other, possibly more left-wing sources, state that she was a textile worker from 1932 till 1945. Either way, it appears from the sources that after 1931 her party and political work took up more of her time and energy. 1931 was the year in which she became an organising director and instructor for the regional leaderships of the Young Communists in both Dresden and Leipzig.

=== Regime change, marriage and war ===
Regime change came to Germany in January 1933 and the new government lost little time in imposing one-party government. Political party membership or work - other than for the Nazi Party - was banned. Grete Groh nevertheless continued with her party work. She was probably briefly detained by the authorities in February 1933. Then, on 28 June 1933 she was arrested at Bitterfeld and placed in "protective custody". Almost a year later, on 8 June 1934, she was convicted at the high court in Dresden of "Conspiracy to commit High Treason" and sentenced to twenty months in prison. She spent her sentence at the Waldheim super-jail, and was in the event released in November 1935. She was then placed under police surveillance. On leaving prison she was initially unemployed, but later found farm work. Towards the end of 1936 she returned to work in the Plauen textile industry.

In 1937 she married Heinrich Kummerlöw. Their son Fritz was born in 1940, after which the focus of her work was on her family for the next three years. However, after 1943 she again became closely connected with the (still illegal) Communist Party. Through Kurt Sindermann she came into contact with the resistance group around Anton Saefkow. In the wake of the assassination plot of 20 July 1944 against The Leader, there was a rash of political arrests which included 280 members of the Safkow resistance group. On 10 August 1944 Grete Groh-Kummerlöw was again arrested, again facing a charge of "Conspiracy to commit High Treason". She was sent to Potsdam on 9 February 1945 where she was scheduled to face trial in the People's Court which the government had created specially for political trials. However, by now Germany had been at war for more than four years, and military defeat would follow in May 1945. In the chaos of the period, Groh-Kummerlöw's planned trial never took place: on 27 April 1945 she was released from prison by the advancing Red army, by this time already fighting for control of nearby Berlin.

=== Soviet occupation zone ===
At the end of the war both her home region of Saxony and Potsdam, where she had been liberated by Soviet soldiers, found themselves in the Soviet occupation zone of what had previously been Germany. Grete Groh-Kummerlöw's first job involved working in Potsdam for the Soviet commander as the occupiers established an administration structure, but in August 1945 she returned to the Plauen area and immediately resumed her trades union activities. She worked as a secretary for the Plauen Party Leadership, taking on responsibility for training communist cells and extending trades union influence in the factories. In January 1946, as a member of the executive of the regional executive of the important Textile Workers' Union, she was mandated to take on the chair of the Third Trades Union Congress Executive for Saxony. Although individual trades unions continued to exist in the Soviet occupation zone, the highly centralised power structure being developed for the zone meant that union power was heavily centralised in the Trades Union Congress (FDGB / Freier Deutscher Gewerkschaftsbund). This meant that from now on Groh-Kummerlöw's position within the FDGB would form the basis for a 25-year career in national politics. In February 1946, in addition to her existing duties, she became a member of the FDGB National Executive, a membership which she retained till 1963. She was particularly active in the Women's Committee of the National Executive Committee, promoting increased inclusion of women both in the country's paid work force and in trades union organisations.

=== German Democratic Republic ===
In April 1946 the way was prepared for a return to one-party dictatorship with the contentious merger, in the Soviet zone, of the Communist Party (KPD) and the more moderately left-wing Social Democratic Party (SPD). Grete Groh-Kummerlöw was one of many thousands of Communist Party members who lost little time in signing their party membership across to the new Socialist Unity Party (SED). By the time the occupation zone was re-founded, in October 1949, as the Soviet sponsored German Democratic Republic, the SED was in place, ready to become the new country's ruling political party, while the systematic removal from positions of party influence of former SPD members meant that in respect of party structure and policies it resembled the old pro-Soviet Communist Party with a new name. 1949 was also the year in which, in May, Grete Groh-Kummerlöw relocated from Saxony to Berlin. She took a position as head of the Social Policy Department on the National Executive of the Trades Union Congress (FDGB). From now on her union and political career would become a national one. In 1950 her marriage ended in divorce.

The FDGB was closely integrated into the country's power structure, and after the 3rd FDGB Congress, which took place in 1950, Groh-Kummerlöw became responsible for the organisation's Worker Supply Department. The issue of worker supply was important nationally in the context of a desperate shortage of workers, following the large-scale slaughter of the war and the continuing haemorrhage of working age citizens across the still relatively porous border to West Germany. For the Trades Union organisation improvements in social policy were central to the Worker Supply Department. In 1952 the departments at the FDGB were reconfigured and she also took over from Adolf Deter responsibility for Social Security matters. In 1957 Groh-Kummerlöw switched, becoming Secretary of the Central Committee for Industrial Unions in the local economy, before further promotion in 1958 which was when she became Secretary of the FDGB group in the national People's Chamber.

Grete Groh-Kummerlöw took part in the KPD/SPD Party Congresses that voted through the merger of the parties in April 1946, and became a member of the reconstituted Landtag (regional legislative assembly) for Saxony, where she was one of 59 members (in a 120 seat assembly) representing the new Socialist Unity Party (SED). She was also a member of the Party Presidium in the regional assembly. However, she resigned in December 1949 from the Saxony assembly, responding to the call of national politics. She had already relocated to Berlin seven months earlier. By this time she had also already found time for a period of study at the regional party academy in Ottendorf.

The move to Berlin marked the start of her time as a member of the "People's Council", which a few months after she joined it became the People's Chamber (Volkskammer / National Legislative Assembly). The legislature was controlled by the ruling SED (party) not because all the other political parties had been banned, but because a structure had been constructed that enabled SED party to specify the other parties' (fixed) quotas of seats and, increasingly, to control what they did. In addition to these so-called Bloc parties, certain approved Mass Organisations also received quotas of seats in the Volkskammer. East Germany's constitutional arrangements closely followed those of the Soviet Union, which had been devised by Lenin. The presence of mass movements in the legislature was intended to indicate a broadening of popular support for the legislative programme of the ruling party, and it diluted the presence of other political parties which, especially in the early 1950s, were not always quite as firmly under the control of the SED power structure as they later became. One of the Mass Organisations represented in the Volkskammer was the Trades Union Congress (FDGB / Freier Deutscher Gewerkschaftsbund). For the 1949 legislative period the FDGB's had a quota of 30 seats in the 330 seat Volkskammer. Grete Groh-Kummerlöw occupied one of the FDGB seats. Both the FDGB quota and the total number of seats would increase during the next 25 years, but Groh-Kummerlöw continued to represent the FDGB in the chamber until 1971. Within the FDGB group, she played a leading role and, in respect of the overall assembly, she also served as a member of the Presidium of the People's Chamber from 1950 till 1971 and as of its deputy presidents from 1950 till 1963.

In 1967 Grete Groh-Kummerlöw, now aged 58, resigned from her various political and trades union functions on health grounds. An exception was the People's Chamber where she continued to represent the FDGB and to be listed as a Presidium member till 1971.

== Awards and honours ==
- 1954 Clara Zetkin Medal
- 1955 Patriotic Order of Merit in Bronze
- 1959 Patriotic Order of Merit in Silver
- 1959 Medal for Merit
- 1965 Banner of Labor
- 1975 Patriotic Order of Merit in Gold
- 1979 Order of Karl Marx
