= Bernsdorf, Zwickau =

Bernsdorf
- Municipality
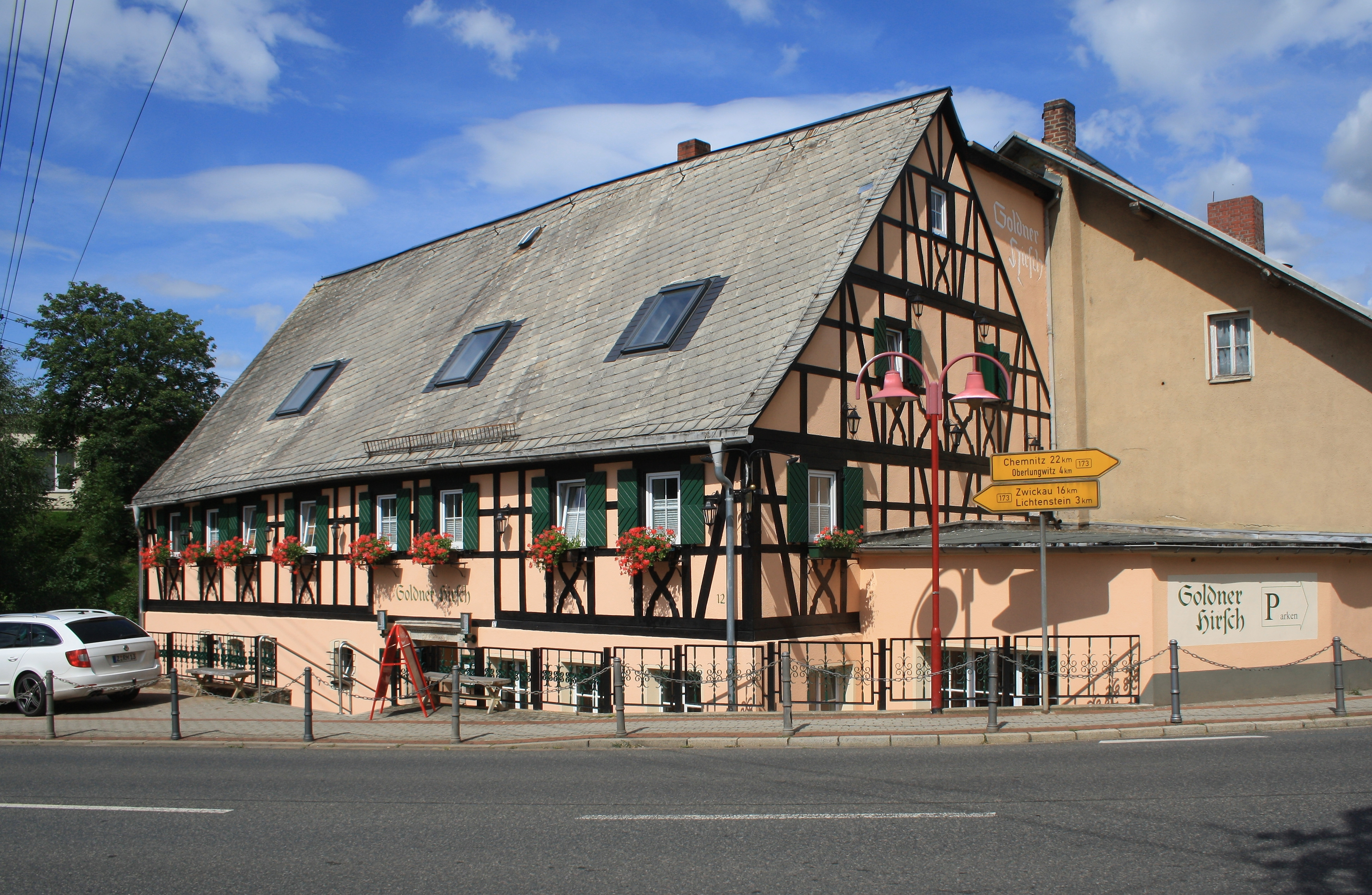
- Half-timbered house (fachwerkhaus) in Bernsdorf

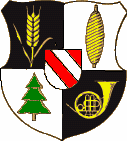
- Coat of arms

- Location of Bernsdorf within Zwickau district
- Interactive map of Bernsdorf
- Location within Germany Location within Saxony
- Coordinates: 50°46′N 12°40′E
- Country: Germany
- State: Saxony
- District: Zwickau
- Subdivisions: 3

Government
  - Mayor (2019–26): Roswitha Müller (FDP)

Area
  - Total: 14.82 km^{2} (5.72 sq mi)
- Elevation: 300 m (980 ft)

Population (2025-12-31)
  - Total: 2,078
  - Density: 140.2/km^{2} (363.2/sq mi)
- Time zone: UTC+01:00 (CET)
  - Summer (DST): UTC+02:00 (CEST)
- Postal codes: 09337
- Dialling codes: 037204, 03723
- Vehicle registration: Z
- Website: www.bernsdorf-erzgebirge.de

Bernsdorf (German pronunciation: [ˈbɛʁnsˌdɔʁf]) is a municipality in the district of Zwickau in Saxony in Germany. Bernsdorf is part of the Municipal association Rund um den Auersberg. The population as of 2007 was 2,505.

== Notable people ==
- Max Opitz (1890-1982), 1949-1951 Lord Mayor of Leipzig
- Gerhard Thieme (born 1928), sculptor
- Volker Bigl (1942-2005), physician and brain researcher,
- Gottfried Klimbt (born 1943), athlete
