= Heinrich Homann =

German politician (1911–1994)

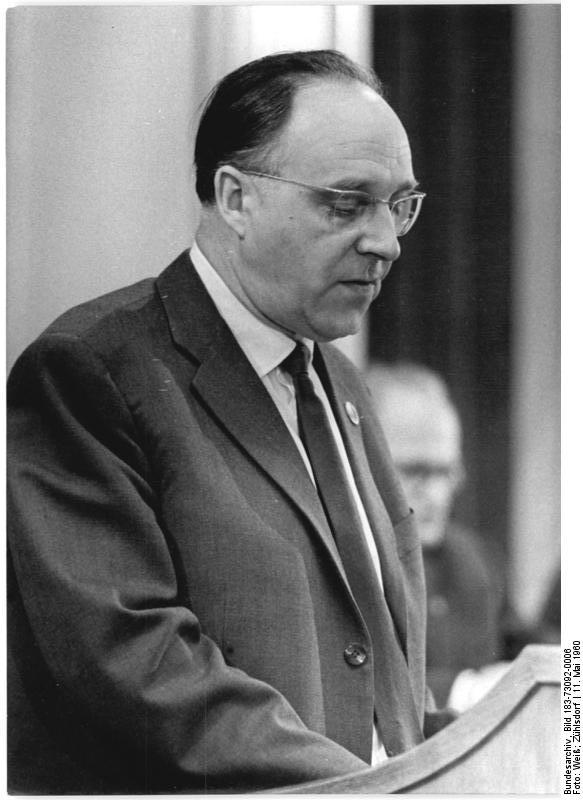
- Homann in 1960

Chairman of the National Democratic Party of Germany
- In office 1972 – December 1989
- Preceded by: Lothar Bolz
- Succeeded by: Günter Hartmann

Deputy Chairman of the State Council
- In office 12 September 1960 – 17 November 1989

Vice President of the Presidium of the People's Chamber
- In office 1950–1952

Member of the Volkskammer
- In office 1949–1990

Personal details
- Born: 6 March 1911 Bremerhaven, German Empire
- Died: 4 May 1994 (aged 83) Berlin, Germany
- Party: NSDAP; NDPD
- Education: University of Tübingen; University of Jena; University of Göttingen; University of Hamburg
- Occupation: Politician

Military service
- Allegiance: Nazi Germany (until 1943); East Germany (from 1949)
- Branch/service: Heer
- Years of service: 1934–1943
- Rank: Major
- Conflict: World War II: Battle of Stalingrad

Heinrich Homann (6 March 1911 – 4 May 1994) was a German communist politician and former Wehrmacht officer who held a number of offices in the German Democratic Republic.

== Biography ==
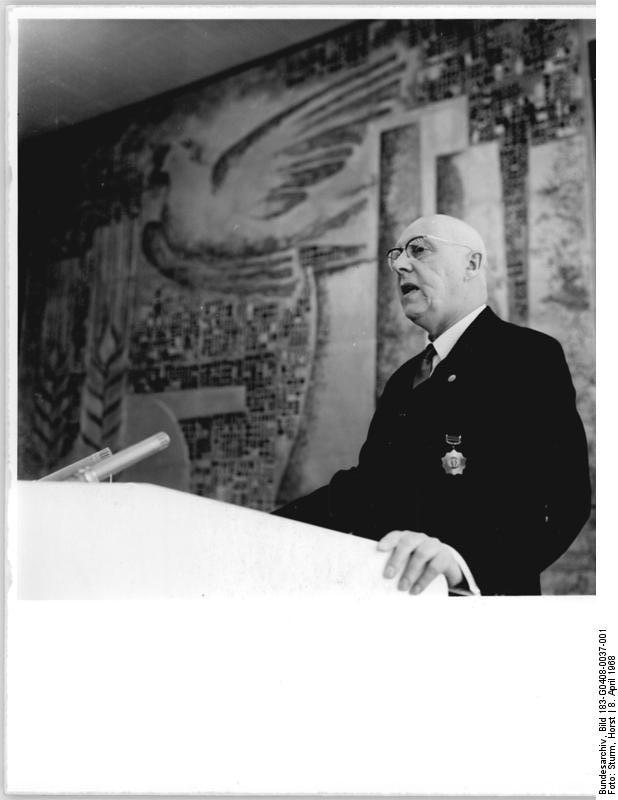
Homann speaking to the State Council in 1968

Heinrich Homann was born on 6 March 1911, the son of a shipping company director in Bremerhaven. He studied law at the universities of Tübingen, Jena, Göttingen, and Hamburg. In 1933, he joined the Nazi Party, and the following year entered the military. He eventually rose to the rank of Major in the Heer and fought on the Eastern Front in World War II. In 1943, he was taken prisoner by the Soviets at the Battle of Stalingrad. During his time as a prisoner of war, Homann became a member of the anti-Nazi National Committee for a Free Germany.

After the war, Homann returned to Soviet-occupied Germany and embarked on a political career. He joined the National Democratic Party (NDPD), which largely represented former members of the Nazi Party and helped bind them to the state ideology of the German Democratic Republic. He was first elected to the Volkskammer in 1949, where he served continuously throughout his career. In 1960, he became a Deputy Chairman in the State Council, and in 1972 he succeeded Lothar Bolz as Chairman of the NDPD. Homann's political career ended during the Peaceful Revolution of 1989. He was removed from the State Council in November 1989 and expelled from the NDPD the following month.
