= Friedrich Ebert Jr. =

German politician (1894–1979)

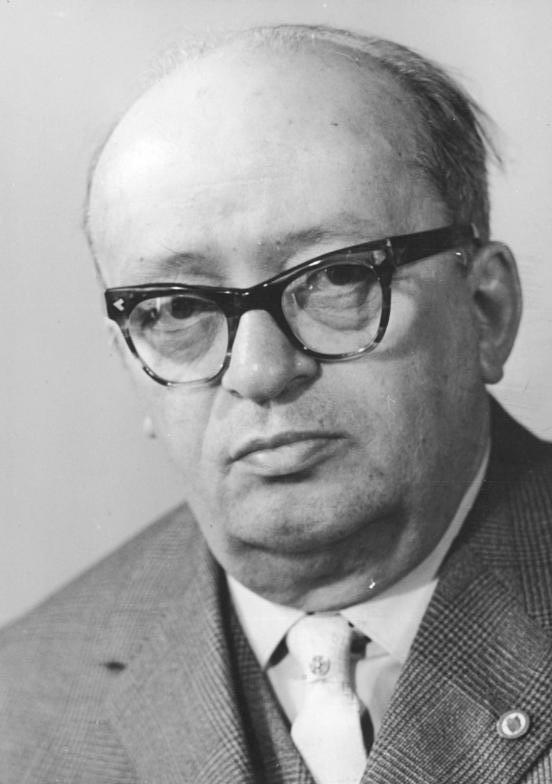
- Ebert in 1961

Chairman of the State Council
- Acting; 1 August 1973 – 3 October 1973
- Preceded by: Walter Ulbricht
- Succeeded by: Willi Stoph

Deputy President of the Volkskammer
- In office June 1971 – 4 December 1979
- President: Gerald Götting; Horst Sindermann
- Preceded by: Hermann Matern
- Succeeded by: Gerald Götting

Secretary for State and Legal Affairs of the Central Committee Secretariat
- In office 19 June 1971 – 4 December 1979
- First Secretary: Walter Ulbricht; Erich Honecker
- Preceded by: Gerhard Grüneberg
- Succeeded by: Paul Verner (1980)

Lord Mayor of East Berlin
- In office 30 November 1948 – 5 July 1967
- Deputy: Arnold Gohr; Alfred Neumann; Waldemar Schmidt; Johanna Blecha; Herbert Fechner
- Preceded by: Louise Schroeder (acting)
- Succeeded by: Herbert Fechner

First Secretary of the Socialist Unity Party in Brandenburg
- In office 21 April 1946 – 4 December 1948 Serving with Willy Sägebrecht
- Preceded by: Position established
- Succeeded by: Paul Bismark
Parliamentary constituencies
Member of the Volkskammer
In office 18 March 1948 – 4 December 1979
Preceded by	Constituency established
Succeeded by	Günther Skrzypek (1980)
Member of the Reichstag for Potsdam I
In office 13 June 1928 – 22 June 1933
Preceded by	Multi-member district
Succeeded by	Constituency abolished

Personal details
- Born: 12 September 1894 Bremen, Free Hanseatic City of Bremen, German Empire (now Germany)
- Died: 4 December 1979 (aged 85) East Berlin, East Germany
- Resting place: Zentralfriedhof Friedrichsfelde, Berlin, Germany
- Citizenship: East German
- Party: SPD (1913–1946); SED (1946–1979)
- Spouse: Johanna Elisabeth Vollmann (m. 1920; died 1938)
- Children: Friedrich III; Georg
- Parents: Friedrich Ebert (father); Louise Ebert (mother)
- Occupation: Politician; Printer; Journalist

Military service
- Allegiance: German Empire; Nazi Germany
- Branch/service: Imperial German Army; Wehrmacht
- Years of service: 1914–1918; 1939–1940
- Battles/wars: World War I; World War II
- Central institution membership: 1949–1979: Full member, Politburo of the Central Committee; 1946–1979: Full member, Central Committee (Note: Party Executive Committee until 1950); Other offices held: 1971–1979: Deputy Chairman, State Council; 1960–1979: Member, State Council; 1949–1950: Member, Provisional Chamber of States; 1946–1950: Member, Landtag of Brandenburg; 1933: Member, Prussian State Council; 1927–1933: Member, Brandenburg an der Havel City Council

Friedrich "Fritz" Ebert Jr. (12 September 1894 – 4 December 1979) was a German socialist and later communist politician, the son of Germany's first president Friedrich Ebert. He was originally a Social Democrat like his father before him, but is best known for his role in the foundation of East Germany's ruling party, the Socialist Unity Party of Germany, in which he served in various positions.

== Early life ==
Born in Bremen, Ebert underwent an apprenticeship as a printer from 1909 to 1913. In 1910, he joined the Socialist Workers' Youth and in 1913 the SPD. From 1915 to 1918, he fought in the First World War. Of his three brothers, Ebert Jr. was the only survivor.

== Weimar Republic ==
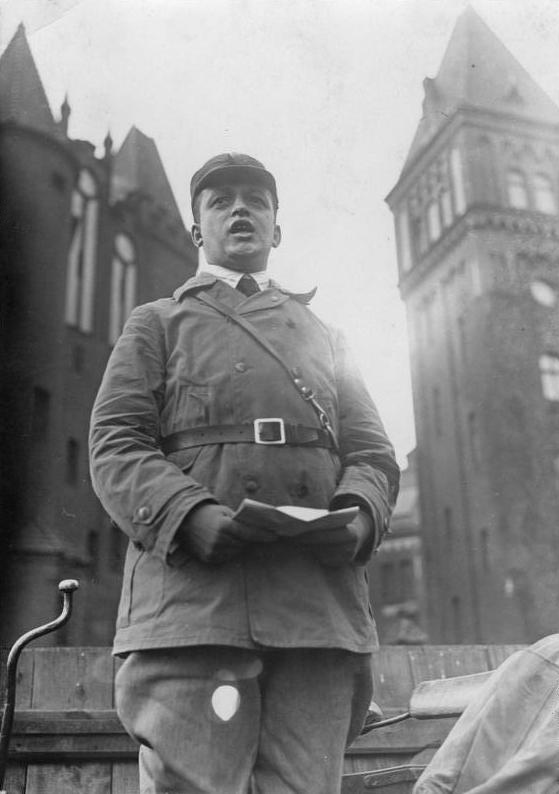
Ebert campaigning, 1928

In 1920, he married Johanna Elisabeth Vollmann, three years his junior, with whom he had two children, Friedrich and Georg. His wife committed suicide in 1938.

During the Weimar Era, Ebert worked for various social democratic newspapers. From 1919 to 1925 he was an editor for Vorwärts, from 1923 to 1925 he worked for the Social Democratic Press Service, and from 1925 to 1933 he was an editor for the Brandenburger Zeitung.

Ebert's career in electoral politics began in 1927 when he was elected to the Brandenburg an der Havel City Council. In 1930, he became City Council Chairman, and the same year he joined the board of the Association of German Cities for the Province of Brandenburg. He was also a member of the SPD district board for Brandenburg-Grenzmark. He was elected to the Reichstag in 1928, representing the Potsdam I constituency, and in April 1933 joined the Prussian State Council representing Brandenburg. He lost all elected positions after the Nazis came to power and banned the SPD in June 1933.

Ebert was also active in the Reichsbanner Schwarz-Rot-Gold, serving as chairman of the Brandenburg state group in 1928.

On 21 February 1933, three weeks after the appointment of Adolf Hitler as Chancellor of Germany, Ebert published an open letter to Paul von Hindenburg. In it he pointed out to the Reich President, among other things,

"...that he had fought and bled for three years under Hindenburg's command. Two of his brothers had fallen in front of Monastir and on the Chemin des Dames. In response to Hitler's claim that fourteen years of Marxism had ruined Germany, Ebert's son recalls the letter that Hindenburg wrote to his father on December 8, 1918, in which he addressed Ebert as a loyal German man with whom he had allied himself to save the people from impending collapse. Finally, Friedrich Ebert asks why nothing was being done to save his father's honor and why his deceased colleagues, Stresemann and Hermann Müller, had also remained defenseless, before whose coffins Hindenburg had bowed his aged head in reverence."

— Article in the Kleine Volks-Zeitung, 22 February 1933

== Nazi Germany ==
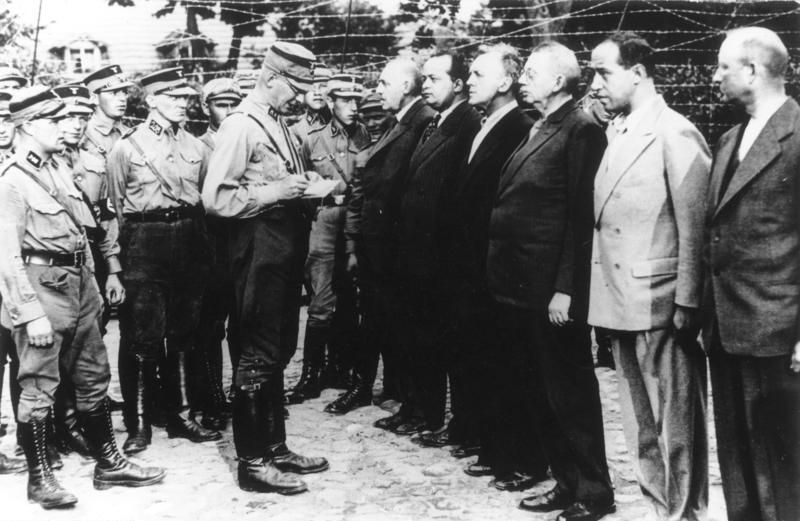
Ebert (fifth from right) with several other political prisoners at Oranienburg concentration camp, 1933

In July 1933, Ebert was arrested for illegal political activity and detained for eight months in various concentration camps, including Oranienburg and Börgermoor. In 1939, he was conscripted into the Wehrmacht, serving for nine months. After he was discharged in 1940, Ebert was forced to work in the packaging and shipping department of the Reich Publishing Office. Until 1945, he was under constant police surveillance.

== East Germany ==
After the demise of the Third Reich, Ebert served as editor-in-chief of Der Märker and was elected chairman of the SPD in the Prussian province of Brandenburg. Being the son of a former president made Ebert one of the foremost political leaders in East Germany. His role in this period can be compared with that of Jan Masaryk in post-war Czechoslovakia. Ebert was courted by the leaders of the Communist Party of Germany (KPD), who were aiming for unification of the much larger SPD with the smaller KPD. They used his father's role in the German Revolution of 1918–19, and the ensuing split in the German socialist movement, to blackmail Ebert into supporting the unification.

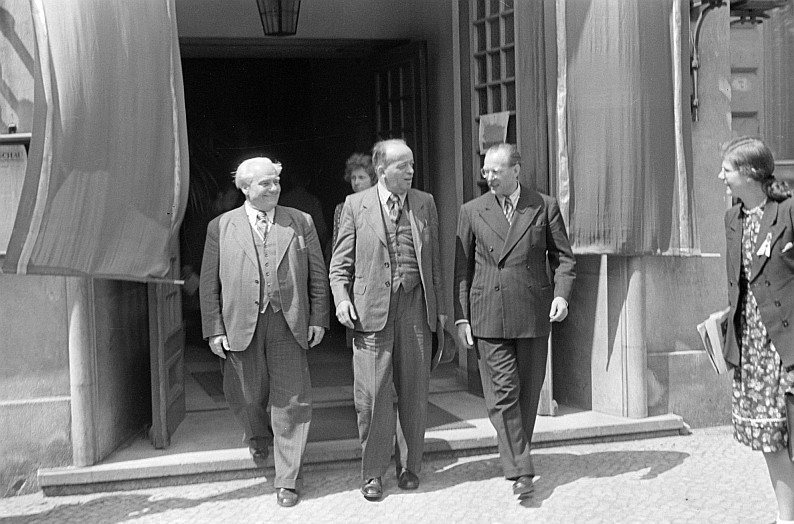
Ebert (middle) alongside Wilhelm Pieck (left) and Otto Grotewohl (right) leaving the 1st Parliament of the Free German Youth in Brandenburg, 1946

In 1946, the unification of the two parties' branches in the Soviet Occupation Zone was carried out under Soviet pressure. After the creation of the new party, the Socialist Unity Party of Germany (SED), Ebert was elected to the Central Committee and from 1949 was also a member of the Politburo. He was one of the few members from the SPD half of the merger with a prominent role in the merged party. The few recalcitrant members of the SPD half were pushed out soon after the merger, leaving the SED as a renamed and enlarged KPD. He served as President of the Landtag of Brandenburg from 1946 to 1949.

After the end of Allied cooperation and the breakup of the administration of Berlin in 1948, Ebert became Lord Mayor of East Berlin; he remained mayor until 1967. During this time he devoted himself to rebuilding the destroyed city, campaigning for the restoration of the Brandenburg Gate, the Rotes Rathaus, the Zeughaus, and the Berlin State Opera.

During the East German flag debate, it was Ebert's suggestion to use the black-red-gold tricolour instead of the black-white-red of the NKFD and the former German Empire. He justified his proposal as follows:

“I am of the opinion that there is no better symbol of German unity, one that is more deeply rooted in German history, than the old imperial colours of black, red and gold. At all times, the fighters for German unity, for a happy future for the country and the people, have gathered around this banner. Its cloth covered the bodies of those who gave their lives for Germany's unity and freedom in the fight against the feudal, despotic monarchy of Prussia. This hour demands that we resume the great tradition of German history and unfurl the banner of German unity over the entire country. In doing so, we will also achieve the revolutionary result of the battles of 1848.”

— Friedrich Ebert Jr., May 1949

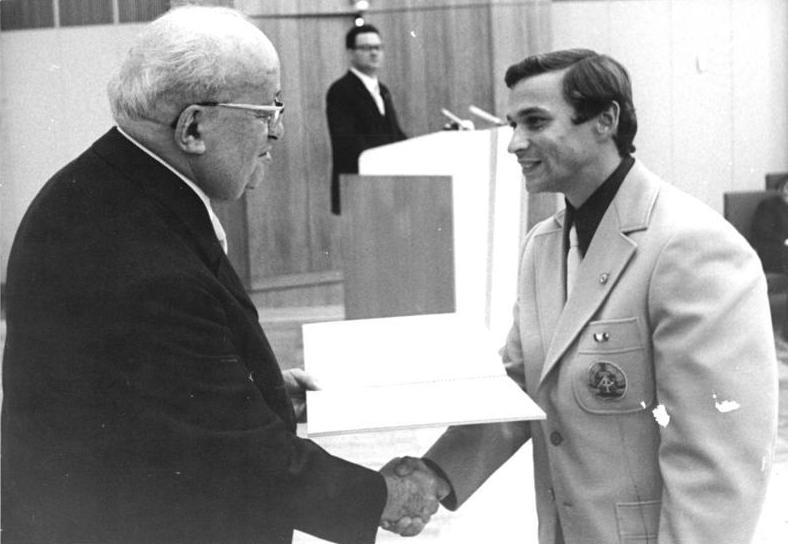
Ebert presenting the Patriotic Order of Merit to Olympic gold medalist Klaus Köste, 1972

He was a member of the Deutscher Volksrat, a preliminary parliament that drew up the first constitution of the GDR, and after 1949, he also became a member of the People's Chamber, the parliament of the GDR. Between 1949 and 1971, Ebert served as the chamber's deputy president. In 1971, he was elected chairman of the SED faction in the People's Chamber. From 1960, he was also a member of the Council of State and from 1971 its deputy chairman. As such, he was acting head of state in 1973 after Walter Ulbricht's death until the election of Willi Stoph.

Ebert lived in Majakowskiring, Pankow, East Berlin. He was decorated with the Order of Karl Marx, the Patriotic Order of Merit, Star of People's Friendship and the Banner of Labor. After his resignation as mayor, the magistrate of East Berlin awarded him honorary citizenship, which was declared null and void in 1992.
