= Johannes Dieckmann =

German politician (1893–1969)

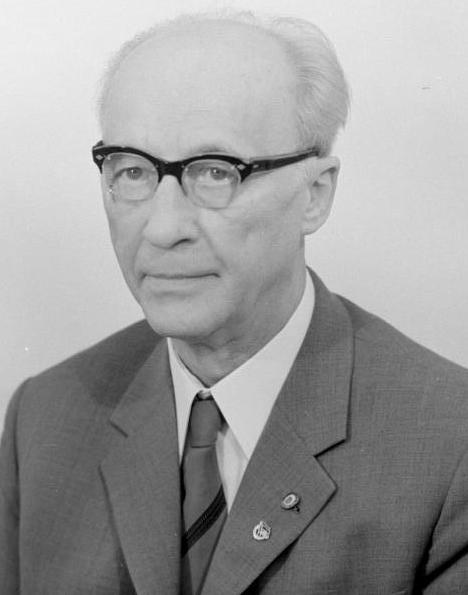
- Dieckmann in 1967

President of the Volkskammer
- In office 7 October 1949 – 22 February 1969
- Preceded by: Office established
- Succeeded by: Gerald Götting

Deputy Chairman of the State Council
- In office 12 September 1960 – 22 February 1969

Acting President of the German Democratic Republic
- In office 7 October 1949 – 11 October 1949
- Preceded by: Office established
- Succeeded by: Wilhelm Pieck
- In office 7 September 1960 – 12 September 1960
- Preceded by: Wilhelm Pieck
- Succeeded by: Office abolished Walter Ulbricht (as Chairman of the State Council)

Personal details
- Born: 19 January 1893 Fischerhude, Hanover, German Empire
- Died: 22 February 1969 (aged 76) East Berlin, East Germany
- Party: Liberal Democratic Party of Germany
- Other political affiliations: German People's Party
- Profession: Politician

Military service
- Allegiance: German Empire; Nazi Germany
- Battles/wars: World War I Battle of France

Johannes Dieckmann (19 January 1893 – 22 February 1969) was a German journalist and politician who served as the 1st President of the Volkskammer, the parliament of East Germany, from 1949 to 1969.

== Biography ==
Dieckmann was born in Fischerhude in the Prussian Province of Hanover, the son of a Protestant pastor. He studied economics and philosophy at the universities of Berlin, where he joined the Verein Deutscher Studenten (VDSt), a German Studentenverbindung, Giessen, Göttingen and Freiburg. In 1916 he was recruited to the German Army and was severely injured in World War I, being declared permanently invalid. Nevertheless, he was later mobilised to the Italian campaign in 1917. During the German Revolution in November 1918, he became chairman of a Soldiers' council.

After the war, he joined the liberal German People's Party (DVP) and became a close associate of Gustav Stresemann in his election campaign. In March 1919, he became a DVP party secretary in constituency Weser-Ems, and in 1921 he was sent by Stresemann to the Duisburg/Oberhausen constituency. During the Belgian occupation in 1922, he was briefly imprisoned for publishing a journal not approved by the occupation authorities. During the Weimar Republic, Dieckmann held various posts within DVP regional leadership and was a member of the Saxon Landtag for DVP from the end of 1929 to February 1933.

After the Nazi seizure of power in January 1933, Dieckmann lost his office and worked from October 5, 1933 to August 30, 1939 in fuel and oilshale companies. From August 1939 to January 1941 he was mobilised again and participated in the French campaign; from January 15, 1941 to 1945 he worked in the Silesian industrial business. After the failed coup attempt against Hitler, when Johannes Dieckmann’s cousin Wilhelm Dieckmann (1893–1944) was executed for connections with the plotters, Johannes Dieckmann was put under cautious surveillance by Gestapo. After the war, Dieckmann established Sächsisches Tageblatt and led Sächsischer Kohlekontor GmbH.

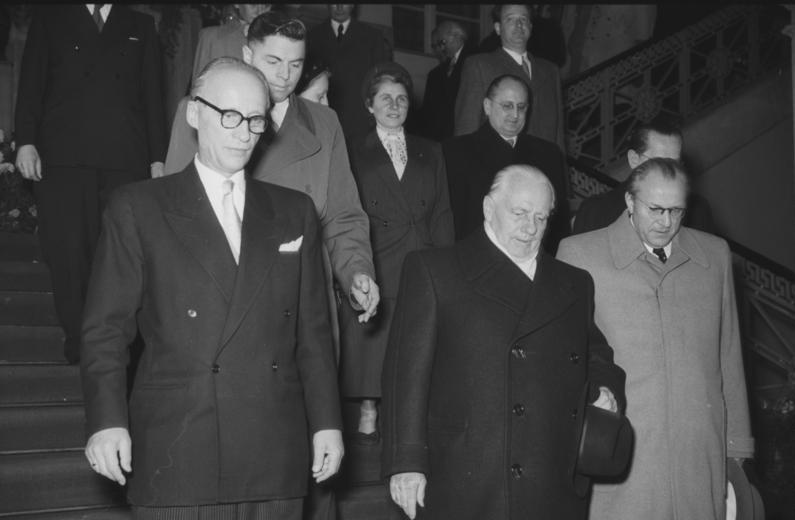
Dieckmann, Wilhelm Pieck, and Otto Grotewohl on the 4th anniversary of the German Democratic Republic, 7 October 1953

In October 1945, he was a co-founder of Kulturbund. In 1945, he with his Bundesbruder Hermann Kastner (1886–1956) were some of the founders of Demokratische Partei Deutschlands (later renamed Liberal-Demokratische Partei Deutschlands); Dieckmann remained member of the party’s central management (Zentralvorstand). From 1946 to 1952 he was a LDPD MP and chairman of the LDPD faction in the Landtag of Saxony and its Präsidium. In that post, he helped push out the more courageous members of his party and led it into the National Front of the GDR, which included official political and social organisations and was effectively controlled by the Socialist Unity Party of Germany.

From 1950 on, Dieckmann was a member of the Präsidium of the National Front.

Later, from 10 March 1948 to 11 December 1949, he was Minister of Justice of the State of Saxony and deputy Ministerpräsident of Saxony. In 1948/49 Dieckmann was a member of the German Economic Commission (German: Deutsche Wirtschaftskommission or DWK), a member of the German People’s Council (Volksrat) and its constitution committee. He also acted as the president (chairman) of the provisional People’s Chamber and the permanent People’s Chamber (Volkskammer), the parliament of the GDR, a post he held until his death.

As such he was acting head of state after president Wilhelm Pieck's death on 7 September 1960, until the presidency was replaced by the State Council five days later. Dieckmann was elected one of the deputy chairmen of the State Council, a post he held until his death.

A member of the Liberal Democratic Party of Germany, one of several parties in the socialist system of East Germany, Dieckmann was already a founding member of the Society for Studying the Culture of the Soviet Union ("Gesellschaft zum Studium der Kultur der Sowjetunion"; from 1949: Gesellschaft für Deutsch-Sowjetische Freundschaft) in 1947. He became one of its leaders and from 1963 to 1968 was the president of the association. He was the Chairman of Permanent Delegation of the GDR for the "International Conference for the Peaceful Solution to the German Question" and Chairman of the "Foundation of Veterans for People’s Solidarity".

== Honour titles and awards ==
- 1954 Patriotic Order of Merit in Gold - first award of this order to 22 people
- 1965 Honorary clasp for the Patriotic Order of Merit in gold
- Ehrendoktor (Honorary doctor) of Leipzig University (1953)
- Honorary Professor
- Banner of Labor
- Ring of Honor of the GDR
- German Peace Medal
- In 1973, the GDR's Deutsche Post issued a special stamp as part of the “Significant Personalities” series for Dieckmann's 80th birthday.
- From 1971 to 1991 there was a Johannes-Dieckmann-Strasse, now Taubenstrasse, in Berlin-Mitte.

Political offices
Preceded by New Position	President of the People's Chamber; 1949–1969	Succeeded by Gerald Götting
