= Horst Sindermann =

German politician (1915–1990)

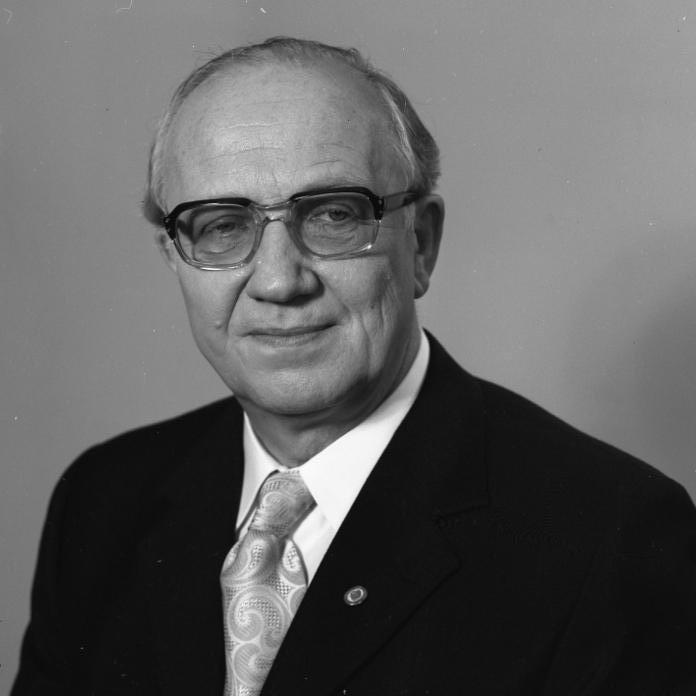
- Sindermann in 1976

President of the Volkskammer
- In office 29 October 1976 – 13 November 1989
- Deputy: Friedrich Ebert Jr.; Gerald Götting
- Preceded by: Gerald Götting
- Succeeded by: Günther Maleuda

Chairman of the Council of Ministers
- In office 3 October 1973 – 29 October 1976
- First Deputy: Günter Mittag; Alfred Neumann
- Preceded by: Willi Stoph
- Succeeded by: Willi Stoph

First Deputy Chairman of the Council of Ministers
- In office 14 May 1971 – 3 October 1973 Serving with Alfred Neumann
- Chairman: Willi Stoph
- Preceded by: Position established
- Succeeded by: Günter Mittag

First Secretary of the Socialist Unity Party in Bezirk Halle
- In office 21 January 1963 – 19 June 1971
- Second Secretary: Gerhard Frost; Werner Felfe
- Preceded by: Bernard Koenen
- Succeeded by: Werner Felfe

Head of the Agitation Department of the Central Committee (Note: As head of the Agitation and Propaganda Department from 1957 to 1961)
- In office 7 April 1954 – 21 January 1963
- Secretary: Fred Oelßner; Albert Norden
- Deputy: Reginald Grimmer; Otto Reinhold; Kurt Tiedke
- Preceded by: Peter Pries
- Succeeded by: Rudolf Singer
Volkskammer
Member of the Volkskammer for Halle/Saale, Halle-Neustadt
In office 20 October 1963 – 16 November 1989
Preceded by	multi-member district
Succeeded by	Joachim Pfeiffer

Personal details
- Born: 5 September 1915 Dresden, Free State of Saxony, German Empire (now Germany)
- Died: 20 April 1990 (aged 74) East Berlin, East Germany
- Party: Socialist Unity Party (1946–1990)
- Other political affiliations: Communist Party of Germany (1945–1946)
- Relatives: Kurt Sindermann (brother)
- Occupation: Politician; Civil Servant
- Central institution membership: 1967–1989: Full member, Politburo of the Central Committee; 1963–1989: Full member, Central Committee; 1958–1963: Candidate member, Central Committee; Other offices held: 1976–1989: Deputy Chairman, State Council; 1976–1989: Member, State Council; 1972–1989: Member, National Defence Council

Horst Sindermann (German pronunciation: [ˈhɔʁst ˈzɪndɐman]; 5 September 1915 – 20 April 1990) was an East German politician. He became Chairman of the Council of Ministers in 1973, but in 1976 he became President of the Volkskammer, the only member of the Socialist Unity Party of Germany to hold the post.

== Early life ==
Sindermann was born in a traditional family in Dresden as the son of the Saxon Social Democratic politician Karl Sindermann. His older brother, Kurt Sindermann, also entered politics as a member of the Communist Party and sat on the Saxon state parliament from 1929 to 1933.

Horst Sindermann joined the Communist Youth Federation (KJVD) in 1929 and in 1932 became a local functionary in Dresden. The group was banned by the Nazi regime and in June 1933, Sindermann was arrested and condemned to eight months of imprisonment for illegal political activities. In September 1934, he became political leader of the KJVD's Dresden branch. In March 1935, he again was arrested for attempted high treason, tortured and put in solitary confinement for six years at Waldheim jail. In 1941, he was transferred to "protective custody" to several concentration camps, first at Sachsenhausen, then at Mauthausen in Upper Austria, and finally at Ebensee, until being freed by the arriving U.S. army in 1945.

== Career in East Germany ==
After the war, Sindermann returned to Saxony and joined the KPD. After 1946 he was a member of the Socialist Unity Party (SED), created in April 1946 from the forced merger of Communists and Social Democrats in the Soviet Occupation Zone.

Sindermann worked as a newspaper editor of the Sächsische Volkszeitung at Dresden and the Volksstimme at Chemnitz from 1945 to 1947. He became First party secretary in the Landkreis of Chemnitz and Leipzig. He ran afoul of party co-chairman Otto Grotewohl, whom he criticised for being married to a former Nazi functionary, and in June 1949 was censured by the party's controlling commission and was demoted to the Freiheit paper in Halle, where he then became editor-in-chief from 1950 to 1953.

Sindermann was director of agitation and propaganda in the Central Committee from 1954 to 1963. In 1958, he became a candidate and in 1963 a member of the Central Committee. In the same year, he also was appointed first party secretary in the district of Halle (until 1971) and was first elected into the Volkskammer. In 1967, he was admitted to the Politburo.

== In the East German leadership ==
In 1971, he became Deputy chairman of the Council of Ministers—i. e., deputy prime minister of East Germany. Two years later, he became its chairman, or prime minister, when the previous occupant, Willi Stoph, succeeded the deceased Walter Ulbricht as Chairman of the State Council.

His rise was cut short in October 1976, as party leader Erich Honecker deemed his economic views too liberal. Stoph returned to the premiership, while Sindermann was demoted to the posts of President of the Volkskammer and deputy chairman of the State Council. He was the only Communist to preside over the Volkskammer; the SED had previously reserved the Volkshammer presidency for a top member of a block party to show that East Germany was governed by a broad-based coalition. Although he nominally held the third-highest state office in East Germany (behind Prime Minister Stoph and State Council chairman Honecker), he was left with little political influence.

As a representative of the Socialist Unity Party, Horst Sindermann spoke during the commemorations of the liberation of the Sachsenhausen concentration camp at the National Memorial of the GDR.

== Resignation and final years ==
Sindermann remained in these positions until the peaceful revolution, during which he resigned from all offices in November 1989. In a desperate attempt to change its image, the Party of Democratic Socialism (PDS), the renamed SED, expelled him in December.

In January 1990 he was arrested but eventually released on health concerns, without charges being filed. He died in April the same year in East Berlin.

== Family ==
His stepson was the actor Peter Sindermann. His grandson is the handball player and fashion designer Eric Sindermann.

== Selected works ==
- Chinas großer Sprung (= Internationale Reihe). Dietz-Verlag, Berlin 1959
- Erfolgreich voran auf dem Kurs des VIII. Parteitages: ausgewählte Reden und Aufsätze. Dietz-Verlag, Berlin 1975
- Frieden und Sozialismus, Staatsdoktrin der DDR. Ausgewählte Reden und Aufsätze. Dietz-Verlag, Berlin 1980
- Alles für das Volk, alles mit dem Volk. Ausgewählte Reden und Aufsätze. Dietz-Verlag, Berlin 1985
- Vor Tageslicht. Autobiografie. Mit einem Vorwort von Egon Krenz. Das Neue Berlin, 2015.

== Bibliography ==
- Helmut Müller-Enbergs, Bernd-Rainer Barth: "Sindermann, Horst". In: Wer war wer in der DDR? 5. Ausgabe. Band 2. Ch. Links, Berlin 2010.
- Hermann Wentker: "Sindermann, Horst Herbert". In: Neue Deutsche Biographie (NDB). Band 24, Duncker & Humblot, Berlin 2010, p. 457 f. (source)
