= 1950 East German general election =

- 15 October 1950

400 out of 466 seats in the Volkskammer
- Turnout: 98.50% (▲3.27pp)
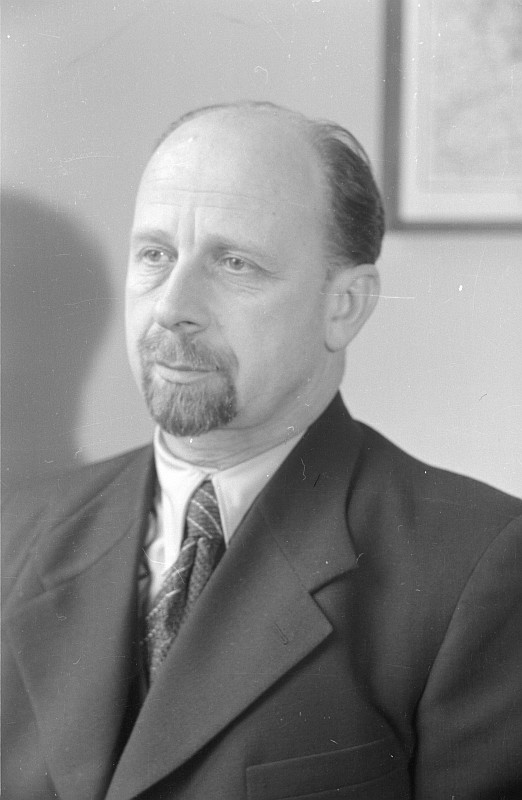
	First party
Leader	Walter Ulbricht
Party	SED
Alliance	National Front
Seats won	110
Chairman of the Council of Ministers before election
Otto Grotewohl
SED
Chairman of the Council of Ministers after election
Otto Grotewohl
SED

General elections were held in East Germany on 15 October 1950. They were the first held since the founding of the country on 7 October 1949. There were 466 deputies in the Volkskammer, including 66 from East Berlin who were not directly elected.

The 66 East Berlin deputies appointed by the city government included 6 deputies listed as SPD members, which was active in East Berlin despite the forced merger of the SPD and KPD in the Soviet occupation zone due to the four-power status of Berlin. These 6 members were part of the so-called Social Democratic Action (SDA). The SDA described itself as an intra-party opposition group within the SPD, but in actuality, it was a legally separate communist front organization loyal to the SED.

This election set the tone for all elections held in East Germany until the Peaceful Revolution. Voters were presented with a single list from the National Front of Democratic Germany, which in turn was controlled by the Socialist Unity Party. Only one candidate appeared on the ballot; voters simply took the ballot paper and dropped it into the ballot box. Those who wanted to vote against the candidate had to go to a special booth, without any secrecy. Seats were apportioned based on a set quota, not actual vote totals. By ensuring that its candidates dominated the list, the SED effectively predetermined the composition of the Volkskammer.

According to official figures, the National Front list received the approval of 99.6% of voters, with turnout reported to be 98.5%.

== Results ==
Party or alliance		Votes	%	Seats
National Front	Socialist Unity Party of Germany	12,088,745	99.71	110
National Front	Christian Democratic Union	12,088,745	99.71	67
National Front	Liberal Democratic Party of Germany	12,088,745	99.71	66
National Front	Free German Trade Union Federation	12,088,745	99.71	49
National Front	National Democratic Party of Germany	12,088,745	99.71	35
National Front	Democratic Farmers' Party of Germany	12,088,745	99.71	33
National Front	Free German Youth	12,088,745	99.71	25
National Front	Cultural Association of the GDR	12,088,745	99.71	24
National Front	Democratic Women's League of Germany	12,088,745	99.71	20
National Front	Union of Persecutees of the Nazi Regime	12,088,745	99.71	19
National Front	Peasants Mutual Aid Association	12,088,745	99.71	12
National Front	Social Democratic Party/SDA (East Berlin)	12,088,745	99.71	6
Against		35,544	0.29	–
Total		12,124,289	100.00	466
Valid votes		12,124,289	99.87	
Invalid/blank votes		15,643	0.13	
Total votes		12,139,932	100.00	
Registered voters/turnout		12,325,168	98.50	
Source: Nohlen & Stöver, Sternberger et al.
