= Wilhelmine Schirmer-Pröscher =

East German politician (1889–1992)

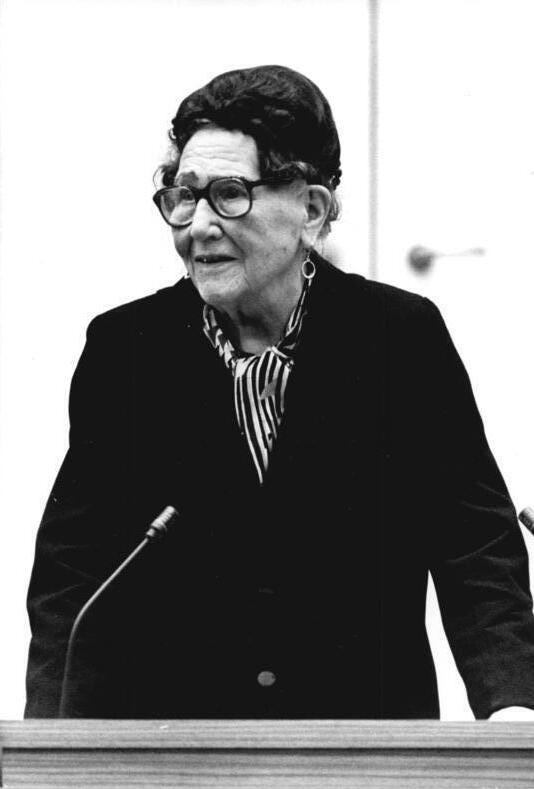
Wilhelmine Schirmer-Pröscher, June 1986

Wilhelmine Schirmer-Pröscher (7 July 1889, Giessen – 2 March 1992, Berlin) was an East German politician of the Liberal Democratic Party of Germany. She received the Order of Karl Marx in 1984.
