= Gerald Götting =

East German politician (1923–2015)

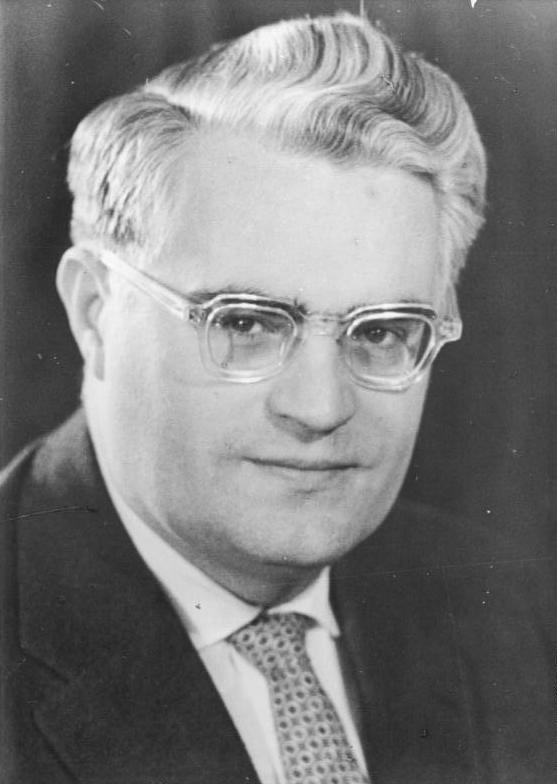
- Gerald Götting in May 1961

Chairman of the Christian Democratic Union
- In office 1966 – 2 November 1989
- Preceded by: August Bach
- Succeeded by: Wolfgang Heyl

President of the Volkskammer
- In office 12 May 1969 – 29 October 1976
- Preceded by: Johannes Dieckmann
- Succeeded by: Horst Sindermann

Deputy Chairman of the State Council
- In office 12 September 1960 – 7 November 1989

Member of the Volkskammer
- In office 1949–1990

Personal details
- Born: 9 June 1923 Nietleben, Province of Saxony; Weimar Republic
- Died: 19 May 2015 (aged 91) Berlin, Germany
- Political party: Christian Democratic Union (1946-)
- Profession: Politician
- Awards: Patriotic Order of Merit, honor clasp (1961); Patriotic Order of Merit, in silver (1955)

Gerald Götting (9 June 1923 – 19 May 2015) was a German politician and chairman of the East German Christian Democratic Union (CDU) from 1966 until 1989. He served as President of the People's Chamber (Volkskammer) from 1969 to 1976 and deputy chairman of the State Council of East Germany from 1960 to 1989.

== Life ==
Götting was born in Nietleben, in the Prussian Province of Saxony, today part of Halle/Saale. During World War II, he served in the Reichsarbeitsdienst, an auxiliary support and supply organization, and later in the Wehrmacht. He was briefly held as a prisoner of war by US forces in 1945.

In 1946, Götting joined the East German Christian Democratic Union, a Christian-democratic party. He then spent two years at the Martin Luther University of Halle, where he studied German studies, history and philology.

In 1949, Götting became General Secretary of the CDU and, after the establishment in the Soviet Zone of the German Democratic Republic (GDR), was elected as a member of the People's Chamber (Volkskammer), the East German legislative body, in which he served for the next forty years. A loyal supporter of the Communist Socialist Unity Party, Götting helped push out those CDU members not willing to do the SED's bidding in the 1950s.

Over the years, Götting came to hold a number of influential positions within the East German state: from 1949 to 1963, he served as the Chairman of the CDU faction in the People's Chamber; from 1958 to 1963 as Deputy Prime Minister of the GDR; and from 1963 to November 1989 Götting served as Deputy Chairman of the Council of State, a position equivalent in rank to the vice-presidency of the GDR. Götting also served as Chairman of the People's Chamber from 1969 to 1976 and as its Vice-Chairman from 1969 to 1989. Finally, Götting was elected Chairman of the CDU at its 1966 party congress. As chairman, he worked closely with the other parties that formed the National Front, the SED-dominated alliance that governed East Germany. During his party leadership, he published brochures exploring the relationship between Christianity and socialism.

Götting held a number of other positions in East German society. From 1961 to 1969, Götting was Vice-President of the German-African Society, and from 1963 he was a member of the Albert Schweitzer Committee. He visited with Schweitzer twice, which meetings he recorded and publicized in his book "Begegnungen mit Albert Schweitzer". In 1976, Götting was elected Chairman of the People's Friendship League of the GDR.

On 2 November 1989, just days before the fall of the Berlin Wall, Götting was forced to resign as Chairman of the CDU. Five days later he stepped down from his position as a member of the Council of State, too. In December Götting was arrested, but released in February 1990.

On 19 May 2015 Götting died in Berlin, aged 91.

== List of works ==
- Der Christ sagt ja zum Sozialismus (1960)
- Begegnung mit Albert Schweitzer (1961)
- Christen und Marxisten in gemeinsamer Verantwortung (1974)
- Christliche Demokraten auf dem Weg in die 90er Jahre (1988)
- Prediger für eine gerechte Welt (1989)

== Sources ==
- Kurt Nowak (1988) Paul Gerhard Braune. Ein Christ der Tat. ISBN 3-922463-57-6.
- David Childs (1983): The GDR: Moscow's German Ally. London: George Allen & Unwin

Political offices
Preceded by Johannes Dieckmann	President of the People's Chamber; 1969–1976	Succeeded by Horst Sindermann
