= List of Provisional Volkskammer members =

With the founding act of the German Democratic Republic on October 7, 1949, the previously existing German People's Council transformed into the Provisional People's Chamber of the GDR. At 12:45 PM on October 7, during its 9th and final session in the Grand Hall of the German Economic Commission, the German People's Council decided to transform itself into the Provisional People's Chamber of the GDR. At 5:35 PM on the same day, the Provisional People's Chamber was constituted. One of the purposes of this constitution was to enact the Constitution of the GDR into effect.

== Composition ==
Faction	Seats of GDR Deputies	Seats of Deputies from Greater Berlin	Total Seats
SED			96
DBD			15
CDU			46
LDPD			46
NDPD			17
FDGB			30
DFD			10
FDJ			10
Kulturbund			35
Union of Persecutees of the Nazi Regime			10
Peasants Mutual Aid Association			5
SDA	-	5	5
Cooperatives			5
Total			330

== Members of the Presidium of the Provisional People's Chamber ==
- President
  Johannes Dieckmann (LDPD)
- Deputy President
  Hermann Matern (SED)
  Hugo Hickmann (CDU) until February 1950
  Josef Rambo (CDU)
  August Bach (CDU)
  Jonny Löhr (NDP) until April 1950
  Heinrich Homann (NDP)
- Members
  Herbert Hoffmann (DBD)
  Erich Geske (SDA)
  Friedel Malter (FDGB)
  Friedrich Ebert (SED)
  Elli Schmidt (DFD)

Note: The composition of the Presidium contradicted Article 57 of the Constitution of the GDR dated October 7, 1949. According to this article, only factions with at least 40 deputies would have been allowed to send a representative to the Presidium. Specifically, this would have been the SED, LDPD, and CDU. The differentiation between NDP and DBD is also striking. While the National Democrats received a deputy position, the DBD was only represented by a member. The reason why no other mass organizations were considered except for the DFD and FDGB is not clear.

== Faction Leaders ==
- Faction of the SED
  Hermann Matern
- Faction of the CDU
  August Bach
- Faction of the LDPD
  Ralph Liebler
- Faction of the DBD
  Paul Scholz
- Faction of the NDPD
  Vincenz Müller
- Faction of the FDGB/FDJ/Cooperatives
  Herbert Warnke
- Faction of the Kulturbund/DFD/VVN
  Klaus Gysi
- Faction of the SDA
  August Burde

== MPs ==
Note: A manual or directory in book form for the deputies of the Provisional People's Chamber was not available until November 2017.

Name	Faction	Remarks
Hermann Abendroth	Kulturbund	
Alexander Abusch	Kulturbund	
Anton Ackermann	SED	
Wilhelm Adam	NDPD	replaced Jonny Löhr, announced on April 19, 1950
Rudolf Agricola	SED	
Heinrich Albert	CDU	
Rudolf Albrecht	DBD	
Friedrich Althans	LDPD	
August Bach	CDU	
Wilhelm Bachem	CDU	
Berta Bähr	DBD	
Edith Baumann	SED	
Anna Baumann-Schosland	CDU	
Johannes R. Becher	Kulturbund	
Friedel Becker	cooperatives	
Leopold Becker	CDU	
Walli Becker	LDPD	moved up for the Abgeordneter Munz, announcement on June 28, 1950
Ernst-Walter Beer	DBD	
Hilde Benjamin	SED	
Reinhold Berger	NDPD	replaced Jakob-Adolf Heilmann, announced on January 18, 1950
Ilse Berghaus	LDPD	
Fritz Beyling	VVN	
Robert Bieri	SED	
Walter Biering	VdgB	
Paul Bismark	SED	on February 22, 1950, announcement of the resignation
Gertrud Boehm	FDGB	Resignation of mandate in mid-October 1949
Heinz Böttcher	FDGB	
Lothar Bolz	NDPD	
Ernst Brandt	SED	
Helmut Brandt	CDU	
Fritz Brauer	CDU	
Peter Braun	LDPD	
Willi Bredel	Kulturbund	
Gertrud Breuer	SED	
Werner Brussels	FDJ	
Theodor Brugsch	Kulturbund	
Werner Bruschke	SED	
Theodor Brylla	FDGB	
Otto Buchwitz	SED	
Hermann Budzislawski	Kulturbund	
Kurt Bürger	SED	
August Burde	SDA	
Gudrun Buske	SED	
Gert Caden	Kulturbund	
Roman Chwalek	FDGB	
Walter Conrad	FDGB	
Josef Czimoniak	DBD	Announcement of the resignation on November 9, 1949
Franz Dahlem	SED	
Siegfried Dallmann	NDPD	
Erich Damerow	LDPD	
Magnus Dedek	CDU	moved up on February 22, 1950
Heinrich Deiters	Kulturbund	
Georg Dertinger	CDU	
Adolf Deter	FDGB	
Johannes Dieckmann	LDPD	
Fritz Dieke	SED	
Ewald Dietrich	LDPD	
Rudolf Dominka	FDJ	
Friedrich Dordel	SED	
Herbert Dulde	LDPD	
Margarethe Dyck	LDPD	
Hans Eberling	SED	
Friedrich Ebert	SED	
Werner Eggerath	SED	
Gerhart Eisler	SED	
Charlotte Eppinger	SED	
Luise Ernst	DFD	moved up for the Abgeordneter Nierste, announcement on June 28, 1950
Ruth Fabisch	LDPD	
Walter Faesser	LDPD	on April 19, 1950, announcement of the resignation
Erich Fascher	CDU	on February 22, 1950, announcement of the resignation
Max Fechner	SED	
Margot Feist	FDJ	
Wilhelm Feldmann	NDPD	
Kurt Fischer	SED	deceased on June 22, 1950
Lena Fischer	SED	
Joachim Flatau	LDPD	
Friedrich Florey	LDPD	in August 1950 fled to the Federal Republic, on September 6, 1950, announcement of the loss of mandate
Erich Frank	LDPD	
Otto Freitag	CDU	
Hans Freund	VVN	
Otto Freyhoff	FDGB	
Heinz Fried	VVN	
Walter Friedrich	Kulturbund	
August Frölich	SED	
Heinz Funke	SED	
Marta Gäbler	DFD	
Hans-Paul Ganter-Gilmans	CDU	
Carl Garz	CDU	
Karl Geissler	SED	
Hermann Gerigk	FDJ	
Rose Gerisch	DFD	
Manfred Gerlach	FDJ	
Heinrich Gerlich	CDU	
Ottomar Geschke	VVN	
Erich Geske	SDA	
Gertrud Glöckner	DFD	
Erich Glückauf	SED	
Bernhard Göring	FDGB	deceased on December 1, 1949
Gerald Götting	CDU	
Arnold Gohr	CDU	
Ernst Goldenbaum	DBD	
Marianne Goosmann	NDPD	In the spring of 1950 he fled to the Federal Republic of Germany, on June 28, 1950, he announced that he had resigned his mandate
Richard Goschütz	SED	
Paul Gräber	SDA	
Günter Grell	FDJ	on February 8, 1950, announcement of the resignation, in March 1950 escape to West Berlin
Karl Grobbel	CDU	
Grete Groh-Kummerlöw	FDGB	following a decision by the parliamentary group on October 17, 1949, for Deputy Böhm
Anna Großkowiak	FDGB	
Otto Grotewohl	SED	
Klaus Gysi	Kulturbund	
Nelly Haalck	DFD	succeeded in May 1950 for the member of parliament Stark-Wintersig
August Hackelberg	SED	
Karl Hamann	LDPD	
Georg Handke	SED	
Charlotte Haufe	FDGB	
Robert Havemann	Kulturbund	
Enno Heidebroek	Kulturbund	
Friedrich August Heiden	cooperatives	
Käthe Heidenberger	CDU	
Gerhard Heidenreich	FDJ	moved up for Helmut Kraus, announcement on November 9, 1949
Werner Heilemann	FDGB	
Jakob-Adolf Heilmann	NDPD	deceased on December 9, 1949
Peter Heilmann	FDJ	
Elisabeth Heinsick	VVN	
Hildegard Heinze	SED	
Rolf Helm	SED	
Leonhard Helmschrott	DBD	
Adolf Hennecke	SED	
Hermann Henselmann	Kulturbund	
Kurt Herrmann	LDPD	died on July 12, 1950
Rudolf Herrnstadt	SED	
Ferdinand Hestermann	Kulturbund	
Hugo Hickmann	CDU	on February 9, 1950, announcement of the resignation
August Hillebrand	CDU	
Wilhelm Höcker	SED	
Ernst Hoffmann	SED	
Heinrich Hoffmann	SED	
Heinz Hoffmann	SED	moved up for the Abgeordneter Kurt Fischer, announcement on August 9, 1950
Herbert Hoffmann	DBD	
Heinrich Homann	NDPD	
Erich Honecker	FDJ	
Erhard Hübener	LDPD	
Wilhelm Imhäuser	LDPD	Moved up for the Abgeordneter Schnee, announced March 22, 1950
Rudolf Jahn	FDGB	
Hans Jendretzky	SED	
Franz Jensch	CDU	
Erich Kahle	SED	
Richard Kain	SED	
Otto Kamps	LDPD	
Hermann Kastner	LDPD	
Waldemar Katsch	SED	
Bernhard Kellermann	Kulturbund	
Katharina Kern	DFD	
Heinz Kessler	FDJ	
Martin Kielblock	LDPD	
Ludwig Kirsch	CDU	Announcement of the resignation on November 9, 1949
Hildegard Kirstein	FDGB	
Willi Kirsten	CDU	
Karl Kleinschmidt	Kulturbund	
Klara Kludas	CDU	
George Knabe	CDU	
Bernard Koenen	SED	
Frieda Koenen	SED	
Wilhelm Koenen	SED	
Walter König	NDPD	
Ingo von Koerber	LDPD	
Otto Körting	VdgB	Mandate expired in July 1950
Josef Kofler	CDU	
Oswald Koltzenburg	NDPD	
Richard Kops	SED	
Vilmos Korn	NDPD	
Helmut Kraus	FDJ	Announced his resignation on November 9, 1949
Kurt Krauspenhaar	SED	
Kurt Krenz	SED	
Wolfgang Kressner	LDPD	on April 19, 1950, announcement of the resignation by fleeing to the Federal Republic of Germany
Alfred Kretzschmer	LDPD	fled to the Federal Republic in the summer of 1950, announcement of the loss of the mandate on August 9, 1950
Harald Krieg	LDPD	moved up on February 8 for the Abgeordneter Blacks, fled to West Germany in late summer 1950, on September 6, 1950, announcement of the loss of the mandate
Kurt Kröning	LDPD	
Erich Krüger	LDPD	moved up for the Abgeordneter Kurt Herrmann, Announcement on August 9, 1950
Ernst Krüger	FDGB	
Greta Kuckhoff	SED	
Jürgen Kuczynski	Kulturbund	
Kurt Kühn	FDGB	
Ludwig Kühn	cooperatives	
Charlotte Küter	Kulturbund	
Franz Lange	cooperatives	
Fritz Lange	SED	
Wolfgang Langhoff	Kulturbund	
Heinrich Lechtenberg	CDU	
Ernst Legal	Kulturbund	
Arthur Lehmann	LDPD	moved up for the Abgeordneter Florey, Announcement September 6, 1950
Helmut Lehmann	SED	
Karl Lerche	SED	
Bruno Leuschner	SED	
Ernst Lewek	VVN	
Hermann Libscher	SED	
Karl Liebetrau	SED	
Ralph Liebler	LDPD	
Arthur Lieutenant*	LDPD	escaped to West Berlin in October 1949
Reinhold Lobedanz	CDU	
Hans Loch	LDPD	
Jonny Lohr	NDPD	Announcement of resignation on April 19, 1950
Ernst Lohagen	SED	
Ernst Lorenz	LDPD	
Georg Lotz	VdgB	
Günther Ludwig	NDPD	
Rudolf Maisel	FDGB	
Friedel Malter	FDGB	
Friedrich Martin	DBD	
Gertrud Marx	VVN	
Hermann Matern	SED	
Johannes Mebus	CDU	
Hans Meier	LDPD	
Otto Meier	SED	
Paul Merker	SED	
Alfred Meusel	Kulturbund	
Karl Mewis	VVN	
Julius Meyer	VVN	
Friedrich Möglich	Kulturbund	
Otto Möller	NDPD	
Otto Moeller	LDPD	died on November 22, 1949
Carl Moltmann	SED	
Erich Mückenberger	SED	
Alfons Müller	LDPD	Resigned October 11, 1949
Hans Müller	SDA	
Hermann Müller	SED	
Richard Müller	DBD	
Vincenz Müller	NDPD	
Ludwig Münz	LDPD	Retired on June 28, 1950
Clare Muth	FDGB	
Otto Nagel	Kulturbund	
Johannes Nelles	Kulturbund	
Ernst Niekisch	Kulturbund	
Luise Nierste	DFD	retired on May 1, 1950
Franz Nitt	CDU	
Albert Norden	SED	
Paul Nowak	CDU	
Otto Nuschke	CDU	
Fred Oelßner	SED	
Josef Orlopp	SED	
Emil Otto	FDGB	
Herbert Papenfuß	FDGB	
Friedrich Pfaffenbach	NDPD	
Heinrich Picker	FDGB	
Wilhelm Pieck	SED	on February 22, 1950, announcement of the resignation
Anton Plenikowski	SED	replaced Paul Bismark on February 22, 1950
Karl Plesse	FDGB	
Werner Pöhls	CDU	
Karl Polak	SED	
Frieda Radel	DFD	
Paul Radtke	SED	
Josef Rambo*	CDU	on January 18, 1950, moved up for Ludwig Kirsch on September 9, 1950, escaped to West Germany
Heinrich Rau	SED	
August Rauer	cooperatives	
Käte Reimer	DBD	
Hans Reingruber	Kulturbund	
Rudi Reinwarth	NDPD	
Maria Rentmeister	DFD	
Julius Richter	CDU	
Paul Richter	LDPD	moved up for Max Suhrbier, announcement on November 9, 1949
Richard Richter	DBD	
Günther Rienäcker	Kulturbund	
Gerhard Rohner	CDU	In January 1950 he fled to West Germany, on February 9, 1950, the announcement was made that his mandate had expired
Robert Rompe	SED	
Berthold Rose	DBD	moved up for Josef Czimoniak, announcement on November 9, 1949
Walter Rübel	CDU	
Walter Rücker	CDU	
Otto Rühle	NDPD	
Carl Günther Ruland	CDU	on February 9, 1950, announcement of the resignation
Willy Rumpf	SED	
Ellen Ruschmann	FDGB	
Paul Sack	FDGB	
Willy Sägebrecht	SED	
Victor Sandman	CDU	
Gertrud Sasse	LDPD	Moved up for the Abgeordneter War, announced September 6, 1950
Kurt Saupe	SED	
Erna Schäfer	CDU	
Kurt Schatter	VVN	
Heinz Schaumann	SED	
Günter Schernbeck	LDPD	
Felix Scheffler	DBD	on March 22, 1950, announcement of the resignation
Eugen Schiffer	LDPD	
Rose Schilling	SED	
Wilhelmine Schirmer-Pröscher	DFD	
Artur Schlesinger	LDPD	
Hermann Schlimme	FDGB	
Elli Schmidt	DFD	
Milly Schmidt	LDPD	
Richard Schmidt	SED	
Eva Schmidt-Kolmer	DFD	
Matthias Schnee	LDPD	replaced Alfons Müller on October 11, 1949, announcement of the loss of mandate on February 22, 1950
Georg Schöpflin	SED	
Paul Scholz	DBD	
Rudolf Scholz	LDPD	moved up for the Abgeordneter Wenk, announcement on April 19, 1950
Anneliese Schubert	SED	
Alfred Schultheiss	LDPD	
Berta Schulze	SED	
Otto Schwarz	Kulturbund	
Reinhold Schwarz	LDPD	
Kurt Schwarze	LDPD	on February 8, 1950, announcement of the resignation due to simultaneous mandate in the state chamber
Rudolf Schwarzer	SED	
Herbert Sedlaczek	Kulturbund	
Fritz Selbmann	SED	
Max Seydewitz	SED	
Carl Siebenpfeiffer	CDU	
Hans-Joachim Siekiera	LDPD	replaced the deceased Deputy Moeller, announcement on December 7, 1949
Gustav Siemon	NDPD	moved up for the Abgeordneter Goosmann, announcement on June 28, 1950
Robert Siewert	SED	
Bernhard Singer	CDU	moved up on February 22, 1950 relieved of all party offices in June 1950 as a Hickmann supporter
Robert Sommer	LDPD	moved up for the Abgeordneter Kressner, announcement on April 19, 1950
Alexander Starck	FDGB	Member from December 1949, replacing Bernhard Göring
Magdalena Stark-Wintersig	DFD	resigned in May 1950
Erwin Steffen	LDPD	moved up for the Abgeordneter Kretschmer, announcement on August 9, 1950
Johannes Stefko	LDPD	
Luitpold Steidle	CDU	
Karl Steinhoff	SED	
Peter Alfons Steiniger	Kulturbund	
Günter Stempel	LDPD	Arrested in August 1950
Wilhelm von Stoltzenberg	LDPD	
Willi Stoph	SED	Replaced Wilhelm Pieck on February 22, 1950
Hans-Gotthilf Strasser	LDPD	
Johannes Stroux	Kulturbund	
Hans Stubbe	Kulturbund	
Max Suhrbier	LDPD	on November 9, 1949, announcement of the resignation due to the simultaneous mandate in the state chamber
Paul Sztob	SED	
Herbert Täschner	LDPD	moved up for the Abgeordneter Barrels, announced April 19, 1950
Elisabeth Teichmüller	SED	
Johannes Teubert	CDU	
Walter Thiem	DBD	
Gertrud Thürmer	LDPD	
Walter Thürmer	LDPD	
Ferdinand Thun	FDJ	
Marie Torhorst	SED	
Siegfried Trommsdorff	CDU	
Johannes Trost	SED	
Walter Ulbricht	SED	
Wolfgang Ullrich	CDU	
Herbert Vahl	DBD	replaced Felix Scheffler, announcement on March 22, 1950
Kurt Vieweg	VdgB	
Paul Wandel	SED	
Willy Warning	CDU	moved up on February 22, 1950
Herbert Warnke	FDGB	
Johannes Warnke	SED	
Hermann Waschow	FDGB	
Friedrich Wehmer	VdgB	
Helene Weigel	Kulturbund	
Fritz Weißhaupt	DBD	
Erna Wenk	LDPD	March 1950 Expulsion from all offices, on April 19, 1950, announcement of the resignation
Gustav-Adolf Werner	SDA	
Paul Wessel	SED	
Herbert Wetzstein	LDPD	
Werner Winkler	FDGB	
Gustav Wirth	SED	
Hans Wittenburg	CDU	
Adam Wolfram	FDGB	
Frieda Wollermann-Köckeritz	SED	
Joseph Wujciak	CDU	
Alfred Wonderful	NDPD	
Richard Zänkner	FDGB	
Wilhelm Zaisser	SED	
Leo Zuckermann	SED	
Arnold Zweig	Kulturbund	
