= List of members of the first Volkskammer =

This is a list of members of the Volkskammer, the supreme power organ of East Germany, for the 1st election period.

== Composition ==
In the Volkskammer election on October 19, 1950, according to official information, 99.72% of the voters voted for the proposal of the National Front (with a voter turnout of 99.7%).

Faction	Seats of GDR Deputies	Seats of Deputies from Greater Berlin	Total Seats
Socialist Unity Party of Germany	100	10	110
Democratic Farmers' Party of Germany	30	3	33
Christian Democratic Union (East Germany)	60	7	67
Liberal Democratic Party of Germany	60	6	66
National Democratic Party of Germany (DDR)	30	5	35
Free German Trade Union Federation	40	9	49
Democratic Women's League of Germany	15	5	20
Free German Youth	20	5	25
Cultural Association of the GDR	20	4	24
Union of Persecutees of the Nazi Regime	15	4	19
Peasants Mutual Aid Association	10	2	12
Social Democratic Action	-	6	6
Total	400	66	466

== Presidium ==
- President of the People's Chamber
  Johannes Dieckmann (LDPD)
- Vice Presidents of the People's Chamber
  Hermann Matern (SED)
  Gerald Götting (CDU)
  Ernst Goldenbaum (DBD)
  Vincenz Müller (NDPD) until 1952
  Heinrich Homann (NDPD) from December 17, 1952
- Members
  Friedrich Ebert (SED)
  Wilhelmine Schirmer-Pröscher (DFD)
  Erich Geske (SDA) until 1953
  Grete Groh-Kummerlöw (FDGB)

== Faction Leaders ==
- Faction of the SED
  Hermann Matern
- Faction of the DBD
  Berthold Rose
- Faction of the CDU
  August Bach until 1952
  Max Sefrin from 1952
- Faction of the LDPD
  Ralph Liebler until 1953
- Faction of the NDPD
  Vincenz Müller until 1952
  Heinrich Homann from 1952
- Faction of the FDGB
  Herbert Warnke until 1953
  Rudolf Kirchner from 1953
- Faction of the DFD
  Erna Schäfer until 1953
- Faction of the FDJ
  Heinz Keßler
- Faction of the Cultural Association
  Erich Wendt
- Faction of the VVN
  Ottomar Geschke
- Faction of the SDA
  Erich Geske
- Faction of the VdgB
  Friedrich Wehmer

== Members of Parliament ==
Note: A handbook or directory in book form for the members of the 1st legislative period of the People's Chamber (Volkskammer) is not yet available. Through the evaluated sources, a relatively high percentage of completeness has been achieved. However, there might still be missing members. Especially the section labeled "Annotations" in the table should be considered a critical source. Only the entered dates of death can be considered as confirmed. The sources for information regarding leaving the parliament are mostly based on session protocols. These represent the official interpretation. The actual reasons for leaving (arrest, party expulsion, etc.) are rarely mentioned in the protocols. Discrepancies in timing can also occur. As the People's Chamber had extended session breaks, there was often a significant time span between the reason and the notification of mandate loss. Only the data for mandate successors can be regarded as confirmed, although it's not excluded that these members were already active in People's Chamber committees outside of the parliamentary sessions before official mandate recognition.

Name	Faction	Annotations
Anton Ackermann	SED	
Wilhelm Adam	NDPD	
Ruth Adler	FDGB	
Bruno Agotz	Kulturbund	Berlin representative
Rudolf Agricola	SED	
Rudolf Albrecht	DBD	relieved of all functions in December 1952
Heinrich Allmeroth	FDGB	
Friedrich Althans	LDPD	After previously fleeing, the loss of his mandate was announced on May 23, 1952
Georg André	NDPD	
Hermann Apelt	Union of Persecutees of the Nazi Regime	on October 31, 1951, he replaced MP Knoch
August Bach	CDU	Group leader
Wilhelm Bachem	CDU	in January 1951 escape to the Federal Republic of Germany on March 2, 1951, announcement of loss of mandate
Arno Bähr	LDPD	
Hannelore Baender	FDJ	arrested in November 1952 on December 17, 1952, announcement of his resignation
Hans Baer	LDPD	died on August 6, 1954
Luise Bäuml	FDJ	
Renate Bahmann	SED	
Kurt Barthel	Kulturbund	Member of the SED
Hieronymus Bartkowiak	CDU	
Johann Bartl	SED	
Edith Baumann	SED	
Johannes R. Becher	Kulturbund	Member of the SED
Ernst-Walter Beer	DBD	
Paul Behrendt	SED	
Hilde Benjamin	SED	
Elsbeth Benthin	DFD	
Fritz Bergemann	FDGB	
Reinhold Berger	NDPD	moved up on October 31, 1951 on December 18, 1953, announcement of resignation, exclusion from the party
Hans Bertram	LDPD	
Otto Beuer	Cooperatives	arrested in April 1951 on May 23, 1952, announcement of loss of mandate
Fritz Beyling	Union of Persecutees of the Nazi Regime	Member of the SED
Wilhelm Bick	SED	
Jost Biedermann	CDU	On December 17, 1952, he replaced the deputy Fruhner; Berlin representative
Walter Biering	VdgB	Member of the SED
Ilse Biesmann	FDJ	married Endter
Rudolf Blankenburger	Cooperatives	Member of the SED
Johannes Blender	SED	Berlin representative
Otto Block	DBD	
Gudrun Boche	LDPD	in May 1954 resigned his mandate due to suspicion of espionage on June 3, 1954, notification of his resignation from his mandate
Richard Börner	SED	on September 12, 1951, declaration of resignation under pressure from the state party control commission because of the SA past. Notification of resignation on May 23, 1952
Lothar Bolz	NDPD	
Werner Bonk	SED	
Edith Brandt (born Bonefeld)	SED	
Fritz Brauer	CDU	
Curt-Artur Brauns	NDPD	removed from all party positions in April 1952 on July 23, 1952, announcement of his resignation
Theodor Brugsch	Kulturbund	Berlin representative
Werner Bruschke	SED	
Otto Buchwitz	SED	Senior President
Margaret Buder	SED	moved up on February 17, 1954
Kurt Bürger	SED	died on July 28, 1951
Lina Bunge	SED	
Friedrich Burmeister	CDU	
Roman Chwalek	FDGB	Member of the SED
Manfred Clasen	LDPD	
Horst Claußner	FDJ	
Herbert Croy	DBD	Berlin representative
August Czempiel	FDGB	Berlin representative died on March 26, 1952
Fritz Dähn	SED	
Otto Dänecke	CDU	died on July 4, 1953
Franz Dahlem	SED	Initially excluded in 1953 official resignation on February 3, 1954
Paul Dahm	SED	on May 23, 1952, announcement of his resignation
Elfriede Dallmann	NDPD	Berlin representative
Siegfried Dallmann	NDPD	
Magnus Dedek	CDU	
Heinrich Deiters	Kulturbund	Member of the SED
Georg Dertinger	CDU	arrested in January 1953 on February 5, 1953, his mandate was revoked
Adolf Deter	FDGB	Berlin representative
Johannes Dieckmann	LDPD	President of the People's Chamber
Karl Dölling	CDU	
Horst Dohlus	SED	
Otto Dohne	SED	Berlin representative
Edith Donath	Union of Persecutees of the Nazi Regime	Berlin representative
Karl Dudziak	DBD	
Margarethe Dyck	LDPD	
Klaus-Jürgen Ebelt	LDPD	moved up on August 25, 1953
Friedrich Ebert	SED	Vice President
Werner Eggerath	SED	
Elisabeth Eichhorn	LDPD	
Elfriede Engel	FDJ	died on January 28, 1954
Kurt Engel	FDGB	
Karl-Heinz Enger	LDPD	
Wilhelm Engler	SED	
Luise Ermisch	DFD	Member of the SED
Georg Evenius	SDA	Berlin representative
Ruth Fabisch	LDPD	
Hubert Faensen	CDU	
Rudolf Missing	LDPD	Berlin representative
Margot Feist	FDJ	member of the SED; Honecker later married
Willy Fehrmann	LDPD	on October 2, 1953, notification of the expiration of his mandate
Wilhelm Feldmann	NDPD	
Charlotte Fenske	Union of Persecutees of the Nazi Regime	replaced MP J. Meyer on February 3, 1954
Fritz Fichtner	CDU	
Charlotte Finsterbusch	DFD	
Karl Fischer	Union of Persecutees of the Nazi Regime	
Lucie Fischer	FDGB	Schleder later married
Rosel Fischer	NDPD	Walther later married
Werner Fischer	LDPD	
Joachim Flatau	LDPD	
Manfred Flegel	NDPD	
Peter Florin	SED	On February 3, 1954, he replaced MP Dahlem
Paul Fortak	DBD	on July 23, 1952, replaced MP Krautschick
Fritz Framke	SDA	Berlin representative on March 2, 1951, announcement of his resignation for health reasons
Hans Heinrich Franck	Kulturbund	Member of the SED
Hugo Franke	FDGB	
Egbert von Frankenberg and Proschlitz	NDPD	Member from October 31, 1951; replaced Heinz Neukirchen; Resigned from office on April 21, 1954; Berlin representative
Otto Freitag	CDU	
Robert Fremde	SED	
Hans Freund	Union of Persecutees of the Nazi Regime	Member of the SED
Heinrich Fried	Union of Persecutees of the Nazi Regime	Member until September 1, 1952, arrested in November. Announcement of resignation on December 17, 1952
Walter Friedrich	Kulturbund	
Wolfgang Friedrich	FDGB	
Max Fritsch	FDGB	
Alfons Fruhner	CDU	on December 17, 1952, announcement of his departure
Heinz Funke	SED	
Otto Funke	SED	
Hans-Paul Ganter-Gilmans	CDU	
Paul Geisler	FDGB	Member of the SED
Ferdinand Geißler	FDGB	
Max Gerhardt	SED	
Hermann Gerigk	CDU	removed from all positions in April 1952 on December 17, 1952, announcement of his resignation
Manfred Gerlach	FDJ	Member of the LDPD
Erich Geske	SDA	Berlin representative
Ottomar Geschke	Union of Persecutees of the Nazi Regime	Group leader Member of the SED
Gerald Götting	CDU	Vice President
Willi Götting	SDA	on March 2, 1951, moved up for Deputy Framke
Margarete Götzelt	Cooperatives	
Arnold Gohr	CDU	Berlin representative
Ernst Goldenbaum	DBD	Vice President
Richard Goschütz	SED	
Hermann Gräfe	DBD	
Kurt Gregor	SED	replaced MP Kahmann on July 23, 1952
Gertrud Grobosch	SED	Berlin representative
Grete Groh-Kummerlöw	FDGB	Member of the Presidium; Member of the SED
Roberta Gropper	DFD	Berlin representative Member of the SED
Otto Grotewohl	SED	
Heinrich Grüber	Union of Persecutees of the Nazi Regime	
Klaus Gysi	Kulturbund	Member of the SED
Georg Hagner	Cooperatives	Berlin representative
Franz Hahn	NDPD	
Karl Hamann	LDPD	Revocation of mandate on December 17, 1952
Dora Hanisch	SED	moved up on February 17, 1954
Georg Handke	SED	
Ludwig Harms	CDU	
Charlotte Hartwig	Union of Persecutees of the Nazi Regime	Member of the FDJ
Robert Havemann	Kulturbund	Berlin representative Member of the SED
Alfons Dietrich Hedemann	LDPD	November 1953 expulsion from the party
Gerhard Heidenreich	FDJ	Member of the SED
Werner Heilemann	FDGB	Member of the SED
Emma Heinrich	CDU	on November 25, 1953, for the Abg. Trommsdorff moved up
Hildegard Heinze	Union of Persecutees of the Nazi Regime	Chair of the Petitions Committee
Irene Heller	DFD	
Heinz Hellwege	CDU	
Leonhard Helmschrott	DBD	Berlin representative
Elsbeth Helmuth	FDJ	later married under the name Wagner, resigned from office on June 3, 1954
Adolf Hennecke	SED	
Liselotte Hennig	FDJ	
Reinhold Hennig	NDPD	moved up on October 31, 1951
Elsa Hentschke	SED	
Johannes Herdegen	LDPD	
Martin Hermann	DBD	
Erich Hermenau	FDGB	moved up on February 5, 1953
Käthe Herrmann	DFD	on December 17, 1952, announcement of his resignation
Rudolf Herrnstadt	SED	on February 17, 1954, announcement of his resignation
Helmut Heßler	LDPD	
Waldtraut Heßler	FDJ	later married under the name Hackenbeck
August Hillebrand	CDU	died on April 17, 1953
Josef Hodes	CDU	
Wilhelm Höcker	SED	
Fritz Hofer	SDA	Berlin representative
Alois Hoffmann	LDPD	Resigned from office on April 21, 1954
Ernst Hoffmann	SED	Berlin representative
Heinz Hoffmann	SED	
Herbert Hoffmann	DBD	
Kurt Hoffmann	CDU	Berlin representative
Ursula Hoht	FDJ	
Heinrich Homann	NDPD	Vice President
Erich Honecker	FDJ	Member of the SED
Hans Hummel	CDU	
Berta Illinger	DBD	on July 23, 1952, for the deputy R. Richter
Wilhelm Imhäuser	LDPD	
Rudolf Jäger	FDGB	
Rudolf Jährling	FDGB	
Rudi Jahn	SED	
Anna Jahnke	DBD	
Georg Jedraszcyk	SED	Berlin representative
Wilhelm Jendras	DBD	
Hans Jendretzky	SED	Member until 1953
Artur Jentzsch	LDPD	moved up on April 21, 1954
Karl Jünemann	CDU	
Otto Jungmann	LDPD	
Anton Kaczmarek	CDU	In the summer of 1953, at the urging of the CDU leadership, he resigned from his mandate
Irmgard Kahmann	SED	on October 31, 1951, moved up for MP Rakow on July 23, 1952, announcement of resignation
Gerhard Kaiser	SED	
Willi Kaiser	FDJ	
Hermann Kalb	CDU	
Gerhard Kalmring	LDPD	moved up on April 21, 1954
Erna Kamieniczny	DFD	Berlin representative
Herbert Kamrath	FDGB	Berlin representative died on October 12, 1953
Leopold Keidel	FDGB	
Bernhard Kellermann	Kulturbund	died on October 17, 1951
Katharina Kern	DFD	Berlin representative Member of the SED
Heinz Keßler	FDJ	Member of the SED
Martin Kielblock	LDPD	
Bruno Kiesler	FDJ	
Friedrich Kind	CDU	on February 6, 1952, moved up for MP Sarter
Ruth Kirchhoff	NDPD	
Walter Kirchhoff	NDPD	
Rudolf Kirchner	FDGB	On October 31 he replaced MP Starck; Group leader from 1953
Anna Kleinke	SED	
Karl Kleinschmidt	Kulturbund	Member of the SED
Victor Klemperer	Kulturbund	Member of the SED
Klara Kludas	CDU	
Georg Knabe	CDU	in May 1951 escaped to the Federal Republic of Germany on September 15, 1951, mandate canceled
Karl Kneschke	Kulturbund	Member of the SED
Karl-Heinz Kniestedt	SED	Berlin representative
Otto Knoch	Union of Persecutees of the Nazi Regime	on October 31, 1951, announcement of loss of mandate
Helmut Koch	FDJ	Berlin representative
Liselotte Köhler	FDJ	later married under the name Roloff
Minna Köhler	SED	replaced MP Lauter on February 3, 1954
Willi Köhler	LDPD	on November 25, 1953, notification of his departure
Bernard Koenen	SED	
Wilhelm Koenen	SED	
Walter König	NDPD	
Ingo von Koerber	LDPD	
Josef Kofler	CDU	Berlin representative
Kurt Koloc	Kulturbund	
Oswald Koltzenburg	NDPD	
Aribert Konieczny	CDU	
Willi-Peter Konzok	LDPD	
Vilmos Korn	NDPD	
Otto Korrmann	DBD	
Richard Krams	SED	
Heinrich Krapohl	LDPD	moved up on November 25, 1953
Anna Krause	SED	
Lisa Krause	SED	
Otto Krauss	LDPD	
Georg Krautschick	DBD	on July 23, 1952, announcement of loss of mandate
Walter Krebaum	SED	on December 17, 1952, announcement of his resignation
Georg Kremer	FDGB	died on October 1, 1953
Kurt Krenz	SED	
Ursula Kress	LDPD	
Ingeborg Kreter	NDPD	on October 31, 1951, announcement of loss of mandate
	LDPD	
Herbert Kröger	SED	
Erwin Krubke	CDU	
Jürgen Kuczynski	Kulturbund; Member of the SED	
Kurt Kühn	FDGB	
Willi Kuhn	FDGB	
Charlotte Küter	Kulturbund	
Alfons Kujat	CDU	
Johann Kunzke	SED	on July 30, 1953, notification of the expiration of the mandate
Anna Lange	DFD	Berlin representative
Fritz Lange	SED	
Helene Lange	SED	1953 Resignation from office for health reasons
Inge Long	FDJ	moved up on July 30, 1953
Werner Lange	DBD	
Hermann Langenberg	SED	
Johannes Latzke	CDU	
Dora Lau	FDGB	Berlin representative
Hans Lauffer	NDPD	Berlin representative
Hans Lauter	SED	on August 26, 1953, notification of resignation from office on February 17, 1954, further announcement of resignation from office
Heinrich Lechtenberg	CDU	
Arthur Lehmann	LDPD	
Helmut Lehmann	SED	
Josef Lehnert	CDU	Berlin representative
Johannes Leipoldt	CDU	on July 30, 1953, for the Abg. Dertinger moved up
Hedwig Lenz	SED	later married under the name Wichmann
Rudolf Lessig	DBD	
Harri Leupold	LDPD	moved up on July 30, 1953 1953; Berlin representative
Bruno Leuschner	SED	moved up on August 25, 1953
Ernst Lewek	Union of Persecutees of the Nazi Regime	Member of the CDU
Edith Liebig	SED	
Ralph Liebler	LDPD	Group leader until 1953 died on November 21, 1953
Günther Lieske	SED	
Marianne List	LDPD	
Reinhold Lobedanz	CDU	
Hans Loch	LDPD	
Jonny Löhr	NDPD	moved up on April 21, 1954
Ernst Lohagen	SED	on July 23, 1952, announcement of his resignation
Hans Lohrisch	NDPD	on October 31, 1951, announcement of loss of mandate
Alfred Lontzeck	NDPD	
Ernst Lorenz	LDPD	
Georg Lotz	VdgB	
Gerhard Lucht	Cooperatives	Member of the SED
Eva Ludwig	NDPD	
Margaret Ludwig	CDU	
Gertrud Lück	SED	
Martin Lüder	LDPD	Berlin representative
Karl Lukits	FDJ	Berlin representative Member of the CDU
Franz Lukowiak	CDU	
Emma Maaß	DBD	on August 26, 1953, notification of resignation
Charlotte Mäßig	CDU	only recorded in the minutes until 1952
Ernst Makeprange	DBD	
Friedel Malter	FDGB	Member of the SED
Friedrich Martin	DBD	on July 30, 1953, notification of the expiration of the mandate
Heinz-Wolfram Mascher	CDU	
Hermann Matern	SED	Vice President
Adolf Maurer	CDU	
Georg Mayer	SED	
Hans Meier	LDPD	fled on March 12, 1953, notification of expiration of the mandate on July 30, 1953
Heinrich Meier	NDPD	moved up on February 5, 1953
Helmut Mehnert	CDU non-attached	Expelled from the party in the summer of 1951
Gerhard Melzer	LDPD	Announcement of resignation on February 3, 1954
Martha Melzer	DBD	1954 resignation of mandate
Alfred Menske	SDA	Berlin representative
Robert Menzel	FDJ	Berlin representative Member of the SED
Else Merke	DBD	moved up on August 25, 1953
Alexander Mette	Kulturbund	
Alfred Meusel	Kulturbund	Berlin representative Member of the SED
Karl Mewis	Union of Persecutees of the Nazi Regime	Member from February 6, 1952; Member of the SED
Julius Meyer	Union of Persecutees of the Nazi Regime	retired in 1953; Escape on January 15, 1953, in connection with the doctor conspiracy; On February 5, 1953, notification of the expiration of the mandate Member of the SED
Liane Möller	FDJ	Berlin representative on June 3, 1954, notification of waiver of mandate
Otto Möller	NDPD	
Heinrich Moritz	CDU	
Helga Mucke-Wittbrodt	DFD	Member of the SED
Erich Mückenberger	SED	
Frieda Müller	DBD	Berlin representative
Hans Müller	LDPD	
Hans Müller	SDA	Berlin representative
Helmut Müller	LDPD	
Richard Müller	DBD	
Vincenz Müller	NDPD	Group leader until 1952
Otto Nagel	Kulturbund	Member of the SED
Werner Nagel	SED	
Annemarie Naß	CDU	on April 11, 1951, moved up for MP Rotter
Arndt Nestler	FDGB	
Heinz Neukirchen	NDPD	Berlin representative on October 31, 1951, announcement of loss of mandate
Alfred Neumann	SED	
Herbert Neumann	CDU	Berlin representative
Ilse Neumann	DBD	on April 11, 1951, announcement of his resignation
Ernst Niekisch	Kulturbund	after the events surrounding the 17th June 1953 Resignation from office Member of the SED
Werner Niendorf	CDU	
Johanna Noack	SED	Berlin representative
Johannes Northeim	SED	
Paul Nowak	CDU	on February 3, 1954, announcement of his resignation
Winfried Nowak	LDPD	
Otto Nuschke	CDU	
Otto Oehme	CDU	
Fred Oelßner	SED	
Georg Ohm	SED	
Max Opitz	SED	
Hermann Oschatz	NDPD	
Emil Otto	FDGB	Member of the SED
Georg Oxenbauer	SED	moved up on February 17, 1954
Willy Pabst	Cooperatives	
Fritz Panteleit	DBD	moved up on August 25, 1953
Herbert Papenfuß	FDGB	on December 17, 1952, announcement of his resignation
Margarethe Paul	NDPD	
Anneliese Pech	LDPD	Berlin representative
Gerhard Peter	LDPD	
Walter Petzold	SED	
Friedrich Pfaffenbach	NDPD	Berlin representative
Susanne Pfannenberg	CDU	
Günther Pfau	SED	
Paul Pflock	LDPD	
Erich Pfrötzschner	FDGB	
Anton Plenikowski	SED	
Arthur Plötz	SED	
Erna Pohl	FDGB	
Karl Polak	SED	
Emil Posch	LDPD	
Lydia Poser	SED	
Martha Puttrus	DFD	
Bernhard Quandt	SED	Moved up in 1953
Annette Radke	SED	
Albert Radtke	LDPD	
Erna Rakow	SED	on October 31, 1951, announcement of loss of mandate
Heinrich Rau	SED	
Erich Rehberg	FDGB	Berlin representative
Fritz Reiche	CDU	
Ilse Reichel	SED	
Hans Reichelt	DBD	
Irmgard Reinisch	SED	
Rudi Reinwarth	NDPD	
Elli Reuter	FDGB	
Martin Richter	NDPD	moved up for the deputy on December 18, 1953. Berger
Paul Richter	LDPD	on October 31, 1951, announcement of loss of mandate
Richard Richter	DBD	on July 23, 1952, announcement of loss of mandate
Otto Ringel	SED	moved up on July 30, 1953
Paul Roch	DBD	
Herbert Roepke	SED	
Wolfgang Rösser	NDPD	
Vera Rohde	FDGB	Berlin representative
Alfred Rohrbeck	FDGB	Berlin representative
Fritz Roocks	LDPD	replaced the deputy judge on July 23, 1952
Berthold Rose	DBD	Group leader
Walter Roske	FDGB	
Barbara Rotter	CDU	on April 11, 1951, announcement of his resignation
Walter Rübel	CDU	in January 1953 escape to the Federal Republic of Germany on February 5, 1953, notification of escape, expiration of the mandate
Otto Rühle	NDPD	
Willy Rumpf	SED	
Hans-Joachim Rustenbach	LDPD	
Otto Sadler	CDU	
Aenne Saefkow	Union of Persecutees of the Nazi Regime	Berlin representative Member of the SED
Willy Sägebrecht	SED	
Kurt Säuberlich	Kulturbund	Member of the SED
Victor Sandmann	CDU	fled in March 1953, notified on July 30, 1953, that his mandate had expired
Hildegard Sarter	CDU	mandate canceled on September 15, 1951
Gertrud Sasse	LDPD	
Ursula Sawitzke	CDU	Berlin representative
Elisabeth Schäfer	NDPD	moved up on April 21, 1954
Erna Schäfer	DFD	Resigned in 1953, parliamentary group leader
Kurt Schatter	Union of Persecutees of the Nazi Regime	
Heinrich Schaub	LDPD	moved up on August 25, 1953
Heinz Scheffler	SED	
Fritz Scheinert	SED	
Lothar Schiele		Berlin representative
Rosa Schilling	DFD	
Karl Schirdewan	SED	replaced MP Lohagen on July 23, 1952
Wilhelmine Schirmer-Pröscher	DFD	Member of the LDPD
Erwin Schlemmer	SED	
Artur Schlesinger	LDPD	
Hermann Schlimme	FDGB	Berlin representative Member of the SED
Elli Schmidt	DFD	Member of the SED
Georg Schmidt	LDPD	Berlin representative
Heinz Schmidt	FDGB	
Hertha Schmidt	DFD	
Martin Schmidt	SED	
Max Schmidt	CDU	
Milly Schmidt	LDPD	
Richard Schmidt	SED	
Georg Schneider	SED	
Max Schneider	NDPD	Berlin representative
Hans von Schnitzler	DBD	
Hans Schober	LDPD	
Paul Scholz	DBD	
Horst Schomacker	LDPD	
Hans Schröder	Union of Persecutees of the Nazi Regime	
Michael Schröder	SED	
Eugen Schröter	FDGB	moved up on February 5, 1953
Helene Schubert	DBD	on April 11, 1951, moved up for MP Neumann
Richard Schülbe	FDGB	
Arno Schulz	LDPD	
Otto Schulz	FDGB	
Ullrich Schulz	FDGB	
Eleonore Schumann	LDPD	Moved up in 1952
Rudolf Schwandt	DBD	
Hildegard Schwarz	DFD	Berlin representative
Reinhold Schwarz	LDPD	died on February 29, 1952
Otto Schwarz	Kulturbund	Member of the SED
Martha Schweiger	FDGB	
Charlotte Schwerdtfeger	DFD	
Fritz Sebastian	SED	
Max Sefrin	CDU	On December 17, 1952, he replaced MP Gerigk; Group leader
Kurt Seibt	Union of Persecutees of the Nazi Regime	moved up on November 25, 1953; Member of the SED
Hans Seigewasser	Union of Persecutees of the Nazi Regime	Member of the SED
Hermann Selbach	LDPD	Berlin representative on August 4 announced loss of mandate
Fritz Selbmann	SED	
Käte Selbmann	DFD	
Charlotte Sembdner	NDPD	
Heinz Semrau	SED	
Alfons Sendrowski	SED	
Otto Sepke	SED	
Max Seydewitz	SED	
Rolf Seyfarth	LDPD	
Carl Siebenpfeiffer	CDU	
Johanna Sieber	FDGB	
Hans-Joachim Siekiera	LDPD	Member until 1951
Gustav Siemon	NDPD	
Frieda Sitter	SED	
Gertrud Soelch	FDGB	
Robert Sommer	LDPD	
Werner Staake	Kulturbund	
Alexander Starck	FDGB	removed from office in May 1951 on October 31, 1951, announcement of loss of mandate
Erwin Steffen	LDPD	
Johannes Stefko	LDPD	
Luitpold Steidle	CDU	
Rudolf Steinwand	Union of Persecutees of the Nazi Regime	Member of the SED
Antonie Stemmler	Union of Persecutees of the Nazi Regime	Member of the SED
Hans Günther Stibbe	CDU	
Erich Stoll	CDU	
Wilhelm von Stoltzenberg	LDPD	in February 1953 escape to the Federal Republic of Germany on February 5, 1953, notification of escape, expiration of the mandate
Willi Stoph	SED	
Jakob Straub	SED	
Annemarie Straubing	FDJ	
Otto Strauss	SED	
Franz Striemann	SED	
Ilse Striffler	FDGB	
Johannes Stroux	Kulturbund	died on August 25, 1954
Edgar Strumpfl	DBD	
Heinz Stubenrauch	CDU	
Max Suhrbier	LDPD	
Herbert Täschner	LDPD	
Gertrud Teschner	SED	Berlin representative died on August 10, 1954
Gerhard Teske		moved up on July 30, 1953
Erich Teubig	LDPD	Berlin representative, escaped in July 1952
Rosa Thälmann	Union of Persecutees of the Nazi Regime	Member of the SED
Oswald Thiel	FDGB	mandate canceled on September 15, 1951
Ilse Thiele	DFD	moved up on February 17, 1954; Member of the SED
Walter Thierfelder	LDPD	
Margaret Thon	CDU	Berlin representative
Walter Thürmer	LDPD	
Elsa Thurmann	Cooperatives	Berlin representative mandate canceled on September 15, 1951
Heinrich Tobias	Union of Persecutees of the Nazi Regime	Berlin representative
Heinrich Toeplitz	CDU	on March 2, 1951, he replaced MP Bachem
Alfred Tottewitz	LDPD	
Ferdinand Trauboth	NDPD	
Hedwig Trentowski	SED	
Otto Trillitzsch	SED	Fall 1953 Resignation from office
Siegfried Trommsdorff	CDU	In July 1952 he fled to the Federal Republic of Germany
Elfriede Überhamm	SDA	Berlin representative
Bodo Uhse	SED	
Carl Ulbricht	CDU	
Walter Ulbricht	SED	
Helmut Unger	FDGB	
Fritz Uschner	SED	on August 26, 1953, notification of resignation
Kurt Vieweg	VdgB	Member of the SED
Ewald Voelker	LDPD	
Erich Wächter	CDU	
Else Wagner	DBD	
Paul Wandel	SED	
Willy Warning	CDU	
Herbert Warnke	FDGB	
Johannes Warnke	SED	
Friedrich Wehmer	VdgB	Group leader Member of the SED
Rudi Weinreich	SED	Berlin representative on July 30, 1953, notification of the expiration of the mandate
Ilse Weintraud	NDPD	
Fritz Weißhaupt	DBD	
Ursula Weißhuhn	CDU	
Erich Wendt	Kulturbund	Group leader Member of the SED
Josef Wenig	FDGB	
Elisabeth Werth	FDJ	later married under the name Niederberger
Harald Werthmann	LDPD	moved up on August 25, 1953
Kurt Westphal	SED	
Herbert Wetzstein	LDPD	
Ernst Wicha	DBD	
Hans Wiedemann	CDU	On February 3, 1954, he replaced MP Dänecke
Erich Winkler	LDPD	
Hans-Joachim Winkler	FDGB	Member of the SED
Otto Winzer	SED	
Erich Wirth	FDGB	
Gustav Wirth	SED	
Alfred Wittig	Union of Persecutees of the Nazi Regime	Berlin representative
Iris Wittig	FDJ	on August 4, 1954, notification of resignation
Margarete Wittkowski	Cooperatives	moved up on July 23, 1952; Member of the SED
Charlotte Wittmar	CDU	
Adelheid Wolf	SED	
Fritz Wolff	LDPD	Member since 1953
Gerhard Wollenhaupt	SED	
Fritz Wordel	FDGB	Berlin representative
Joseph Wujciak	CDU	
Alfred Wulf	CDU	on December 18, 1953, for the Abg. Kaczmarek moved up
Alfred Wunderlich	NDPD	
Elisabeth Zaisser	DFD	Member of the SED
Wilhelm Zaisser	SED	on February 17, 1954, announcement of his resignation
Eduard Zerdick	FDJ	Berlin representative
Harry Zeuge	SED	Berlin representative Resigned from office on April 21, 1954
Annerose Zibolsky	FDJ	
Gerhart Ziller	SED	moved up on August 25, 1953
Max Zimmermann	VdgB	
Kurt Zipper	LDPD	Berlin representative on September 5, 1952, revocation of the mandate
Arnold Zweig	Kulturbund	
