= Erwin Kramer =

East German politician (1902–1979)

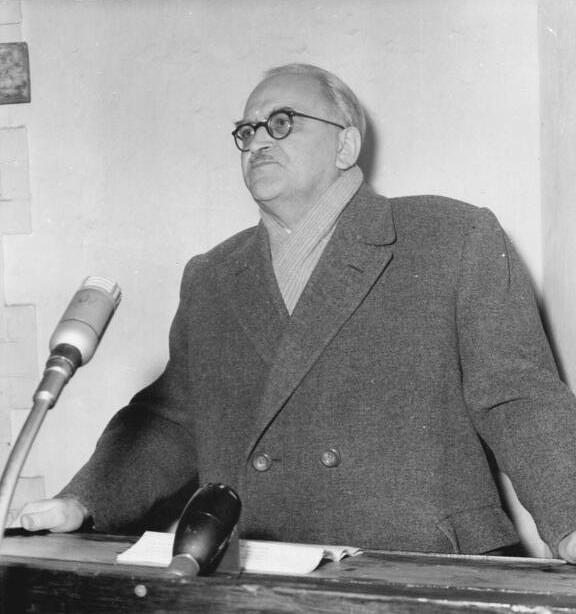

Minister of Transport
- In office 1954–1970
- Preceded by: Hans Reingruber
- Succeeded by: Otto Arndt

Member of the Volkskammer
- In office 1958 – 1979

General Director of the Deutsche Reichsbahn
- In office 1950 – 1970
- Preceded by: Willi Kreikemeyer
- Succeeded by: Otto Arndt

Personal details
- Born: 22 August 1902 Schneidemühl, German Empire
- Died: 10 November 1979 (aged 77) East Berlin, East Germany
- Party: KPD; SED
- Occupation: Politician

Military service
- Allegiance: (Spain) Second Spanish Republic
- Branch/service: International Brigades
- Years of service: 1937 – 1938
- Wars: Spanish Civil War

Erwin Kramer (22 August 1902 – 10 November 1979) was an East German politician who served as both Minister of Transportation and General Director of the Deutsche Reichsbahn.

Kramer was born in Schneidemühl (Province of Posen) (today Piła, Poland), where he grew up. After a traineeship at the Reichsbahnausbessungswerk Schneidemühl he studied electrical engineering and railroadsciences at the Technische Hochschule in Charlottenburg (now Technische Universität Berlin). He joined the Young Communist League of Germany in 1919, the Red Student's Aide in 1924-27 and the Communist Party of Germany in 1929. In 1930-32 Kramer worked as a workmaster for the Reichsbahn administration of Berlin.

In 1932 Kramer emigrated to the Soviet Union and worked at the "Central Research Institute of Transportation" in Moscow. In 1937 he passed a course in "Military Tactics" at the Red Army's military school at Tambov and fought as a member of the XI. International Brigades in the Spanish Civil War.

In 1939 he was interned in a French camp at Saint-Cyprien, Pyrénées-Orientales and returned to the Soviet Union, where he worked for the German desk of Radio Moscow. After the German attack on the Soviet Union he, together with other German communist emigrants, was sent to Samara (Kuybyshev) in October 1941.

After World War II Kramer returned to the Soviet Occupation Zone of Germany and joined the Socialist Unity Party of Germany (SED) in 1946. He became the head of the machinery technical branch of the German Economic Commission (Deutsche Wirtschaftskommission—DWK), the central economical administration of the Soviet Zone, and Deputy President of the Reichsbahn administration Berlin in 1946. In 1949 Kramer became the Deputy Director and in 1950 General Director of the Reichsbahn (until 1970), in 1953 Vice Minister of Transportation and 1954 Minister of Transportation (until 1970).

Kramer was a member of the Central Committee of the SED (1954–1970) and member of the Volkskammer (1958–1979).

Kramer died in 1979 in East Berlin.
