= Otto Arndt =

German politician

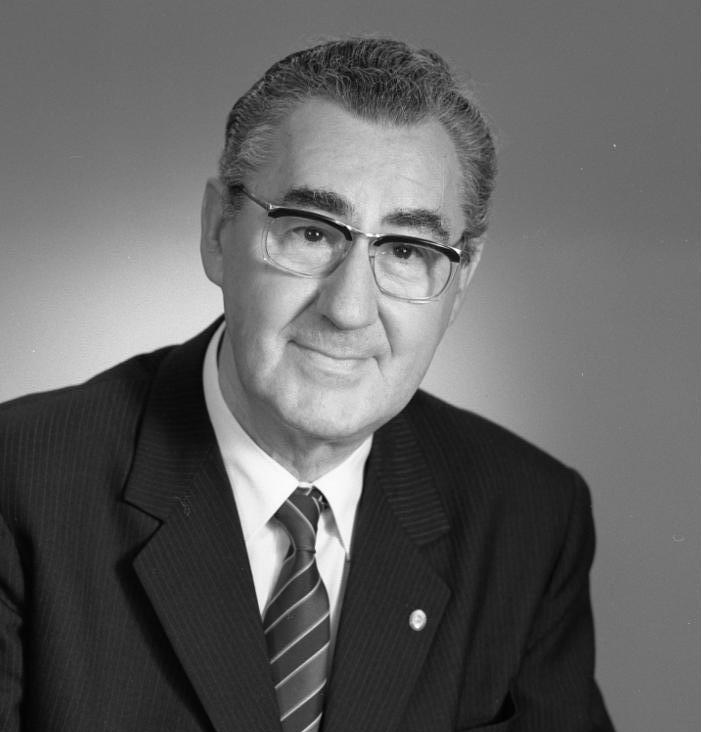
- Arndt in 1986

Minister for Transport
- In office 14 December 1970 – 18 November 1989
- Chairman of the Council of Ministers: Willi Stoph; Horst Sindermann; Willi Stoph
- First Deputy: Heino Weiprecht; Volkmar Winkler; Heinz Schmidt
- Preceded by: Erwin Kramer
- Succeeded by: Heinrich Scholz

General Director of the Deutsche Reichsbahn
- In office 16 December 1970 – November 1989
- First Deputy: Günther Knobloch; Heinz Schmidt; Herbert Keddi
- Preceded by: Erwin Kramer
- Succeeded by: Herbert Keddi

President of the Reichsbahndirektion Berlin
- In office 2 August 1961 – 14 February 1964
- Preceded by: Heinz Gebhardt
- Succeeded by: Günter Stuhr
Volkskammer
Member of the Volkskammer for Heiligenstadt, Mühlhausen, Worbis
In office 29 October 1976 – 5 April 1990
Preceded by	Luise Ermisch
Succeeded by	Constituency abolished

Personal details
- Born: 19 July 1920 Aschersleben, Province of Saxony, Free State of Prussia, Weimar Republic (now Saxony-Anhalt, Germany)
- Died: 3 February 1992 (aged 71)
- Party: Socialist Unity Party (1946–1989)
- Education: "Karl Marx" Party Academy; Zentralinstitut für sozialistische Wirtschaftsführung beim ZK der SED
- Occupation: Politician; Railwayman
- Awards: Patriotic Order of Merit, 1st class; Banner of Labor; Hero of Labour
- Central institution membership: 1975–1989: Full member, Central Committee; 1971–1975: Candidate member, Central Committee; Other offices held: 1964–1970: Deputy Minister, Ministry for Transport; 1953–1960: Vice President, Reichsbahndirektion Halle; 1951–1953: Vice President, Reichsbahndirektion Dresden

Otto Arndt (19 July 1920 – 3 February 1992) was an East German politician who served as minister of transport and General Director of the Deutsche Reichsbahn from 1970 until 1989.

== Biography ==
The son of a locomotive driver, Arndt was born in Aschersleben in 1920 and was trained as a locksmith. He served in the Luftwaffe during World War II with the rank of Obergefreiter. After the war, he trained to become a railway inspector and began his career in the Reichsbahn. Arndt was also very politically active and was a founding member of the Socialist Unity Party in the newly created German Democratic Republic.

In 1970, Arndt succeeded Erwin Kramer as Minister of Transport and Director of the Deutsche Reichsbahn and served in those capacities until he resigned alongside other government ministers in November 1989. He was also a member of the Volkskammer until March 1990.

== See also ==
- Council of Ministers of East Germany
- Transport in the German Democratic Republic
