= Mitteldeutsche Neueste Nachrichten =

Daily newspaper in East Germany (1952–1990)

- Type: Daily newspaper
- Owner: National-Demokratische Partei Deutschlands
- Publisher: Verlag der Nation
- Founded: July 1952
- Ceased publication: 26 February 1990
- Language: German
- Headquarters: Leipzig
- OCLC number: 632173663

Mitteldeutsche Neueste Nachrichten (Central German Latest News) was a German language regional daily newspaper which was based in Leipzig, East Germany. The paper existed between July 1952 and 26 February 1990. Its subtitle was Tageszeitung für Sachsen und Sachsen-Anhalt, and the publisher was Verlag der Nation. Later it was published by a company with the same name. It was an organ of the National-Demokratische Partei Deutschlands. The paper had editions for Halle and Magdeburg.

One of the editors was Johannes Caspar. The last editor was Rainer Duclaud.
