= Günter Stempel =

German politician (1908–1981)

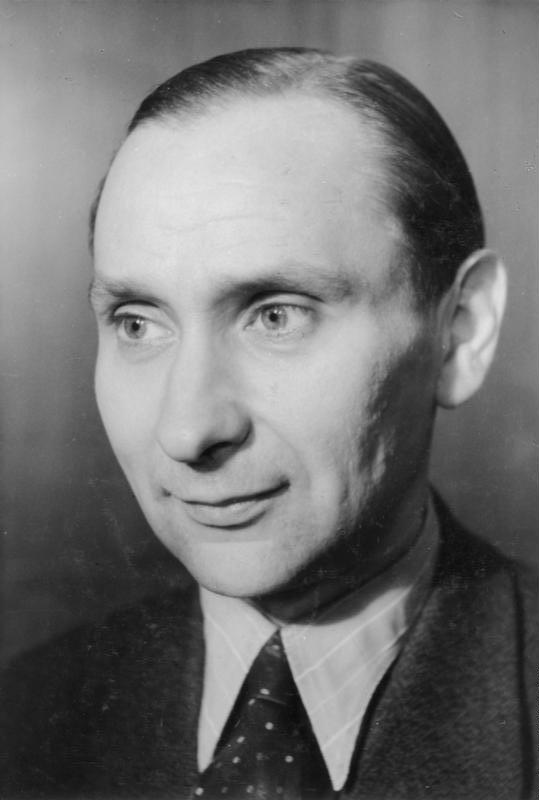
- Günter Stempel
- Born: 17 November 1908; Breslau, Germany
- Died: 22 October 1981 (aged 72); Celle, West Germany
- Occupations: Lawyer and politician
- Political party: LDPD

Günter Stempel (17 November 1908 – 22 October 1981) was a German politician (LDPD). He was involved in the formation of the German Democratic Republic (GDR), despite which he was a victim of political repression in both the GDR and the USSR.

== Life ==
Stempel was born in Breslau (now Wrocław, Poland). His father was a medical doctor. He studied law, passing his first level national law exams in 1933. He was unable to progress to the next stage academically by studying for a doctorate in law because he did not wish to become a member of the country's ruling NSDAP (Nazi party). He was nevertheless able to work in a Berlin law firm between 1933 and 1939. During World War II Stempel became the legal counsel to businesses critical to the war effort, and he was not conscripted for military service.

At the end of the war, Stempel joined the Liberal Democratic Party (LDPD (Liberal-Demokratische Partei Deutschlands)), and in September 1945 he was appointed the party's Organisation Secretary, serving from 1948 to 1950 as the LDPD's general secretary. From May 1945, the central part of Germany became administered as the Soviet occupation zone. For Stempel it was the Liberal Democrats' task "to gather together and look after the middle class elements in the Soviet zone of influence."

In 1949 he was a member of the German People's Council, which had been established the previous year in the Soviet occupation zone. This was redesignated in October 1949 as the Provisional People's Chamber (national legislature) at the same time as the occupation zone itself was redesignated as the German Democratic Republic, a separate Soviet-sponsored German state to the west of the Oder-Neisse line and divided politically (and, increasingly, physically) from what had been the post-war occupation zones controlled by the Americans, British and French armies. By this time the contentious merger that in April 1946 created the Socialist Unity Party (SED/Sozialistische Einheitspartei Deutschlands) had created many of the preconditions for a return to one-party dictatorship. However, whereas the Hitler government had simply banned opposition political parties, the new government in East Germany pursued the same outcomes by creating a power structure that merely controlled them. Opposition parties naturally resisted control by the SED, and it was the resulting tensions that provide the context for the rest of Stempel's political career.

An element of the new constitutional arrangements was the "single list voting system" whereby the ruling SED party drew up list of candidates representing each of the political parties and other groups to be represented in the Provisional People's Chamber (national legislature). Voters would be presented with the list and invited to vote for it or against it, by placing their voting paper in one of two well separated ballot boxes in the polling station, while watched by election officials. The single list voting system would succeed brilliantly. Turn-out was unfailingly high, and in subsequent East German elections prior to 1990 the ruling party's candidate list was never supported by fewer than 99% of those voting. Similarly impressive results were achieved in regional elections. However, Stempel voted against the Election Law which established the system and on 8 August 1950 he was arrested by officers of the newly established Ministry for State Security. He was handed over to the Soviet secret police and deported to Siberia. The Liberal Democratic Party leadership had become increasingly split between those prepared, if grudgingly, to go along with East Germany's constitutional arrangements, and those uncompromising and vociferous in their opposition. Stempel had been prominent among the latter and on 6 September 1950 he was excluded from the party, which some reports at the time were able to present as a result of internal party rivalries. He was succeeded as party General Secretary by Herbert Täschner who took a less confrontational approach to the new constitutional arrangements.

On 7 January 1952 Stempel faced a Soviet military tribunal which sentenced him to 25 years of forced labour, citing his "agent and espionage activities" ("Agenten- u. Spionagetätigkeit"). In April he was transferred to the infamous Soviet labour camp at Vorkuta. Here he was closely interrogated about his relationship with the Liberal Party leader, Karl Hamann. Hamann had been in government in the German Democratic Republic as a Minister for Trade and Supply: he had been arrested and accused of sabotaging supplies ("Sabotage der Versorgung"). In December 1953 Stempel was returned from Siberia to the German Democratic Republic on a train that was ironically known as the "Grotewohl Express" (Otto Grotewohl was the prime minister of the German Democratic Republic at the time). In May 1954 Stempel was required to testify at a show trial against Hamann: it may or may not have been a comment on the quality of his testimony that in August 1954 he was sent back to the Vorkuta labour camp. At some stage he refused to work and was transferred to another Soviet prison-camp.

In December 1955 he was one in a group of detainees handed over by the Soviets to the East German authorities at Frankfurt (Oder) which, following border changes mandated ten years earlier, had become a crossing point between the German Democratic Republic and Poland. However, in view of his official status, which was given as "non-amnestied war criminal", he was not immediately released. Sources comment on the contrast between the "war criminal" official status accorded him by the Soviet authorities in 1955, and the career damage Stempel sustained from his refusal to join the Nazi Party between 1933 and 1945.

On 28 April 1956 Stempel was released from the Bautzen penitentiary. He was able to flee to West Berlin where he obtained clerical work. From West Berlin, in collaboration with West Germany's Justice Minister, Thomas Dehler, he campaigned for the release of Karl Hamann. The campaign succeeded: Hamann was released from prison in October 1956 and permitted to flee to West Germany in May 1957.

In consequence of his treatment in the Soviet Union, Stempel never fully recovered physically. He died in Celle on 22 October 1981.
