= Jonny Löhr =

German politician (1899–1967)

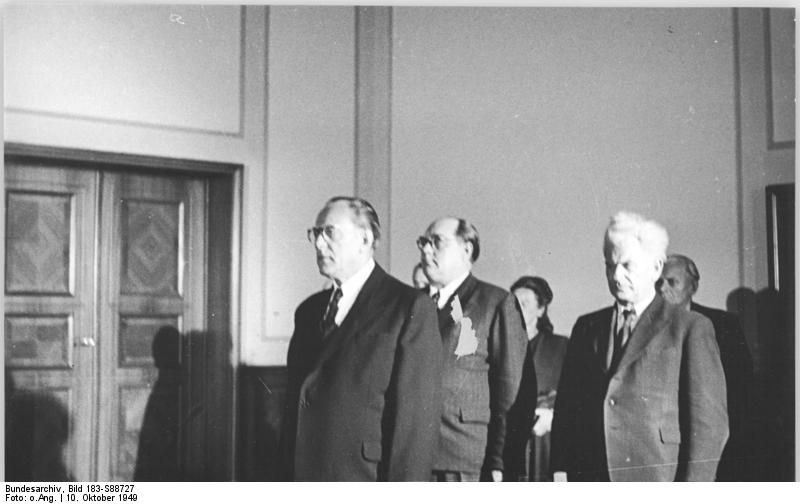
- Jonny Löhr (middle), 10 October 1949

Member of the Volkskammer
- In office 1954–1967

Ambassador of the German Democratic Republic to Romania
- In office 1950–1951
- Preceded by: position established
- Succeeded by: Georg Ulrich Handke

Personal details
- Born: Jonni Cäsar Burmeister; 20 February 1889 Hamburg, German Empire
- Died: 15 July 1967 (aged 68) Berlin, East Germany
- Resting place: Zentralfriedhof Friedrichsfelde
- Party: National Democratic Party of Germany (1948–); Socialist Unity Party of Germany (1946–1948); Communist Party of Germany (1922–1946)
- Other political affiliations: Romanian Communist Party (1930s–1941)
- Spouse: Friedel Behrendt
- Education: International Lenin School
- Awards: Patriotic Order of Merit, in gold (1964); Banner of Labor (1959); Ernst Moritz Arndt Medal (1957); Star of the People's Republic of Romania (1956); Medal for “Liberation from the Fascist Yoke” (1956); Patriotic Order of Merit, in silver (1955)
- Military Service
- Allegiance: German Empire
- Branch: Imperial German Army
- Conflicts: First World War

Jonny Löhr (20 February 1899 – 15 July 1967) was a German politician and diplomat. He was the first ambassador of the German Democratic Republic to Romania from 1950 to 1951.

== Life ==
Jonny Löhr was born into a working-class family in Hamburg on 20 February 1899. After completing elementary school, he trained as a locksmith from 1913 to 1916. In 1917, he was conscripted for military service in the First World War. The war influenced his political views, and he joined the Young Communist League of Germany (KJVD) after completing his military service. In 1922, he joined the Communist Party of Germany. Löhr married Friedel Behrendt in 1924. By 1928, he had completed training as an engineer in Leipzig. He then studied at the International Lenin School in Moscow. During his studies in Moscow, he became a citizen of the Soviet Union. He was then assigned by the Comintern to work in Romania to support the communist movement there. In October 1930, Löhr was arrested by Romanian authorities on charges of treason. He was sentenced to ten years imprisonment in June 1931. He served prison time in Aiud and also in Doftana prison; where he would meet Gheorghe Gheorghiu-Dej and other prominent Romanian communists. During his imprisonment he became a member of the Romanian Communist Party and remained a member until 1941. After his release from prison in 1941, Löhr travelled to Moldova, which had recently been annexed by the Soviet Union from Romania. There he worked as an engineer in the city of Chișinău. When Nazi Germany invaded the Soviet Union, Löhr was recruited by the NKVD to work as a political instructor. In this role he worked with the National Committee for a Free Germany and provided political education to German prisoners of war.

After the conclusion of the Second World War, Löhr returned to Germany in June 1945. He then became a member of the Socialist Unity Party of Germany after it was formed in 1946. Between 1946 and 1950, he held a series of government jobs managing East German industrial development. In June 1948, he was a founding member of the National Democratic Party of Germany (NDPD). On 1 April 1950, he was appointed as the first ambassador of the German Democratic Republic to Romania. However, in March 1951, after only ten months as ambassador Löhr was recalled at the request of the Romanian government for alleged misconduct. He was replaced by Georg Ulrich Handke. Löhr was elected to the Volkskammer in the 1954 election as a member of the NDPD. He would remain a member of the Volkskammer until his death. Löhr died on 15 July 1967, in Berlin.

== Awards ==
- 1964 Patriotic Order of Merit, in Gold
- 1959 Banner of Labor
- 1957 Ernst Moritz Arndt Medal
- 1956 Star of the People's Republic of Romania
- 1956 Medal for “Liberation from the Fascist Yoke”
- 1955 Patriotic Order of Merit, in Silver
