= Roman Chwalek =

German trade unionist and politician (1898–1974)

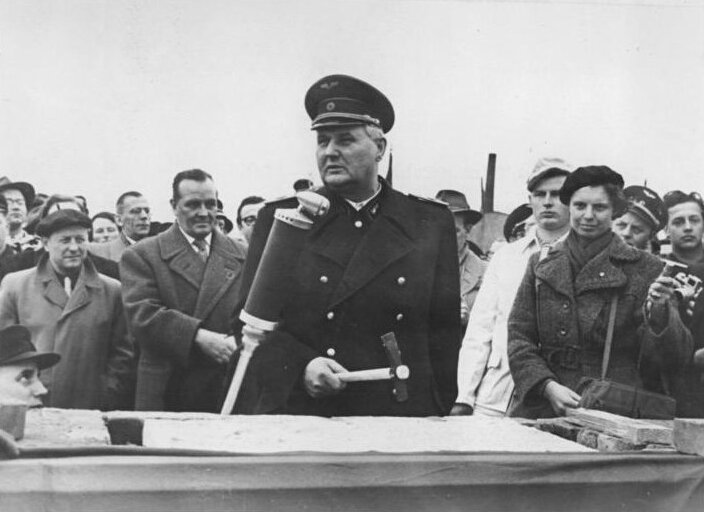

Minister of Railways
- In office April 1953 – November 1954
- Prime Minister: Otto Grotewohl
- Preceded by: Hans Reingruber
- Succeeded by: Erwin Kramer

Minister of Labor
- In office November 1950 – April 1953
- Prime Minister: Otto Grotewohl
- Preceded by: Luitpold Steidle
- Succeeded by: Friedrich Macher

Personal details
- Born: 24 July 1898 Woinowitz, Province of Silesia, Prussia, German Empire
- Died: 27 November 1974 (aged 76) East Berlin, East Germany
- Resting place: Friedrichsfelde Central Cemetery, East Berlin
- Party: Independent Social Democratic Party of Germany; Communist Party of Germany; Socialist Unity Party of Germany

Roman Chwalek (24 July 1898 – 27 November 1974) was a trade unionist and socialist politician who held various cabinet posts in East Germany.

== Biography ==
Chwalek was born in Woinowitz, in the Prussian Province of Silesia, on 24 July 1898. He fought in World War I and after the war he worked in trade unions. He became a member of the Independent Social Democratic Party of Germany in 1919 and then joined the Communist Party of Germany in 1920. He was arrested on 1 September 1933 and imprisoned for three years and after serving his sentence in the Luckau penitentiary, he was transferred to the Sachsenhausen concentration camp. In 1939 he was released from the camp. Until 1945 he worked as a locksmith in Neukölln, Berlin.

After World War II Chwalek became a member of the ruling party Socialist Unity Party of Germany. He was a cofounder of the Free German Trade Union Confederation during this period. From 1949 to 1954 Chwalek was a member of the East German Parliament. He was appointed minister for labor in November 1950 succeeding Luitpold Steidle in the post. Chwalek's term ended in April 1953 when Friedrich Macher was named as the minister for labor. Then he was appointed minister for railways in April 1953, replacing Hans Reingruber in the post. Chwalek served as minister for railways until November 1954 and was succeeded by Erwin Kramer in the post.

Chwalek died in East Berlin on 27 November 1974. He was buried in the Friedrichsfelde Central Cemetery.

Chwalek awarded the Patriotic Order of Merit in 1958 and in 1963 and was also the recipient of the Order of Karl Marx and the Banner of Labor both of which were awarded to him in 1968.
