= Iris Wittig =

German military pilot (1928–1978)

Iris Wittig (9 April 1928 – 30 September 1978) was a German military pilot. She was the first, and only, female fighter pilot in the East German Air Force.

== Biography ==
Wittig was born in Lengefeld on 9 April 1928. From 1935 to 1945 her father was imprisoned by the Nazi regime, and from 1944 her mother was incarcerated at Ravensbrück concentration camp. Wittig joined the Communist Party of Germany (KPD) at the age of fifteen, in December 1945, and was active in Free German Youth (FDJ), a youth political movement, from its foundation the following year. After Wittig completed high school, she worked as a tractor driver in Lengefeld, and continued with her activism. In 1950 she became deputy leader of the Volkskammer parliament.

Wittig wanted to do something more challenging than tractor driving or office work. She contacted General Inspector Heinz Kessler, whose mother had been in Ravensbrück with Wittig's mother. Through this personal connection, she was able to obtain a posting with the Volkspolizei (the national police force). She progressed to the rank of officer in 1953. She began flying and completed her training with a Soviet instructor on board a Mikoyan-Gurevich MiG-15 aircraft. In 1954, she had to cease flying jets as a result of a flying accident. Instead, she flew gliders and Yakovlev Yak-18s and in 1956 she became a flight instructor.

== Family ==
Wittig married a pilot, Hans Köhler, with whom she had two children.
