= Herbert Täschner =

German politician (1916–1984)

- Born: 7 July 1916; Dresden, Kingdom of Saxony, German Empire
- Died: 10 May 1984 (aged 67); Berlin, East Germany
- Occupation: Politician
- Political party: LDPD
- Spouse: Gertraude

Herbert Täschner (7 July 1916 – 10 May 1984) was a politician in the German Democratic Republic who later in his career became a publisher. Between 1950 and 1954 he served as General Secretary of the country's Liberal Democratic Party.

== Life ==
=== Early years ===
Täschner was born in Dresden, in the southern part of what was then central Germany, during the middle of the war. His father was an administrative worker. He attended school locally. His secondary school was a Handelsschule, intended to prepare pupils for careers in commerce and administration. On leaving school Täschner took administrative internships in Dresden, Pirna and Heidenau.

1937 was the year of his 21st birthday, and he was called up for National Labour Service. The next year he was conscripted into the army. By the time the war ended, in May 1945, he was a junior Non-commissioned officer and a prisoner of war. In 1946 Herbert Täschner returned home to what was now the Soviet occupation zone in what remained of Germany. The defeat of Nazism appeared to have marked the end of one-party government, and Täschner joined the Liberal Democratic Party, becoming a leading party activist in the party's so-called "Friedrich Naumann" group - effectively the party local leadership team - in Dresden. Between 1946 and 1949 he served as the party's district secretary, becoming in 1949 the party General Secretary (still based in Dresden) for the whole of Saxony.

=== Politics ===
The German Democratic Republic was founded in the former Soviet occupation zone in October 1949, but by that time the basis for a return to one-party government had already been created, under Soviet administration in April 1946 with the contentious merger of the old Communist Party with the Moderate-left SPD. One party government under Hitler had involved banning parties other than the Nazi Party. Under Ulbricht the ruling party sought to achieve a monopoly of power not by banning other parties but by controlling them. The LDPD was one of several parties and quasi-political mass movements grouped together into an organisational structure controlled by the ruling SED (party), and known as the Democratic Bloc (rebranded in 1950 as the National Front).

=== Rising to the top of the Liberal Democratic Party ===
During the later half of the 1940s the SED had worked hard to ensure its own electoral success, but it had not succeeded in winning every election. For 1950 new arrangements were set in place involving a "single list" electoral system. Voters were presented with a single list of candidates and were able to vote for or against the list. Voting against the list required a voter to use a separate ballot box under the surveillance of the election officials. The new system electoral system was a success: between 1950 and 1986 the SED always received more than 99% of the votes cast in general election. The so-called bloc parties were not wholly disenfranchised, however since along with certain mass movements they received a fixed quota of seats in the national legislature Volkskammer. Those objecting to the "single list" electoral system included politicians who had already vociferously objected to the "Bloc party" system, among them Günter Stempel who was the General Secretary of the Liberal Democratic party (LDPD). On 8 August 1950 Stempel was arrested for rejecting the "single list" voting system and on 6 September he was stripped of the party leadership. Seventeen months later he would be condemned to twenty-five years forced labour by a Soviet military tribunal. Herbert Täschner enjoyed relatively good relations with the SED (party) and with the recently created Ministry for State Security: this left him as the "strong man" of the LDPD. The Liberal Democrats held a party conference at the end of September 1952 at which they formally accepted the "Creation of Socialism" in the German Democratic Republic, and Täschner was mandated with exceptional powers to transform the party towards "democratic centralism". This in effect was the point at which the Liberal Democratic Party accepted its diminished status as an element within the National Front, and it was also the point at which Herbert Täschner became the party's General Secretary, On 20 November 1950 Täschner wrote from Berlin to Fritz Greuner of the regional party in Saxony, resigning from his position as regional party General Secretary, explaining that the heavy burden of his national party responsibilities made it impossible to continue also with the job in Saxony. He warmly thanked his colleagues in Saxony regarding their work together and commended his successor as regional Democratic Secretary, a man called Döring. Along with his post as party General Secreatary, between 1950 and 1954 Täschner was a member of the National Legislative assembly (Volkskammer).

=== Transforming the party ===
He remained party General Secretary for nearly four years, till May 1954. As party General Secretary, Täschner led the transformation of the Liberal Democratic Party into a de facto Leninist cadre party. In the view of a younger party colleague Wolfgang Schollwer, the position gave him almost unlimited control over the party apparatus, which he used ruthlessly, with powerful backing from the Soviet authorities, to purge the party of all its "reactionary elements". His most high-profile victim was his colleague, the leading Liberal Democrat Karl Hamann.

The early 1950s were a period of heightened political nervousness in the German Democratic Republic with a series of high-profile show trials and, in 1953, the uncompromising suppression of an insurrection. Within the Liberal Democratic party Täschner was the most prominent member of a four-man leadership collective, of which the other three were Johannes Dieckmann, Willi-Peter Konzok and Hans Loch. The party leadership maintained good relations with East Germany's ruling SED (party), but by 1954 they had become increasingly estranged from the rest of the party membership. The SED would have preferred for Herbert Täschner to have remained in his post as Liberal Democratic Party General Secretary, but he was nevertheless relieved of the position in May 1954. As one unsympathetic commentator pointed out at the time, the periodic sacrifice from among least loved of the party apparatchiks made the remaining comrades more docile. His successor as party General Secretary was Manfred Gerlach, still aged only 28, who took a less confrontational approach to the role, though there was little he could do to change the undemocratic character of the party.

=== After the nemesis ===
Täschner was fortunate in that his fall from grace came only after the death of Stalin, following which politics in Central Europe became a little less brutal. Whereas his predecessor had been sent to a Siberian labour camp, Täschner was found a job in publishing, initially, between 1954 and 1956, as director with the Thüringische Landeszeitung, at that time a state sanctioned newspaper of the Liberal Democratic Party, based in Weimar. From 1956 till 1962 he was a director of the GST (National Sports and Technology association) publishing section, and from 1962 till 1979 of a music publisher called Lied der Zeit. Towards the end of his life he was also entrusted with the leadership of an LDPD district team in Berlin-Friedrichshain.

Herbert Täschner died in Berlin a couple of months short of his 68th birthday.

== Awards and honours ==
- 1965: Patriotic Order of Merit in Bronze
- 1976: Patriotic Order of Merit in Silver
- Verdienstmedaille der DDR
- Ernst-Moritz-Arndt-Medaille
