= Herbert Warnke =

East German trade unionist and politician (1902–1975)

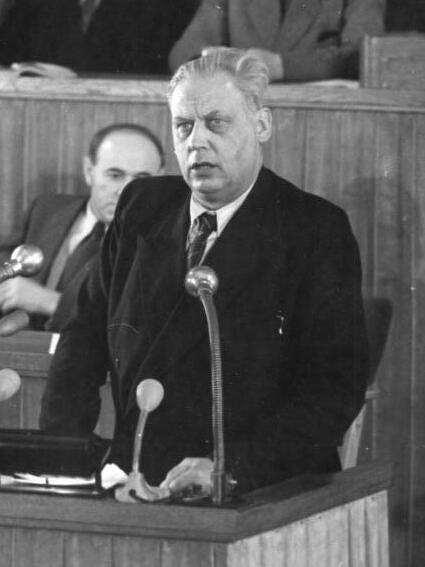
- Warnke in 1951

Chairman of the Free German Trade Union Federation
- In office 18 October 1948 – 26 March 1975
- Deputy: Alexander Starck; Rudolf Kirchner; Otto Lehmann; Walter Buchheim; Rolf Berger; Johanna Töpfer; Wolfgang Beyreuther
- Preceded by: Hans Jendretzky
- Succeeded by: Harry Tisch

Member of the Volkskammer
- In office 1949–1975

Member of the Reichstag
- In office 1932–1933

Personal details
- Born: 24 February 1902 Hamburg, German Empire
- Died: 26 March 1975 (aged 73) East Berlin, East Germany
- Party: KPD; SED
- Occupation: Politician
- Awards: Patriotic Order of Merit (1955); Order of Karl Marx (1962); Lenin Peace Prize (1967); Order of Lenin (1972)

Herbert Werner Kurt Warnke (24 February 1902 – 26 March 1975) was an East German trade unionist and politician who served as both Chairman of the Free German Trade Union Federation and a member of the Politburo of the Socialist Unity Party.

== Biography ==
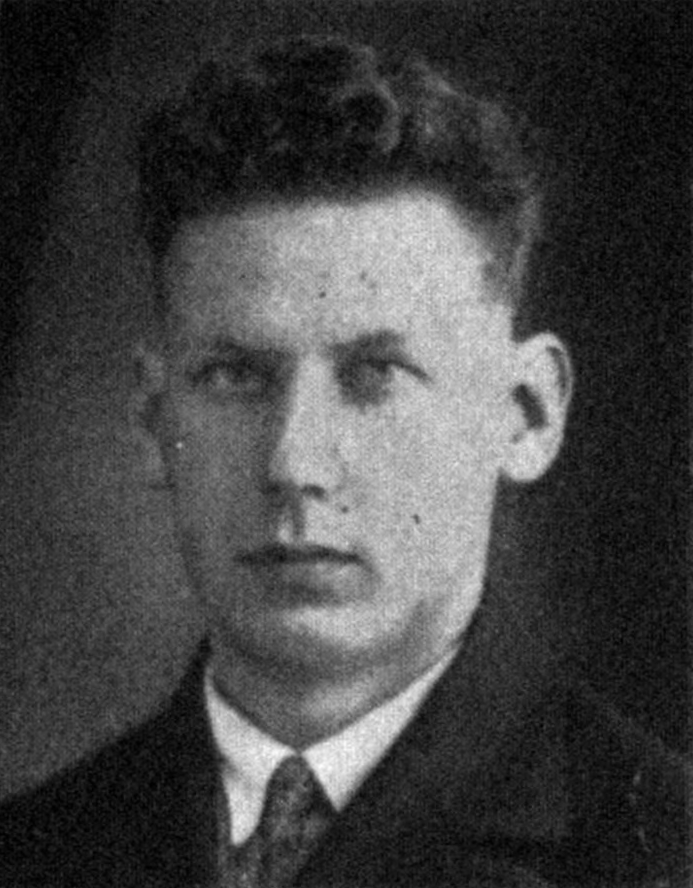
Warnke's official Reichstag portrait, 1932

Warnke was born in Hamburg on 24 February 1902 to a working-class family. He joined the Communist Party of Germany (KPD) in 1923 and became actively involved in trade union activism. In 1929, he was banned from the German Metal Workers' Union for subversion and then joined the Revolutionary Union Opposition. In 1932 he was elected to the Reichstag and held his seat until the Nazi seizure of power in 1933. Later that same year he became secretary of the Profintern in Saarbrücken and Paris and actively opposed the Nazis during the remainder of the Interwar period. In 1936, he moved via Denmark to Sweden. During World War II he remained there and worked with various organizations for exiled Germans. From 1939 to 1943, he was imprisoned for sabotage and espionage.

After the defeat of the Nazis, Warnke returned to Soviet-occupied Germany and helped found the Free German Trade Union Federation (FDGB). He succeeded Hans Jendretzky as First Chairman of the organization, serving from 1948 until his death in 1975. He was elected to the Volkskammer in 1949 and was also elected to the State Council of East Germany in 1971. Warnke died in East Berlin on 26 March 1975.

Herbert Warnke was a passionate fan of 1. FC Union Berlin.
