= Wilhelm Bachem =

German politician

- Born: 19 March 1903; Mülheim, Rhine Province, German Empire
- Died: 4 October 1962 (aged 59)
- Occupation: Politician
- Political party: DDP (till 1930); DStP (1930-1933); CDU (from 1945)
- Spouse: Ruth _____

Wilhelm Bachem (born Mülheim 19 March 1903; died 4 October 1962) was a German politician. Between 1947 and 1950 he was the Minister for Transport in Thuringia. In 1950, for a few months, he was a minister in the East German national government.

In January 1951 he fled to the west, after which he took no further part in public life.

== Life ==
Bachem was born in Germany's Ruhr region. He trained as a Pharmacist, and until 1938, worked as an independent Pharmacist, initially at his father's Drugstore in Cologne. Entrepreneurial ambition was apparent in the sign that he fixed above the door at the front of the shop:

"Ob Elefant, ob Wasserfloh, Alles gibt's in Bachems Zoo!"
("Whether elephant or water flea, there's everything in Bachem's zoo)

However, in 1935 the business at Hindenburgstraße 3 went bankrupt. Bachem's reacted to business failure by becoming a socialist: the socialism on offer at this time came with the pre-fix "National".

Earlier Bachem was a member of the German Democratic Party (DDP / Deutsche Demokratische Partei) which in 1930 mutated into the German State Party DStP / Deutsche Staatspartei (DStP) before dissolving itself in 1933. In 1930 Bachem stood for a seat in the Reichstag the 1930 election, representing the "Düsseldorf East & West" electoral district, but the election campaign in Düsseldorf was marred by violence and Bechem's party achieved only 3.8% of the national vote: Bachem himself was not elected. After the Nazi seizure of power at the start of 1933 he became a member of Hühnlein's National Socialist Motor Corps (NSKK / Nationalsozialistisches Kraftfahrkorps). Motorised transport became a recurring theme in his career from then on.

As with many NSKK members, the outbreak of war in 1939 found Bachem in the army. However, during 1940 he was released from military service due to illness. He spent the rest of the war in business, setting up a herbal medicine wholesaler and becoming the owner of a trucking company.

In 1945 Wilhelm Bachem joined another political party, the newly formed CDU (Christian Democratic Union / Christlich-Demokratische Union Deutschlands). By this time he had ended up in Thuringia which was part of the Soviet occupation zone of post war Germany. During the later 1940s the Soviet zone mutated into the German Democratic Republic and the CDU was purged of members thinking of themselves as part of the wider German CDU. In East Germany the CDU became instead part of the National Front in East Germany, a grouping of notionally independent political parties controlled by East Germany's ruling SED. However, outside the nation building team that arrived from Moscow at the end of March 1945, plans for these developments were not widely known nor, at first, recognised. In 1946 Bachem was appointed to the position of Executive Director of the CDU regional office for Thuringia. In 1947 he achieved Ministerial director rank as head of the Traffic department in the regional ministry for the Economy, Work and Transport. In October 1947 Bachem himself became Minister of Transport in Thuringia, a position he would retain till February 1950. Along with the ministerial appointment went membership of the recently created and, at this time, highly influential German Economic Commission, as well as of the standing committee of the German People's Congress. From 1948 till 1950 he was a member of the CDU main committee and, briefly, was also chairman of the party's central audit committee. In 1949 he became deputy chairman of the CDU National Association in East Berlin, and from 1950 he was a member of the Political committee of the party's main committee. In 1949/50 he was a member of the German People's Council, later becoming a member of the country's first People's Chamber. Between March and November 1950 Wilhelm Bachem was the Secretary of State for Transport for East Germany.

In January 1951 Bachem crossed into West Berlin and fled to West Germany, where he no longer pursued any political role. In the west he was employed as a businessman, and became the owner of a caravan business. Wilhelm Bachem died in October 1962.
