= Ottomar Geschke =

German politician (1882–1957)

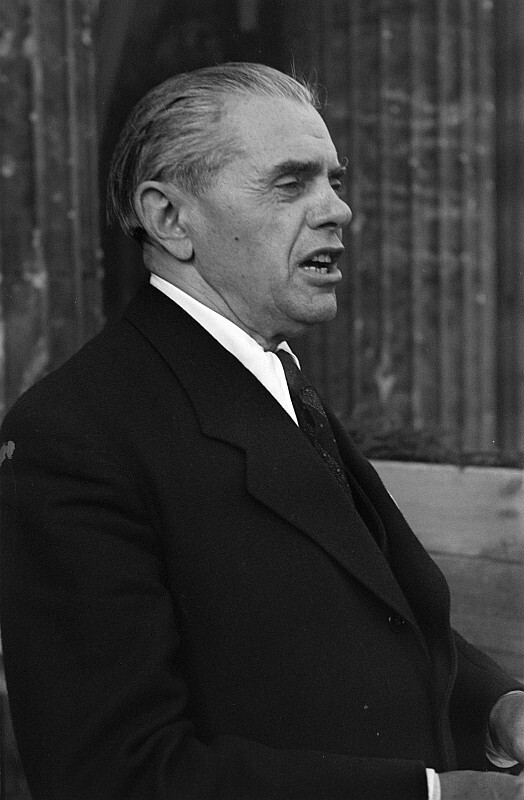
- Geschke speaking at a Victims of Fascism rally in Berlin, September 1946

Member of the Volkskammer for Berlin
- In office 18 March 1948 – 17 May 1957
- Preceded by: Constituency established
- Succeeded by: Multi-member district

Member of the Reichstag for Reichswahlvorschlag
- In office 5 January 1925 – 31 July 1932
- Preceded by: Multi-member district
- Succeeded by: Multi-member district

Member of the Landtag of Prussia for Berlin
- In office 10 March 1921 – 5 January 1925
- Preceded by: Multi-member district
- Succeeded by: Multi-member district

Personal details
- Born: 16 November 1882 Fürstenwalde, Province of Brandenburg, Kingdom of Prussia, German Empire
- Died: 17 May 1957 (aged 74) East Berlin, East Germany
- Resting place: Zentralfriedhof Friedrichsfelde
- Party: SPD (1910–1917); USPD (1917–1919); KPD (1919–1946); SED (after 1946)
- Other political affiliations: Spartacus League (1917–1918)
- Occupation: Politician; Trade Unionist; Locksmith

Military service
- Allegiance: German Empire; Revolutionaries; Revolutionaries
- Branch/service: Imperial German Army; Spartacus League; Antimilitärischer Apparat
- Years of service: 1916–1918; 1919; 1923
- Battles/wars: World War I Spartacist Uprising; German October
- Central institution membership: 1925–1929: Full member, KPD Politburo; 1923–1935, 1945–1946: Full member, KPD Central Committee (Note: Zentrale until 1925); 1921–1925: Member, KPD Central Commission; Other offices held: 1947–1953: Chairman, Association of Persecutees of the Nazi Regime; 1946–1949: Deputy Speaker, Berlin City Council; 1946–1951: Member, Berlin City Council

Ottomar Georg Alexander Geschke (16 November 1882 – 17 May 1957) was a German politician, trade unionist and anti-Nazi activist.

== Biography ==
Geschke was born into a blacksmith's family. After receiving an elementary education he trained as a locksmith and worked in Berlin. From 1908 he participated in the labor movement by joining the German Metal Workers' Union. In 1910, Geschke joined the SPD and in 1917, due to disagreement on the issue of providing military loans, he moved to the USPD. During the November Revolution of 1918 he was elected a member of the Berlin Workers' and Soldiers' Council.

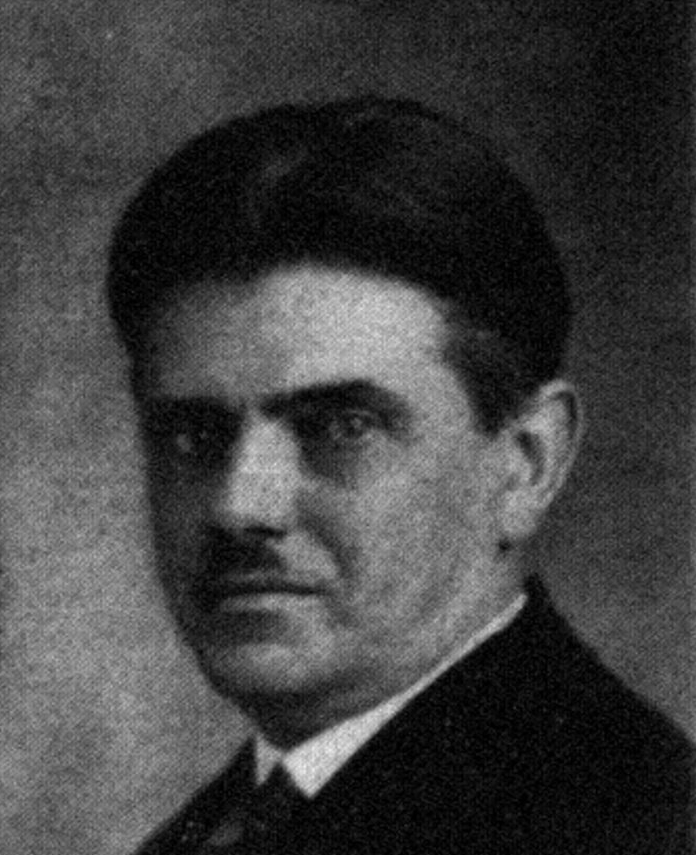
Geschke's official Reichstag portrait, 1930

Geschke was a member of the Spartacus League and joined the Communist Party of Germany (KPD) in 1919. That year, he fought in the Spartacist uprising, for which he was imprisoned from June to November 1919. In 1920 he worked in the KPD's trade union department, and in 1923 he was elected to the Central Committee of the KPD as a representative of the left wing. That same year, he served in the party's military apparatus during preparations for the German October. From 1925 he was a member of the Central Committee and the Politburo of the party. He was a member of the Executive Bureau of the Red International of Trade Unions and from 1924 was a member of the Executive Committee of the Comintern. From 1921 to 1924 Geschke was elected to the Prussian Landtag. In the elections of 1924 he was elected to the Reichstag and retained his mandate until July 1932. Geschke did not support party leader Ernst Thälmann during the Wittorf Affair and was sidelined in the party as a result.

For his anti-fascist activities, Geschke was repeatedly arrested and imprisoned in prisons and concentration camps. After the Nazis came to power in 1933, Geschke was arrested and held in the Lichtenburg, Sonnenburg and Buchenwald concentration camps. In 1940 he was released from prison and lived in Köslin under police surveillance.

After the assassination attempt on Hitler on July 20, 1944, Geschke was again arrested and placed in the Sachsenhausen concentration camp. In May 1945 he was liberated by the allied forces.

After the Second World War, Geschke continued to be involved in politics and from May 19, 1945, to January 8, 1947, he worked in the magistrate of Greater Berlin, headed by Arthur Werner as a social adviser. In April 1946, Geschke joined the Socialist Unity Party (SED) and from 1946 to 1953 was on the board of the party's branch in Berlin. From 1947 to 1953 he was chairman of the Union of Persecutees of the Nazi Regime and was elected from this organization to the Volkskammer of the GDR. In 1953 he was elected to the presidium of the Committee of Anti-Fascist Resistance Fighters.

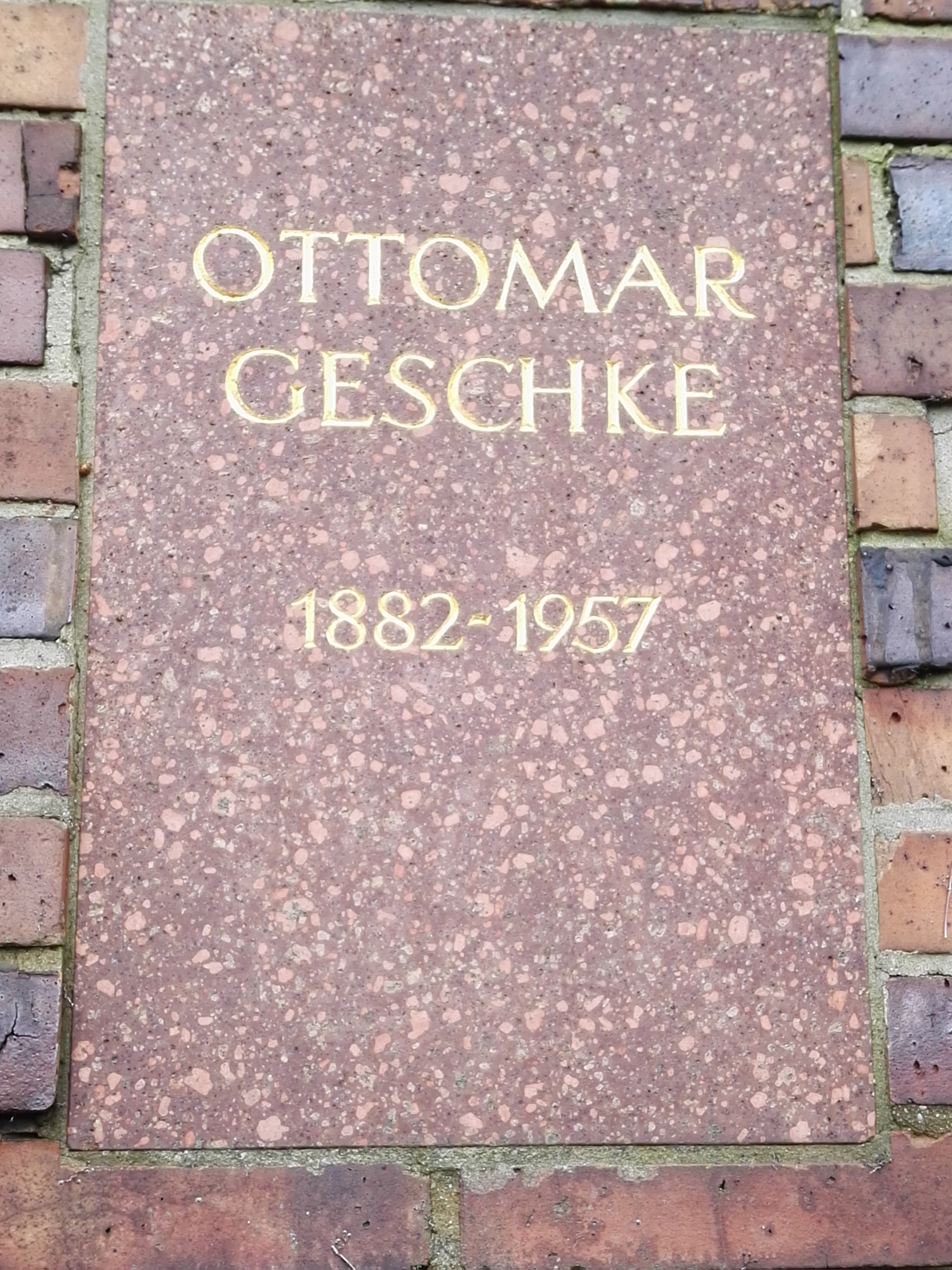
Grave of Ottomar Geschke

He was buried in the Memorial of the Socialists at the Friedrichsfelde Central Cemetery in Berlin.
