= Transport in the German Democratic Republic =

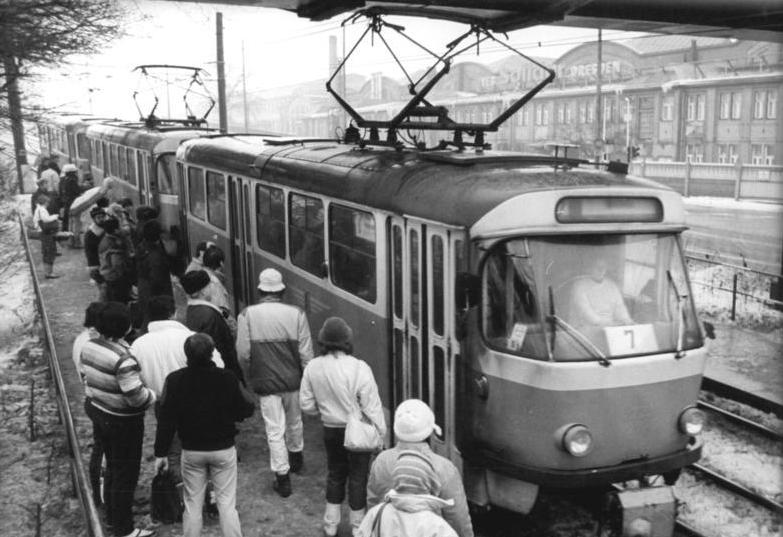
Dresden, 1987

Transportation policy in the German Democratic Republic, also known as East Germany, was the responsibility of the Ministry for Transport. The East German ministry managed the railway system, car manufacturing and airlines.

== See also ==
- Trabant
- Barkas (van manufacturer)
- Wartburg (car)
