= Johannes Stroux =

German classicist and scholar of Roman law (1886–1954)

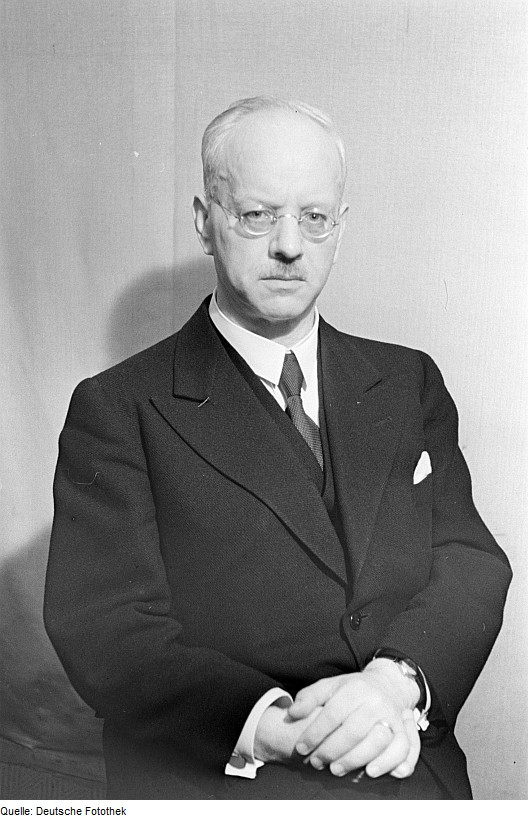
- Born: Johannes Franz Stroux; 25 August 1886; Haguenau, Alsace-Lorraine, German Empire
- Died: 25 August 1954 (aged 68)
- Years active: 20th century

Academic background
- Education: University of Strasbourg; University of Göttingen

Academic work
- Discipline: Classicist
- Institutions: University of Basel; Kiel University; University of Jena; Ludwig-Maximilians-Universität München; Friedrich Wilhelm University of Berlin

Johannes Stroux (25 August 1886 – 25 August 1954) was a German classicist, scholar of Roman law and organizer of scientific projects and organizations. In 1945, he became rector of the Friedrich Wilhelm University of Berlin and president of the Berlin Academy of Science.

== Life and work ==
Stroux was born in Haguenau in Alsace-Lorraine, which at this time belonged to the German Empire. He studied at the University of Strasbourg and the University of Göttingen. In 1914, he became professor at the University of Basel (Switzerland), 1922 at Kiel University, 1923 at the University of Jena and 1924 at the Ludwig-Maximilians-Universität München. In 1935, he moved to the Friedrich Wilhelm University of Berlin as successor of Eduard Norden. In 1937, he became a member of the Prussian Academy of Science. From 1945 to 1947, he acted as rector of the Friedrich Wilhelm University of Berlin, the later Humboldt-University. Stroux replaced his predecessor Eduard Spranger as acting rector in October 1945, when control of the university was shifted from the municipal administration of Berlin (Magistrat) to the newly created East-German educational administration (DZV), which was itself controlled by the Soviet Military Administration in Germany (SMAD). On 29. January 1946 Stroux reopened the Friedrich Wilhelm University of Berlin, which was closed because of war damages on buildings, necessary reorganizations and denazification, which was demanded be the Allies. He acted as elected rector until 1947.

From 1945 to 1951, Stroux was president of the German Academy of Sciences at Berlin (before 1946 called Preussische Akademie der Wissenschaften, then Deutsche Akademie der Wissenschaften zu Berlin).

== Organization of science ==
In different positions, Stroux was a part of the international long-term project Thesaurus Linguae Latinae (TLL), the most comprehensive dictionary of the Latin language as well as other similar projects. From 1934 to 1949, Stroux was president of the commission of the German academies for the TLL.

Stroux became 1939 representative of the German academies for the Union Académique Internationale (UAI) and was in same year elected as vicepresident of the UAI.

== Political activity ==
As one of vice presidents of the East-German Kulturbund Stroux became a member of the parliament of the GDR, the People's Chamber.

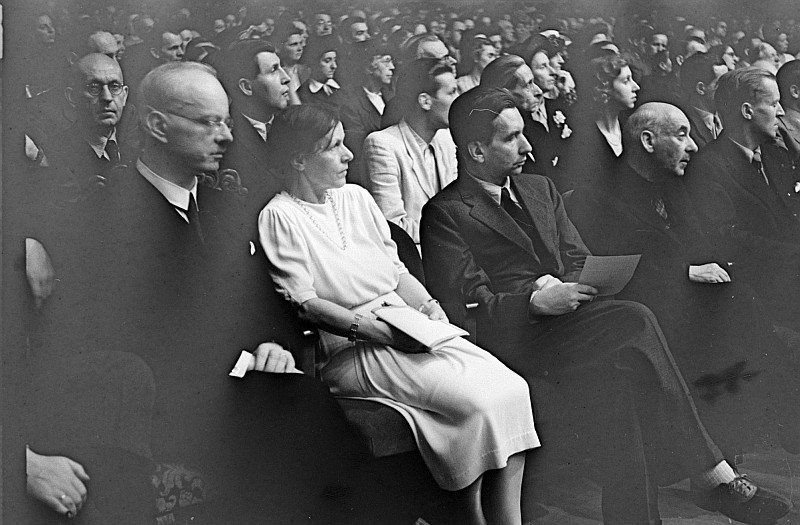
Johannes Stroux (left) with Victor Klemperer (right) at a meeting of the Kulturbund July 1946

== Scientific work ==
Stroux published scientific works in the field of Latin language and literature, Roman law, papyrology and epigraphy. One of his most successful works was a book with the title summum ius summum iniuria. It was about the introduction of the concept of equity into Roman Law from Greece through the school of rhetoric.

From 1929 until 1954, he edited the de:Philologus, an academic journal for classical philology, existing from 1848 until today. In this journal Stroux published also many of his own articles. In the 20th he was one of the editors of the journal Gnomon and later editor of the more popular journal de:Die Antike.

== Scientific networking ==
In the intellectual discussion circle Berliner Mittwochsgesellschaft (1863–1944), member since 1937, he met with scientists like Werner Heisenberg, Ferdinand Sauerbruch, Eugen Fischer and Eduard Spranger and also with some of the people, who planned to overthrow the NS-regime in the 20 July plot of 1944: Johannes Popitz, Ulrich von Hassell, Jens Jessen and General Ludwig Beck.

== Memberships and merits ==
In 1950, Stroux was awarded the National Prize of East Germany. and the Order of Polonia Restituta, 1954 the Patriotic Order of Merit of the GDR. He was elected as member of the Bavarian Academy of Sciences and Humanities (1929) and 1930 elected as corresponding member of the German Archaeological Institute, the Academia dei Lincei in Rome and the Kungl. Humanistiska Vetenskapssamfundet Lund. In 1937, he became member of the Prussian Academy of Sciences and the Strassburger wissenschaftliche Gesellschaft, 1954 member of the Polish Academy of Sciences.

== Major works ==
- De Theophrasti Virtutibus Dicendi. Dissertationsschrift. Teubner, Leipzig 1912.
- Handschriftliche Studien zu Cicero De oratore. Die Rekonstruktion der Handschrift von Lodi. Teubner, Leipzig 1921.
- Summum ius summa iniuria: Ein Kapitel aus der Geschichte der interpretatio iuris. Teubner, Leipzig 1926.
- Nietzsches Professur in Basel. Frommannsche Buchhandlung, Jena 1925.
- Eine Gerichtsreform des Kaisers Claudius. Bayerische Akademie der Wissenschaften, München 1929.
- Die Foruminschrift beim Lapis niger In: Philologus Vol. 86 (1931), p. 460.
- Das historische Fragment des Papyrus 40 der Mailänder Sammlung, In: Sitz.-Ber. d. Dt. Akad. d. Wiss. zu Berlin, Klasse f. Sprachen, Literatur und Kunst, Jahrg. 1952, Nr. 2, Berlin 1953, Nr. 2, 24 S.
- Vom Wesen der Kultur. Auszüge aus einer Ansprache zur Eröffnung der Berliner Universität. In: Aufbau: Kulturpolitische Monatsschrift. Jahrgang 1. Herausgegeben vom Kulturbund zur Demokratischen Erneuerung Deutschlands. Aufbau Verlag, Berlin 1946, S. 111–116.
