= Walter Friedrich =

German biophysicist (1883–1968)

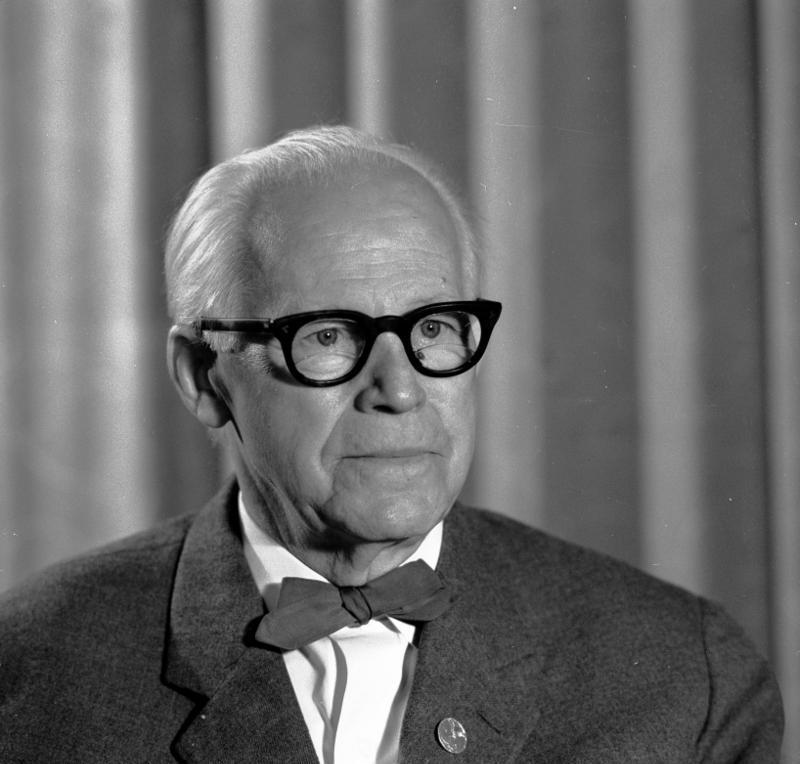
- Walter Friedrich in 1962
- Born: Walther Otto Ernst Friedrich; 25 December 1883; Salbke, Magdeburg, German Empire
- Died: 16 October 1968 (aged 84); East Berlin, East Germany
- Education: Ludwig-Maximilians-Universität München
- Scientific career
- Fields: Physics
- Workplaces: Ludwig-Maximilians-Universität München; University of Freiburg; Friedrich Wilhelm University of Berlin; German Academy of Sciences at Berlin

Walter Friedrich (25 December 1883 – 16 October 1968) was a German biophysicist and public figure.

== Biography ==
Walther Otto Ernst Friedrich was born in to the family of an engineer who encouraged him to study technical sciences from childhood. He graduated from high school in Aschersleben, where he did well in mathematics and physics, and also became interested in music, learning to play the violin, but showed no inclination for languages or history. In 1905, he entered the Geneva Academy to study music and physics, but soon interrupted his music studies. In 1911, he received a doctorate in physics from the Ludwig-Maximilians-Universität München, where he had previously studied for six years, having transferred there from Geneva, for his research on X-ray radiation.

From 1912 to 1914, he worked at the Ludwig-Maximilians-Universität München as an assistant to Max von Laue, and in 1914 he became a radiologist at the university hospital in Freiburg; Three years later, he became a Privatdozent of physics at the University of Freiburg, and in 1921, he became a professor of physics, at the same time becoming interested in the application of physics in medicine. In 1922, he lectured in Granada, Spain, as a visiting professor.

From 1923, Friedrich was a professor of medical physics at the Friedrich Wilhelm University of Berlin and in the same year he simultaneously headed the Institute for Radiation Research at the university, which he headed until 1945l. In 1929, he was appointed dean of the medical faculty of this university, having headed the German Radiological Society a year earlier. During the Nazi period, he continued his scientific work at the university and various scientific societies. According to East German sources, he helped two of his Jewish colleagues avoid deportation to camps.

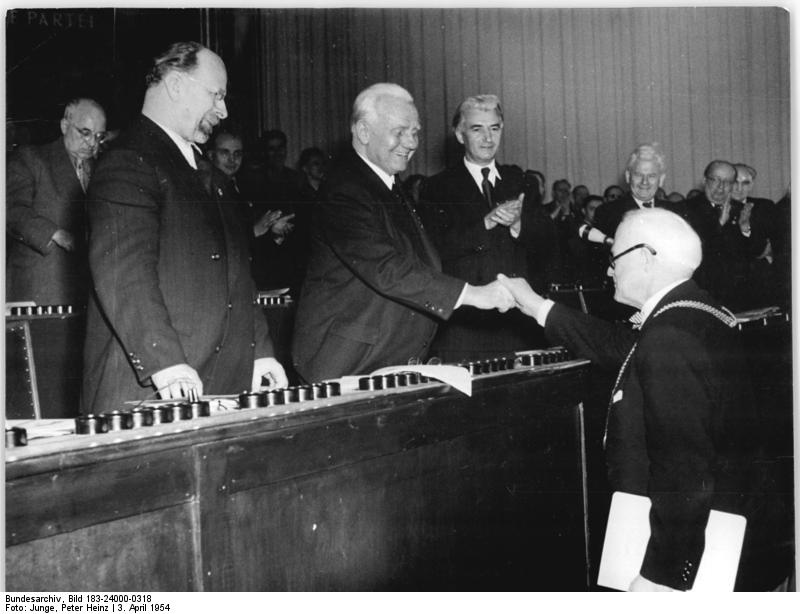
Walter Friedrich attending the 4th Congress of the Socialist Unity Party as a guest, 1954

In 1949, he was elected rector of the university, holding this position until 1952. In 1948, he was appointed director, and in 1952 president of the Institute of Biology and Medicine in the Berlin district of Buch, and in 1961 he headed the Medical and Biological Research Center of the Academy of Sciences of the GDR in Berlin. In 1949, he became an academician of the Academy of Sciences of the GDR, from 1951 to 1956 he was its president, then until 1958 its vice-president.

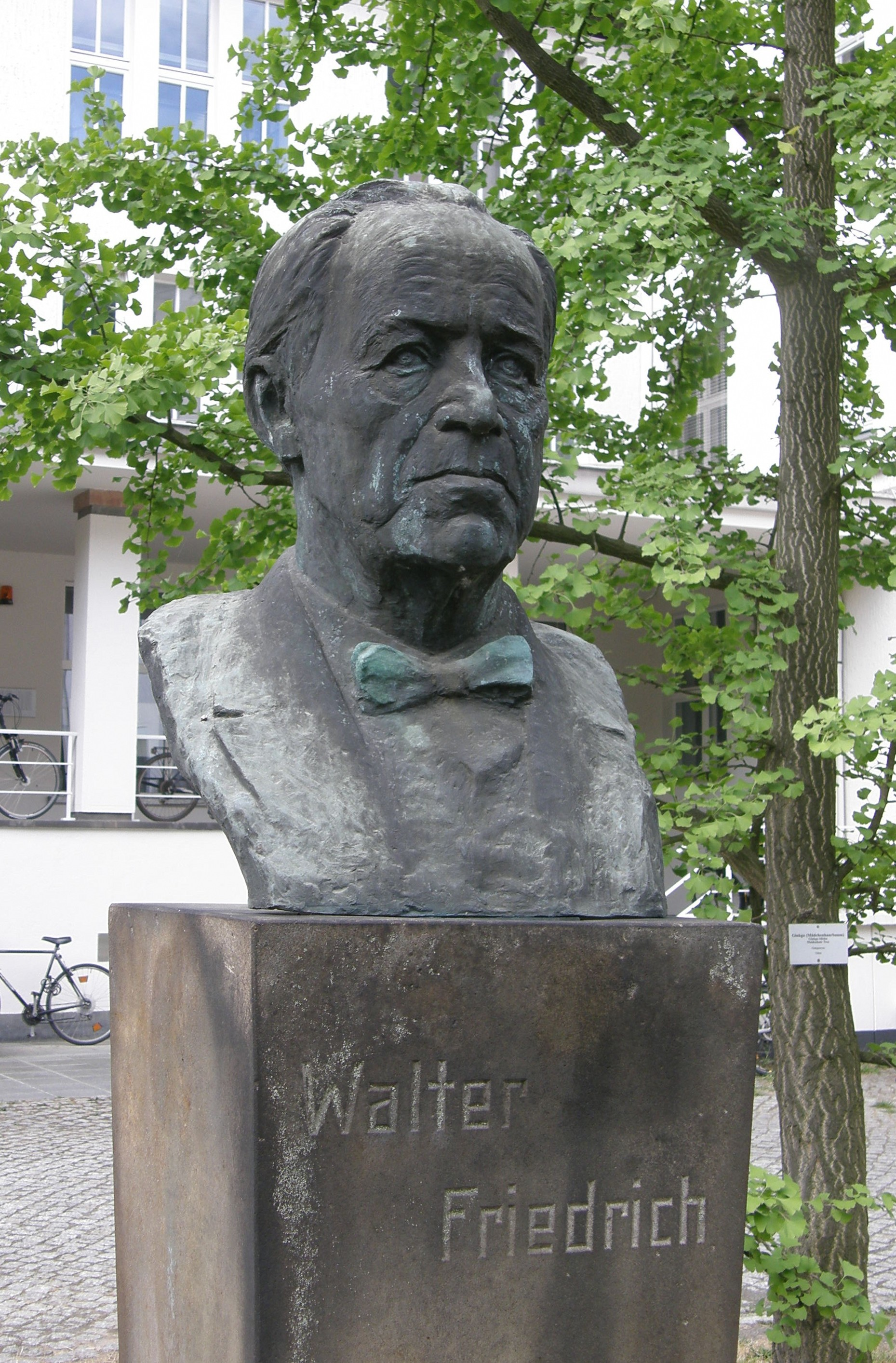
Bronze bust of Walter Friedrich in Berlin

From 1950 until the end of his life, he was president of the German Peace Council and from 1951 the vice-president of the World Peace Council. He was also a member of the Society for German–Soviet Friendship. From 1950 to 1954 Friedrich also headed the Cultural Union of the People's Chamber of the GDR, of which he was a deputy. He was a supporter of the policy of the East German government but remained non-partisan.
