= Friedel Apelt =

German politician (1902–2001)

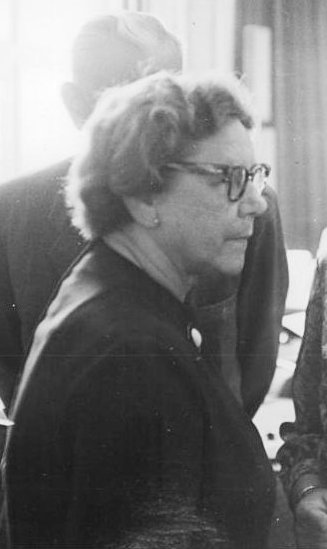
- Apelt in 1963
- Born: Frieda Anna Charlotte Raddünz; 1 November 1902; Breslau, Silesia, Germany
- Died: 12 December 2001 (aged 99); Friedrichshagen (Berlin), Germany
- Occupations: Trades union official Political and resistance activist Politician
- Political party: KPD; SED
- Spouses: Adolf Franz; Andreas Malter; Fritz Apelt

Friedel Apelt (1 November 1902 - 12 December 2001) was a German political activist, trades union official and politician (KPD/SED). During the Nazi years she participated actively in anti-fascist resistance, and spent much of the time in prison or as a concentration camp internee. After the war she was able to resume her political career in the Soviet occupation zone (relaunched, in October 1949, as the German Democratic Republic).

During a long political career she was married three times, and she may be identified in sources by any one of four names. Before her first marriage she was Frieda (or Friedel) Raddünz. After her first marriage, in 1925, she became Friedel Franz. Between 1946 and 1952 she was Friedel Malter. She retained her final name, Friedel Apelt, for nearly fifty years, between 1952 and 2001.

== Life ==
=== Provenance and early years ===
Frieda Anna Charlotte Raddünz was born in Breslau. Her father worked as a typesetter. She attended middle school locally and then worked as a weaver and homeworker, initially still in Breslau between 1917 and 1923, and again between 1927 and 1930.

=== Friedel Franz ===
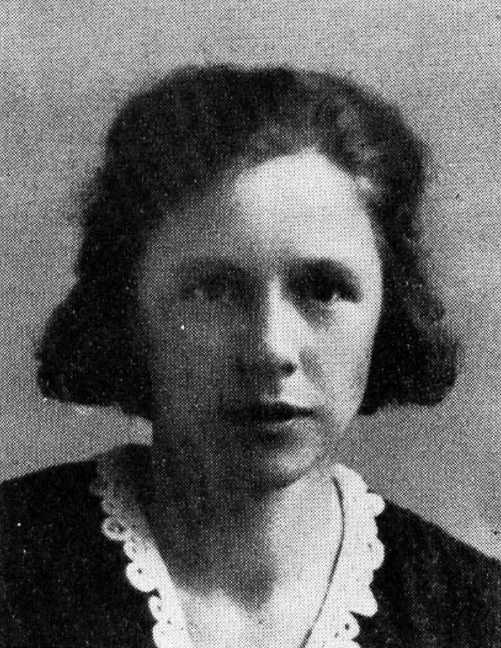
Apelt's (then Franz) official Landtag portrait, 1932

She married Adolf Franz, a miner, in 1925. He was a local Communist Party leader. In 1925 Friedel Franz joined the Textile Workers' Trades Union ("Deutscher Textilarbeiterverband" / DTV), remaining a member till her exclusion from it in 1929. She was also a works council member between 1927 and 1930. In 1926 she joined the Communist Party, becoming a member of the party's Breslau based regional leadership team ("Bezirksleitung") for Silesia, with special responsibility, between 1930 and 1933, for women's issues. As political tensions rose across Germany, in 1929 she became a member of the Revolutionary Union Opposition ("Revolutionäre Gewerkschafts Opposition" / RGO) movement.

Between 1926 and 1933 Friedel Franz sat as a member of the Provincial parliament ("Landtag") for Lower Silesia. During the later 1920s she was also, for a period, a member of the district council for Waldenburg. In 1931 she became a member of the Prussian Provincial parliament ("Landtag") itself, joining between elections. She was the youngest of the party's 31 Prussian Landtag members. In the 1932 election she was re-elected. She was not re-elected in the election of March 1933 (in which the NSDAP party obtained an overall majority, and following which the Communist Party members were in any event not permitted to take their seats). The Prussian Landtag held its final session just two months later, in May 1933.

Régime change in January 1933 heralded a rapid transition to one-party dictatorship. Work for the communist party became illegal: Friedel Franz nonetheless continued her work, and was arrested in June 1933. On 15 August 1934 she faced the special "People's Court" and was sentenced to three years in prison, convicted of the standard charge of "preparing to commit high treason" ("Vorbereitung zum Hochverrat"). She served her three-year prison sentence in Jauer before being transferred to the concentration camps at Moringen and then Lichtenburg where she spent a further two years in "protective custody". In 1938 she was released, and during 1938/39 she worked with the Edeka grocery stores co-operative. Around this time she and her husband were divorced. Adolf Franz fled to Moscow where it is thought he died of Typhus in 1942. By 1944 Friedel Franz had moved back to Breslau and was undertaking office work.

After the failure of the 20 July plot to assassinate Adolf Hitler, there were arrests of a large number of people who had been active as politicians before the Nazi takeover. The official lists were not entirely up to date, many of the names on them belonging to people who had fled abroad or died, but on the night of 22/23 August 1944 approximately 4,000 people who had been politically active before 1933 (and survived inside Nazi Germany since) were arrested. Friedel Franz was among them, in the context of what came to be known as Aktion Gitter: she was transferred to Ravensbrück concentration camp.

As a Ravensbrück internee between August 1944 and April 1945, Franz was among those tasked with clerical work for the camp commander. Later she was sent to Genshagen where a sub-camp of the Sachsenhausen concentration camp had been established as part of a programme to try and compensate for the impact on the munitions industry of the country's desperate and intensifying shortage of industrial labour. The Genshagen camp was used to provide labour for a Daimler-Benz plant in the town. In 1999, more than fifty years later, at the age of 97, having become through marriage Fridel Apelt, she was still involved in a meeting held at the nearby Wentowsee Hotel, at which concentration camp survivors met Daimler-Benz executives in order to discuss wages and fair recompense ("Lohn und Würde") in respect of their time as forced labourers at the Genshagen plant.

As Russian troops invaded from the east, concentration camps in that half of the country were hastily evacuated. On 4 May 1945, during one of the death marches of camp inmates towards the west, Friedel Franz managed to escape captivity in the Prignitz region. With three others from the group she made her way to Wittenberge which was the nearest town. She reported to the town hall in order to arrange ration coupons for food. The official whom she met explained that it was not possible for her to return home to Breslau and therefore sent her to a municipal soup kitchen ("Ernährungsamt" / literally: feeding office). Having always worked for a living, she initially rejected the idea of feeding people as a social service, but as the realities of the situation became clear she complied, and very quickly she was working at the Ernährungsamt, which soon, between May and October 1945, she found herself running. Two months later, still in Wittenberge, she set about creating a local Communist Party group.

=== Friedel Malter ===
Following the ethnic cleansing of 1944/45 and the accompanying frontier changes, her Silesian home region remained out of reach after the war ended, formally in May 1945. Wittenberge, and the large central portion of Germany in which she now found herself was administered, till October 1949, as the Soviet occupation zone. Franz remained in Wittenberge till the Autumn of 1945, when she relocated to Berlin, the eastern part of which was also included in the Soviet zone. In 1946 she married Andreas Malter, a survivor of the Sachsenhausen concentration camp. The marriage would end after approximately three years.

She was already, by the end of 1945, a department head for Women's Questions with the Communist Party Central Committee. In April 1946, following the contentious creation of the Socialist Unity Party ("Sozialistische Einheitspartei Deutschlands" / SED), Friedel Malter joined the new party which, by October 1949, was the ruling party in a new kind of German one-party dictatorship. Between 1946 and 1950 she worked as a senior head of department with the Trade Union Federation (" Freier Deutsche Gewerkschaftsbund " / FDGB), serving between 1949 and 1954 within another senior position within the organisation's administrative apparatus. She was a member of the FDGB national executive between 1946 and 1989.

She was a founder, in 1947, of the Democratic Women's League ("Demokratischer Frauenbund Deutschlands" / DFD), serving on its national executive between 1948 and 1955. The DFD was one of several mass organisations intended to broaden the popular mandate of the SED in the Soviet zone, and after October 1949, in the German Democratic Republic (East Germany). The DFD displayed several of the features of a political party, and was allocated a (fixed) quota of seats in the national parliament ("Volkskammer") by the SED. Malter herself was a member both of the People's Council ("Volksrat") and of the national parliament ("Volkskammer") which emerged from it, between 1948 and 1954. During 1949/50 she served as a member of the parliamentary presidium. Although she was, naturally, a member of the ruling SED (party), she sat in the Volkskammer not as a representative of the SED but as a representative of the FDGB which, like the DFD, enjoyed the status of an officially sanctioned mass organisation, and was allocated its own quota of seats in the Volkskammer. She also served in the Ministry for Labour and Professional Training as a secretary of state and deputy minister between 1950 and 1956.

=== Friedel Apelt ===
In November 1952, she married Fritz Apelt, a Weimar-era KPD activist who had emigrated in 1935 after being interned in the Kislau and Heuberg camps and returned after the war, eventually being appointed secretary of state and deputy culture minister in 1954. Friedel Apelt retired from all her full-time posts in 1956 on health grounds, although she continued to hold a number of less onerous, honorary and part-time positions.

Between 1959 and 1990 Friedel Apelt chaired the East German Human Rights Committee, an FDGB initiative that initially focused on West German citizens disadvantaged by the 1956 constitutional court ban on the Communist Party, although Apelt's committee later extended its remit to include persecuted left wing leaders from more distant countries, such as the Chilean Luis Corvalán and the South African Nelson Mandela. Between 1949 and 1989 she was a member of the National Council ("Nationalrat") of the National Front. She was a member of the Union of Persecutees of the Nazi Regime ("Vereinigung der Verfolgten des Naziregimes " / VVN) between 1947 and 1953, and then of its successor organisation, the League of Antifascists ("Bund der Antifaschistinnen und Antifaschisten" / BdA).

Like many long-surviving senior politicians and officials from the German Democratic Republic, Apelt lived out her final years in the "Clara Zetkin Old People's Home" ("Senioreneinrichtung Clara-Zetkin-Heim") in Berlin's Friedrichshagen quarter. She died in Friedrichshagen during the first half of December 2001, although sources differ over her precise date of death. Virtually till the end of her life she was involved in the debate over restitution for former concentration camp inmates who had been forced to work at the Genshagen Daimler-Benz plant.

== Awards and honours ==
- Clara Zetkin Medal (1955)
- Patriotic Order of Merit in Silver (1956)
- Banner of Labor (1962)
- Patriotic Order of Merit in Gold (1967)
- Order of Karl Marx (1977)
- Star of People's Friendship in Gold (1982)
- Fritz Heckert medal
