= Social Democratic Action =

Social Democratic Action Acción Social Democrática
- Abbreviation: ASD
- Founded: 1951
- Ideology: Social democracy

Social Democratic Action (Spanish: Acción Social Democrática; ASD) was an electoral alliance of the Republican Socialist Unity Party (PURS) and Social Democratic Party (PSD) in Bolivia.

The Social Democratic Action alliance was established in 1951 to contest the 1951 presidential and congressional elections. It presented as its presidential candidate Gabriel Gosálvez (PURS), with Roberto Arce (PSD) as vice presidential candidate.
