= Hans Reingruber =

German academic (1888–1964)

Minister of Transport
- In office 11 October 1949 – 30 April 1953
- Prime Minister: Otto Grotewohl
- Preceded by: Office established
- Succeeded by: Roman Chwalek

Personal details
- Born: 30 April 1888 Elberfeld, German Empire
- Died: 14 January 1964 (aged 75) Dresden, East Germany
- Party: Independent
- Education: Technical University of Hanover

Hans Reingruber (1888–1964) was a German academic and the first minister of transport or traffic of East Germany.

== Early life and education ==
Reingruber was born in Elberfeld (today Wuppertal) on 30 April 1888. In April 1908 he enrolled at Technical University of Hanover and graduated from the university in 1912 receiving a degree in civil engineering and technical sciences. In 1924 he obtained a PhD.

== Career ==
Reingruber started his career at the Prussian Ministry for Public Works which was renamed as the Reich Ministry of Transport in 1919. He served there until 1933. Following the Nazi rule he refused to become a member of the Nazi Party and left the ministry. He joined the Technical University of Dresden (TU Dresden) where he was a professor of railway and traffic engineering from 1934 to 1945. He served as its Prorector between 1946 and 1948. On 11 October 1949 Reingruber was appointed minister of traffic to the cabinet led by Minister President Otto Grotewohl. Reingruber was one of the cabinet members who were not a member of the ruling Party Socialist Unity Party. He also served as the dean of the faculty of civil engineering from 1950 to 1952. His ministerial tenure ended on 30 April 1953, and he was succeeded by Roman Chwalek in the post. Following the end of his ministerial tenure Reingruber returned to the TU Dresden and served as the department chair.

== Later years and death ==
On 1 September 1957 Reingruber retired from the university. He died in Dresden on 14 January 1964.
