= National Democratic Party of Germany (East Germany) =

East German political party

National-Democratic Party of Germany National-Demokratische Partei Deutschlands
- Founded: 25 May 1948
- Dissolved: 27 March 1990
- Preceded by: Nazi Party
- Merged into: Association of Free Democrats
- Headquarters: East Berlin, East Germany
- Newspaper: See list: National-Zeitung (federal); Norddeutsche Neueste Nachrichten; Mitteldeutsche Neueste Nachrichten; Brandenburgische Neueste Nachrichten; Thüringer Neueste Nachrichten; Sächsische Neueste Nachrichten
- Membership (late 1980s): c. 110,000
- Ideology: From 1989: National liberalism; German nationalism; Liberalism; Centrism; Until 1989: Socialism; National conservatism
- National affiliation: Democratic Bloc (1948–1950); National Front (1950–1990); Association of Free Democrats (1990)

Party flag

The National-Democratic Party of Germany (German: National-Demokratische Partei Deutschlands, NDPD) was an East German political party that served as a satellite party to the Socialist Unity Party of Germany (SED) from 1948 to 1989, representing former members of the Nazi Party, the Wehrmacht, and middle classes.

== History ==
The NDPD was co-founded by Lothar Bolz (a former member of the Communist Party of Germany and the National Committee for a Free Germany in the Soviet Union), Wilhelm Adam (a former member of the SA) and others. It was intended to reach out to social groups that had been attracted by the Nazi Party (NSDAP) before 1945 (such as military men or middle class Petite bourgeoisie) and provide them with a political outlet, so that they would not be tempted by far-right politics again or turn to the anti-communist Western Allies. German nationalism had been a potent force during the interwar era, millions of Germans had been members of the NSDAP, and Stalin wanted to use them to create a new pro-Soviet and anti-Western strain in German politics. According to top Soviet diplomat Vladimir Semyonov, Stalin even suggested that they could be allowed to continue publishing their own newspaper, Völkischer Beobachter. German Communists and some Soviet officials were initially appalled by Stalin's ideas and were not enthusiastic in their implementation. Instead, the party launched a regional daily, Mitteldeutsche Neueste Nachrichten, in 1952.

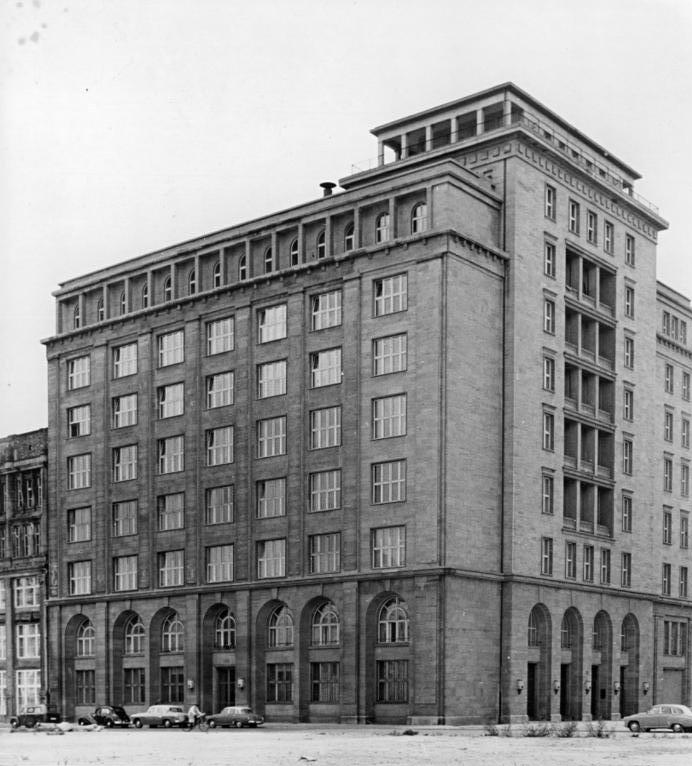
NDPD house in East Berlin in 1959

In addition to old NSDAP members, former Wehrmacht officers and displaced persons were also to be intercepted by the new party, like the West German All-German Bloc/League of Expellees and Deprived of Rights and the Austrian Federation of Independents. The Socialist Unity Party of Germany (SED) Board, meeting in May 1948, stated that "these politically unclear people" should not vote "cadets" for the bourgeois parties CDU and LDPD at the next election, like the West German CDU and FDP.

According to Klaus Schroeder, the NDPD had fewer former Nazis among its ranks than the communist SED had. This was due to the NDPD being much smaller than the SED.

The NDPD was recognized by the Soviet Military Administration in Germany on 16 August 1948 and later sent 52 delegates to the East German parliament, the Volkskammer, as part of the National Front. None of these ever voted against the government on any issue, similarly to other block parties which were effectively puppets of the ruling party, the SED.

Nonetheless, after the fall of the Berlin Wall, the NDPD became an independent agent in politics, participating in the only free Volkskammer election ever held (on 18 March 1990). NDPD was not included in the electoral cartel of the other liberal-to-be parties in East Germany and entered the race alone. The results were a debacle: with 44,292 votes (0.38%) they received fewer votes than they (nominally) had members. On 27 March 1990 the NDPD became part of the Bund Freier Demokraten, a short-lived organization that eventually merged into the Free Democratic Party (FDP).

== Programme and ideology ==
The NDPD programme demanded, among other things, the promotion of the middle class. Bolz was one of the few prominent members who was not a former Nazi and was, in fact, a member of the SED until he founded the new party. He had previously been a member of the Communist Party of Germany until it was suppressed by the Nazis. The NDPD was established by the communist authorities with the aim of claiming support among these ranks of society. The NDPD was organised on democratic centralist grounds and had 110,000 members in the late 1980s.

The party was supposed to represent liberalism, like the Liberal Democratic Party of Germany, and (at least initially) also played with the German national sentiment. However, the NDPD was even more loyal to the SED and was reluctant to criticise the government even during the Peaceful Revolution of 1989.

After the revolution, there were attempts by the far-right National Democratic Party (NPD) and the right-wing populist The Republicans to win the NDPD as an ally, but this failed.

Later, the NDPD understood itself as a centrist party and distanced itself from communist and nationalist/neo-fascist endeavors. Likewise, they were pro-European and rejected designation as "right-wing party", right-wing national or national conservative. It was also argued to rename the party "New Democratic Party of Germany".

== Chairmen of the NDPD ==
Lothar Bolz	1948–1972
Heinrich Homann	1972–1989
Günter Hartmann	1989–1990
Wolfgang Glaeser	1990
Wolfgang Rauls	1990

== Electoral history ==
Volkskammer elections

Election	Votes	%	Seats	+/–
1949	as part of Democratic Bloc		15 / 330 (Note: The 1,400 elected members of the Third German People's Congress selected the members of the second German People's Council.)	–
1950	as part of National Front		30 / 400	▲15
1954	as part of National Front		45 / 466	▲15
1958	as part of National Front		45 / 400	Steady
1963	as part of National Front		45 / 434	Steady
1967	as part of National Front		45 / 434	Steady
1971	as part of National Front		45 / 434	Steady
1976	as part of National Front		45 / 434	Steady
1981	as part of National Front		52 / 500	▲7
1986	as part of National Front		52 / 500	Steady
1990	44,292	0.4%	2 / 400	▼50

== See also ==
- Politics of East Germany
- National Front (East Germany)
