= Karl Hamann =

German politician (1903–1973)

Dr. Karl Hamann
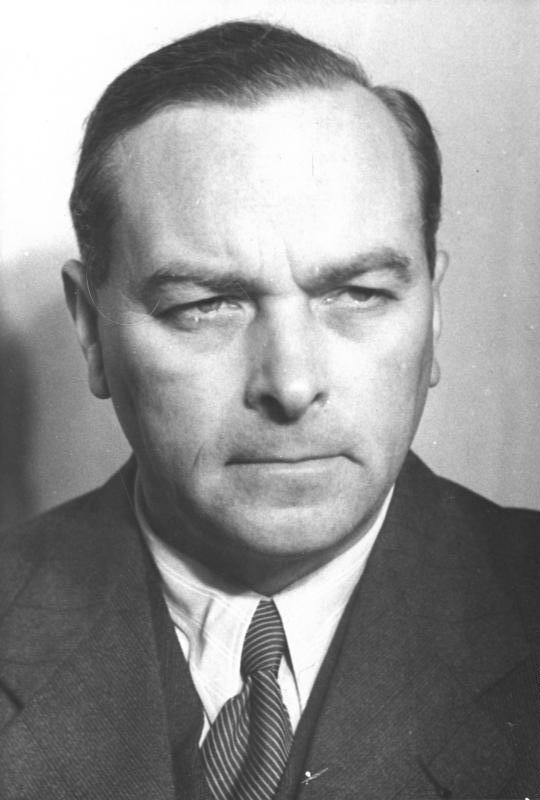
- Karl Hamann (1950)
- Born: 4 March 1903; Hildesheim, Province of Hanover, Prussia, German Empire
- Died: 6 June 1973 (aged 70); Munich, West Germany
- Occupation: Politician
- Political party: LDPD

Karl Otto Hamann (4 March 1903 in Hildesheim – 16 June 1973 in Munich) was a German politician. Between 1948 and 1952 he was chairman of the Liberal Democratic Party of (East) Germany (LDPD) and also the German Democratic Republic's Minister for Trade and Supply.

In December 1952 he was arrested, stripped of his positions and imprisoned. Following his release, in May 1957 he was able to flee to West Germany, but he never again engaged in public politics.

== Life ==
=== Early years ===
From 1922 till 1927 Hamann studied Agricultural Sciences at Hohenheim, Bonn and Berlin. Subsequently he became the head of Employment Offices in Schwerte, Hörde and Dortmund, and, in 1931, of a relocation co-operative in Thuringia. In 1933 he was awarded a doctorate from the University of Bonn for a dissertation entitled "The Labour Market in the Westphalian Agriculture Sector". From 1935, following a series of company directorships, he lived as an independent farmer near Römhild in Thuringia.

=== East Germany ===
After the war his Thuringian home found itself in the Soviet occupation zone of Germany which was in the process of mutating into the German Democratic Republic, politically separated both from West Germany and from those parts of the former country which, following the border changes agreed by the Potsdam Conference now found themselves in Poland and the Soviet Union. Back in 1933 Hamann had been a supporter of the SPD (moderate socialist party) but now, in 1946, he joined the Liberal Democratic Party of (East) Germany, becoming the party's regional Chairman for Thuringia.

In 1948 Karl Hamann became the party's national chairman in East Germany, confirmed in office, together with Hermann Kastner, in 1949. Soon after this Kastner was replaced and Hamann's co-chairman became Hans Loch. The LDPD was not an independent political party because the Nation Building project under which the new country was being constructed envisaged a one party state, albeit one that at least initially felt able to present itself as a multi-party state. The LDPD was one of a number of minor parties included in the so-called National Front grouping, permitted to operate under the control of the country's ruling SED (party), an arrangement not without certain inherent tensions. In addition to his other roles, between 1946 and 1950 Hamann sat as a member of the Thüringer Landtag (regional assembly). From 1949 he also sat as a member of the national Volkskammer (Peoples' Chamber) and served as East Germany's Minister for Trade and Supplies.

Hamann's ministerial responsibilities for trade and supply proved impossible to accomplish in a state that was becoming increasingly isolated, especially after reforms which left East and West Germany with different currencies. The Single list election process introduced for the 1949 assembly election and repeated for the 1950 General Election, as well as the "Construction of Socialism" ("Aufbau des Sozialismus") proclamation at the SED party conference in July 1952 encountered no public opposition from Hamann, however. Like others in the LDPD he placed all his hopes in a rapid reunification of the country which would reverse the anti-democratic and illiberal measures being implemented by the East German government under Walter Ulbricht.

In 1952 Hamann was arrested, because he had "systematically sabotaged the people's welfare" ("planmäßige Versorgung der Bevölkerung sabotiert"). He was relieved of his responsibilities and expelled from the LDPD. More than two years of "investigatory detention" at the Hohenschönhausen Jail followed. In July 1954 he was sentenced, in a secret trial, to ten years in prison, but he was pardoned in October 1956 and let out. In May 1957 he fled to the German Federal Republic (West Germany).

=== West Germany ===
Dr. Hamann died in Munich a couple of months after his seventieth birthday. His grave is in the Central Cemetery at Bad Godesberg (Bonn).

== Posthumous rehabilitation and celebration ==
In May 1990 the successor organisation to the LDPD, the short-lived Association of Free Democrats, formally rehabilitated Karl Hamann. Legal rehabilitation by the Berlin regional court followed in August 1991.

The Karl Hamann Foundation for Political Education in Brandenburg was named in his honour.

== Publication ==
- Die Aufgaben für Einheit und Frieden. ("The Tasks for Unity and freedom") speech, Dresden 1951.
