= Heinrich Rau =

German Communist politician (1899–1961)

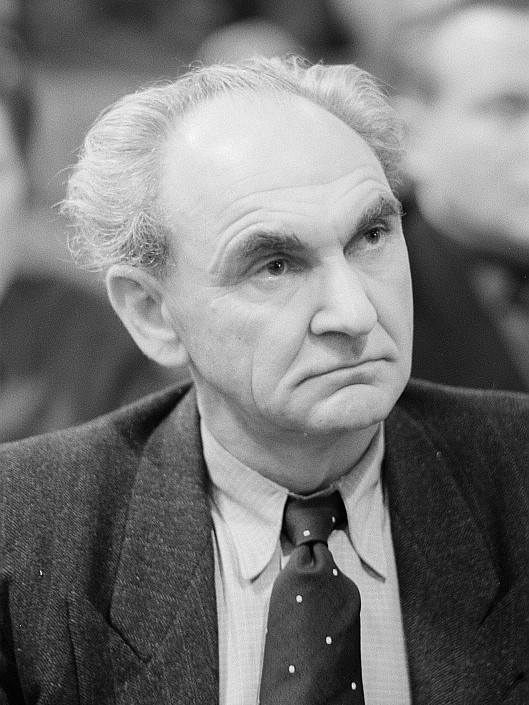
- Rau in 1951

Deputy Chairman of the Council of Ministers (Note: "Deputy Minister-President" until 8 December 1958)
- In office 16 November 1950 – 23 March 1961
- Chairman: Otto Grotewohl
- Preceded by: Multi-member position
- Succeeded by: Multi-member position

Chairman of the State Planning Commission
- In office 8 November 1950 – 23 May 1952
- Minister-President: Otto Grotewohl
- First Deputy: Friedrich Behrens
- Preceded by: Himself (as Minister for Planning)
- Succeeded by: Bruno Leuschner

Minister for Planning
- In office 7 October 1949 – 8 November 1950
- Minister-President: Otto Grotewohl
- Preceded by: Position established
- Succeeded by: Himself (as Chairman of the State Planning Commission)

Chairman of the German Economic Commission
- In office 9 March 1948 – 7 October 1949
- Deputy: Bruno Leuschner Fritz Selbmann
- Preceded by: Position established
- Succeeded by: Position abolished
Parliamentary constituencies
Member of the Volkskammer for Berlin
In office 18 March 1948 – 23 March 1961
Preceded by	Constituency established
Succeeded by	Josef Schicketanz
Member of the Landtag of Prussia for Berlin
In office 14 June 1928 – 31 March 1933
Preceded by	Multi-member district
Succeeded by	Constituency abolished

Personal details
- Born: Heinrich Gottlob Rau; 2 April 1899 Feuerbach, Kingdom of Württemberg, German Empire
- Died: 23 March 1961 (aged 61) East Berlin, East Germany
- Resting place: Zentralfriedhof Friedrichsfelde, Berlin, Germany
- Party: SPD (1913–1917); USPD (1917–1919); KPD (1919–1946); SED (1946–1961)
- Other political affiliations: Spartacus League (1916–1919)
- Spouse: Elisabeth Bihr (m. 1920, divorced) Helene Heß (m. 1923, divorced)
- Children: 3 sons, 1 daughter
- Known for: Leader of the XI International Brigade; Chairman of the German Economic Commission; Leading economic politician and diplomat of East Germany

Military service
- Allegiance: German Empire; Revolutionaries; Spanish Republic
- Branch/service: Imperial German Army; Spartacus League; International Brigades
- Years of service: 1917–1918; 1918–1919; 1937–1939
- Rank: Brigade Commander
- Commands: XI International Brigade
- Battles/wars: World War I; Western Front; German Revolution; Spanish Civil War; Battle of Brunete; Battle of Belchite; Battle of Teruel; Aragon Offensive (WIA); La Retirada
- Central institution membership: 1950–1961: Full member, Politburo of the Central Committee; 1949–1950: Candidate member, Politburo of the Central Committee; 1949–1961: Full member, Central Committee (Note: Party Executive Committee until 1950); 1920–1921: Member, KPD Central Commission; Other offices held: 1955–1961: Minister, Ministry of Foreign Trade and Internal German Trade; 1953–1955: Minister, Ministry of Mechanical Engineering; 1946–1948: Minister, Ministry of Economic Planning of Brandenburg; 1946–1948: Member, Landtag of Brandenburg; 1918–1919: Chief, Zuffenhausen Military Police

Heinrich Gottlob "Heiner" Rau (2 April 1899 – 23 March 1961) was a German communist politician during the Weimar Era, a commander in the International Brigades during the Spanish Civil War, and a leading East German statesman after World War II.

Rau grew up in a suburb of Stuttgart, where early on he became active in socialist youth organizations. After military service in World War I, he participated in the German revolution of 1918–1919. From 1920 onward, he was a leading agricultural policy maker of the Communist Party of Germany (KPD). This ended in 1933, when Adolf Hitler came to power. Shortly afterward Rau was thrown in jail for two years. As an enemy of the Nazi regime in Germany he was imprisoned, in total, for more than half of the time of Hitler's rule. After his first imprisonment he emigrated in 1935 to the Soviet Union (USSR). From there, in 1937, he went on to Spain, where he participated in the Spanish Civil War as a leader of one of the International Brigades. In 1939, he was arrested in France, and was delivered by the Vichy regime back to Nazi Germany in 1942. After a few months in a Gestapo prison, he was transferred to the Mauthausen concentration camp in March 1943. While in the concentration camp he participated in conspiratorial prisoner activities, which led to a camp uprising in the final days before the end of World War II in Europe.

After the war he played an important role in the political scene of East Germany. Before the establishment of an East German state he was the chairman of the German Economic Commission, the precursor to the East German government. Subsequently, he became chairman of the National Planning Commission of East Germany and a deputy chairman of the East German Council of Ministers. He was a leading economic politician and diplomat of East Germany and led various ministries at different times. Within East Germany's ruling Socialist Unity Party of Germany (SED) he was a member of the party's Central Committee Politburo.

== Origins and early political career ==
=== Stuttgart ===
==== Early years until World War I ====
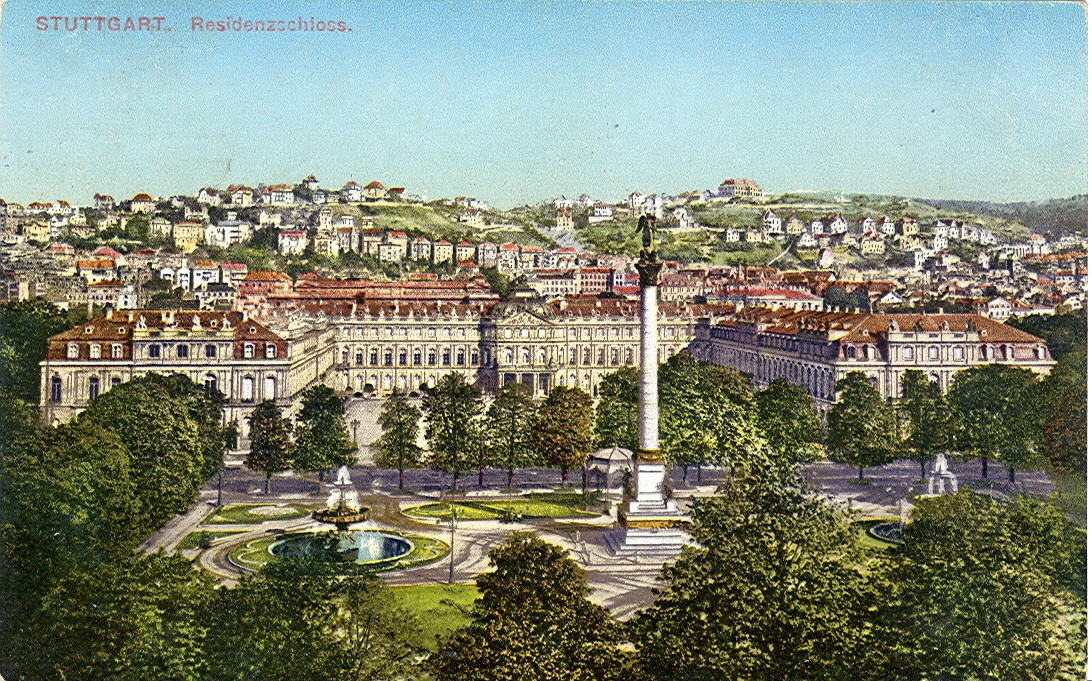
Stuttgart's New Castle c. 1916. The upper parts of the then-adjacent Wilhelm Palais can be seen behind the right wing of the castle.

Rau was born in Feuerbach, now a part of Stuttgart, in the German Kingdom of Württemberg, the son of a peasant who later became a factory worker. He grew up in the adjacent city of Zuffenhausen, now also a part of Stuttgart. After finishing school in spring 1913, he started work as a press operator in a shoe factory. In November 1913 he changed his employer and moved to the Bosch factory works in Feuerbach. There he completed his training as metal presser and remained until autumn 1920, with interruptions due to war service during 1917-1918 and the subsequent German Revolution of 1918–1919.

From 1913 Rau also was active in the labour movement. In that year he joined the metal workers' union (Deutscher Metallarbeiterverband) and a social democratic youth group in Zuffenhausen. During the following years, which saw the beginning of World War I, Rau's youth group, whose leader he became in 1916, was significantly influenced by the left wing of the Social Democratic Party of Germany (SPD). The leftists considered the war a conflict between "imperialist powers". A few local members of a far left SPD group, among them Edwin Hoernle and Albert Schreiner, who later became well-known members of the Spartacus League (Spartakusbund), visited the youth group in Zuffenhausen and gave lectures. In 1916, Rau joined the Spartacists as well and became a co-founder of their youth organisation. In accordance with the politics of the Spartacists, in 1917 he joined the left-wing Independent Social Democratic Party of Germany (USPD) and in 1919 the Communist Party of Germany (KPD), which had been founded mainly by members of the Spartacus League.

In spring 1917, Rau, by this time an elected trade union official in his firm, participated in the attempt to organise a strike against the war. His action led to a reprimand from his employer, and may have hastened his conscription into the army in August 1917. In the army he was trained in the Zuffenhausen-garrisoned Infantry Regiment 126 and deployed to the Western Front as member of a machine gun company. In September 1918 a shell splinter penetrated his lungs. In the following weeks, he was treated in military hospitals in Weimar and in Stuttgart's neighbouring town Ludwigsburg. While in Ludwigsburg, Rau managed to get leave at short notice on 8 November 1918 and joined the in those days developing revolution in Stuttgart.

==== Revolution ====
The revolution in November 1918 led in Württemberg, like everywhere in Germany, to the end of the monarchy. King William II left Stuttgart on 9 November, shortly after a revolutionary crowd had stormed his residence, the Wilhelm Palais and flown a red flag above the building. (Note: As the king had demanded that no blood should be shed for his sake, and thus de facto had rejected the use of weapons, this event occurred nearly bloodless. The crowd was able to disarm a nearby stationed security troop, which was not given order, what to do, without resistance. At least one of the guards at the Wilhelm Palais was badly beaten before other revolutionaries intervened and tended his wounds. The still quite popular king was unharmed.) On the very same day the demonstrators were also able to seize some of Stuttgart's barracks, where parts of the garrisons openly joined them. Rau took active part in the events in Stuttgart's streets on this and the following day.

These happenings were a first cumulation of a civil commotion, that had started a few days earlier with large strikes and demonstrations. On 4 November 1918, a first workers' council under the leadership of the 23-year-old Spartacist Fritz Rück had been established in Stuttgart. During the following days and weeks more spontaneously elected worker and soldier councils were formed, and took over a large part of Württemberg. Rau was elected leader of the military police in his home city of Zuffenhausen, a part of Stuttgart's urban area.

As early as 9 November, about 150 councillors gathered for a two-day meeting in Stuttgart. A majority of the councillors entrusted the leaders of the SPD and USPD political parties, who had been invited to the meeting, with the establishment of a provisional government in Württemberg. The Spartacist Albert Schreiner, then chairman of a soldier council, initially assumed the key position of Minister of War in this quickly established first government, which for the time being shared power with the councils. However, he resigned already a few days later, after disputes about the future course of the government. While the Spartacists considered as their ideal aim the kinds of results achieved by the previous year's October Revolution in Russia, the position of the other USPD politicians was unclear and the SPD leaders supported a parliamentary democracy and early elections in Württemberg. (Note: Arthur Crispien and Ulrich Fischer, the two USPD ministers in the cabinet, sympathised with the communists during a communist revolt in Stuttgart, in January 1919. Afterward they were removed from office.)

During the ensuing months the communists tried repeatedly to seize power in Stuttgart and other cities in Württemberg through armed rebellion, accompanied by large-scale strikes. (Note: The communists had a strong presence in Stuttgart's factories. For example, at the Works council elections (Betriebsratswahl) at the Daimler-Motoren-Gesellschaft (Mercedes) in March 1920, the candidates of KPD and USPD together received about three quarters of the votes. Similar results had already occurred in January 1919 at elections to a forerunner body of the works council. The majority structure at Rau's firm, the Bosch factory works in Feuerbach, was comparable in these years.) They seized public buildings and print offices. During one such an attempt - at the beginning of April 1919 when the Bavarian Soviet Republic was formally proclaimed in Munich - a general strike took place in the Stuttgart area. The government in Stuttgart imposed a state of emergency and 16 people died in street fights. At the time of these events, Rau used his position as chief of the military police in Zuffenhausen to shut down companies that remained operational while the strike was ongoing. However, when the strike collapsed, Rau was removed from office by the government.

Rau resumed his employment at Bosch in Feuerbach. During another general strike in several Württemberg cities, from 28 August to 4 September 1920, he led the strike committee in his firm, which resulted in his dismissal.

==== Influences ====
From 1919 until 1920 Rau was head of the local KPD group in Zuffenhausen, and chaired the KPD organisation in Stuttgart. The party leader in Württemberg at this time was Edwin Hoernle. Hoernle had visited Rau's youth group in Zuffenhausen and had become a long-standing friend; he was an influential teacher for Rau and made his voluminous library available to Rau to use.

The most outstanding ideological authority of the movement in Stuttgart, during the time of Rau's political involvement there, was however Clara Zetkin. She was a founding member of the Second International, about whom Friedrich Engels once had written, that he liked her very much, while emperor Wilhelm II is said to have referred to her as the "worst witch in Germany". She had been living in a Stuttgart suburb since 1891 and, since then, been gathering a circle of Württemberg Marxists around her, among them Rau's friend Hoernle, who had been editing with her the magazine Die Gleichheit. Her house, built in 1903 in Sillenbuch (now a part of Stuttgart), had become a meeting place of leading national and local left-wing and communist activists. It was also visited by international communist leaders like Vladimir Lenin, who stayed there overnight in 1907. In 1920, when Zetkin was elected to the Reichstag in Berlin, Hoernle and Rau moved to Berlin as well.

=== Berlin ===
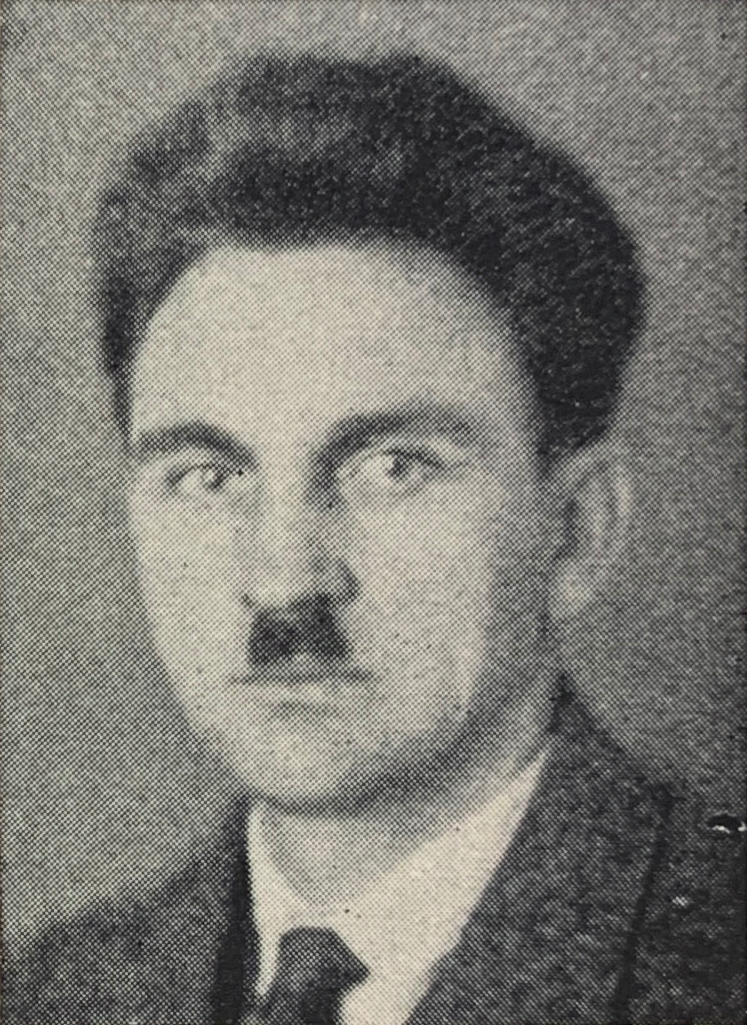
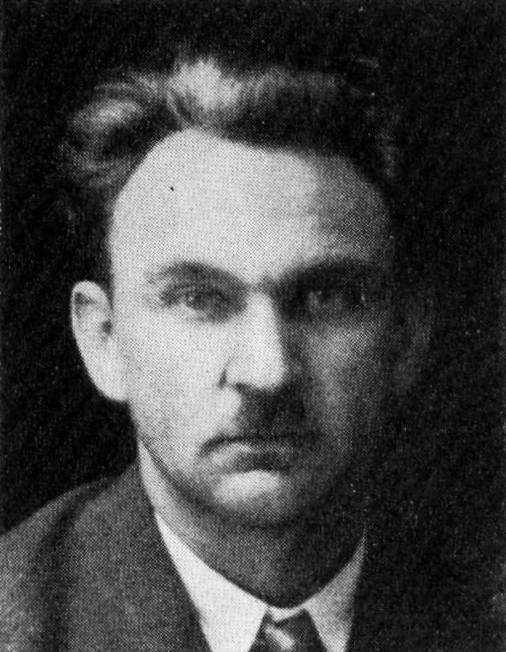
Rau's official Landtag portraits, 1928 and 1932

In November 1920 Rau became a full-time party functionary and the secretary of the agricultural division of the Central Committee of the KPD in Berlin. Between 1921 and 1930 he lectured at the Land and Federal schools of the KPD, and edited a few left-wing agricultural journals.

The head of the Central Committee's Division for Agriculture initially was Edwin Hoernle, with whom Rau had come from Stuttgart. Hoernle had been elected to the Executive Committee of the Comintern (ECCI) in November 1922 and Rau succeeded him as division chief the following year. Afterwards, Rau also became a leading member of various national and international left wing farmer and peasant organisations. From 1923 onward, he was a member of the Secretariat of the International Committee of the Agricultural and Forest Workers and beginning in 1924 of the executive committee of the Reich Peasant Federation (Reichsbauernbund). In 1930 this was followed with a membership on the International Peasants' Council in Moscow and in 1931 he became an office member of the European Peasant Committee. From 1928 to 1933 he was also member of the Preußischer Landtag, the Prussian federal state parliament. There he joined the committee on agricultural affairs of the parliament and became its chairman.

== Imprisonment, International Brigades, World War II ==
After Hitler's rise to power in January 1933 and the subsequent suppression of the KPD, Rau became a Central Committee's party instructor for southwest Germany and was active in building an underground party organisation there. On 23 May 1933 Rau was arrested and on 11 December 1934 convicted, together with Bernhard Bästlein, for "preparations to commit high treason" by the People's Court of Germany. He was sentenced to two years imprisonment. After his release from custody, he emigrated to the USSR in August 1935, via Czechoslovakia, and became a deputy chairman of the International Agrarian Institute in Moscow.

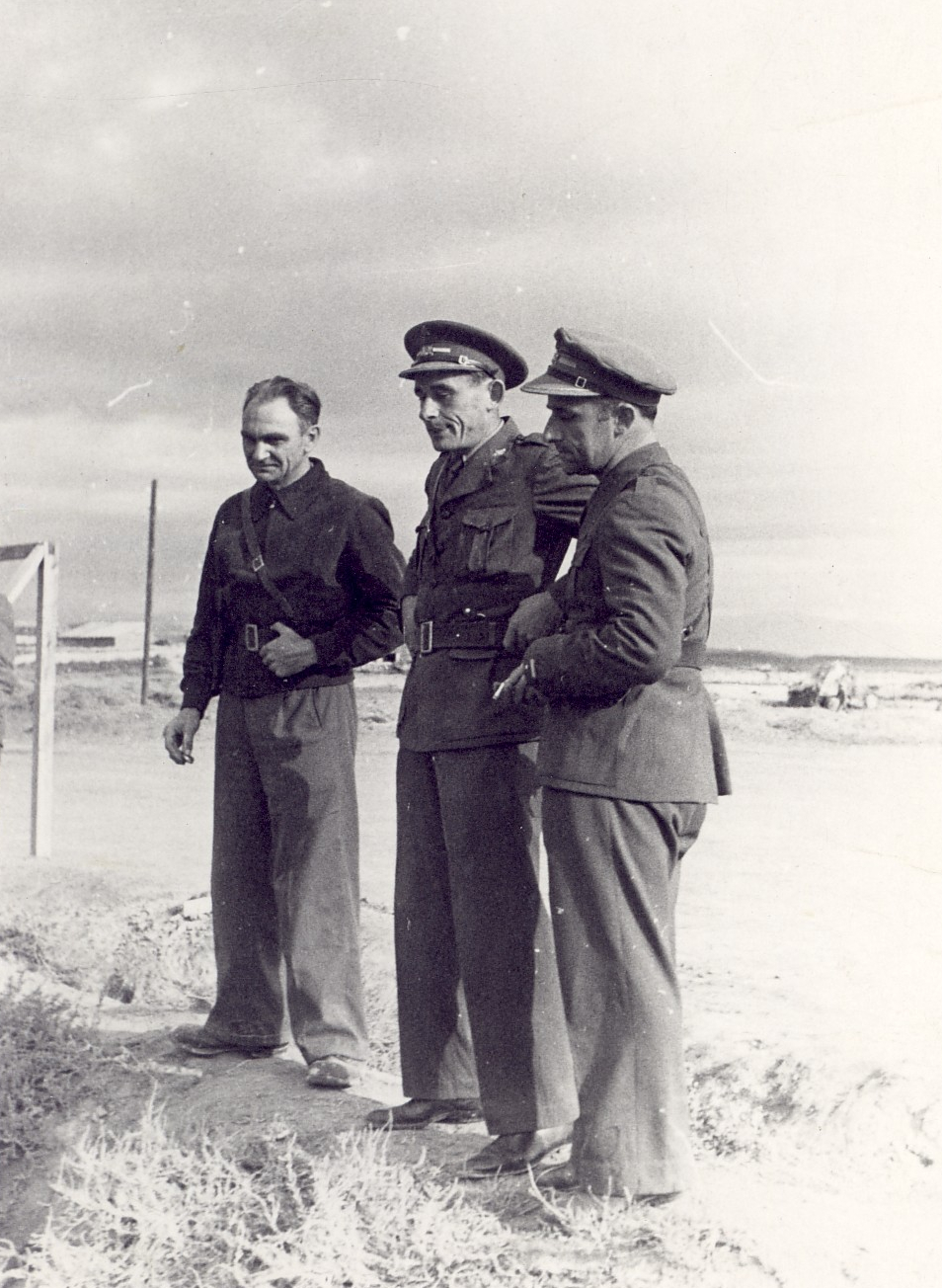
Heinrich Rau, Richard Staimer and Kurt Frank in Spain c. 1937–1938

After the outbreak of the Spanish Civil War and following the formation of the International Brigades, Rau attended a school for military commanders in Ryazan (USSR), and subsequently went to Spain. After his arrival in April 1937, he joined the XI International Brigade and participated in the civil war as political commissar, beginning in May 1937, then as chief of staff and finally commander of the brigade, until March 1938, when he was injured. (Note: In 1936 five international brigades were established, which, perhaps "for the purpose to make them appear more formidable to the enemy, were named the XIth, XIIth, XIIIth, XIVth and XVth International Brigades".) Although the brigade achieved some temporary successes during these months, Francisco Franco's troops were already on the road to victory. Rau's brigade saw combat in the battles of Brunete, Belchite, Teruel and the Aragon Offensive, where Rau was wounded.

When Rau took charge of the XI Brigade, he might have been at odds with his predecessor, Richard Staimer, the future son-in-law of KPD leader Wilhelm Pieck. (Note: There is some evidence, which at least in part hints in this direction: According to authors like Carlos Engel, Rau replaced Richard Staimer on 3 November 1937. According to an official report, written by the former leading brigade officer Gustav Szinda in 1940 in Moscow, Rau however followed Staimer at the beginning of January 1938, when Staimer left Spain for Moscow. Szinda wrote in accordance with the official version of the events desired by the Soviet and the Comintern leadership at the time, and also described Hans Kahle as the brigade's first commander while failing to mention his predecessor, 'Gen. Kléber', who had fallen into disgrace in the meantime. Szinda himself was a temporary acting commander of the brigade after Rau's injury. East German communists later were struck by the enmity between Rau and Staimer, the origin of which was supposed to have originated in Spain. Speculation and accusations also emerged that Richard Staimer had murdered the brigade's early commissar Hans Beimler on behalf of the Soviet secret service NKVD (An important partisan of this thesis was Beimlers's close friend Antonia Stern.)) This was the time of the Great Purge which had its echos in Spain, and it could be perilous to have powerful enemies. André Marty, the chief commissar of the International Brigades based at Albacete, was also an executor of the Great Purge in Spain. Following Rau's injury, Marty managed to imprison him under a pretext for a brief time. A report, written in Moscow in 1940, described Rau as a "political criminal", who had had contact with the Spanish anarchists and members of the Workers' Party of Marxist Unification (POUM), which was demonized as "Trotskyist". These were serious allegations in this time, when accusations of Trotskyism frequently led to a death sentence if the accused was within reach of the authorities.

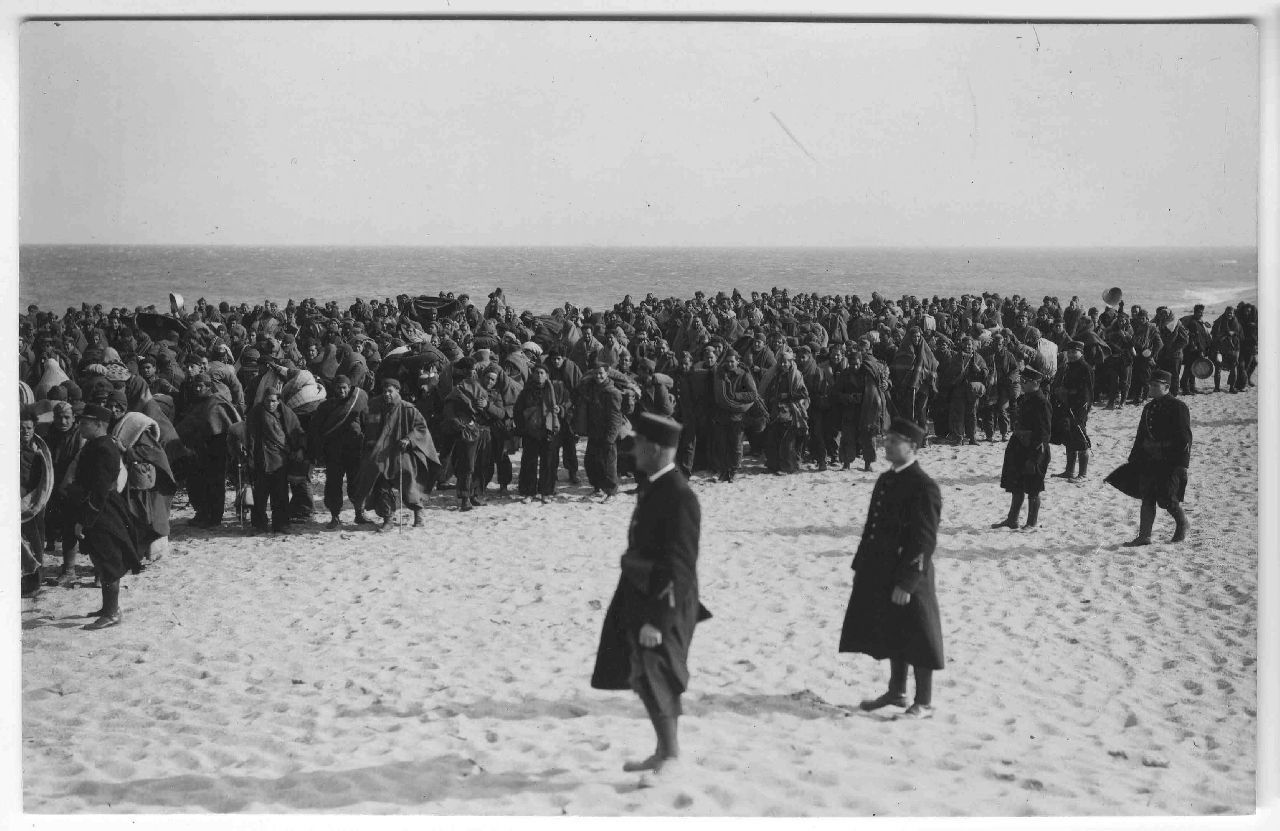
Guarded by French soldiers, Republican refugees arrive at the Argelers concentration camp, March 1939

It seems, however, that Rau also had influential friends. He was released from prison and expelled from Spain. He moved to France in May 1938. There, he was in charge of the emergency committee of the German and Austrian Spain fighters and member of the KPD country leadership in Paris until 1939. At the beginning of 1939 Rau crossed the border to Spain again and subsequently led, together with Ludwig Renn, the remainders of the XI Brigade. Together with other remaining international units – now combined in the "Agrupación Internacional" – they fought on Spain's northern border after the fall of Barcelona, protecting the stream of refugees escaping to France. Thus the Agrupación enabled the escape of perhaps some 470,000 civilians and soldiers.

Rau was arrested by the French authorities in September 1939 and sent to Camp Vernet, an internment centre in France, and in November 1941 to a secret prison in Castres. In June 1942, he was handed over to the Gestapo by the Vichy regime and was held until March 1943 in the Gestapo prison in the Prince Albrecht Street. Afterwards he was sent to the Mauthausen Concentration Camp, where he remained until May 1945, when he participated in a camp rebellion as one of the organisers of a secret military camp organisation. (Note: During the past two years, inmates, under the leadership of imprisoned Soviet officers and Spain fighters like Rau, had built a secret military organisation in the camp. Franz Dahlem, then member of the illegal 'International Camp Committee' later wrote, that the leading Soviet colonel Shanzshejew had informed him, that a total of 11 fighting groups had been available, among them 3 Soviet groups and 3 German speaking groups, including one from pre-war Austria. The other groups were 1 French speaking group and respectively one group from each of the areas of Czechoslovakia, Poland, Spain and Yugoslavia. Finally, on 5 May 1945, the 'International Camp Committee' triggered the rebellion. (Note: Erich Woitinas' reference from 1977 to Franz Dahlem's writing was IML (Institut für Marxismus-Leninismus), ZPA (Central party archive of the SED), EA 1078. Meanwhile, the IML ceased to exist and the ZPA is part of the 'SAPMO' section of the German Federal Archives(SAPMO) in Berlin. The correct reference should be 'German Federal Archives, SAPMO, ZPA, EA 1078'.) According to Woitinas, Rau played an essential role in the uprising: "Heinrich Rau was, as one of the organisers of the secret military organisation, crucially involved in the success of the liberation action." ("Heinrich Rau war als einer der Organisatoren der geheimen Militärorganisation am Gelingen der Befreiungsaktion entscheidend beteiligt."))

== East Germany ==
=== 1945–1949 ===
==== New start in Brandenburg ====
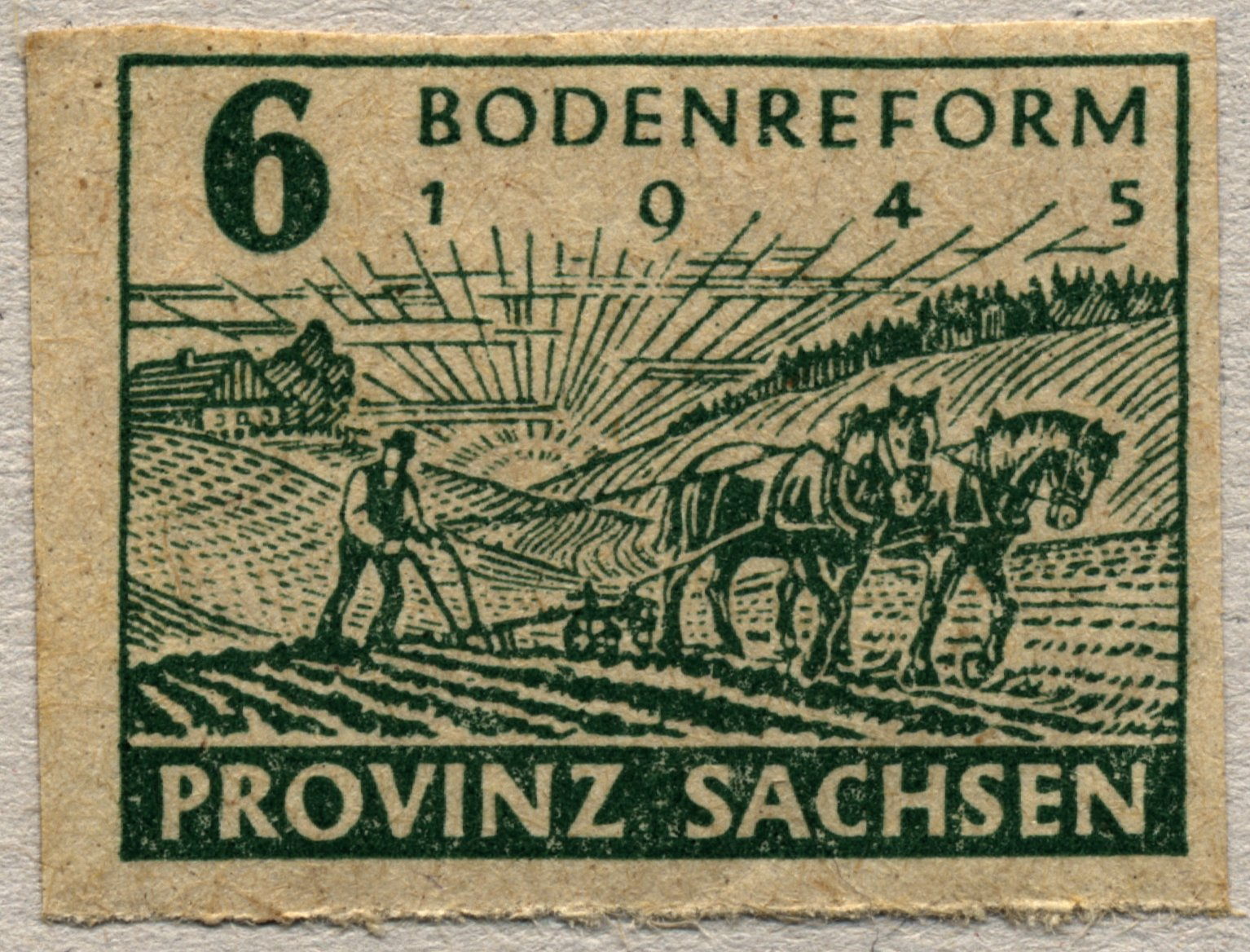
Stamp advertising land reform in Saxony, December 1945

When the war was over, Rau went to Vienna for some weeks and helped the KPD representatives in the city gather liberated political prisoners from Germany. He left Vienna in July 1945, when he led a car convoy with 120 former Mauthausen inmates to the Soviet occupied part of Berlin.

In September 1945, the Soviets appointed Rau a member of the provisional chairmanship of the province of Brandenburg with the title of a vice-president and responsibility for food, agriculture and forests. Rau succeeded Edwin Hoernle, who had held this position since the end of June and became chairman of the central administration for agriculture and forests in the Soviet Occupation Zone (SBZ). In his new position, Rau was a member of the commission for the execution of the land reform in the province. In spring 1946 he assumed responsibility for economy and transport in Brandenburg. In this capacity, he was, from June 1946 onwards, chairman of the newly established sequester commission in the province. 1946 was also the year of the forced merger of eastern KPD and eastern SPD into the Socialist Unity Party of Germany (SED), resulting in Rau's membership in the SED. Important 1946 events in Brandenburg were in November elections, which preceded an official status change from a province to a federal state in the following year. Afterwards, from 1946 until 1948, Rau was state parliament delegate and Minister for Economic Planning of Brandenburg.

==== German Economic Commission ====
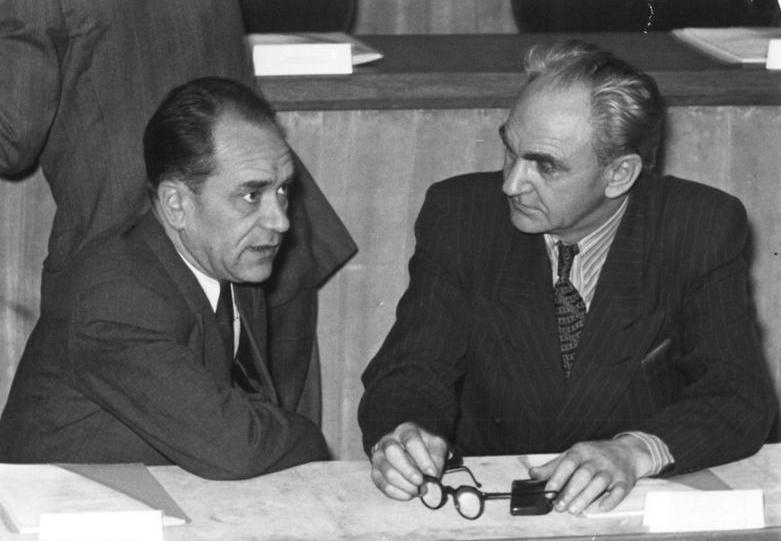
Rau (right) with Bruno Leuschner, one of his deputies at the DWK, 31 October 1951

In March 1948 Rau became chairman of the German Economic Commission (Deutsche Wirtschaftskommission or DWK), which during this period became the centralised administrative organisation for the Soviet Occupation Zone and the predecessor of the future East German government. (Note: Following a Soviet order in February 1948, the German Economic Commission became a "nascent state structure for all intents and purposes", with "competence ranging far beyond the economy proper" and it was granted power "to issue orders and directives to all German organs within the Soviet Occupation Zone".) The organisation existed during a time of very difficult challenges coming from different sides. A particularly momentous event during this time was the currency reform of 1948. On 20 June 1948 the western German zones introduced a new currency, leaving the eastern zone to use the old common currency. In order to avoid inflation, the DWK under Rau's leadership, was forced to follow quickly with its own reform and issued an own currency too. In doing so, the DWK also exploited the currency reform to redistribute capital by using different exchange rates for private and state-run companies. (Note: The exchange rate for state-run companies and very small saving accounts up to 100 Reichsmark (RM) was 1:1. The exchange rate for saving accounts up to 1000 RM was 5:1 and for private companies and not so small saving accounts 10:1. Rau's attempt to apply this rule to all private organized firms, including the then important Soviet owned bank 'Garantie- und Kreditbank AG', which managed the Soviet funds in the Soviet Occupation Zone, failed. After a sharp Soviet protest letter to Rau, this bank got an exchange rate of 1:1 too.) The disagreement, which of the two new currencies should be used in Berlin, triggered the Berlin Blockade by the USSR and the western airborne supply of West Berlin.

Under Rau's leadership the DWK, still under supervision of the Soviet Military Administration in Germany (German: Sowjetische Militäradministration in Deutschland or SMAD), quickly developed more and more into a partner of the SMAD with its own conceptions and intentions. This policy was also endorsed by the Soviet chief diplomat in Germany, Vladimir Semyonov, the future Chief Commissar of the USSR in Germany, who already in January 1948 correspondingly stated, that SMAD orders, (which accompanied DWK orders,) should have merely the purpose to back the authority of the German orders. One of Rau's aims during the meetings with the SMAD was, to come to agreements, which also obliged the Soviet side, including subordinate Soviet authorities, who still engaged in wild confiscations for reparation purposes. An important success in this direction was a half-year plan for the economic development in the second half of 1948, which was accepted by the SMAD in May 1948. It was followed by a likewise accepted two-year plan for 1949 and 1950.

The biggest obstacle to the plan's implementation soon proved to be the Berlin Blockade by the USSR, which was followed by a western counter-blockade of the Soviet occupation zone. As there were long-established economic ties between the western zone and the eastern, which was highly dependent on supplies from the West, the blockade was more damaging to the East. The West Berlin SPD newspaper Sozialdemokrat reported in April 1949, how Rau clearly criticized the blockade in a meeting of SED apparatchiks and there is reason to believe that he did the same in the meetings with the SMAD. According to the paper, Rau spoke of a "bad speculation" regarding the undervaluation of the dependence on western supplies, stating that the "broadminded Soviet help" turned out as insufficient and hinting that the blockade would soon be lifted. Finally the Berlin Blockade was lifted on 12 May 1949.

The DWK's increasingly centralised administration resulted in a substantial increase in its staffing level, which grew from about 5000 employees in mid-1948 to 10,000 by the beginning of 1949. In March 1949, Rau, like the representative of a state, signed a first treaty with a foreign state, a trade agreement with Poland.

=== 1949–1953 ===
==== Establishment and difficult first years of a new state ====
The time of Rau's German Economic Commission ended in October 1949 with the establishment of the East German state, the German Democratic Republic (GDR). The GDR was proclaimed on 7 October 1949, at a ceremony in the former Air Ministry Building in Berlin, until then the seat of Rau's organisation. Five days later, the DWK was formally abolished on 12 October 1949. Rau thereupon became a delegate of the People's Chamber representing East Berlin, the newly established parliament of the GDR and joined the new government.

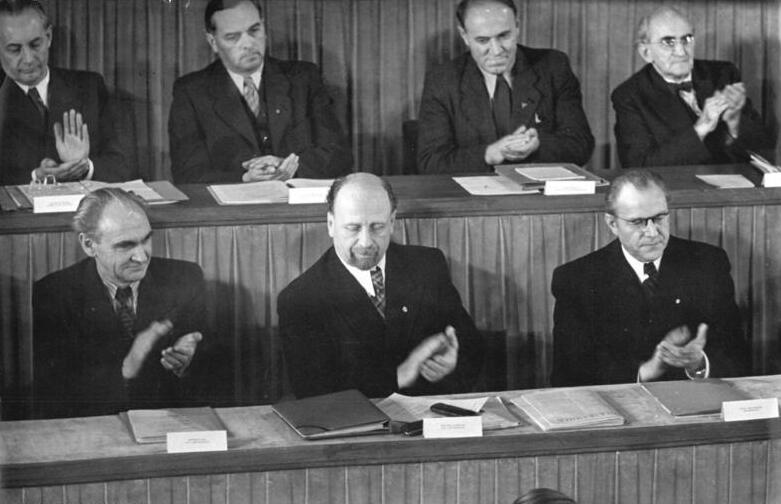
Leaders of the government: Rau (left) alongside Walter Ulbricht and Otto Grotewohl, 1 November 1951

Likewise in 1949, the ruling SED implemented traditional leadership structures of communist parties and Rau became a member of the newly established Central Committee of the SED and candidate member of its Politburo; in 1950 he became a full member of the Politburo as well as deputy chairman of the East German Council of Ministers. (Note: Chairman (prime minister) was Otto Grotewohl, the symbol figure of the merger into the SED. SED General Secretary Walter Ulbricht held also the post of the first deputy chairman. In cases, when both, Grotewohl and Ulbricht were abroad, for instance in Moscow, Rau, the 2nd deputy chairman, normally used to serve as the acting prime minister in this time. Beside Ulbricht and Rau there were three other deputy prime ministers, among them two representatives of the other parties in the National Front, who, according to Grotewohl in a talk with Joseph Stalin, were of no relevance. ("Comrade Grotewohl says that two of the five deputies are representatives of bourgeois parties, and we are glad that they do not do anything."))

Between 1949 and 1950, Rau was Minister for Planning of the GDR and in 1950–1952 chairman of the National Planning Commission. In this position, as the key figure of the economic development, Rau came into conflict with SED General Secretary Walter Ulbricht. In the face of an imminent economic collapse, Rau blamed the "Bureau Ulbricht" for the wrong policy. In response East Germany's old president Wilhelm Pieck renewed the old accusation of Trotskyism against Rau. In a later letter to Pieck of 28 November 1951, Rau protested at the manner in which the Secretariat usurped the Politburo by censoring his speech on economic affairs. (Note: Ulbricht, who led the Politburo in this time still as Primus inter pares, led also the Secretariat of the Central Committee. The CC Secretariat was the de facto second highest party body after the Politburo. Its task was, to lead the party apparatus according to the decisions by the Politburo. This included the important areas of agitation and propaganda and the party press. It was of particular importance, that the Secretariat was superior of the party cadres, including some – perhaps most – members of the Central Committee in their further party occupations. With the exception of a row of especially important positions, whose manning the Politburo expressively reserved, the Secretariat, in particular Ulbricht, could decide about the careers of the party cadres. The CC Secretariat was an important pillar of Ulbricht's power. Given his not very strong position in the Politburo, Ulbricht also managed in the early 1950s to expand the activities of the Secretariat – which was originally designed as a supporting body of the Politburo for typical party affairs – partly to government policy, a core responsibility of the Politburo. As a consequence, the Secretariat, which was now occasionally even by followers of Ulbricht nicknamed "Bureau Ulbricht", was increasingly seen as a rival of the Politburo. This situation led in 1953 within the Politburo to the demand to abolish the Secretariat. Shortly afterwards Ulbricht could consolidate his position in the Politburo and accepted, that the activities of the Secretariat, which had lost in value for Ulbricht, were widely narrowed to the original purpose again. (In later decades the character of the Secretariat changed once more. Since 1959 all CC Secretary posts were manned by members of the Politburo. Subsequently it became more and more usual, that the Politburo members were also CC Secretaries for their responsible areas, including the government policy. In these times most of the Politburo commissions for the diverse government areas, which were in part also discussion rounds, lost influence and the Politburo members often preferred now to use more the apparatus of the Secretariat for directives.))

In 1952–1953, Rau led the newly established Coordination Centre for Industry and Traffic at the East German Council of Ministers. The purpose of this office was effective control of the economy in order to overcome the difficulties, which were caused by a grown bureaucracy and unclear decision paths. Prime Minister Otto Grotewohl described this in a talk with Joseph Stalin.

After the death of Stalin in March 1953, the new collective Soviet leadership started to advocate a New Course. Moscow favored replacing East Germany's Stalinist party leader Walter Ulbricht and made inquiries about Rau as a potential candidate. (Note: Karl Schirdewan, who became in 1953 member of the Politburo, wrote, that Vladimir Semyonov, Moscow's representative in East Germany, asked him on 19 June 1953 about Ulbricht and Rau. According to Schirdewan, he responded (diplomatically) by favouring Ulbricht, but declared that in case of a needed change Rau would be the most promising candidate. (A few years later, Schirdewan himself became a new rival of Ulbricht and failed.)) In response, the leading SED party ideologist, Rudolf Herrnstadt, a candidate member of the Poliburo, with assistance from Rau drew up a concept for just such a New Course in East Germany. However, the workers' uprising, which was suppressed by the Soviet army on 17 June led to a backlash. Three weeks later, during a session of the then eight person Politburo (plus six candidate members) on 8 July 1953, Rau made a recommendation that Ulbricht be replaced, while Rau's Spanish Civil War comrade, Stasi chief Wilhelm Zaisser, who in Spain had been known as 'General Gómez', accused Ulbricht of having perverted the party. (Note: Prime Minister Otto Grotewohl, who seemed to keep out of the conflict, took some notes about a few single statements during the fevered meeting.) The majority was against Ulbricht. His only supporters were Hermann Matern and Erich Honecker. At that moment however there was no viable candidate who could replace Ulbricht immediately. (Note: Franz Dahlem, Ulbricht's main rival in the SED and since 1938 Rau's close fellow in Paris, Camp Vernet, Castres, the Prince Albrecht Street and the Mauthausen Concentration Camp, had already been deposed by Ulbricht a few months earlier, in connection with the Noel Field affair and the subsequent trials. (Three years later, in 1956, Dahlem was rehabilitated and shortly afterward among the first recipients of the new established Hans Beimler Medal, which he received during a ceremony supervised by Rau. Ironically Richard Staimer, a quite prominent person in the GDR and also a target of some speculations which claimed him to be Beimler's murderer, received the same medal on this occasion as well out of necessity – and had to accept it.)) Suggested were first Rudolf Herrnstadt and then Heinrich Rau, but both were hesitant, thus a decision was postponed. The very next day after the meeting Ulbricht went by plane to Moscow and the Soviet leadership, who in part also feared that deposing Ulbricht might be construed as a sign of weakness, now secured Ulbricht's position. (Note: Ulbricht found especially support by Nikita Khrushchev, who was at that time on the way to become 'Number ONE' in the collective Soviet leadership. It was also a stroke of luck for Ulbricht, that the USSR's ambitious Minister of Internal Affairs and chief of the Soviet secrete service Lavrentiy Beria, who practically was also a kind of supervisor of Ulbricht's counterpart, Stasi chief Wilhelm Zaisser, had been deposed and arrested a few days before. In the talk Ulbricht could easily mention this relationship, thus alluding to Zaisser as Beria's man. In consideration of Zaisser's rebellion it seems, that Ulbricht regarded the position of a strong Stasi chief now as a risk, which awoke in him the desire to lead and supervise the security organisations himself. Subsequently he initiated the foundation of a new Central Committee division for security, with the task of controlling the security forces and additionally the formation of a new superior security commission of the Politburo, which he led himself. In Ulbricht's time no other Stasi chief could become again member of the Politburo. In 1960 Ulbricht also converted his security commission into the National Defense Council of East Germany, an organisation with vast security competences outside the direct responsibility of the Politburo.) Subsequently, five members and candidate members of the Politburo lost their positions. (Note: The Central Committee of the SED, the by name highest party body between the Party Congresses, but de facto usually an acclamation body of its Politburo, had also officially the right, to ballot the members of the Politburo and of the Secretariat between the Party Congresses. But given the widespread custom, to see secret voting as a sign of dangerous bourgeois falderal, it was usual to accept always the proposals by the Politburo. But during the following 15th session of the Central Committee, which was also attended by high Soviet officials, among them Mikhail Suslov, and which saw sharp attacks by Ulbricht against some other Politburo members, especially against Herrnstadt and Zaisser, all was different and the members of the Central Committee didn't elect those rebels, who were especially a target of Ulbricht's attacks. Never before and never again in the SED history, it happened, that apparatchiks, nominated for election by the Politburo itself, were not subsequently also elected by the Central Committee!. In this Central Committee session Ulbricht could consolidate his position in the Politburo and the Central Committee confirmed also his rank as head of the party. It was merely cosmetics, that, according to the Soviet example, his post of 'General Secretary' was now renamed to 'First Secretary'. Btw., four years later Soviet leader Khrushchev could use the experiences from 1953 and succeeded in securing his own position in a similar way.)

=== 1953–1961 ===
==== Competition in the Politburo and economic reform ====
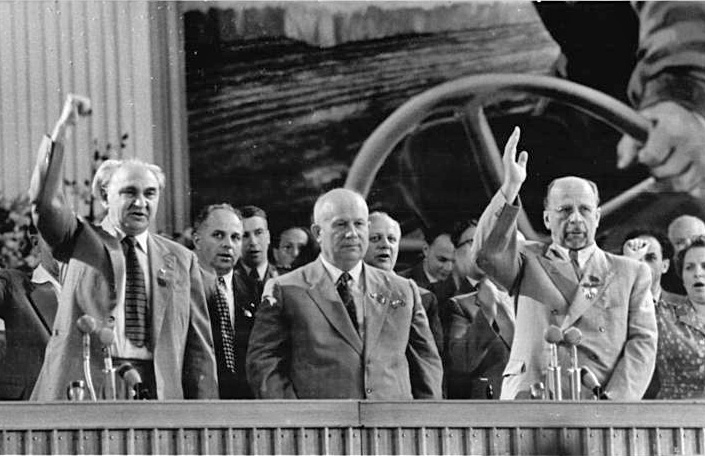
Displayed harmony: Rau (left) alongside Nikita Khrushchev and Walter Ulbricht at the SED's 5th Party Congress, 11 July 1958

Unlike some other rebels in the leadership, Rau kept most of his positions. He remained a member of the Politburo and deputy chairman of the Council of Ministers. In the Politburo he continued to be responsible for the industry of the GDR. However, his position had been weakened. Bruno Leuschner, a follower of Ulbricht and Rau's successor as chairman of the National Planning Commission, now became a new candidate member of the Politburo. During the ensuing period, Leuschner, often supported by Ulbricht, gradually superseded Rau as the senior leader for the economy as a whole. The official GDR press never mentioned the dissension between Rau and Leuschner and always described their cooperation as a success story. (Note: One base source for conflicts between Rau and Leuschner became Fritz Schenk, Bruno Leuschners personal assistant during this time, who fled in 1957 to West Germany, where he became a vehement critic of the SED rule. He depicted Leuschner's internal remarks then.)

Concentrating on his tasks in the SED leadership and as a minister, Rau – despite occasional internal criticism – avoided giving the impression of any disagreement with Ulbricht, at least in public. In 1954, Rau received in the Order of Merit for the Fatherland (Vaterländischer Verdienstorden) in gold. Later, Ulbricht stated in a 1964 interview about the "introduction of socialism" in the GDR, that only three people were heavily involved in the economic development during that time, "namely Heinrich Rau, Bruno Leuschner and me. Others were not consulted!"

In 1953–1955 Rau led the new established Ministry for Machine Construction, which combined the responsibilities of three existing ministries. (Note: The three ministries, which merged into the Ministry for Machine Construction were the Ministries for Heavy Machine Construction, for General Machine Construction, and for Transport and Agricultural Machine Construction.) His deputy in this ministry was Erich Apel, who would, in the early 1960s, become an initiator and architect of an economic reform, which became known as the New Economic System (NES). This later reform was presaged by a reform in the middle of the 1950s; the economic historian Jörg Roesler considers the NES in the 1960s as a continuation of this reform. The origin of the reform in the 1950s was a scientific study, commissioned by Rau's ministry in 1953, to assess the need for greater economic efficiency in the factories. The subsequent results from this study promised enhanced economic efficiency by shifting more responsibility from the National Planning Commission to the enterprises themselves. Thenceforward, already in spring 1954, Rau advocated such a planning reform, while planning boss Bruno Leuschner quite consistently opposed it. In August 1954, Rau's ministry sent a concept for such a reform to Leuschner's State Planning Commission. Eventually this reform got under way, after Ulbricht, perhaps under the influence of his new personal economic adviser Wolfgang Berger, had approved such a policy at the end of 1954 too. Subsequently, the reform accelerated until 1956. It found however its early end in the generally aggravated political atmosphere in 1957. Unrests in other Eastern Bloc countries during the previous year 1956, in particular in Hungary, had awoken the desire for more central control again. The subsequent unsatisfying economic development, however, during the following years eventually led in the 1960s to the concept of a new planning reform, the NES.

==== Foreign trade and foreign policy ====
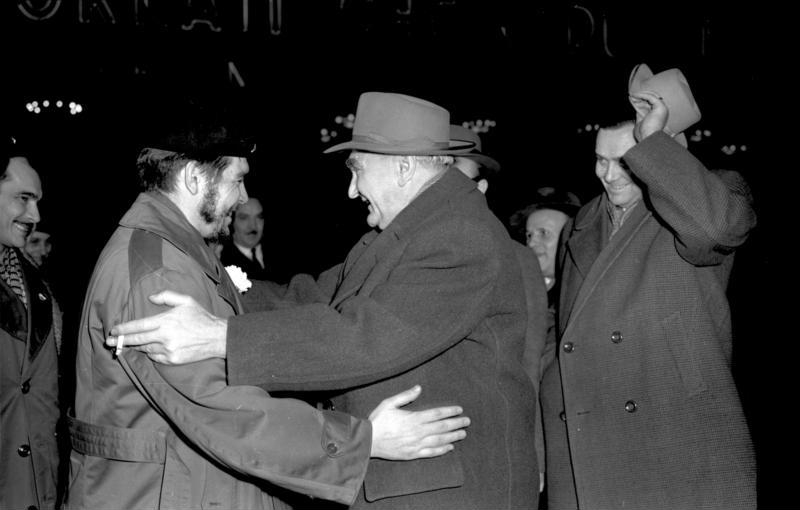
Rau (right) with Che Guevara in East Berlin, 17 December 1960

Between 1955 and 1961 Rau served as Minister for Foreign Trade and Inter-German Trade. The term "Inter-German Trade" meant the trade with West Germany. In this time both German states still saw German reunification as their own aim, but both envisaging different political systems. The West German position was that they, as the only freely elected government, had an exclusive mandate for the entire German people. In consequence of this, the GDR's official diplomatic relationships with other states were narrowed to the states of the Eastern Bloc. Practically no other states recognized the GDR. As a result, Rau's ministry established numerous new "trade missions" in other states, which served as a kind of surrogate for nonexistent embassies. (Note: The term "trade mission" was a GDR invention, for the purpose of displaying a diplomatic touch and to delete the word 'trade' later easily, when possible.) It was a corollary, that Rau, in addition to his responsibility for the export-oriented industry, also chaired the Foreign Policy Commission of the SED Politburo (Außenpolitische Kommission beim Politbüro or APK) since 1955, in this period the actual decision-making body for foreign affairs, and visited other states in different parts of the world in this capacity. (Note: The de facto highest decision-making body for all kinds of affairs in the GDR was the Politburo, which usually followed the proposals of its respectively responsible member for a field (other members could also assume, that especially important proposals had been discussed with Ulbricht in advance.) The person responsible for foreign policy was Rau. The decision-making body for day-to-day foreign policy was the Central Committee Division for Foreign Policy and International Relations (APIV), whose leading members were, beside experts from other fields, also members of Rau's superior Foreign Policy Commission of the SED Politburo (APK), which had the task of coordination of the diverse political responsibilities and preparation of material for decisions by the Politburo. The Minister for Foreign Affairs of the GDR held a de facto subordinate position at this time and had follow the directives of the SED bodies. However, in consideration of the quite prestigious view of this office, and in order to display a democratic variety, the appointed foreign minister used to be until 1965 a member of the non-SED parties in the National Front. The exception during this period was Anton Ackermann, who was a candidate member of the Politburo and the first chairman of the in 1953 new established APK. He led the foreign ministry in 1953 for a brief time himself, after the foreign minister Georg Dertinger, a member of the Christian Democratic Union (East Germany) (CDU), had been arrested for suspected espionage.) Among the visited states were, beside the core states of the Soviet Bloc, also then Eastern Bloc peripheral states, like China and Albania and leading states of the crystallizing Non-Aligned Movement like India and Yugoslavia (after the Bandung Conference). Between 1955 and 1957 he visited, as part of a diplomatic advertisement campaign in the Arab world, various Arabic states, among them repeatedly Egypt. One of his last deals, which he closed as minister, was a trade agreement with Cuba, signed by Cuba's minister Ernesto 'Che' Guevara, on 17 December 1960 in East Berlin.

Rau, in poor health during his final years, died of a heart attack in East Berlin, in March 1961. He was cremated and honoured with burial at the Memorial to the Socialists (German: Gedenkstätte der Sozialisten) in the Friedrichsfelde Central Cemetery, Berlin.

== Aftermath and legacy ==
After his death, firms, schools, recreation homes, numerous streets, and a fighter squadron were named after him. The GDR issued a stamp with his picture three times.

Rau was married twice and had three sons and a daughter. Like the other members of the Politburo, he lived until 1960 in a secured area of East Berlin's district Pankow and moved in 1960 to the Waldsiedlung near Wandlitz. In Pankow he had lived in Majakowskiring no. 50. In 1963, Rau's widow Elisabeth moved to this street again.

When the prominent West German SPD politician and future President of Germany Johannes Rau visited an SPD rally in the East German city of Erfurt during the time of German reunification, he was introduced as "Prime Minister 'Heinrich Rau'". Thereupon Johannes Rau ironically commented on this lapse by observing that Heinrich Rau was a "Minister of Trade, a Swabian and a communist" and he was none of the three.

== Awards and honors ==
- 1954: Patriotic Order of Merit in Gold
- 1955: VdgB Badge of Honor
- 1955: Golden Honorary Badge of the Chamber of Technology
- 1956: Hans Beimler Medal
- 1958: Banner of Labor
- 1958: Medal for Fighters Against Fascism
- 1958: Medal for Participation in the Struggles from 1918 to 1923
- 1958: Order of the National Flag, 1st Class
- 1959: Hero of Labor
- 1961: Order of the Nile, Grand Cordon

== See also ==
- International Brigades order of battle
- East German mark
- Hallstein Doctrine
- History of East Germany

== Notes and references ==
=== Bibliography ===
- Amos, Heike (2003a). "Rau, Heinrich". Neue deutsche Biographie (in German). Vol. 21. Berlin: Duncker & Humblot. p. 192. ISBN 3-428-00181-8.
- Amos, Heike (2003). Politik und Organisation der SED-Zentrale 1949–1963 (in German). Münster: Lit Verlag. ISBN 3-8258-6187-2.
- Bauerkämper, Arnd (2002). Ländliche Gesellschaft in der kommunistischen Diktatur: Zwangsmodernissierung und Tradition in Brandenburg 1945-1963 (in German). Köln: Böhlau. ISBN 3-412-16101-2.
- Berlin, Jörg, ed. (1979). Die deutsche Revolution 1918/19: Quellen und Dokumente (in German). Köln: Pahl-Rugenstein. ISBN 3-7609-0391-6.
- Bock, Siegfried; Ingrid, Muth; Hermann, Schwiesau (2004). DDR-Aussenpolitik im Rückspiegel (in German). Münster: Lit Verlag. ISBN 3-8258-7539-3.
- Broszat, Martin; Herrmann, Weber; Gerhard, Braas (1993). SBZ Handbuch (in German). München: R. Oldenbourg Verlag GmbH. ISBN 3-486-55262-7.
- Brun-Zechovoj, Valerij (1999). Manfred Stern – General Kleber (in German). Berlin: Trafo Verlag. ISBN 3-89626-175-4. / Summary: "Manfred Stern – General Kleber". Archived from the original on 2011-10-02.
- Degras, Jane, ed. (1956). The Communist International, 1919–1943: Documents. Vol. 1. London: Oxford University Press.
- Diedrich, Torsten; Kowalczuk, Ilko-Sascha, eds. (2005). Staatsgründung auf Raten? (in German). Berlin: Ch. Links Verlag. ISBN 3-86153-380-4.
- von Ditfurth, Christian (1998). Ostalgie oder linke Alternative. Meine Reise durch die PDS (in German). Köln: Kiepenheuer und Witsch. ISBN 3-462-02706-9.
- Dunin-Wąsowicz, Krzysztof (1982). Resistance in the Nazi concentration camps, 1933–1945. PWN-Polish Scientific Publishers. ISBN 83-01-02989-7.
- Engel, Carlos (1999). Historia de las Brigadas Mixtas del E. P. de la República (in Spanish). Madrid: Almena Ediciones. ISBN 84-922644-7-0.
- Foitzik, Jan (1999). Sowjetische Militäradministration in Deutschland (SMAD) (in German). Berlin: Akademie Verlag. ISBN 3-05-002680-4.
- Gere, Edwin (2003). The Unheralded: Men and Women of the Berlin Blockade and Airlift. Victoria: Trafford. ISBN 1-55369-885-1.
- Gray, William Glenn (2003). Germany's cold war. University of North Carolina Press. ISBN 0-8078-2758-4.
- Grieder, Peter (1999). The East German leadership 1946–73. Manchester: Manchester University Press. ISBN 0-7190-5498-2.
- Hangen, Welles (1966). The muted revolution: East Germany's challenge to Russia and the West. New York: Alfred A. Knopf. (Contemporary description of the New Economic System, published in 1966. The author received the 1966's Cornelius Ryan Award for this book.)
- Hoffmann, Dierk (2000). Hoffmann, Dierk; Wentker, Hermann (eds.). Das letzte Jahr der SBZ [The last year of the Soviet Occupation Zone] (in German). München: Oldenbourg Wissenschaftsverlag. pp. 101–102. ISBN 3-486-64506-4.
- Jackson, Michael W. (1994). The Fallen Sparrows: The International Brigades in the Spanish Civil War. Philadelphia: The American Philosophical Society. p. 107. ISBN 0-87169-212-0. "Moreover Trotsky's followers 500 executions."
- Karlsch, Rainer (1993). Allein bezahlt? (in German). Ch. Links Verlag. ISBN 3-86153-054-6.
- Kohlhaas, Wilhelm (1967). Chronik der Stadt Stuttgart. Volume 16: 1913–1918. Veröffentlichungen des Archivs der Stadt Stuttgart (in German). Stuttgart: Ernst Klett Verlag. pp. 199–209.
- Kohlhaas, Wilhelm (1964). Chronik der Stadt Stuttgart. Volume 17: 1918–1933. Veröffentlichungen des Archivs der Stadt Stuttgart (in German). Stuttgart: Ernst Klett Verlag. pp. 1–24.
- Krammer, Arnold (1969). "The Thaelmann Brigade". Journal of Contemporary History. 4 (2). SAGE Publications: 65. doi:10.1177/002200946900400204. S2CID 153599280.
- Lazitch, Branko; Drachkovitch, Milorad M. (1986). BIOGRAPHICAL DICTIONARY OF THE COMINTERN. Stanford: Hoover Institution – Stanford University. ISBN 0-8179-8401-1.
- Loth, Wilfried (2002). Stalin's unwanted children. New York: Palgrave Macmillan. ISBN 0-333-71657-4.
- Lustiger, Arno (1989). Shalom Libertad! (PDF) (in German). Frankfurt am Main: Athäneum Verlag. ISBN 3-610-08529-0.
- Marx, Karl; Engels, Friedrich (2004). Karl Marx, Frederick Engels: Collected Works. Volume 50: Engels 1892–95. New York: International Publishers. pp. 182–183. ISBN 0-7178-0550-6.
- Mathias, Jörg (2004). Regional interests in Europe: Wales and Saxony as modern regions. London: Frank Cass Publishers. p. 65. ISBN 0-7146-8467-8.
- McCauley, Martin (1983). The German Democratic Republic since 1945. London: Palgrave Macmillan. ISBN 0-333-26219-0.
- McLellan, Josie (2004). Antifascism and memory in East Germany. Oxford: Oxford University Press. ISBN 0-19-927626-9.
- Michel, Alexander (1996). Hans Pohl (ed.). Von der Fabrikzeitung zum Führungsmittel. Beiträge zur Unternehmensgeschichte (in German). Vol. 96. Stuttgart: Franz Steiner Verlag. pp. 217–220. ISBN 3-515-07210-1.
- Muth, Ingrid (2001). Die DDR-Aussenpolitik 1949–1972 (in German). Berlin: Ch. Links Verlag. ISBN 3-86153-224-7.
- Niemetz, Daniel (2006). Das feldgraue Erbe: die Wehrmachteinflüsse im Militär der SBZ/DDR (in German). Berlin: Ch. Links Verlag. ISBN 3-86153-421-5.
- Osterman, Christian (2001). Uprising in East Germany, 1953. New York: Central European University Press. ISBN 963-9241-17-2.
- Roesler, Jörg (2006). "Planungsreform unter günstigen und ungünstigen Bedingungen". In Prokop, Siegfried (ed.). Zwischen Aufbruch und Abbruch: Die DDR im Jahre 1956. Zeitgeschichte (in German). Vol. 41 (1st ed.). Berlin: Kai Homilius. pp. 88–95. ISBN 3-89706-853-2.
- Roesler, Jörg (September 2008). "Zwei Währungsreformen im besetzten Deutschland" (PDF). UTOPIE Kreativ (in German) (215): 821.
- Schalck-Golodkowski, Alexander (2000). Deutsch-deutsche Erinnerungen (in German). Berlin: Rowohlt. ISBN 3-498-06330-8.
- Schenk, Fritz (1962). Im Vorzimmer der Diktatur (in German). Köln: Kiepenheuer & Witsch.
- Schirdewan, Karl (1994). Aufstand gegen Ulbricht (in German). Aufbau Taschenbuch Verlag. ISBN 3-7466-8008-5.
- Schöneburg, Karl-Heinz, ed. (1976). Revolutionärer Prozess und Staatsentstehung (in German). East Berlin: Akademie Verlag.
- Schulze, Hans-Michael (2010). Das Pankower Städtchen: Ein historischer Rundgang (PDF) (in German). Berlin: Ch. Links Verlag. ISBN 978-3-86153-599-7.
- Schumann, Silke (2003). Anatomie der Staatssicherheit/MfS-Handbuch, Teil III/20 (PDF) (in German). Berlin: Federal Commissioner for the Stasi Records.
- Thomas, Hugh (1977). The Spanish Civil War. New York: Harper and Row. ISBN 0-06-014278-2.
- Weber, Hermann (1999). Geschichte der DDR (in German). Münschen: Deutscher Taschenbuchverlag. ISBN 3-89996-026-2.
- Weber, Hermann; Herbst, Andreas (2008). Deutsche Kommunisten. Biographisches Handbuch 1918 bis 1945 (in German). Berlin: Karl Dietz. ISBN 978-3-320-02130-6.
- Weitz, Eric D. (1997). Creating German communism, 1890–1990. New Jersey: Princeton University Press. ISBN 0-691-02594-0.
- Woitinas, Erich (1977). Heinrich Rau. Schriftenreihe zur Geschichte der FDJ (in German). Vol. 36. East Berlin: Junge Welt Verlag.
