= 2nd Council of Ministers of the German Democratic Republic =

Government of the German Democratic Republic

Third cabinet of Otto Grotewohl Cabinet Grotewohl III
- 2nd government of the German Democratic Republic

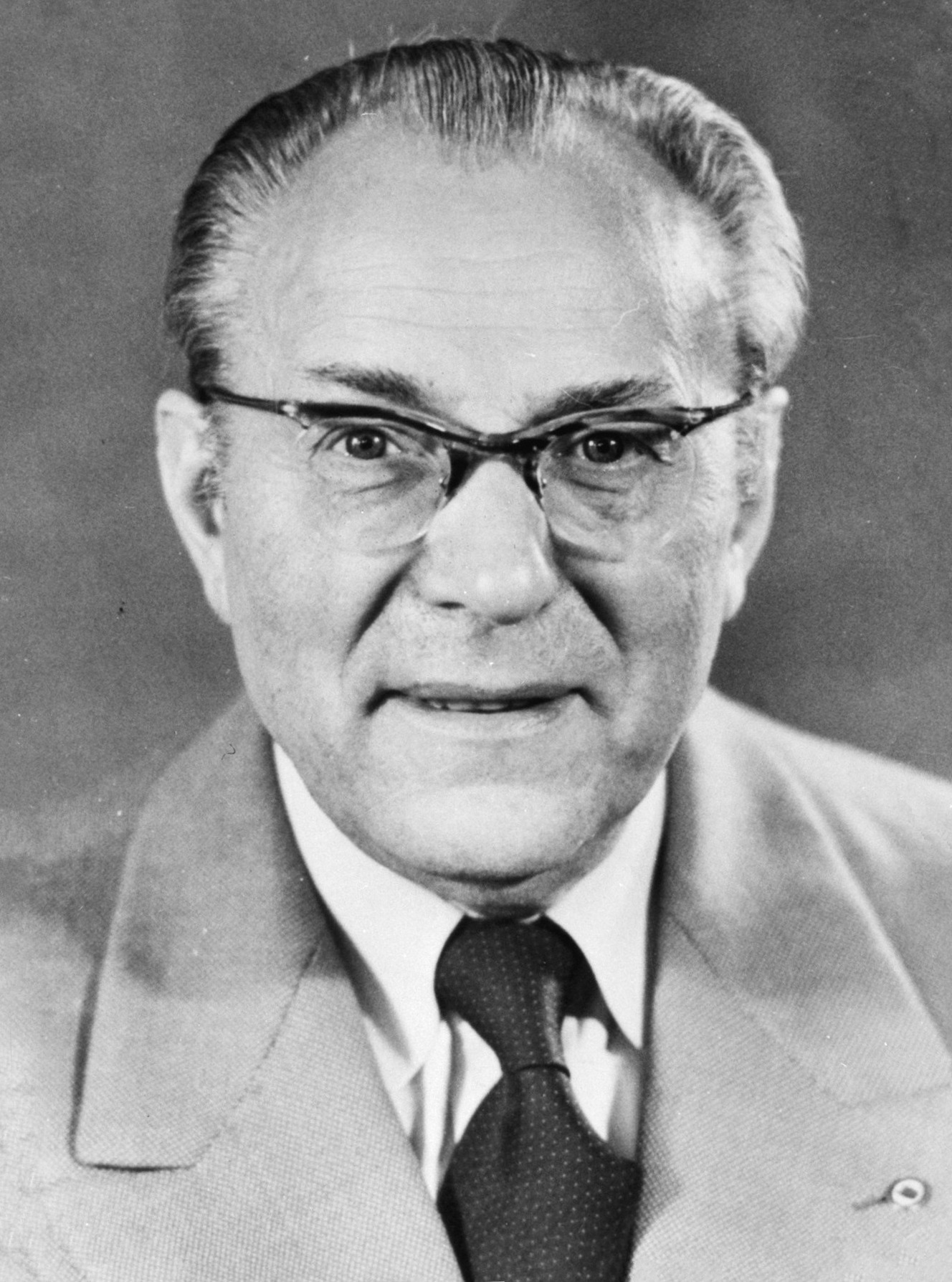
- Date formed: 19 November 1954
- Date dissolved: 7 December 1958

People and organisations
- President: Wilhelm Pieck
- Minister-President: Otto Grotewohl
- No. of ministers: 15

History
- Predecessor: Grotewohl II
- Successor: Grotewohl IV

The following overview lists the ministers and state secretaries of the GDR government at the beginning of the government period.

== Ministries ==
The government consisted of:

Portfolio	Minister	Took office	Left office	Party
Minister-President	Otto Grotewohl	19 November 1954	7 December 1958	SED
First Deputy Minister-President	Walter Ulbricht	24 November 1955	7 December 1958	SED
Deputy Minister-President	Walter Ulbricht	19 November 1954	24 November 1955	SED
Deputy Minister-President	Otto Nuschke	19 November 1954	7 December 1958	CDU
Deputy Minister-President	Heinrich Rau	19 November 1954	7 December 1958	SED
Deputy Minister-President	Hans Loch	19 November 1954	7 December 1958	LDPD
Deputy Minister-President	Lothar Bolz	19 November 1954	7 December 1958	NDPD
Deputy Minister-President	Paul Scholz	19 November 1954	7 December 1958	DBD
Deputy Minister-President	Willi Stoph	19 November 1954	7 December 1958	SED
Deputy Minister-President	Fred Oelßner	18 January 1956	13 February 1958	SED
Deputy Minister-President	Fritz Selbmann	24 November 1955	13 February 1958	SED
Deputy Minister-President	Fred Oelßner	18 January 1956	7 December 1958	SED
Ministry of Agriculture and Forestry	Paul Scholz	19 November 1954	19 March 1955	DBD
Ministry of Agriculture and Forestry	Hans Reichelt	20 March 1955	7 December 1958	DBD
Ministry of Construction	Heinz Winkler	19 November 1954	15 February 1958	NDPD
Ministry of Finance	Hans Loch	19 November 1954	24 November 1955	LDPD
Ministry of Finance	Willy Rumpf	24 November 1955	7 December 1958	SED
Ministry of Foreign Affairs	Lothar Bolz	19 November 1954	7 December 1958	NDPD
Ministry of Heavy Industry	Fritz Selbmann	19 November 1954	24 November 1955	SED
Ministry of the Interior	Willi Stoph	19 November 1954	12 August 1955	SED
Ministry of the Interior	Karl Maron	12 August 1955	7 December 1958	SED
Ministry of Justice	Hilde Benjamin	19 November 1954	7 December 1958	SED
Ministry for Labor and Vocational Training	Frederick Macher	19 November 1954	15 February 1958	SED
Ministry of Light Industry	William Feldman	19 November 1954	15 February 1958	NDPD
Ministry of Mechanical Engineering	Heinrich Rau	19 November 1954	15 April 1955	SED
Minister of Post and Telecommunications	Friedrich Burmeister	19 November 1954	7 December 1958	CDU
Ministry of Public Education	Fritz Lange	19 November 1954	7 December 1958	SED
Minister of State Security	Ernst Wollweber	19 November 1954	31 October 1957	SED
Minister of State Security	Ernst Wollweber	11 December 1957	7 December 1958	SED
Ministry of Trade and Supply	Curt Wach	19 November 1954	7 December 1958	SED
Ministry of Transport	Erwin Kramer	19 November 1954	7 December 1958	SED
Ministry of Health	Luitpold Steidle	19 November 1954	7 December 1958	CDU

== Ministry-level Committees ==
Portfolio	Minister	Took office	Left office	Party
Chairman of the State Planning Commission	Bruno Leuschner	19 November 1954	7 December 1958	SED
First Deputy Chairman of the State Planning Commission	Margarete Wittkowski	19 November 1954	7 December 1958	SED
State Secretary at the Committee for German Unity	Albert Norden	19 November 1954	7 December 1958	SED

== Sources ==
- Herbert Hömig (1985). "Loch, Hans". Neue Deutsche Biographie (in German). Vol. 14. Berlin: Duncker & Humblot. pp. 742–743. (full text online).
- Wer war wer in der DDR?
- Carl Steinhoff: erster DDR-Innenminister : Wandlungen eines bürgerlichen Sozialisten / Lutz Maeke
- "BIOGRAPHISCHE DATENBANKEN". election.de (in German).
- Gesetz über die Regierung der DDR: Online-Veröffentlichung, retrieved 10 January 2018
- Gesetz über die Bildung eines Ministeriums für Staatssicherheit: http://www.verfassungen.de/de/ddr/mfsbildung50.htm Online-Veröffentlichung, retrieved 10 January 2018.

Government offices
Preceded by Grotewohl I	Cabinets of the German Democratic Republic; 19 November 1954–7 December 1958	Succeeded by Grotewohl III
