= Bob Drogin =

American journalist (born 1952)

- Born: March 29, 1952 (age 73)
- Education: Oberlin College (BA); Columbia School of Journalism (MA)
- Occupations: Journalist, author
- Notable credit(s): Pulitzer Prize for Public Service, Cornelius Ryan Award

Bob Drogin (born March 29, 1952) is an American journalist and author. He worked for the Los Angeles Times, for nearly four decades. Drogin began his career with the Times as a national correspondent, based in New York, traveling to nearly every state in the United States. He spent eight years as a foreign correspondent, and as bureau chief in Manila and Johannesburg, before returning to the U.S. He covered intelligence and national security in the Washington bureau, from 1998 until retiring in November 2020.

Drogin has won a number of awards during his career, including the Pulitzer Prize for Public Service, and two prizes for his book Curveball: Spies, Lies, and the Con Man Who Caused a War, the story of the Iraqi informant known as Curveball, who was a key source of false claims about Iraq and weapons of mass destruction (WMD).

== Background and education ==
Drogin is a graduate of Oberlin College, class of 1973, with a degree in Asian studies. Halfway into his sophomore year, he traveled to Japan, to study for a semester as a participant in "the Experiment in International living," a family stay program. After the semester was finished, he spent time in a Zen monastery in Kyoto, for a short period, and then traveled in Japan.

Following his time in Japan, Drogin spent a year traveling throughout Asia, spending time in Laos; Cambodia; Thailand; Malaysia; Indonesia; Burma; Nepal; India; Pakistan; Iran, and Turkey. Following his travels, Drogin visited Europe, and then returned to the U.S., and after finishing at Oberlin, he applied to Columbia Graduate School of Journalism, Johns Hopkins School of Advanced International Studies, and as an applicant for a Oberlin Shansi fellowship.

Drogin was accepted for the fellowship, and returned to Indonesia, for two years, working for UNICEF, as a Shansi representative. Drogin lived in Jakarta, supporting himself on the income from the fellowship and the pay from UNICEF. After receiving training and studying the language, he traveled often, as part of the nutritional division. Upon completion of his two-year commitment, he returned to the U.S., where he was accepted into Columbia, and graduated with a master's degree in journalism.

== Career ==
As a student at Oberlin College, Drogin worked for a year as the managing editor of the school newspaper, the Review. During the winter session of his senior year, he worked as an intern at the Lorain Journal. He spent January covering the police, and during the rest of the year, he worked weekend nights, 3-midnight, as a "cop reporter."

After graduating from Columbia, he worked as a freelance photographer for a New York agency, Magnum Photos, where he covered a presidential election, prizefights and other events for various magazines. Drogin, decided he did not want to work as a photographer, so he took a job with The Charlotte Observer, where he remained for 2 1/2 years.

After leaving the Observer, he returned to Cambodia with UNICEF, and served for six-months as the deputy director for Relief on the Cambodian border. This was during the time of Killing fields of Khmer.

After returning to the U.S., Drogin worked for two years at The Philadelphia Inquirer, and was awarded the 1981 Pulitzer Prize, for his previous work at The Charlotte Observer. In 1983, he left to join Los Angeles Times.

Drogin began his work at the Los Angeles Times as a national correspondent based in New York City. He traveled to nearly every state and covered the 1984 and 1988 presidential campaigns. He subsequently moved overseas as a foreign correspondent, serving for eight years, as bureau chief in Manila and Johannesburg. He reported on Nelson Mandela's election as president of South Africa, the genocide in Rwanda, the Gulf War, and other news from countries in Asia, Africa and the Middle East. He returned to Washington in 1998, working as the Deputy Bureau Chief until retiring in November 2020.

He is the author of the 2007 book, Curveball: Spies, Lies, and the Con Man Who Caused a War, which describes the role of Curveball, the Iraqi informant who was a key source for false claims that Saddam Hussein had weapons of mass destruction. in 2007, Drogin was awarded the Cornelius Ryan Award, by the Overseas Press Club of America, for best non-fiction book on international affairs, and the Investigative Reporters and Editors book prize, for Curveball.

== Awards and recognition ==
Drogin has won or shared numerous journalism prizes, including Robert F. Kennedy Journalism Awards, and a George Polk Award. Some of the awards are listed below.

- 1981 Winner, The Pulitzer Prize in Public Service, staff of the Charlotte Observer, for its series: "Brown Lung A Case of Deadly Neglect"
- 1997–98 John S. Knight Fellow at Stanford University
- 2001 Winner, Hal Boyle Award, Overseas Press Club, staff of the Los Angeles Times, for "Inside Al Qaeda"
- 2002 Finalist, Goldsmith Prize for Investigative Reporting, with Josh Meyer, Craig Pyes, William C. Rempel, and Sebastian Rotella, for "Revealing Terrorism," Los Angeles Times
- 2006 Media Fellow at the Hoover Institution at Stanford
- 2007 Winner, Overseas Press Club of America, Cornelius Ryan Award, for best non-fiction book on international affairs, Curveball: Spies, Lies, and the Con Man Who Caused a War
- 2007 Winner, Investigative Reporters and Editors book prize for Curveball: Spies, Lies, and the Con Man Who Caused a War

== Selected works ==
=== Articles ===
- "Fads, Fashion and Foolery for 1994, Tower of Babble: One if the many unanswered questions about South Africa's transition to black majority rule after the first democratic elections next April 27 is fairly basic: How will people communicate?" Los Angeles Times, January 4, 1994.
- "Jakarta Dispatch: Riady's Bank Shot," The New Republic, August 11, 1997.
- "The Vanishing–What happened to Saddam's weapons of mass destruction? Iraqi scientists offer an explanation," The New Republic, July 21, 2003.
- "Friendly Fire–The White House cites the Kay report as proof that Saddam Hussein had an active WMD program that threatened the United States and the World. The truth is exactly the reverse: The Kay report demolishes President Bush's prewar WMD claims. And David Kay seems to know it." The New Republic, October 27, 2003.
- "Determining the Reliability of a Key CIA Source," Neiman Foundation at Harvard University, Neiman reports, 62, no. 1, 2008.

=== Books ===
- "False records cited: alarms still ring loud at 3 Mile Island," co-authored with Robert A. Rosenblatt, National Emergency Training Center, 1984.
- "Mad Dash for a Share of Billions in Ravaged Kuwaiti City, Businessmen Scramble for Reconstruction Contracts. Some Bring Sleeping Bags: For One Executive, the Dress Code is Still Coat, Tie and Tasseled Loafers," in conjunction with the Los Angeles Times (firm), Los Angeles Times,1991.
- Curveball: Spies, Lies, and the Con Man Who Caused a War, Random House, 2007.
