= Katherine Eban =

American journalist and author (born 1966/1967)

- Born: Katherine Eban Finkelstein; 1966 or 1967 (age 58–59)
- Education: Brown University (BA); University of Oxford (Mphil); University of East Anglia (MA)
- Occupations: Journalist, author
- Employer: Rolling Stone
- Spouse: B. Kenneth Levenson II

Katherine Eban (born 1966 or 1967) is an American investigative journalist and author. She is the national investigative correspondent for Rolling Stone, a contributor at Fortune and Vanity Fair, and writes for a variety of other national magazines. Her work has focused on public health and homeland security issues.

== Career ==
Eban has written two books. Dangerous Doses: How Counterfeiters are Contaminating America's Drug Supply was one of the best books of 2005 according to Kirkus Reviews. In 2019, she published Bottle of Lies: The Inside Story of the Generic Drug Boom. She has received grants from the Alfred P. Sloan Foundation to support her books. Bottle of Lies won the Cornelius Ryan Award from the Overseas Press Club of America.

The 2019 film The Report is partly inspired by Eban's "Rorschach and Awe" article in Vanity Fair.

In 2020, Eban's book Bottle of Lies: The Inside Story of the Generic Drug Boom won the Science in Society Book Award from the National Association of Science Writers.

In 2026, Eban became Rolling Stone's National Investigative Correspondent.

== Personal life ==
Eban's father is a corporate lawyer, and her mother is a professor at the Yale School of Drama. Eban holds degrees from Brown University, the University of East Anglia, and the University of Oxford, where she was a Rhodes Scholar. She is an Andrew Carnegie fellow.

In 2002, Eban married B. Kenneth Levenson II in a Jewish ceremony at the Angel Orensanz Center in Manhattan.

== Bibliography ==
=== Books ===
- Dangerous Doses: How Counterfeiters Are Contaminating America's Drug Supply. Orlando, Fla.: Harcourt. 2005.
- Bottle of Lies: The Inside Story of the Generic Drug Boom. New York: Ecco. 2019.

=== Essays and reporting ===
- Eban, Katherine (July–August 2021). "Viral inflection". Vanity Fair. Vol. 730. Additional reporting by Lili Pike; research assistance from Stan Friedman. pp. 92–97, 126–131.
