= Käte Selbmann =

German politician (1906–1962)

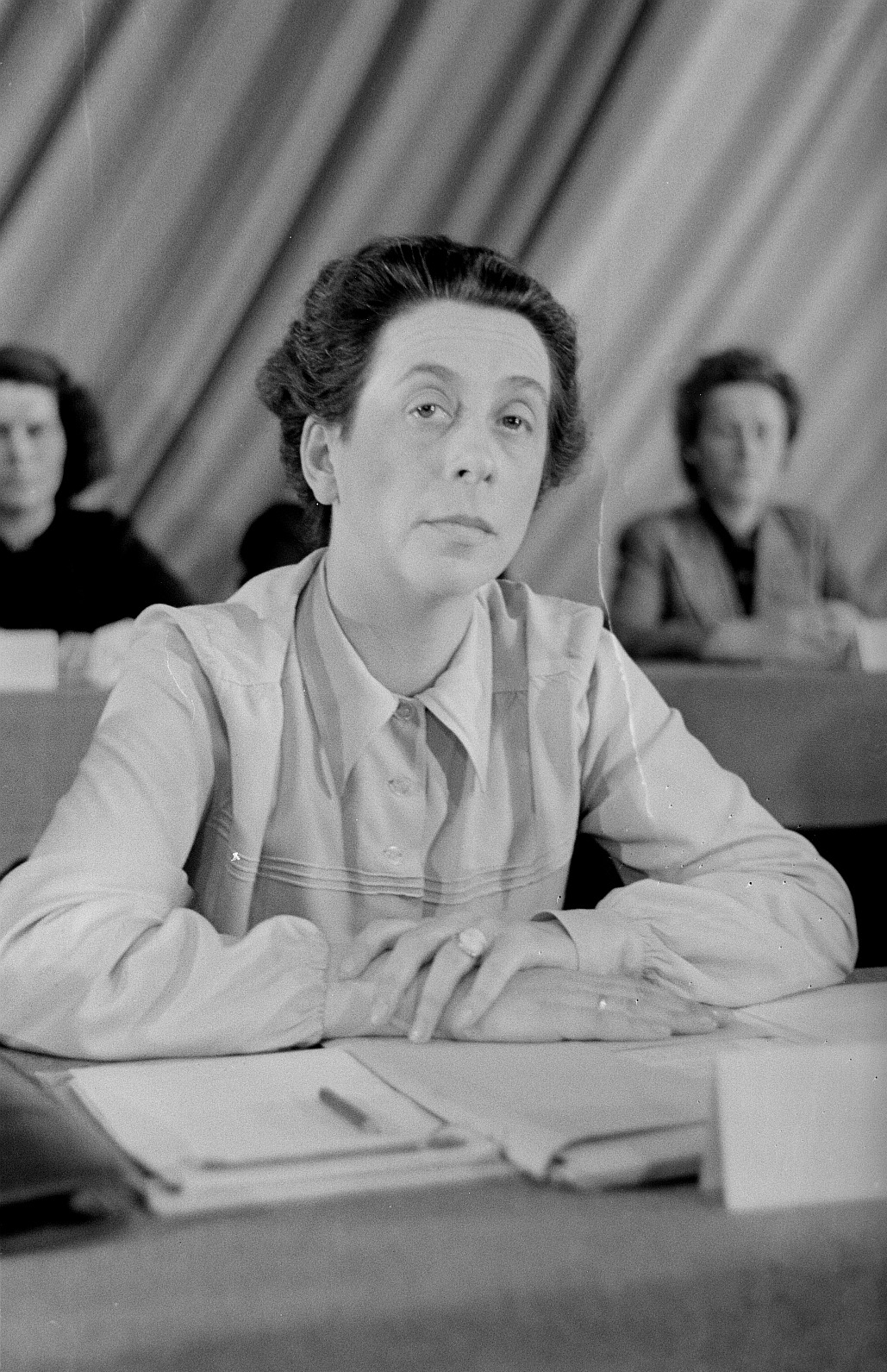
- Selbmann in 1950

Member of the Volkskammer for Teltow and Potsdam
- In office 15 October 1950 – 17 October 1954

Personal details
- Born: Käte Müller; 17 February 1906 Berlin, Kingdom of Prussia, German Empire
- Died: 5 April 1962 (aged 56) East Berlin, East Germany
- Party: Communist Party of Germany (1929–1946); Socialist Unity Party (1946–1962); Democratic Women's League (1947–1962)
- Spouse: Fritz Selbmann
- Children: Erich Selbmann

Käte Selbmann (née Müller; 17 February 1906 – 5 April 1962) was a German politician who played a key role in the early development of the women's policy of East Germany. A member of the central committees of the Socialist Unity Party and the Democratic Women's League, she also served as a member of the Volkskammer from 1950 until 1954.

== Biography ==
Käte Selbmann (née Müller) was born in Berlin on 17 February 1906. Her father was a railway inspector. Selbmann attended the state-run women's schools in Droyßig and Halle, where she trained as a teacher. She later worked as a clerk and secretary. Selbmann joined the Young Communist League of Germany in 1923 and the Communist Party of Germany (KPD) in 1929. Selbmann was the head of the municipal children's home in Leipzig from 1929 until 1931, when she was dismissed for taking part in a protest. Following the Nazi seizure of power, Selbmann was arrested and held in protective custody from March to April 1933. After her release, she worked at a cardboard factory in Gotha. Selbmann was arrested again in 1935 and sentenced to fourteen months in prison for conspiracy to commit high treason by the Higher Regional Court of Dresden. She was released in 1937. From 1942 until 1945, she worked as a private teacher.

In 1945, following the end of World War II, Selbmann became part of the sub-district leadership of the KPD in Gotha. The following year, she joined the newly-formed Socialist Unity Party (SED) and became the secretary of the Leipzig branch of People's Solidarity. She was also the secretary of the SED branches in West Saxony and Leipzig. Selbmann joined the Democratic Women's League of Germany (DFD) in 1947, becoming the chairwoman of the Saxony branch and a member of the federal executive board in 1948. Later that year, she became a personal assistant to Walter Ulbricht, the future leader of East Germany.

As an SED member of the DFD's executive board, Selbmann declared in July 1948 that the DFD would promote women's roles in factories. At factories that already had high numbers of female workers, such as the Olympia-Werke factory, the DFD engaged in tasks typically reserved for trade unions, such as promoting legislation and social improvements. This eroded into the base of the Free German Trade Union Federation (FDGB) and caused tensions between the two organizations; the SED supported the DFD as a way to assert its hegemony over both organizations by keeping them at odds with each other. Selbmann later expressed frustration at the DFD's position in society, arguing it was "a pre-school for women, neither as central as the FDGB nor even more important than any other mass organization to women's work, and absolutely subordinate to the SED".

Selbmann was named the head of the women's department of the SED central committee in 1949, succeeding Maria Weiterer. She was selected for this position in part because of her husband, the prominent politician Fritz Selbmann, and in part because the SED considered her "more pliable" than her predecessors. As the head of the department, she developed the SED's women's policy and exerted control over the activities of the DFD. Historian Valerie Dubslaff writes that "the role of the department was therefore neither to represent the interests of women nor to promote them within the party, but to execute the political will of its leaders". In 1950, Selbmann was elected as a candidate member of the SED central committee, replacing Robert Rompe.

In the 1950 East German general election, Selbmann was elected to the Volkskammer as a member of the DFD, representing Teltow and Potsdam. She resigned as head of the women's department in November 1952 due to serious illness, and did not seek re-election to the SED central committee or the Volkskammer in 1954. Selbmann became the head of the German Women's Council in 1957. She died in East Berlin on 5 April 1962.
