= Raymond Bonner =

American journalist

- Born: Jefferson City, Missouri, United States
- Occupations: journalist, author, bookstore owner
- Agent: Gloria Loomis
- Notable work: Weakness and Deceit Waltzing with a Dictator; At the Hand of Man Anatomy of Injustice
- Awards: Pulitzer Prize, 1999; Emmy, 2022, Investigative Documentary, "The Forever Prisoner"
- Website: raymondbonner.net

Raymond Bonner is an American lawyer, journalist, author and bookstore owner. He has been a staff writer at The New York Times, The New Yorker and has contributed to The New York Review of Books. He received an Emmy for a documentary he produced with Alex Gibney about the CIA's torture program for 9/11 suspects. He is an owner of a bookstore, Bookoccino, in Sydney, Australia.

== Early life ==
Bonner grew up in St. Louis Park, Minnesota, graduating from St. Louis Park High School in 1960. He earned a J.D. degree from Stanford University Law School in 1967. In 1968 he joined the U.S. Marine Corps, was a Judge Advocate, including a tour in Vietnam. Before taking up journalism, Bonner worked as a staff attorney with Ralph Nader's Public Citizen Litigation Group; was the founder and director of the West Coast advocacy office of Consumers Union; and director of the consumer fraud/white collar crime unit of the San Francisco District Attorney's office.

== Legal career ==
Prior to his career in journalism, Bonner worked as an attorney with the Public Citizen Litigation Group, the Consumers Union (establishing its West Coast Advocacy office), and as head of the white collar crime division of the San Francisco District Attorney's Office.

He taught at the University of California, Davis School of Law. He was a founder, along with Trin Ostrander, of the Public Interest Clearing House at Hastings College of Law, which is today One Justice, the state-wide organization providing legal services to the rural poor.

== Journalism career ==
=== Reporting on El Salvador ===
Bonner is best known as one of two journalists (the other being Alma Guillermoprieto of The Washington Post) who broke the story of the El Mozote massacre, in which some 900 villagers, mostly women, children and elderly, at El Mozote, El Salvador, were slaughtered by the Atlácatl Battalion, a unit of the Salvadoran army in December 1981. A New York Times staff reporter at the time, Bonner was smuggled by Farabundo Martí National Liberation Front (FMLN) rebels to visit the site approximately a month after the massacre took place.

When the Post and Times simultaneously broke the story on January 27, 1982, the US government and its allies at the editorial page of the Wall Street Journal dismissed its central claims as exaggerations. This whitewashing effort was initiated because Bonner's report seriously undermined efforts by the Reagan administration to bolster the human rights image of the right-wing Salvadoran regime, which the US government was supporting with large amounts of military aid in an effort to destroy the FMLN. The Atlacatl Battalion that perpetrated the massacre was an elite Salvadoran army unit that had been trained in the US at US military bases, and armed and directed by US military advisors operating in El Salvador. This was part of a larger US effort to conceal from the public the human rights abuses of the Salvadoran regime and its role in supporting it. As a result of the controversy, escalated by the Wall Street Journal, the New York Times removed Bonner from covering El Salvador and assigned him to the financial desk, and he eventually resigned. Also as a result of the controversy, according to journalists like Anthony Lewis and Michael Massing writing in the Columbia Journalism Review, "other newspapers worried about looking soft on Communism and toned down their reporting from El Salvador." A forensic investigation of the massacre site years later confirmed the accuracy of his reporting. Bonner revisited El Mozote in 20, the subject of a documentary with RetroReport and Frontline.

=== Later work as journalist ===
Starting years later, Bonner has written on contract for the New York Times, covering the Rwanda genocide, the Bosnian War, and the two terrorist bombings in Bali, Indonesia. He was also a staff writer at The New Yorker from 1988 to 1992, writing from Peru, Sudan, Indonesia, Kuwait, and Kurdistan. From 1988 to 2007, Bonner lived in Nairobi and then Warsaw, Vienna, and Jakarta.

Since 2007, he has written book reviews, principally about international security, for The New York Times, The Economist, The Australian, The National Interest and The Guardian. He has also been a regular contributor to ProPublica and the atlantic.com

In 2018, Bonner purchased Bookoccino, a bookstore in Avalon Beach, Australia, which was on the verge of closing. He was joined in the venture by Sally Tabner, a local bibliophile and previous store employee. Under their ownership, Bookoccino has become a favourite coffee shop for the community, and drawing international lovers of books and ideas. Its events have become legendary, attracting some of the biggest names in literature, politics, and journalism, along with local and international writers, journalists, actors, artists and intellectuals including Geoffrey Robertson, Richard Flanagan, Geraldine Brooks, Lionel Shriver, Julia Baird, Richard Fidler; Ben Quilty, Leigh Sales, Mike Cannon-Brookes, Jill Abramson, David Sange, Kathy Lette, Kate Legge, Samantha Power, Richard McGregor, Hugh White, Bryan Brown and many others.

=== Illegal surveillance by FBI ===
In 2008 the Washington Post reported that Bonner had been one of the four journalists whose telephone call records had been illegally obtained by the FBI between 2002 and 2006. During that time Bonner had been based in Jakarta, Indonesia, filing reports on detainee abuse and illegal surveillance.

== Pro bono work ==
Bonner is the co-founder of OneJustice (formerly Public Interest Clearinghouse), an organization that expands the availability of legal services for Californians in need through innovative partnerships with nonprofits, law schools, and the private sector.

== Awards ==
The National Academy of Television Arts and Sciences, 2022, Outstanding Investigative Documentary, "the Forever Prisoner."

- Robert F. Kennedy Book Award (1985)

for Weakness and Deceit: U.S. Policy and El Salvador.

- Overseas Press Club Award (1994)

for coverage of Rwanda.

- Louis M. Lyons Award for Conscience and Integrity in Journalism (1996)

Awarded by the Nieman Foundation for Journalism at Harvard University for "passionate, principled journalism ... in Central America, the Philippines, Central Europe and Africa."

- Pulitzer Prize (1999)

Team award while with The New York Times.

- Cornelius Ryan Award (1988)

Awarded by the Overseas Press Club for his book, Waltzing with a Dictator: The Marcoses and the Making of American Policy.

- The Hillman Prize (1987)

Awarded by The Sidney Hillman Foundation for his book, Waltzing with a Dictator: The Marcoses and the Making of American Policy.

- RTDNA Edward R. Murrow Award (2015)

for "A Search for Justice."

Nominations

- Pulitzer Prize (2001)

Nominated by The New York Times for coverage of the death penalty with Sara Rimer.

== Books ==
- Weakness and Deceit: U.S. Policy and El Salvador. New York: Times Books, 1984. ISBN 978-0812911084.
- Waltzing with a Dictator: The Marcoses and the Making of American Policy. New York: Times Books, 1987. ISBN 978-0333457641.
- At the Hand of Man: Peril and Hope for Africa's Wildlife. New York: Knopf, 1993. ISBN 978-0679400080.
- Anatomy of Injustice: A Murder Case Gone Wrong. New York: Knopf, 2012. ISBN 978-0307700216.
