= Cornelius Ryan Award =

American prize in nonfiction writing

The Cornelius Ryan Award
- Awarded for: Best nonfiction book on international affairs
- Country: United States
- Presented by: Overseas Press Club of America
- First award: 1957
- Website: opcofamerica.org

The Cornelius Ryan Award is given for "best nonfiction book on international affairs" by the Overseas Press Club of America (OPC). To be eligible for this literary award a book must be published "in the US or by a US based company or distributed for an American audience" during the year prior to that in which the award is given. The winner is chosen in a competition juried by peers from the journalism industry.

Recipients of the award receive a certificate and $1000. The Cornelius Ryan Award is one of 25 different awards currently given by the OPC for excellence in journalism at their annual award dinner, usually held at the end of April. The award is named for the journalist and author Cornelius Ryan, who himself, twice received this, his own namesake award (1959 for The Longest Day and 1974 for A Bridge Too Far).

In 2009 the judges were Chris Power (Bloomberg BusinessWeek), Robert Dowling (Caixin Media Group), and Robert Teitelman (The Deal).

Recipients of the Cornelius Ryan Award
Year	Author	Title
1957	David Schoenbrun	As France Goes
1958	John Gunther	Inside Russia Today
1959	Cornelius Ryan	The Longest Day
1960	William L. Shirer	The Rise and Fall of the Third Reich
1961	John Toland	But Not in Shame: The Six Months After Pearl Harbor
1962	Seymour Freidin	The Forgotten People: An Eye Witness Account of the People in the Iron Curtain Countries of Europe from 1945-1961
1963	Dan Kurzman	Subversion of the Innocents: Patterns of Communist Penetration in Africa, the Middle East, and Asia
1964	Robert Trumbull	The Scrutable East: A Correspondent's Report on Southeast Asia
1965	Robert Shaplen	The Lost Revolution: The U.S. in Vietnam, 1946–1966
1966	Welles Hangen	The Muted Revolution: East Germany's Challenge to Russia and the West
1967	George F. Kennan	Memoirs, 1925–1950
1968	George W. Ball	The Discipline of Power: Essentials of a Modern World Structure
1969	Townsend Hoopes	The Limits of Intervention: An Inside Account of How the Johnson Policy of Escalation in Vietnam was Reversed
1970	John Toland	The Rising Sun: The Decline and Fall of the Japanese Empire, 1936–1945
1971	Anthony Austin	The President's War: The Story of the Tonkin Gulf Resolution and How the Nation was Trapped in Vietnam
1972	David Halberstam	The Best and the Brightest
1973	C.L. Sulzberger	An Age of Mediocrity: Memoirs and Diaries, 1963–1972
1974	Cornelius Ryan	A Bridge Too Far
1975	Phillip Knightley	The First Casualty: The War Correspondent as Hero, Propagandist, and Myth Maker from the Crimea to Vietnam
1976	John Toland	Adolf Hitler
1977	David McCullough	The Path Between the Seas: The Creation of the Panama Canal, 1870–1914
1978	Tad Szulc	The Illusion of Peace: Foreign Policy in the Nixon Years
1979	Peter Wyden	Bay of Pigs: The Untold Story
1980	Dan Kurzman	Miracle of November: Madrid's Epic Stand, 1936
1981	Pierre Salinger	America Held Hostage: The Secret Negotiations
1982	Fox Butterfield	China: Alive in the Bitter Sea
1983	David Shipler	Russia: Broken Idols, Solemn Dreams
1984	Kevin Klose	Russia and the Russians: Inside the Closed Society
1985	Joseph Lelyveld	Move Your Shadow: South Africa, Black and White
1986	Tad Szulc	Fidel: A Critical Portrait
1987	Raymond Bonner	Waltzing with a Dictator: The Marcoses and the Making of American Policy
1988	Whitman Bassow	The Moscow Correspondents: Reporting on Russia from the Revolution to Glasnost
1989	Thomas Friedman	From Beirut to Jerusalem
1990	Tad Szulc	Then and Now: How the World Has Changed Since World War II
1991	Sam Dillon	Comandos: The CIA and Nicaragua's Contra Rebels
1992	Misha Glenny	The Fall of Yugoslavia: The Third Balkan War
1993	Mary Anne Weaver	Pakistan: In the Shadow of Jihad and Afghanistan
1994	Michael Ignatieff	Blood and Belonging: Journeys into the New Nationalism
1995	Roger Warner	Back Fire: The CIA's Secret War in Laos and It's Link to the War in Vietnam
1996	Peter Maas	Love Thy Neighbor: A Story of War
1997	Patrick Smith	Japan: A Reinterpretation
1998	Philip Gourevitch	We Wish to Inform You That Tomorrow We Will Be Killed with Our Families: Stories from Rwanda
1999	Thomas L. Friedman	The Lexus and the Olive Tree: Understanding Globalization
2000	A. J. Langguth	Our Vietnam: The War 1954–1975
2001	Mark Bowden	Killing Pablo: The Hunt for the World's Greatest Outlaw
2002	John Laurence	The Cat from Hué: A Vietnam War Story
2003	Milt Bearden, James Risen	The Main Enemy: The Inside Story of the CIA's Final Showdown with the KGB
2004	Steve Coll	Ghost Wars: The Secret History of the CIA, Afghanistan, and Bin Laden, from the Soviet Invasion to September 10, 2001
2005	George Packer	The Assassins' Gate: America in Iraq
2006	Rajiv Chandrasekaran	Imperial Life in the Emerald City: Inside Iraq's Green Zone
2007	Bob Drogin	Curveball: Spies, Lies, and the Con Man Who Caused a War
2008	Dexter Filkins	The Forever War
2009	David Finkel	The Good Soldiers
2010	Oliver Bullough	Let Our Fame be Great: Journeys among the Defiant People of the Caucasus
2011	Robin Wright	Rock the Casbah: Rage and Rebellion Across the Islamic World
2012	Peter Bergen	Manhunt: The Ten-Year Search for Bin Laden From 9/11 to Abbottabad
2013	Jonathan M. Katz	The Big Truck That Went By: How the World Came to Save Haiti and Left Behind a Disaster
2014	Evan Osnos	Age of Ambition: Chasing Fortune, Truth, and Faith in the New China
2015	Tom Burgis	The Looting Machine: Warlords, Oligarchs, Corporations, Smugglers, and the Theft of Africa's Wealth
2016	Arkady Ostrovsky	The Invention of Russia: From Gorbachev’s Freedom to Putin’s War
2017	Suzy Hansen	Notes on a Foreign Country: An American Abroad in a Post-American World
2018	Rania Abouzeid	No Turning Back: Life, Loss and Hope in Wartime Syria
2019	Katherine Eban	Bottle of Lies: Inside the Generic Drug Boom
2020	Declan Walsh	The Nine Lives of Pakistan: Dispatches from a Precarious State
2021	Joe Parkinson, Drew Hinshaw	Bring Back Our Girls: The Untold Story of the Global Search for Nigeria's Missing Schoolgirls
2022	William Neuman	Things Are Never So Bad That They Can't Get Worse: Inside the Collapse of Venezuela
2023	Paul Caruana Galizia	A Death in Malta: An Assassination and a Family's Quest for Justice
2024	Sune Engel Rasmussen	Twenty Years: Hope, War, and the Betrayal of an Afghan Generation
2025	Barbara Demick	Daughters of the Bamboo Grove: From China to America, a True Story of Abduction, Adoption, and Separated Twins
