= Seymour Freidin =

American journalist

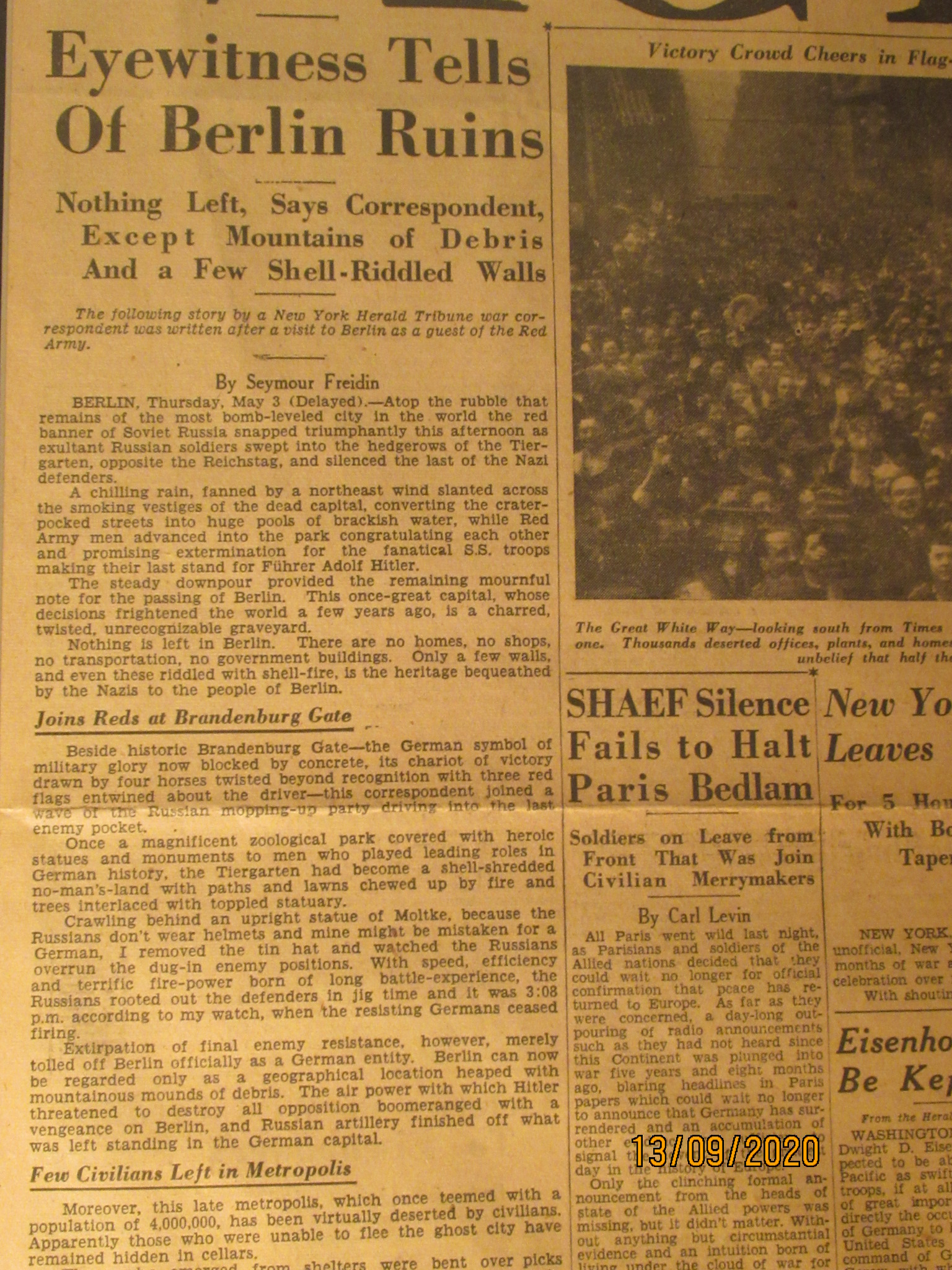
NY Herald Tribune front page on 8 May 1945

Seymour Kenneth Freidin (27 April 1917 – 12 April 1991) was an American journalist and author. He was the first American journalist to reach Berlin in 1945; he subsequently covered post-war events in Eastern Europe, including reporting on the Soviet suppression of the revolution in Hungary from Budapest in 1956.

Freidin was born in New York City. He attended Columbia College, Columbia University, obtaining his degree in 1936, and also studied at the University of Vienna. He then joined the New York Herald Tribune, serving as their war correspondent in Europe during the Second World War. He subsequently worked as a foreign correspondent in Europe and rose to the Herald Tribune's executive foreign editor. In 1972, he became the foreign correspondent in London for the Hearst Corporation, remaining with the company until his retirement in 1989, latterly as the executive assistant to the editor-in-chief. He later said that, whilst living in Europe, he had cooperated with the Central Intelligence Agency. He was also a columnist for the New York Post (1949–61), and wrote for Collier's, Look and other American magazines.

His books include Fatal Decisions (1956), The Forgotten People (1962), The Experts (with George Bailey; 1968) and The Sense of the Senate (1971). The Forgotten People won the Overseas Press Club of America's Cornelius Ryan Award for the best book on foreign affairs in 1962.

In August 1973, Friedin was revealed to be one of the correspondents hired by Nixon political operative Murray Chotiner to spy on the 1972 United States presidential election campaign of Democrat George McGovern under the code name "Chapman's Friend." Friedin served as "Chapman's Friend" until 7 September 1972 when he was replaced in the role by Lucianne Goldberg. Friedin and Goldberg were each paid $1000 a week for their work as undercover operatives.

He married Lillian Stiva Berger in 1950; the couple had two sons, Joshua and Nicholas, two grandsons and two granddaughters. He died aged 73 in a retirement home in Charlottesville, Virginia, in 1991 after a stroke.
