= Waltzing with a Dictator =

1987 American book about US involvement in the presidency of Ferdinand Marcos

Waltzing with a Dictator: The Marcoses and the Making of American Policy
- Author: Raymond Bonner
- Language: English
- Subject: Ferdinand Marcos; United States foreign policy
- Genre: Non-fiction
- Publisher: Times Books
- Publication date: April 12, 1987
- Publication place: United States
- Media type: Print
- Pages: 533
- ISBN: 0812913264

Waltzing with a Dictator: The Marcoses and the Making of American Policy is a 1987 book about the policies of the United States toward the two-decade Philippine presidency of Ferdinand Marcos, written by American investigative reporter Raymond Bonner. The book received mixed reviews from critics, who praised its thoroughly detailed history while criticizing its lack of satisfactory analysis.

== Overview ==
Published a year after the People Power Revolution overthrew Ferdinand Marcos in the Philippines, Waltzing with a Dictator was written by Raymond Bonner to reveal patterns of United States involvement in Marcos' dictatorial presidency, along with providing details of the imprisonment and assassination of Benigno Aquino Jr., a prominent Marcos critic. Bonner sourced his writings from more than 3,000 previously classified documents from the United States government which he was able to retrieve.

== Critical response ==
Marvin Seid of the Los Angeles Times praised the book, writing that Bonner tells the "bizarre and disheartening" story of President Marcos "with rich detail and documentation". Christopher Lehmann-Haupt of The New York Times was critical, however, of the book's focus on historical details to the detriment of satisfactory explanations, stating that "Paradoxically, by so forcefully answering the question 'What happened?' he only increases the mystery of 'Why?'" Donald S. Zagoria of Foreign Affairs also shared this sentiment, expressing that "At an analytical level..., the book is disappointing. There is no serious discussion of U.S. strategic interest in the Philippine bases in the light of Soviet-American rivalry in the Pacific, the Vietnamese invasion of Kampuchea or the Soviet presence in Cam Ranh Bay."

John H. Taylor, then an assistant to former United States President Richard Nixon, denied the book's claim that Nixon had two phone calls and a meeting in 1972 with US Ambassador to the Philippines Henry A. Byroade where he allowed Marcos in advance to acquire absolute power, arguing that they have not been found in any government record. Bonner countered that the White House phone logs had yet to be completed, while Byroade himself informed him about the meeting.
