= Fritz Selbmann =

German politician (1899–1975)

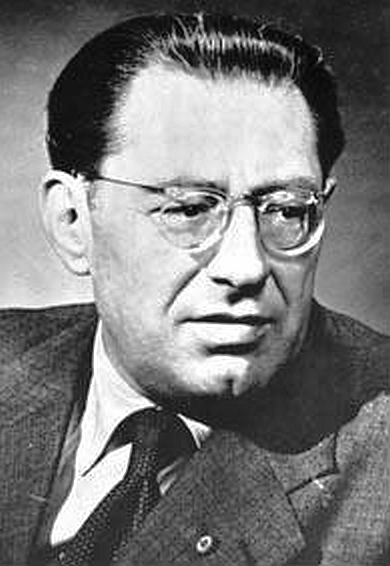
- Selbmann c. 1954

Deputy Minister-President of the Council of Ministers
- In office 24 November 1955 – 13 February 1958
- Minister-President: Otto Grotewohl
- Preceded by: Multi-member position
- Succeeded by: Multi-member position

Minister of Heavy Industry
- In office 16 November 1950 – 24 November 1955
- Minister-President: Otto Grotewohl
- Preceded by: Himself (as Minister of Industry)
- Succeeded by: Rudolf Steinwand

Minister of Industry
- In office 7 October 1949 – 7 November 1950
- Minister-President: Otto Grotewohl
- Preceded by: Position established
- Succeeded by: Himself (as Minister of Heavy Industry)

Deputy Chairman of the German Economic Commission
- In office 9 March 1948 – 7 October 1949
- Chairman: Heinrich Rau
- Preceded by: Position established
- Succeeded by: Position abolished
Parliamentary constituencies
Member of the Volkskammer for Berlin
In office 29 May 1949 – 20 October 1963
Preceded by	Multi-member district
Succeeded by	Multi-member district
Member of the Landtag of Saxony
In office 22 November 1946 – 30 June 1950
Preceded by	Constituency established
Succeeded by	Kurt Drechsler
Member of the Reichstag for Leipzig
In office 31 July 1932 – 28 February 1933
Preceded by	Multi-member district
Succeeded by	Constituency abolished
Member of the Landtag of Prussia for Leipzig
In office 24 April 1932 – 22 August 1932
Preceded by	Multi-member district
Succeeded by	Hans Degel

Personal details
- Born: Friedrich Wilhelm Selbmann; 29 September 1899 Lauterbach, Grand Duchy of Hesse, German Empire
- Died: 26 January 1975 (aged 75) East Berlin, East Germany
- Party: USPD (1920–1922); KPD (1922–1946); SED (after 1946)
- Spouse: Käte Müller
- Children: Erich
- Education: International Lenin School
- Occupation: Politician; Writer
- Awards: National Prize of the German Democratic Republic; Order of Karl Marx (1969); Patriotic Order of Merit, gold clasp (1965); Patriotic Order of Merit, in gold (1964); Banner of Labor (1960); Patriotic Order of Merit, in silver (1955)

Military service
- Allegiance: German Empire
- Years of service: 1917–1918
- Battles/wars: World War I; Western Front
- Central institution membership: 1954–1958: Full member, Central Committee; Other offices held: 1931–1933: Political Leader, Saxony KPD; 1930–1931: Political Leader, Upper Silesia KPD; 1929–1930: Member, Landtag of the Rhine Province; 1924: Organizational Leader, Bottrop KPD

Friedrich Wilhelm "Fritz" Selbmann (29 September 1899 – 26 January 1975) was a German communist politician and writer who served in several legislative positions in the Weimar Republic and East Germany between 1932 and 1963. In the latter state, he also served as Minister of Industry and Heavy Industry from 1949 to 1955, and as Deputy Minister-President of the Council of Ministers from 1955 to 1958.

A manual laborer and veteran of World War I, Selbmann became a regional leader of the Communist Party during the Weimar era. He spent the twelve years of Nazi rule in prison and, after 1940, in a series of concentration camps, though he survived. After the war's end he became a senior party official and author in the German Democratic Republic.

== Biography ==
=== Provenance and early years ===
Selbmann was born at Lauterbach a small town in the hills to the northeast of Frankfurt. His father worked as a coppersmith. He attended school locally and then in 1915 relocated to work as a miner near Bochum. He also undertook factory work during this period and, in 1916, became a member of the Woodworkers' Union. In 1917 he became a soldier in the First World War, serving in France and Belgium. The next year military defeat quickly degenerated into a series of revolutionary uprisings in German ports and cities, which also spread to army units. In 1918 Selbmann was a member of the soldiers' council for his battery. He then joined the workers' and soldiers' council in Naumburg and was a member until early in 1920 when it was broken up by "Grenzschutz West", one of a number of paramilitary "Black Reichswehr" units made up of former soldiers of the German Empire.

=== Politics ===
In 1920 he joined the Independent Social Democratic Party of Germany: he then joined the Communist Party of Germany in 1922. Between 1920 and 1924 he undertook a succession of jobs in various places, at one stage working as a miner at Hindenburg in Oberschlesien (as Zabrze had been renamed in 1915). In 1922/23 he was actively involved in opposition to French occupation of the Ruhr region. In 1923 the French authorities took him into "protective custody".

In 1924 Selbmann became organisation leader for the local Communist Party branch in Bottrop. Between 1925 and 1928 he was a local party leader ("Gauführer") in the "Alliance of Red Front-Fighters" ("Roter Frontkämpferbund" / RFB) in the Ruhr region and a member of the German national leadership with the RFB and of the regional party leadership team ("Bezirksleitung") for the Ruhr. He was back in Moscow during 1928/29 when he attended a course of study at the Communist International's "Lenin Academy" (where he was identified by a party pseudonym as "Skowronek"). He returned as the party's Trades Union Secretary within the Team Leadership ("Bezirklsleitung") for the economically crucial Ruhr region. During 1929/30 he also worked as editor in chief of the "Ruhrecho", a newspaper based in Essen.

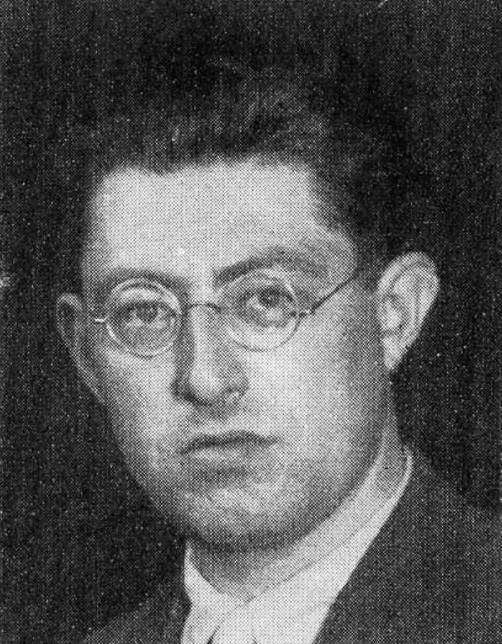
Selbmann's official Landtag portrait, 1932

Within Germany by far the largest state was Prussia, which unlike the other German states still had a large number of provincial parliaments. Provincial parliamentary elections were held on 17 November 1929 and in the heavily industrialised Prussian Rhine Province the Communists won a 12.7% vote share, entitling them to 21 seats in the 163 seat parliament. One of the Communist Party seats went to Fritz Selbmann. Between 1930 and 1932 he served as a member of the Prussian parliament ("Landtag") itself, taking over a seat vacated through the death in October 1930 of a party comrade.

=== Crisis years ===
He combined his membership of the Prussian parliament with other party functions, serving as "Polleiter" (literally, "policy leader") with the regional party leadership team ("Bezirksleitung") in Upper Silesia from May 1930. That role ended early in 1931 when he took on the same function with the "Bezirksleitung" for Saxony which was the party's second largest regional branch, exceeded in importance only by the Greater Berlin region. Meanwhile, national politics were becoming ever more polarised and the national parliament (Reichstag) becoming ever more deadlocked, 1932 was a year of two general elections. The first of these took place in July 1932, and the Communist Party share of the vote increased to more than 14%, equating to 89 seats in a 608-seat parliament. One of those seats went to Fritz Selbmann. He was elected not simply as a "list candidate", but as a representative of electoral district 29 (Leipzig).

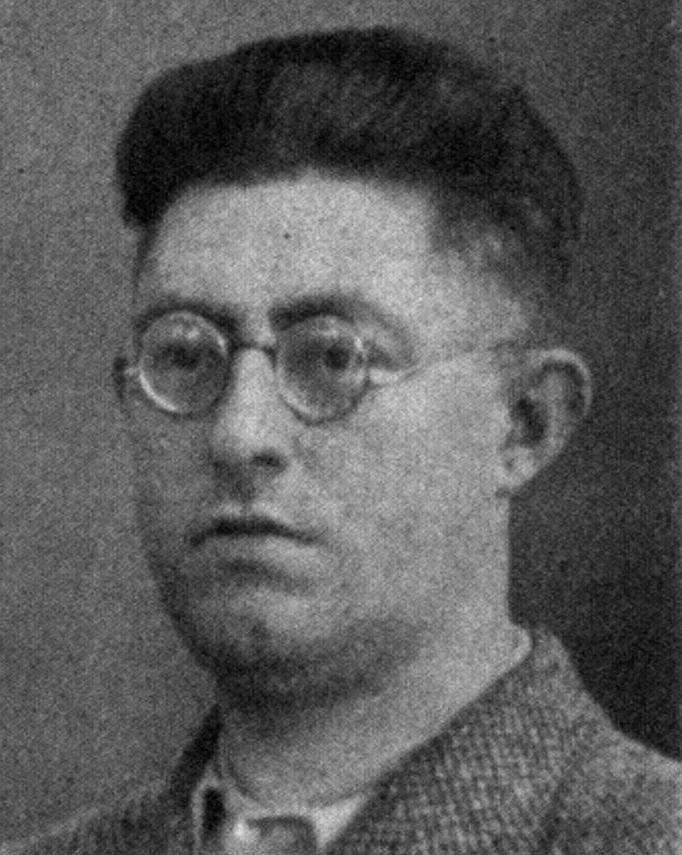
Selbmann's official Reichstag portrait, 1932

During this period the focus of Selbmann's political energies was on "united action by the working class and the triggering of mass struggle against the dangers of fascism" ("für die Aktionseinheit der Arbeiterklasse und die Entfaltung des Massenkampfes gegen die faschistische Gefahr"). The Communist Party vote share increased further in the November 1932 election and Selbmann retained his Leipzig seat. By contrast, the National Socialist share of the national vote fell back in that election, even though they remained the largest single party in what was by now an extremely fragmented Reichstag. With the parliamentary process still completely deadlocked and increasingly discredited the National Socialists took power in January 1933 and lost no time in transforming Germany into a one-party dictatorship. That made political activity (except in support of Nazi policy) illegal, and the authorities quickly became particularly zealous in attending to those with a political past or present that involved the Communist Party. On 7 February 1933 Selbmann was one of the participants at the "illegal" Sporthaus Ziegenhals meeting, celebrated subsequently (especially during the "East German" years) as the last meeting held by the German Communist Party leadership before the participants were arrested and killed, or in some cases managed to escape abroad.

The focus of Selbmann's (by definition illegal) political work switched to Leipzig which is where, on 11 April 1933, he was arrested. It was around this time that his wife died. Their six-year-old son Erich, who later became a successful author, would grow up with family friends. Selbmann, meanwhile, was held in investigatory custody in Leipzig and Berlin for approximately two and a half years, and then tried at the special People's Court early in November 1935, facing the usual charge under such circumstances of "preparing to commit high treason" (... wegen "Vorbereitung zum Hochverrat"). He was sentenced to a seven-year jail term. He was held till May 1940 at the Waldheim penitentiary where some or all of his sentence was served in solitary confinement.

The sentence having taken account of the time spent in pretrial detention, he was scheduled for release in 1940, but instead he was taken into "protective custody", and spent the next two years as an inmate at the Sachsenhausen concentration camp. At Sachsenhausen there was already a core of communist activists among the inmates who were able (discretely) to welcome another political soulmate. Across Germany, as war deaths took their toll of manpower, administration of daily life in concentration camps was increasingly delegated by the camp guards to trusted inmates; the decisions of "friends" meant that Selbmann was set to work in the vehicle repair shop of the camp brick making operation where, as he later recalled, the work was "not hard or especially dangerous". In November 1942, however, he was moved to the Flossenbürg concentration camp, which supplied labour to local quarries, set in mountains adjacent to the border with what was at that time known as the Sudetenland. According to Selbmann's own recollection the transfer to Flossenbürg involved eighteen prisoners who had been placed in solitary confinement the previous month as a response to their political activities. The move was implemented on the orders of Reichsführer Heinrich Himmler himself: it represented a punishment "for building [Communist] cells in the camp [at Sachsenhausen], organizing revolutionary work, and privileging political prisoners". During what turned out to be the final weeks of the war the Flossenbürg camp was closed down and Selbmann was transferred again, this time to Dachau in the suburbs north of Munich. At the end of April 1945, as the authorities raced to clear the concentration camps of their inmates ahead of the arrival of the invading armies, he was sent out on one of the infamous death marches. He managed to escape and made his way back to Leipzig.

=== Soviet occupation zone ===
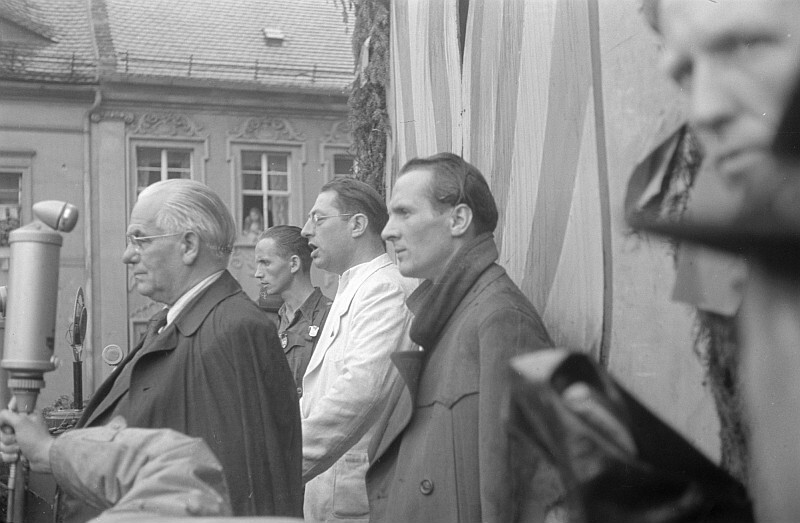
Selbmann (center, in white suit) gives a speech at a meeting of the Free German Youth in Bautzen, August 1946

Leipzig had been liberated from Nazi control by United States forces in April 1945, but by that time a different postwar division of Germany had been agreed between the victorious leaders. In July 1945 the Americans pulled back to be replaced by Soviet forces. The central third of what had been Germany was now administered as the Soviet occupation zone, to be relaunched, in October 1949, as the Soviet sponsored German Democratic Republic (East Germany). In Leipzig, Fritz Selbmann immediately took on the leadership of the "Provisional Central Committee of the Antifascist Bloc" ("Provisorischen Zentralausschusses des Antifaschistischen Blocks"). It is not entirely clear what this involved, but it was in any case only one of several leadership roles within the political structure that came his way, as he joined with like-minded comrades, in the upbeat language of those times, to overcome the destruction of war, develop a national economy and build a socialist future ("... beim Aufbau des Sozialismus bedeutende Verdienste erwarben"). Another office to which the military authorities appointed him in 1945 was as First Secretary of the Communist Party District Leadership ("Kreisleitung") for Leipzig. In August 1945 he was appointed president of the Regional Labour Office ("... des Landesarbeitsamtes") and in September 1945 he was made Regional Vice-president for State Administration in Saxony. In October 1946, as seemingly more long-term political institutions emerged, he was elected a member of the regional parliament (Sächsischer Landtag), resigning (as his national political responsibilities increased) only on 30 June 1950. Additionally, in December 1946 he was appointed Economics and Planning Minister in the State of Saxony, a position he retained till 1948. This was part of a tier of government that would formally cease to exist by the end of 1952, as an aggressive centralisation of political power took hold.

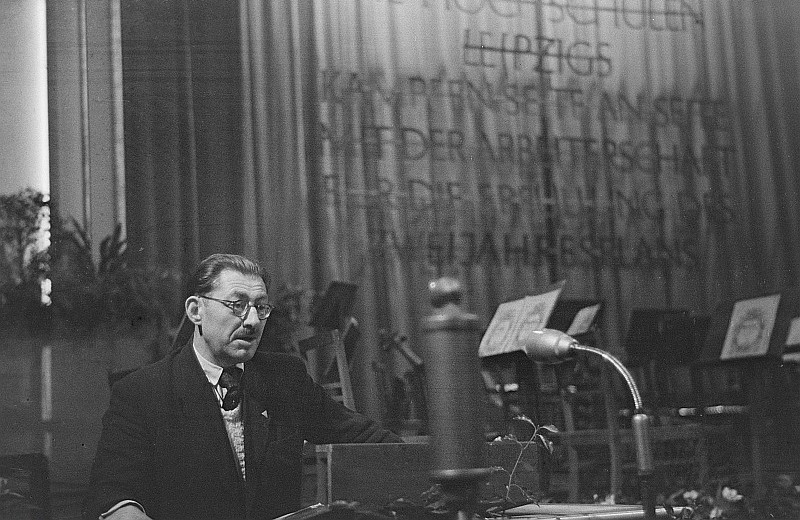
Selbmann gives a speech in Leipzig, 1948

In April 1946 the new Socialist Unity Party ("Sozialistische Einheitspartei Deutschlands" / SED) was successfully launched (if only in Germany's Soviet zone) by means of a contentious political merger which was intended to ensure that political divisions on the left would never again leave the way open for the election to power of a populist right wing political party. During 1946 Fritz Selbmann was one of thousands of Communist Party members who lost no time in signing their party memberships across to the new party. In 1948, after stepping down from his regional ministerial position in Saxony, Selbmann moved to (East) Berlin. He was appointed deputy chairman of the German Economic Commission, a "the top administrative body" in the Soviet occupation zone, and also enjoyed responsibility during 1948/49 for the "National Industrial Department" ("Hauptverwaltung Industrie"). The establishment of the German Democratic Republic (East Germany) in October 1949 saw the administrative structures in the Soviet occupation zone replaced. Ministers replaced administrators and Vasily Chuikov, until 1949 head of the Soviet Military Administration in Germany, became instead head of the People's Control Commission. Selbmann was one of several senior administrators who became a government minister.

=== German Democratic Republic (East Germany) ===
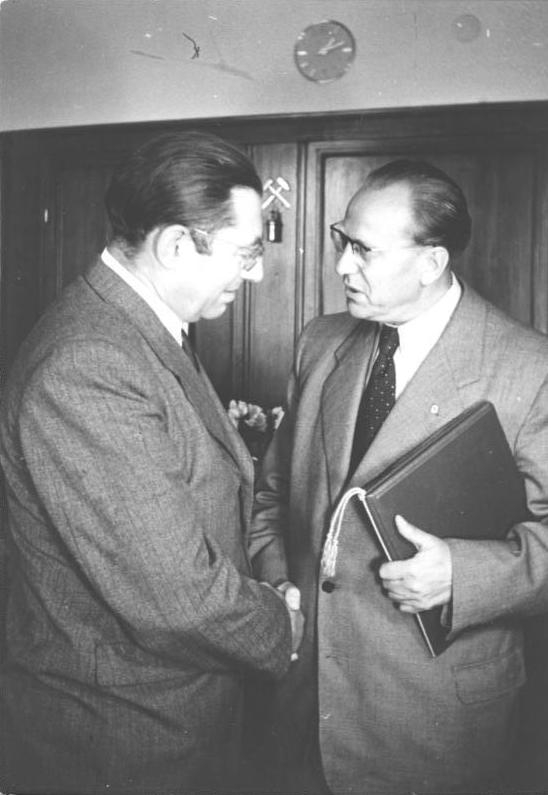
Selbmann (left) is greeted on his 50th birthday by Socialist Unity Party co-chairman Otto Grotewohl, 29 September 1949

In the new government Selbmann was appointed Minister for Industry in 1949, and then, as the department was very soon subdivided, Minister for Heavy Industry in 1950. Between 1951 and 1953 he served as Minister for Ores Mining and Metallurgy.

In 1949 he was also selected for membership of the People's Council ("Volksrat"), a body mandated to draw up a constitution based on a draft document helpfully provided by the SED. Later that year the People's Council became the People's Parliament ("Volkskammer"). Selbmann served as an SED member of this legislative body between 1949 and 1963, representing East Berlin.

In 1953 Fritz Selbemann headed up the German side in the commission that oversaw the transfer of the final tranche of Sowjetische Aktiengesellschaft businesses to the East German government. This involved around 200 businesses employing approximately 300,000 that the Soviets had requisitioned directly after the war as part of a programme to enforce war reparations, and the 1953 negotiation, concluded shortly after the death of Stalin could be seen as an important step forwards.

=== 1953 ===
1953 was also the year of the East German uprising, and on the afternoon of 16 June 1953 Fritz Selbmann, considered to be more "approachable" than some of his stony-faced leadership comrades, stood in front of the vast Ministries Building in the Leipziger Straße to undertake discussions with protesters. He displayed considerable courage, walking into the crowd of more than 10,000 angry strikers, and then clambering onto an office desk from which he attempted to address the crowd. However, the protestors were already too worked up for this approach to succeed: even his announcement that the government had withdrawn the previous month's 10% increase in "standard production quantities", one of the issues that had triggered the protests - failed to quell the mood. Selbmann invited his listeners to look at his rough hands, which showed that he was a worker himself ("Seht euch meine Hände an", ruft er der Menge zu, "ich bin selber Arbeiter."), but he drew only whistles from those nearest to him. The government needed scapegoats and he had to resign his ministerial post two months later (ostensibly following a serious social indiscretion involving alcohol). The increasingly violent protests that broke out the next day on the streets of East Berlin, and in other industrial centers, threatened to get out of control. A month later, thanks to the fraternal intervention of Soviet tanks and troops, control had been restored.

=== Central Committee ===
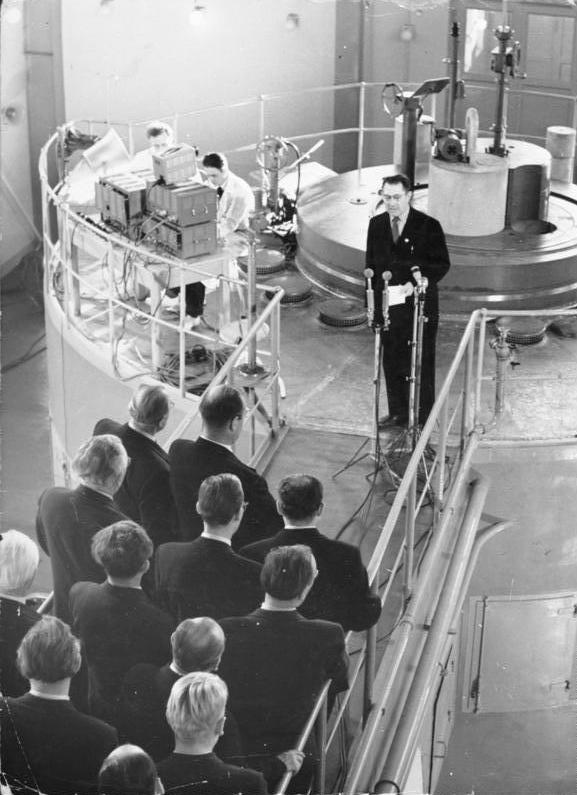
Selbmann delivers an address at the ceremony for the launch of the Rossendorf Research Reactor, East Germany's first nuclear reactor, 16 December 1957

Fritz Selbmann's position in the party was steadily rising. In the country's Marxist–Leninist constitutional structure, which had been imported from the Soviet Union after 1945, Power was concentrated on the Central Committee of the ruling party which Fritz Selbmann joined in 1954. He also served, between 1955 and 1958, as a deputy chairman of the Council of Ministers and, within the presidium of the Ministerial Council, as Chairman of the Commission for Industry and Transport. During 1957/58 he additionally was appointed Chairman of the "Commission for Technical Progress" within the Central Committee's technical section.

=== Beyond peak career ===
Selbmann lost his Central Committee membership and the other offices in 1958, however he continued to be listed as a candidate for Central Committee membership At the party conference in February 1958, he was accused by Walter Ulbricht and Erich Honecker of "managerialism" ("Managertums") and a "deviant attitude" ("abweichender Haltung"). The attack came in the context of a wider rift in the party which broke open at that time. Selbmann was accused of having supported the so-called Schirdewan-Wollweber-Ziller faction, at the party conference, at which it became clear that the East German leader Walter Ulbricht had changed his mind about implementing a marginal introduction of certain elements of a free market economy into the East German system. He also received a "strong reprimand" from the Central Committee. This time the fall from grace was permanent and on 9 March 1959 Fritz Selbmann felt it necessary to publish a "self-criticism".

Between 1958 and 1961 Selbmann was employed as a deputy chairman in the National Planning Commission, a large and amorphous government agency. The nature of his duties is unclear but those sources that mention this part of his career indicate that the job was an inconsequential one. He was also made head of the Department for Recording and Allocating the Means of Production. He served between 1961 and 1964 as one of the deputy chairmen of the People's Economic Council ("Volkswirtschaftsrat" / VWR), which was dissolved and replaced as part of a reorganisation that took place in 1965.

=== After politics ===
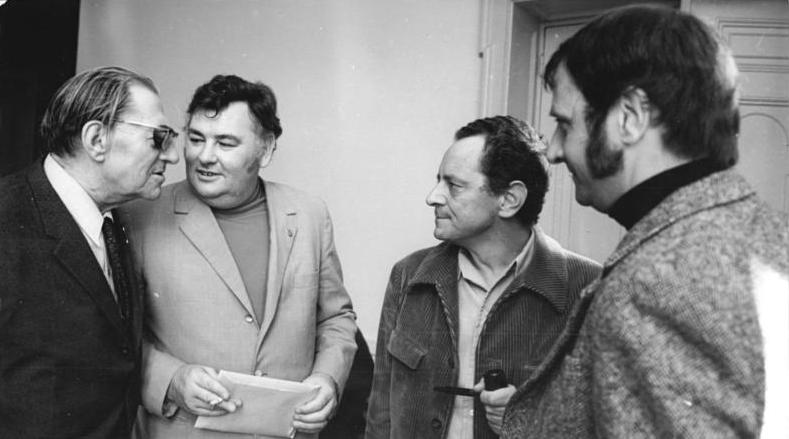
Selbmann (far left) alongside Erik Neutsch, Dieter Noll and Benito Wogatzki at a board meeting of the German Writers' Union, 24 October 1973

"Die Lange Nacht" ("The long night"), generally regarded as Selbmann's first novel, was published in 1961. After 1964 he is recorded as a freelance author/novelist, based in East Berlin. He also served between 1969 and 1975 as a vice-president of the (East) German Writers' Association. Along with a number of novels, which enjoyed modest success on the domestic market in their day, there was an autobiography, "Acht Jahre und ein Tag. Bilder aus den Gründerjahren der DDR" ("Eight years and one day. Images from the foundation years of the German Democratic Republic"). This included some trenchant, hitherto little publicized, insights into the events of June 1953. That may be why this book remained unpublished in Selbmann's lifetime, only appearing in 1999, nearly ten years after the social, economic and then political changes that led to the end of the German Democratic Republic.

== Celebration ==
Selbmann worked as a freelance writer in East Berlin until his death in 1975. He lived and worked, during his final years, in the Berlin quarter of Müggelheim, and after he died, in 1977 the Junior School there was renamed in his honour. (It was renamed again after reunification.) Other educational institutions and public structures were named in his honour including the vast Black Pump "Fritz Selbmann" Gas Complex.

State honours received during his lifetime included the Patriotic Order of Merit in silver (1955), in gold (1964) and the Patriotic Order of Merit (gold clasp) (1965). He was also a recipient, in 1960, of the Banner of Labor and in 1969 of the Order of Karl Marx and, in recognition of his contribution to literature, of the National Prize of the German Democratic Republic, Class II.

== Publications (selection) ==
- 1961: Die lange Nacht
- 1962: Die Heimkehr des Joachim Ott, Novel, Mitteldeutscher Verlag, Halle/Saale
- 1965: Die Söhne der Wölfe
- 1969: Alternative, Bilanz, Credo, Autobiography
- 1973: Der Mitläufer
- 1999 (posthumously): Acht Jahre und ein Tag. Bilder aus den Gründerjahren der DDR, Autobiography 1945–53
