= Wolfgang Bergold =

East German politician and diplomat (1913–1987)

Ambassador of the German Democratic Republic to North Vietnam
- In office 1963–1968
- Preceded by: Karl Nohr
- Succeeded by: Klaus Willerding

Personal details
- Born: 19 April 1913 Dresden, Saxony, Germany
- Died: 14 August 1987 (aged 74) East Berlin, GDR (East Germany)
- Party: KPD; SED
- Occupation: Politician / Diplomat

Wolfgang Bergold (19 April 1913 – 14 August 1987) was an East German politician and diplomat who in 1963 was appointed as his country's ambassador to (North) Vietnam.

As a young man he was a persistent participant in Communist Resistance against the Nazi regime: between 1933 and 1945 much of his time was spent inside a succession of concentration camps and prisons.

== Life ==
Bergold was born in Saxony. His father was a lithographer and porcelain painter who later worked as a library administrator. Wolfgang Bergold successfully completed his school career in 1932 and then started to study Economics, Russian and Chinese at the Dresden University of Technology. However, he was excluded in 1933.

In 1930 he joined the Young Communists (KJVD), and in the same year was a co-founder of the Socialist School-students League. From 1932 he was also a member of the Free Socialist Student Fraternity. At the start of 1933 the Nazi Party took power and set about making membership all political parties other than their own illegal. Their leader, Adolf Hitler, was a powerful speaker who was particularly vitriolic about the Communist Party, Between 1933 and 1945 Wolfgang Bergold was imprisoned several times. In 1933 he was sentenced to a year's detention, and was interned, from April 1933 till July 1934, in the concentration camp at Hohnstein.

On his release he resumed his illegal activities, Bergold was arrested again in December 1934, and in November 1935 he was sentenced to a year in prison for "Preparation of High treason". In 1935/36 he was interned in Dresden and in the Sachsenburg concentration camp. Between 1937 and 1941 he worked in as a clerk in Dresden. Along with Karl Stein and Herbert Bochow he was among the organisers of the Dresden Resistance Group. In April 1941, still in Dresden, Bergold was arrested again, and in 1942 sentenced to ten years imprisonment by the People's Court. With the exception of three months, from July till August 1943, in the 999th Light Afrika (punishment) division, he spent the rest of the Second World War in the prison at Waldheim.

In May 1945 the war ended and Dresden found itself in that part of what had been Germany that was now designated by the winning side as the Soviet occupation zone (SBZ). Bergold was a member of the now legal Communist Party of Germany (KPD). However, the Soviet Military Administration in Germany had a plan for what now began to mutate into the German Democratic Republic (East Germany). The plan involved a return to a one-party state, and in 1946 the KPD merged with the Social Democratic Party (SPD) in this part of the country: members of both parties were invited, with a simple signature, to switch their party allegiance to the new Socialist Unity Party (SED). In 1946 Wolfgang Bergold joined the SED.

From May till September 1945 he participated in the reconstruction of municipal administration in the Wilschdorf quarter of Dresden. Between September and November he worked as a teacher of German to officers from the Soviet Military Administration in Dresden. In 1945/46 he then worked in the Saxony region administration team, heading up the Statistics and Organisation division in the Department for Refugees. He underwent a training at the regional Party Academy and then in 1947, joined Sachsenwerk Radeberg, an electrical manufacturing business with a complex history which was now focusing on the manufacture of domestic radios and televisions. Bergold joined as a technical buyer, moving on to become secretary to the Commercial Director, and then, from 1948, as Culture Director and Party Secretary, during the period covering the enterprise's nationalisation. He stayed with VEM till 1954. Between 1953 and 1961 he undertook correspondence based study with the party's Karl Marx Academy in Berlin, but in Bergold's case this did not lead to a degree. In 1954/55 he worked as an instructor with the Dresden regional party leadership, and in 1955 joined the party's national Central Committee, becoming deputy section leader with the Department for Foreign Policy and International Relations. Between 1963 and 1968 Wolfgang Bergold served as his country's ambassador to Hanoi.

In 1969 he became Secretary of the Central Leadership of the so-called Committee of Anti-fascist resistance fighters in East Germany, and from 1970 he was secretary of the international umbrella organisation, the International Federation of Resistance Fighters – Association of Anti-Fascists (FIR). In 1982 he became chairman of the Finance Control Commission of the FIR in Vienna.

Wolfgang Bergold died on 14 August 1987.

== Awards and honours ==
- Banner of Labor (1966)
- Patriotic Order of Merit in Silver (1973)
- Patriotic Order of Merit in Gold (1978)
- Patriotic Order of Merit Gold clasp (1983)

== Publications (not necessarily a complete list) ==
- Die Verschärfung der Klassenwidersprüche in Frankreich. In: Einheit (1962), Vol 5, p 87–96.
- Vietnam schreitet von Sieg zu Sieg. In: Deutsche Außenpolitik (1965), Vol 11, p 1314–1321.
