= Manfred Bochmann =

East German politician (1928–2011)

- Born: 15 March 1928; Zschorlau, Saxony, Germany
- Died: 18 November 2011 (aged 83); Germany
- Occupation: Politician
- Political party: SED

Manfred Bochmann (15 March 1928 – 18 November 2011) was an East German politician who served as his country's Minister for Geology for fifteen years.

== Life ==
Bochmann was born into a working-class family in a mining region of Saxony, in a small town some 5 km (3 miles) outside Aue.

In 1945 he was called up for national service and joined the army, before being captured and interned as a prisoner of war by the Americans in May/June of that year. In 1945/46 he trained as a toolmaker. He then undertook further education at the local Technical College, and at the Freiberg University of Mining and Technology.

He obtained a degree in Economics and became a full-time functionary of the country's ruling SED (party) which he had joined in 1946. Between 1962 and 1967 he was Secretary for Economics for the Wismut region leadership. In 1967 he was awarded a doctorate for a dissertation which he had prepared jointly with Günther Lingott entitled "Ways to optimize management of labour collectives through the complex rationalisation of work operations through the development of Best practise and its application as standard practise. Example researched: SDAG Wismut The Wismut mining operation where Bochmann had worked on his doctorate was militarily, and therefore also politically important because it was a major source of uranium. Zschorlau, where Bochmann was born and where Wismut had a facility, has been economically focused on mining for several centuries.

From 1967 till 1974 he was secretary of State for Geology, following which, under a decision of the Ministerial Council dated 13 June 1974, he was appointed East Germany's Minister for Geology, retaining the position till 1989.

== Awards ==
- 1974 Patriotic Order of Merit in Silver
- 1978 Banner of Labor
- 1984 Patriotic Order of Merit in Gold
- 1988 Star of People's Friendship
