= Kolmer =

Kolmer is a German-language surname from a status name originally denoting a yeoman according to Kulm law. It may refer to:

- Eva Schmidt-Kolmer (1913–1991), Austrian-German physician
- Felix Kolmer (1922–2022), Czech physicist, specialising in the field of acoustics
