= Svojšín =

- Municipality
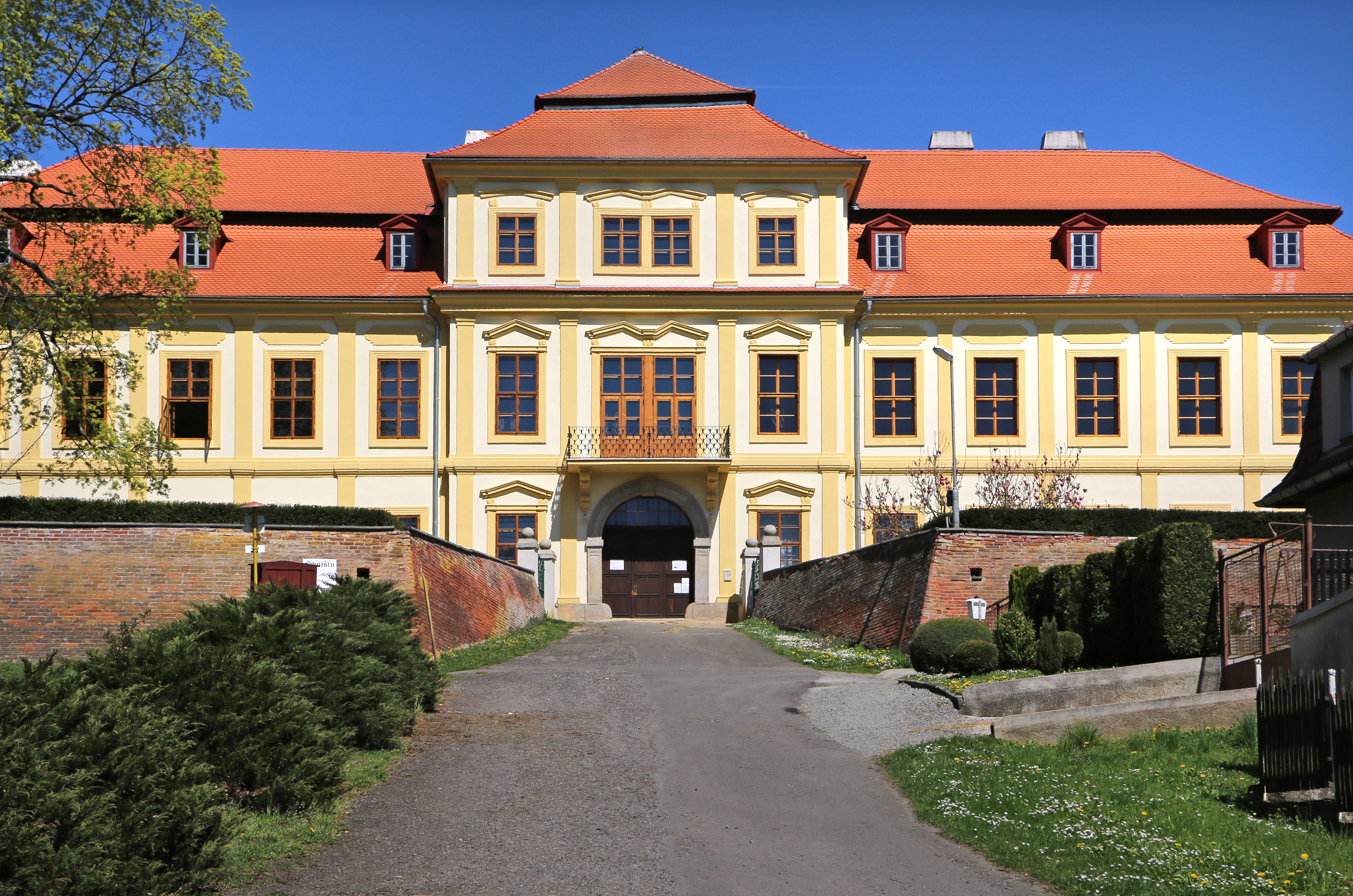
- Svojšín Castle

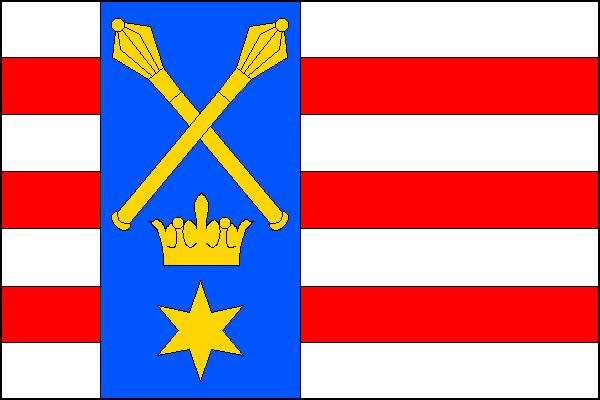
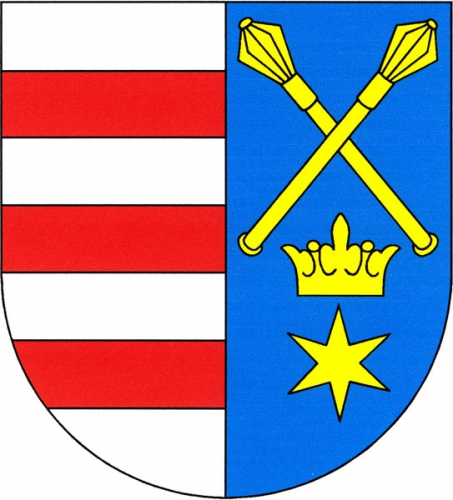
- Flag Coat of arms

- Location in the Czech Republic
- Coordinates: 49°45′58″N 12°54′39″E
- Country: Czech Republic
- Region: Plzeň
- District: Tachov
- First mentioned: 1177

Area
  - Total: 13.54 km^{2} (5.23 sq mi)
- Elevation: 406 m (1,332 ft)

Population (2026-01-01)
  - Total: 479
  - Density: 35.4/km^{2} (91.6/sq mi)
- Time zone: UTC+1 (CET)
  - Summer (DST): UTC+2 (CEST)
- Postal code: 349 01
- Website: www.svojsin.cz

Svojšín (German: Schweißing) is a municipality and village in Tachov District in the Plzeň Region of the Czech Republic. It has about 500 inhabitants.

Svojšín lies approximately 22 kilometres (14 mi) east of Tachov, 34 km (21 mi) west of Plzeň, and 115 km (71 mi) west of Prague.

== Administrative division ==
Svojšín consists of four municipal parts (in brackets population according to the 2021 census):

- Svojšín (378)
- Holyně (4)
- Nynkov (13)
- Řebří (43)

== Demographics ==
Historical population
Year	Pop.	±%
1869	971	—
1880	765	−21.2%
1890	824	+7.7%
1900	819	−0.6%
1910	771	−5.9%
1921	817	+6.0%
1930	977	+19.6%
1950	434	−55.6%
1961	514	+18.4%
1970	466	−9.3%
1980	457	−1.9%
1991	435	−4.8%
2001	441	+1.4%
2011	402	−8.8%
2021	438	+9.0%
Source: Censuses

== Notable people ==
- Josef Wenig (1896–1981), German labour and political activist
