= Gerhard Dengler =

East German writer and journalist (1914–2007)

- Born: 29 May 1914; Reinhausen, Province of Hanover, Germany
- Died: 3 January 2007 (aged 92); Hennigsdorf, Brandenburg, Germany
- Occupations: Journalist writer broadcaster
- Political party: NSDAP; SED

Gerhard Dengler (29 May 1914 in Reinhausen – 3 January 2007 in Hennigsdorf) was an East German writer, print and broadcast journalist, and (briefly) newspaper editor.

== Life ==
=== Early years ===
Gerhard Dengler was born on 24 May 1914 in Reinhausen, Göttingen. His father was the noted Forestry Scientist Alfred Dengler (1874–1944). Dengler grew up in Chorin, Brandenburg and in Eberswalde where his father was a professor and at one stage rector of the Forestry Academy. From 1934 to 1935 and 1937 to 1939, he studied Journalismn in Munich and Berlin, and in 1939, he received a doctorate in philosophy under Professor Emil Domifat. During his studies in Munich, he was a member of the "Corps Franconia," a German fencing fraternity. Between 1935 and 1937 he served his compulsory military service with Artillerieregiment 3 in Frankfurt and left the Army as an Officer Cadet. On 1 May 1937 he was admitted into the NSDAP (Nazi party). He was also a member of the party's quasi-military wing, the Sturmabteilung (SA), having been in the youth branch of a precursor organisation, Der Stahlhelm since 1932.

=== War Years ===
Shortly after receiving his doctorate, he was called up for military service during the general mobilization in August 1939. Serving with Artillery Regiment 3, he participated—initially as a platoon leader—in the Invasion of Poland and subsequently in the Battle of France. During this time, he briefly served as Location commander of Autun. At the beginning of the invasion of the Soviet Union on June 22, 1941, he was a First Lieutenant and commanded the staff battery of Artillery Regiment 3 (motorized). The regiment took part in the assault on Leningrad, reached Moscow in late 1941, and was subsequently transferred to Army Group South on the Don River. During the Battle of Stalingrad, the regiment secured the steep bank of the Volga for the 6th Army. After the Red Army encircled the city in November 1942, Dengler participated in the defense of the pocket, serving as a Captain and commanding officer of 5th Battery. German sources frequently refer to the Battle of Stalingrad as a "kettle" operation, recalling to the way German army were surrounded and "cooked" when the Soviets regrouped and counter-attacked.

=== Prisoner of War and Anti-Fascist Activities ===
On January 28, 1943 — prior to the general capitulation of the 6th Army — Dengler surrendered along with the remnants of his 5th Battery and became a Soviet prisoner of war. While held at the Oranki POW Camp near Gorky, he became a member of the National Committee for a Free Germany (*Nationalkomitee Freies Deutschland*) an alliance of exiled German Communists and soldiers who had become communist prisoners of war. He was sent to the "Antifa School" in Krasnogorsk, where he studied Marxism-Leninism. At the National Committee's headquarters in Lunovo, he was later assigned tasks involving newspaper and radio work. The contributions he signed with his name and rank had serious consequences back in Germany: Dengler was sentenced to death for high treason, and his parents were subjected to *Sippenhaft* (collective punishment of a traitor's family). His renunciation of National Socialism exacted a heavy personal toll; his father took his own life in October 1944. Looking back on this period in 1949—using the rhetoric common to European Marxism at the time—Gerhard Dengler spoke at a regional party conference about how he had "separated himself from his class." Many decades later, in a wide ranging and thought provoking radio interview broadcast with *Deutschlandfunk* in 2001, he reflected on this: ""My bourgeois consciousness died in Stalingrad. Everything that had seemed respectably bourgeois to me up to that point failed the test of life in Stalingrad. And that is why I said: I want nothing more to do with those people." That is why, later on at the Central Antifa School—I would say—I soaked up Marxism like a dry sponge absorbs water. After all, I was empty."

=== Soviet Occupation Zone and German Democratic Republic ===
In 1945, Dengler returned with the "Ulbricht Group". to what was left of Germany in the Soviet occupation zone Under control of the Red Army, that part of Germany was undergoing a fast transformation into another one-party state to be later called the German Democratic Republic (East Germany). In 1946 he joined the newly created Socialist Unity Party (SED / Sozialistische Einheitspartei Deutschlands) and was assigned as a reporter to Sächsische Zeitung (newspaper). in Dresden. He later moved to Leipzig, an hour or so to the west of Dresden, and worked as the Editor in Chief of the Leipziger Volkszeitung from 1946 to 1948. Between November 1948 and May 1949 he was editor in chief of "Der Augenzeuge" ("The eye-witness"), which was a weekly political newsreel presentation produced by the DEFA, the state-owned film company. In 1950, at the instigation of his mentor Herrmann Matern, he was appointed to the editorial team of Neues Deutschland (ND), the mass-circulation national newspaper of the SED (party), working as the newspaper's first ever correspondent in the west German provisional capital, Bonn, between 1953 and 1958. After returning to Berlin, Dengler became chief commentator for the Deutschlandsender, the country's national radio station, taking the position over from Karl-Eduard von Schnitzler.

In 1959 he took on the vice-chairmanship of the National Presidium Council of the East German National Front, a political grouping of minor political parties and mass movements, each having a fixed quota of seats in the National Assembly (Volkskammer), and controlled through the National Front by the country's ruling SED (party). From 1962 till 1967 he headed up the working group in the National Council on Braunbuch, a book that appeared in several editions and enjoyed large print-runs, and which detailed how numerous former Nazis continued to hold positions of power and influence in West Germany and in the West more generally. (West Germany responded with a "Braunbuch" of its own detailing former Nazis who had turned up in positions of power and influence in East Germany.) In 1966 he became Vice-president of the National Front's National Council with responsibility for "West work", a position he held till 1969. In this capacity, he led the compilation of biographies of 1,200 individuals with a fascist past who held positions in the state, administration, business sector, judiciary, academia, and the Bundeswehr of the Federal Republic of Germany. In September 1969 Dengler's career switched again, now to the (East) German "Walter Ulbricht" Academy for Legal and Political Science, where he headed up the "Foreign Information" section first as a lecturer, and in 1978 following his habilitation as a full professor until he reached retirement in September 1979.. In 1969, he moved to the German Academy of State and Legal Science; he had been appointed He headed the Foreign Information Section there until reaching retirement age and attaining emeritus status in 1979. He was awarded the Patriotic Order of Merit in bronze in 1961 and in silver in 1964. In 1989, he received the Star of People's Friendship in silver.

=== Life after 1989 ===
Gerhard Dengler lived long enough to see the changes that led to German reunification in 1990. In extreme old age he gave a number of media interviews reflecting on some of the decisions he had made. He expressed no regrets over his decision to become a Communist.

"Of course we were Stalinists [in 1943]. Stalin, for us, was the hero who had defeated us in front of Moscow and in front of Stalingrad."

Dengler was open about the horror he felt when Khrushchev's secret speech delivered to the 20th Soviet Party Congress on 25 February 1956 became public.

"That was my second Stalingrad ... to learn that Stalin had murdered more Communists than Hitler."

He nevertheless remained confident that he had switched to the right side:

"In a farmhouse we were given tea, a piece of toast and some dried fish. The Russians did not shoot me: they shared their bread with me."

In 1990, Gerhard Dengler joined the Party of Democratic Socialism (PDS) and remained active until the end of his life in the DRAFD (League of Germans in the Resistance, in the Armed Forces of the anti-Hitler coalition, and in the Free Germany movement / Deutscher in der Résistance, in den Streitkräften der Antihitlerkoalition). In 1993, Dengler participated in a veterans' trip to Stalingrad alongside Russian soldiers and described the experience as follows: "Genuine emotions arose when German and former Soviet veterans—their chests covered in medals—met informally at the opening of an exhibition at the Museum of the Battle of Stalingrad. Everyone hugged me. No one reviled us for being German. It is unforgettable." Dengler spent his final years in Berlin-Pankow and died on January 7, 2007. He is buried at the Chorin Monastery Cemetery alongside his wife, Gerda (1913–1998).

== Awards and honours ==
- Eisernes Kreuz Second and First Class
- German Cross in Gold on 25 January 1943
- Wound Badge in silver
- General Assault Badge
- Eastern Front Medal
- 1961 Patriotic Order of Merit in Bronze
- 1964 Patriotic Order of Merit in Silver
- 1989 Star of People's Friendship
- 1958 Medal for Fighters Against Fascism

== Publications ==
- Zwei Leben in einem, Berlin, Militärverlag der DDR, 1989
- Viele Beulen im Helm. Mein Leben als SED-Funktionär, Books-on-demand, 2000
