= Rudi Georgi =

German politician (1927–2020)

- Born: 25 December 1927; Bockau, Saxony, Germany
- Died: 18 March 2020 (aged 92)
- Occupation: Politician
- Political party: SPD; SED

Dr. Rudi Georgi (25 December 1927 in Bockau – 18 March 2020) was a German politician and public official in the German Democratic Republic.

Between 1973 and 1989 he served as a junior member of the country's Council of Ministers, being one of the (at times more than fifteen) government ministers responsible for an industrial sector deemed important enough to justify having its own minister: he was the "Minister for the Production of Tooling and Processing Machinery".

== Life ==
Georgi was born into a working-class family on Christmas Day 1927 in a small industrial town in the heart of Saxony's rich mining region, some 20 km (12 miles) north-west of the German frontier with Bohemia. He attended schools in nearby Aue before undertaking a clerical apprenticeship at the cutlery factory there.

Before his eighteenth birthday the war ended and Saxony now found itself in the Soviet occupation zone of what remained of Germany. During the next few years the entire zone would be politically reorganised under Soviet military administration, becoming a stand-alone Soviet sponsored state, the German Democratic Republic, which would formally be founded in 1949. Well before that, in 1946, the basis was prepared for a return to one- party government, with the forced merger across the zone of the old Communist Party (KPD) and the moderate left Social Democratic Party (SPD) to give birth to what would be East Germany's ruling Socialist Unity Party of Germany (SED), for most purposes a Soviet style Communist party by another name. Directly following the war Georgi signaled his interest in politics when he joined the SPD, but following the party merger in April 1946 he was one of the many SPD members who quickly accepted the invitation to sign their memberships across to the SED. The merger of the KPD and SPD had been presented as a merger of equals, but within a few years there were very few former SPD members left in positions of influence within the merged SED. However, in 1946 Georgi had also joined the Free German Youth (FDJ / Freie Deutsche Jugend) which traditionally had been the youth wing of the Communist Party in Germany.

Silver was mined locally and between 1950 and 1962 Georgi worked in the local Cutlery and Silverware factory, operated by the VEB Cutlery and Silverware Aue operation. Between 1951 and 1955 he was employed as a Production Manager, and from 1955 till 1962 he was the Works Director. Between 1957 and 1961 he successfully studied for an Economics degree through a correspondence course with the Karl Marx University (as it was then called) in Leipzig. Georgi then moved on, and in 1963 he became General Director with VVB Eisen-, Bleche- und Metallwaren (VVB EBM), an iron and steel products producer in Chemnitz. In April 1966 he received his doctorate, again from Karl Marx University in Leipzig. His doctoral dissertation, reflecting his job, was entitled "Problems of the further development of product-group work at VVB EBM to ensure needs-focused production in the entire industry branch".

Published works by Dr. Rudi Georgi

- Erfahrungen und Schlußfolgerungen aus der Arbeit der VVB Eisen-, Blech-, Metallwaren zur Steigerung der Arbeitsproduktivität, Berlin 1963
- Erfahrungen bei der Zusammenarbeit zwischen Ministerien und Kombinaten zur Erschließung qualitativer Wachstumsfaktoren, Berlin-Rahnsdorf 1981

Dr. Georgi's transfer into government came in 1963 when he was appointed Minister for the Construction of Industrial Machinery and Vehicles. The country's constitution by now asserted the leading role of The Party, so that in some ways it was the primary task of government ministers simply to carry out party policy, though at the higher levels the same individuals were generally in positions of power and influence in both institutions, making the distinction relatively unimportant. By 1963 there were approximately fifteen government ministers covering departments with areas of responsibility not dissimilar from their western equivalents. Additionally, however, by the time of the New Economic System of Planning and Direction (Neues Ökonomisches System der Planung und Leitung) established (formally) in 1961, there were a further (approximately) fifteen ministers with responsibility for individual industry sectors. From the perspective of Western observers, the industry sector-specific ministers came into focus when they appeared on East German stands at international trade fairs. In 1976, following a reconfiguration of industry ministry areas of responsibility, Georgi became the "Minister for the Production of Tooling and Processing Machinery". The construction of heavy plant and equipment was a traditional strength of the German economy which by now the Comecon planners were keep to promote, and Georgi was evidently good at his job, since unusually among his industry minister colleagues in 1976, he was still in post in 1989. Within the party his progress was slower. It was usual for candidates for membership of the Party Central Committee to remain on the list for several years, but Rudi Georgi was a candidate for Central Committee membership for nine years, between 1967 and 1976, which represented an unusually long wait. Between 1976 and 1989 he was one of the approximately 125 members of the Party Central Committee, however.

With his colleagues, he resigned his party and government offices in November/December 1989/1990.

== Awards and honours ==
- 1964 Banner of Labor
- 1970 Patriotic Order of Merit
- 1978 Banner of Labor
- 1986 Patriotic Order of Merit
