= Rudolf Steinwand =

German politician (1906–1982)

- Born: 4 August 1906; Boppard, Rhine Province, Prussia, German Empire
- Died: 10 November 1982 (aged 76); Lehnitz (Oranienburg), East Germany
- Occupation: Politician
- Political party: KPD; SED

Rudolf Steinwand (4 August 1906 – 10 November 1982) was a German politician (KPD, SED). Uncompromising in his political stance, he spent many of the twelve Hitler Years in prisons or concentration camps.

After 1949 he became a junior government minister in the German Democratic Republic.

== Life ==
Rudolf Steinwand was born in Boppard on the left bank of the Rhine Gorge. He came from a family of teachers. His own education was interrupted when he was exiled from the French occupation zone in connection with a civil passive disobedience campaign: he was obliged to defer his school final exams till 1928. Further progress towards qualifying as a teacher proved impossible due to lack of funds. He made a start on studying for a degree in Philology at Bonn, but the costs proved unsustainable. In 1930 he joined the German Communist Party. There was at this stage nothing illegal about Communist Party membership, but he was nevertheless arrested for his own illegal political activism.

1933 was a year of regime change as the German Nazi Party took power and lost little time in establishing one-party government in Germany. Communist Party membership was now by definition illegal and during 1933 Steinwand was taken into "protective custody". He was released in 1934 and resumed his work for the Communist Party. He was re-arrested in 1935 and spent most of the next four years incarcerated in a succession of establishments including the concentration camps at Esterwegen (in the extreme north-west of Germany) and at Sachsenhausen (near Berlin).

The leader's birthday in 1939 was marked with a limited amnesty for certain political prisoners and on 20 April 1939 Steinwand was released from prison: he immediately took a job as a bookkeeper with a large wine business. By early 1940 he had made his way back to the Koblenz area and joined up with Jakob Newinger, André Hoevel and the latter's wife Annelise. The politically committed friends came to be described as a small "political circle": they used to listen to foreign radio broadcasts and discuss the news. War had returned towards the end of 1939 and this sort of conduct was banned. Steinwand's own connections with the "Circle" were abruptly terminated in September/October 1941 when he was conscripted into the army. Before the end of 1941, reportedly because they had been denounced by someone, members of the "Circle" had been arrested and the Hoevels had been sentenced to death. Steinwand was also arrested and placed in a military prison. At some stage, however, he was released from prison and sent back to the army to fight on the Russian front.

Early in 1945 he managed to defect to the Red Army. He now became a prisoner of war of the Soviets and/or of the Americans. Source differ. The war ended in May 1945 and Rudolf Steinwald was quickly back in Germany, settling not in his Rhineland home region but in the Soviet occupation zone further towards the east of what remained of the country. The end of the war appeared to mark the end of one-party dictatorship, and following his release he lost no time in rejoining the no longer illegal Communist Party of Germany. He threw himself into reconstruction in the Soviet zone and in the German Democratic Republic which the entire region became, formally in October 1949. Before that, in April 1946, the authorities prepared the way for a rapid return to one-party government with the contentious merger of the Communist Party and the more moderately left-wing SPD. After a couple of years the formerly SPD members had been removed from positions of influence, leaving the new party looking like the old party with a new name. Steinwald had signed his Communist Party membership across to the new Socialist Unity party shortly after the merger in 1946 and now built his career as a party official. In 1946 he became a regional party head of personnel for the head office for state controlled enterprises in Thuringia. In December 1948 he was elected a member of the regional legislative assembly being set up by the German Economic Commission, a position he retained till 1949. Following the new country's foundation, between 1950 and 1954 he sat as a member of the National Legislative Assembly (Volkskammer).

From 1950 till 1952 was Plant Director at the Maxhütte Steel Mill. In 1952 he became department head at the Ministry for Mining and Metallurgy. He then became Secretary of State for Heavy Plant Construction. There followed a brief period working at the East German embassy in Moscow. From November 1955 till 1958 he himself served as the German Democratic Republic's Minister for Mining and Metallurgy. In February 1958 he was switched to the powerful National Planning Commission where he headed up the Extractive Industries Department.

He later became the deputy to the East German permanent representative to Comecon, a position he retained till 1966.

== Awards and honours ==
- 1955: Patriotic Order of Merit in bronze
- 1966: Patriotic Order of Merit in silver
- 1971: Patriotic Order of Merit in gold
- 1976: Patriotic Order of Merit gold clasp
- 1981: Star of People's Friendship in silver
