= Frank Bochow =

Member of the Volkskammer
- In office 1986–1989

Ambassador of the German Democratic Republic to Portugal
- In office 1977–1982
- Preceded by: Erich Butzke
- Succeeded by: Siegfried Kämpf

Personal details
- Born: 12 August 1937; Dresden, Saxony, Germany
- Died: 10 April 2012; Berlin, Germany
- Political party: SED
- Spouse: Margot
- Parent: Herbert Bochow
- Occupation: Diplomat, politician, tour guide
- Awards: Patriotic Order of Merit; Star of People's Friendship

Frank Bochow (12 August 1937 – 10 April 2012) was an East German trade unionist and diplomat. Between 1977 and 1982 he served as his country's ambassador in Portugal.

== Life ==
=== Formative years ===
Frank Bochow was born in Dresden shortly before the Second World War. His father, Herbert Bochow was a clerical worker, but is better remembered as a Communist who spent time in the concentration camp at Sachsenburg and on his release stayed in Germany to work for the overthrow of the Nazi regime. Following his third arrest, Herbert Bochow was executed by the Nazis at Plötzensee Prison on 11 March 1942. Through his life Frank Bochow retained an abiding hatred for the German Nazis who had "murdered his father" and as an old man he still would not hesitate to rail against former Nazis who had concealed their pasts and reappeared in West German public life In this respect he was a great admirer of the investigative journalism of Beate Klarsfeld.

=== Career ===
==== FDJ (Free German Youth) ====
Dresden was in the part of Germany that found itself in the Soviet occupation zone after 1945, and as Bochow grew up the entire region was being progressively developed into a stand-alone east German state, the German Democratic Republic, still governed according to one-party principals, but the party in question was no longer the Nazi party, and during the later 1940s Soviet administrators and troops were on hand to provide any support or guidance deemed necessary. As a boy Bochow was a "Friendship Council" leader with the Young Pioneers. In 1951 he joined the Free German Youth (FDJ / Freie Deutsche Jugend) and in 1955 the Free German Trade Union Federation (FDGB / Freier Deutscher Gewerkschaftsbund). 19 was the age at which FDJ members were typically recruited to the country's ruling Socialist Unity Party of Germany (SED / Sozialistische Einheitspartei Deutschlands) and in 1956 Bochow duly joined the SED, while retaining his membership of the FDJ.

Between 1955 and 1961 he attended the Moscow State Institute of International Relations, successfully obtaining a degree in Political Sciences at the end of his studies. On returning to East Germany he was recruited by Horst Schumann to the FDJ Central Council where he held a succession of political and administrative leadership positions. In 1963 he was sent to Budapest where, for two years, he had worked as the FDJ representative with the World Federation of Democratic Youth. Then, between 1965 and 1976, he worked as the Secretary for International Relations with the FDJ Central Council, during a decade in which international events provided abundant opportunity for honing his diplomatic judgement and skills as he exercised his duties. A particular career highlight during this time was the 10th World Festival of Youth and Students held in Berlin which he organised in 1973 and which was attended by more than 25,000 delegates.

==== Government service ====
Bochow transferred to government service in 1976, joining the Western Europe section of the East German Ministry for Foreign Affairs. Between 1977 and 1981 he served as his country's ambassador to Lisbon in succession to Erich Butzke. Portugal had recently undergone a revolution which had involved the removal, in 1974, of a right wing dictatorship, and Bochow was only the second ambassador to be sent to the country by the East German government. Bochow became much enamored with Portugal: he would later be remembered for the gusto with which he had sung Portuguese left wing patriotic songs such as "Grândola, Vila Morena" und "Avante Camarada" when, as ambassador, he was invited to participate in political rallies.

==== After the ambassadorship ====
On returning to Berlin he served, between 1982 and 1989, as Secretary for International Relations in the Federal Executive of the FDGB (Trade Union Federation). From 1986 till 1989 he sat as a member of the National Legislative Assembly (Volkskammer), where he served as Deputy Chairman of the Committee in Foreign Affairs.

=== Germany reunited ===
Frank Bochow's career in government came to an end with the end of the German Democratic Republic. He had briefly worked in a book printing/binding business as a young man, and now his first job after 1990 involved a return to book production which according to a friend involved heavy work, a five o clock start each morning, and a very small wage packet. Bochow later found congenial work with the sports-official-turned-holiday-operator Klaus Eichler, as a part-time specialist tour guide, each September conducting tour groups of no more than thirty travelers at a time to Portugal where he still had friends from his time as ambassador.

== Awards and honours ==
- 1971 Patriotic Order of Merit in Bronze
- 1973 Patriotic Order of Merit in Gold
- 1987 Star of People's Friendship in Silver (1987)
