= Georg Ulrich Handke =

German politician

Georg Ulrich Handke (Georg Handke)
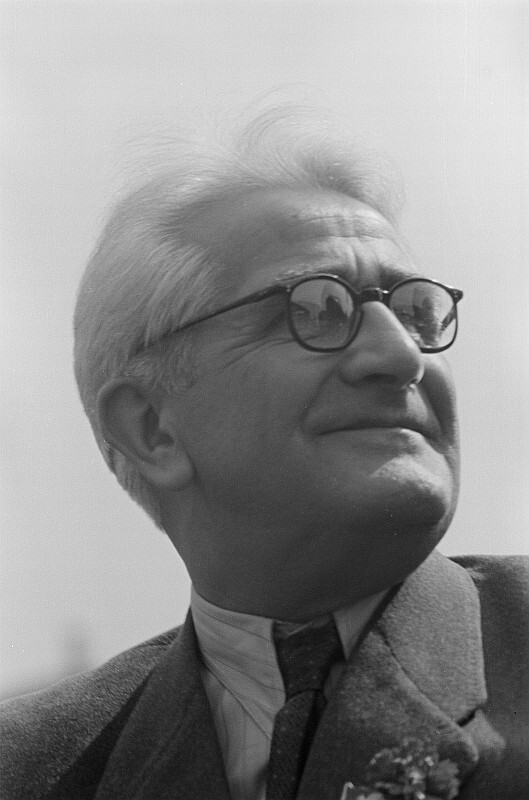
- Handke in 1951
- Born: 22 April 1894; Hanau, Hesse-Nassau, Germany
- Died: 7 September 1962 (aged 68); East Berlin, GDR (East Germany)
- Occupation: Politician
- Political party: USPD (1917–1918); KPD (1919–1921, 1923–1946); KAG (1921–1922); SED (1946–1962)
- Spouse: Emmi Handke (1947–1962)

Georg Ulrich Handke (22 April 1894 – 7 September 1962) was a German politician (Communist Party of Germany/Socialist Unity Party of Germany).

In 1958 he became one of the 111 members of the Party Central Committee in the German Democratic Republic. He had previously served as an ambassador and as government minister.

== Life ==
=== Early years ===
Handke was born into a working-class family in Hanau, a substantial town a short distance upstream of Frankfurt am Main. His father was a pipefitter. On leaving school he obtained a clerical traineeship with a bank. Following a further period at a commercially focused school he worked between 1913 and 1915 as a book-keeper.

Between 1915 and 1918 he undertook war-time military service. He served on the front-line in France, Italy and Romania.

=== Politics ===
==== Weimar years ====
Between 1911 and 1918 Handke was a member of Socialist Young Workers (SAJ / Sozialistische Arbeiter-Jugend) organisation. He joined the newly formed Independent Social Democratic Party of Germany in 1917. The Independent Social Democrats had broken with the more mainstream SPD primarily on account of the existing party's continuing support for the war. Like many of the Independent Social Democrat's founder, Handke went on to join the Spartacus League at the end of 1918 and, in 1919, remained with it when it became the Communist Party of Germany. He took part in the founding meeting of the party's Hanau branch under the pseudonym "Ernst Spinger". From 1919 he was also the editor in chief of the locally produced workers' newspaper and sat on the Hanau local council as a Communist party councilor. Beyond his party activism he was also a member of the Soldiers' Council that emerged in Hanau as part of the wider revolutionary turmoil that spread across Germany directly after the war.

During the early 1920s there was a further fragmentation of left wing parties in Germany, and following disagreements, apparently regarding tactics, in the wake of the March Action protests of 1921 Handke was among the Communist party members who broke away, following Paul Levi, to form the Communist Working Group. Handke rejoined the Communist party of Germany two years later (unlike Levi). In 1923 he joined the management team of the consumers' co-operative in Hanau, later also undertaking similar functions with the Co-op in Frankfurt. He was in addition, between 1923 and 1930, editor in chief of the Frankfurt "Arbeiter-Zeitung" ("Workers' Newspaper"). From 1930 till 1933 he was the leader of the Co-operatives department on the Communist Party Central Committee.

==== Nazi years ====
In January 1933 the Nazi Party took power and lost little time in establishing one-party government. Opposition parties were not actually outlawed till two months later at the end of March, but by that time measures had already been enacted which rendered illegal a final meeting of the KPD Central Committee that took place in Berlins's Sporthaus Ziegenhals on 7 February 1933, and at which Handke was one of the 37 participants. Despite the party having been outlawed Handke continued to work for it during 1933/34.

Less than a month after the Ziegelhaus meeting the Party leader, Ernst Thälmann, was arrested: he would later be shot after 11 years in solitary confinement. Two other senior party figures escaped to Paris and thereafter Moscow, where they would remain until after the Second World War. In contrast, Handke remained in Germany and was arrested in Berlin on 21 September 1934, for taking part the previous evening in an illegal meeting in the Breitenbach Square (with Nikolaus Thielen and two other members of the outlawed Communist Party). On 2 July 1935, he appeared before the Berlin People's Court, charged with conspiracy to commit high treason. The court convicted Handke and sentenced him to fifteen years imprisonment: seven were to be spent in solitary confinement.

==== Imprisonment and liberation ====
Handke was incarcerated initially at Schwalmstadt. He was moved to Rockenberg in 1936, Butzbach in 1939, to Kassel-Wehlheiden in 1940 and finally to Zwickau in 1944. Unlike many Communist comrades imprisoned under the Nazis, in May 1945 when the war ended Handke was still alive. He was released from the jail in Zwickau by the US 3rd Army which arrived in town on 17 April 1945, and in May Handke was installed by the military administrators as mayor of Zwickau. Zones of occupation in what would remain of Germany had already been agreed between the wartime allies, and the arrival of the Americans in this part of the country ahead of the Soviet army was not something the politicians' plans had anticipated: Handke's home region of Saxony was scheduled to end up in the Soviet occupation zone. At the end of June the Americans withdrew their fighting forces from West Saxony into Bavaria, and on 1 July 1945 Zwickau was occupied by the Red army. Many of the quasi-political appointments made by the Americans in the area were quickly reversed by the Soviet Military Administration, but the Soviets were content to leave the new mayor of Zwickau in his post and in due course to expand his administrative responsibilities in the region, where he became head of the administration in Zwickau-Plauen.

For the entire Soviet occupation he was also appointed vice-president, and then president, of the German Trade and Supplies Administration between July 1945 and 1948. In Saxony, he also sat as a member of the regional legislature in 1949/50. At the same time the entire region was being developed into a separate stand-alone Soviet sponsored German state, the German Democratic Republic, formally founded in October 1949. Already in April 1946, the merging of the old Communist Party and more moderately left wing Social Democratic Party into the new Socialist Unity Party had created the basis for a return to one-party government. Handke, a long-standing member of the Communist Party, now no longer illegal in Germany, like thousands of others, had lost little time in signing over his membership to the new Socialist Unity Party.

==== German Democratic Republic ====
In 1947 Handke married Emmy Thoma, like him a former party activist who had been arrested in 1934 and spent the Nazi years in a succession of jails. Emmi's first husband, a fellow Communist called Karl Thoma, had been arrested back in 1933 shortly after the Reichstag fire, but he had been released later in the decade and gone to Spain to fight in the Spanish Civil War. Emmi had not seen him since her own arrest in 1934.

Handke's political career assumed an increasingly national character within the East German state. Following on from his presidency of the Trade and Supplies commission, from 1948 till 1949 he was deputy president of the German Economic Commission. From October 1949 till November 1950 he served as a junior minister for inter-German trade, Foreign Trade and Supplies. His ministerial trade responsibilities continued till September 1952. Due to the policy setting role of the party, ministerial office was essentially a question of carrying out policies determined elsewhere, and Handke's work involved extensive travel and a relatively high public profile outside the German Democratic Republic. Recalling his work with the co-operative movement back in the 1920s in the Frankfurt region, he served between 1949 and 1952 as president of the Co-Op chain. He headed a trade delegation to Moscow in 1951/52, and further overseas experience came with his appointment, in October 1952, as his country's ambassador in Bucharest: a year later he was back working in Berlin where he became first deputy to the Minister for Foreign Affairs, and at the same time a member of the Foreign Affairs Commission of the Party Central Committee. Handke served on the Central Audit committee (Zentrale Revisionskommission) of the Party Central Committee between 1954 and 1958 and during this time was himself a candidate for Central Committee membership. In 1958 he became one of the Central Committee's 111 members.

He also served as president of the Society for German–Soviet Friendship from 1958 till 1962, in succession to (the younger) Friedrich Ebert.

=== Death and burial ===
Handke died in Berlin on 7 September 1962. His ashes were placed with those of other senior East German politicians in the "Socialists' Memorial" area ("Gedenkstätte der Sozialisten") at Berlin's Friedrichsfelde Central Cemetery.

== Awards and honours ==
- 1954 Patriotic Order of Merit in silver
- 1959 Order of Karl Marx
- 1960 Banner of Labor

In 1974 the national postal service issued a special postage stamp to celebrate what would have been Handke's 80th birthday.
