= Helene Berner =

Helene Berner (real name Helene Welker: 13 December 1904 – 22 December 1992) was a gymnastics teacher who became a German resistance activist. She spent most of the twelve Nazi Years exiled in Moscow, where she took Soviet citizenship and established (or re-discovered) her connections with the GRU (Soviet Military Intelligence). After 1945 she nevertheless returned to Berlin, becoming a party official in the Soviet occupation zone (relaunched in October 1949 as the German Democratic Republic / East Germany). Between 1949 and 1959 she was a senior officer at the Society for German–Soviet Friendship. She also became personal secretary to East Germany's Minister for Foreign Affairs, Georg Dertinger. Dertinger was not trusted by the party leadership, and it later emerged that Helene Berner was providing regular reports on him to the Ministry for State Security (Stasi).

== Life ==
Helene Welker was born in Berlin. Her father was a sculptor/stonemason and a party officer of the Social Democratic Party (which had been unbanned, renamed and relaunched in 1890). Her mother died young and her father remarried: she was bought up by her father and step mother, but left her parents' home directly after leaving school, when she was still only 14. In 1919 she initially entered domestic service. By 1930 she had switched to office work and completed an apprenticeship in the wholesale book trade. In 1927 she started working as a nurse with a focus on Orthopaedics.

== Career ==
Welker joined the Young Communists in 1923. In 1927 she joined the party. Almost immediately she started working for the party's "M-Apparat", which operated in Germany till 1937 as the Communist Party's (rather misleadingly named) intelligence branch. Between 1927 and 1931 she engaged in various industrial espionage missions on behalf of the Communist Party.

Between 1931 and June 1935 Welker was employed as the manager at the Orthopaedic Gymnastics institute of the Berlin Health Insurance organisations (Krankenkassen) in the city centre. After the National Socialist take-over in January 1933 and the transformation to one-party dictatorship, the Communist Party was banned. Helene Welker nevertheless worked alongside others on party matters. This included courier work with the "frontier section" ("Grenzapparat ") which was involved in helping people risking arrest for reasons of politics and / or race to escape from Germany into Czechoslovakia. Her own apartment became a secret meeting point and, at times, an office location for party comrades, notably Wilhelm Bahnik whose secretary she later became. Others involved in this resistance group included Felix Bobek, Luise Kraushaar and Ewald Jahnen. Using the cover names "Leni" and "Lore" she was also undertaking work with GRU (Soviet Military Intelligence). In June 1935, threatened with imminent arrest, Welker herself crossed into Czechoslovakia, from where she made her way to the Soviet Union. During 1936. she was tried in her absence back in Germany, and sentenced to death. In July 1936 she took Soviet citizenship.

During 1935/36, Welker worked for the Red Army General Staff as an expert on intelligence operations. Between April 1936 and May 1937 she was employed at a Moscow Orthopaedic clinic. Then, between 1937 and 1941 she worked as a language teacher with the Army General Staff, later becoming a teacher at a Moscow military academy, relocating with the academy to Stavropol when the Hitler-Stalin non-aggression pact turned sour. During 1942/43, she became a graduate student at the "Comintern Academy" in Kushnarenkovo. That was followed by specialist parachute-agent training from which she emerged as an officer of the Red Army. During 1944, Welker worked as an educator near the frontline on the Second Baltic Front (centred at different stages on Kholm and Opochka). She was also involved in preparations for the advance towards the German cities.

At the start of 1941 the Reich Security Main Office in Berlin included Helene Berner's name on one of their "Special 'wanted' lists" of anti-government German political refugees (and others) to be sought out by the Gestapo, and dealt with as a priority, following a successful German invasion of the country in which they had found refuge. It is not clear whether it was because of some fundamental intelligence failing, or merely the result of a clerical error, that her name was included not on the "Special 'wanted' List" for the Soviet Union but on that for Britain.

After the war ended she returned to Berlin, now using what had been her party name in Moscow, Helene Berner, as her only name. Between May and September 1945, still a Red Army officer, she led education courses at the Prisoner of War camp in Rüdersdorf, just outside Berlin on its eastern side. Then, between January 1946 and April 1948, she taught at the special academy set up in Königs Wusterhausen by the Soviet Military Administration to train future cadres of the Block Parties. These Block Parties were an important feature of the highly centralised Leninist power structure which had existed in the Soviet Union since the 1920s and was now being implemented in a number of central European former democracies and in the Soviet occupation zone of Germany. In 1949 Helene Berner was demobilised, which put an end both to her Red army service responsibilities and to her intelligence activities on behalf of the GRU. Directly after the foundation of the German Democratic Republic in October 1949 Berner became an officer of the Society for [East] German-Soviet Friendship ("Gesellschaft für Deutsch-Sowjetische Freundschaft" / DSF). She also worked, till 1959, as head of the employee training department at the Ministry for Foreign Affairs. In addition, during 1952/53 she was employed as a personal assistant/secretary to the East German Foreign Minister, Georg Dertinger. During this time she was providing regular reports on her minister to the Ministry for State Security (Stasi). (Georg Dertinger fell out of favour dramatically in January 1953 when he was arrested. He faced a show trial for alleged espionage in 1954 and was sentenced to 15 years of hard labor.)

Between 1959 and her retirement in 1968 Helene Berner ran the DSF, which was accommodated in the impressive Palais am Festungsgraben (as it has subsequently become known – loosely, "Moated Palace"), in the heart of East Berlin.

Helene Berner died in Berlin at the end of 1992, slightly more than two years after the formal reunification date. In 1990 she had joined the Party of Democratic Socialism (PDS), a rebranded version of the old East German ruling Socialist Unity Party of Germany which was in the process of reconfiguring itself for a western syle democratic future.

== Awards and honours ==
- 1955 Patriotic Order of Merit in Bronze
- 1957 Badge of Honour of the Society for German–Soviet Friendship
- 1965 Patriotic Order of Merit in Silver
- 1970 Order of the Patriotic War First Class (a Soviet honour)
- 1974 Patriotic Order of Merit in Gold
- 1979 Patriotic Order of Merit Honor clasp in Gold
- 1984 Star of People's Friendship
- 1989 Star of People's Friendship
