= Star of Peoples' Friendship =

Star of Peoples' Friendship Stern der Völkerfreundschaft
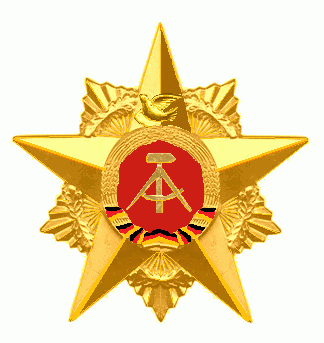
- Grand Star of Peoples' Friendship
- Type: Three-class order
- Awarded for: Exceptional merit for contributing to the "understanding and friendship between nations and preservation of peace"
- Presented by: East Germany
- Status: No longer awarded
- Established: 20 August 1959
- Grand Star ribbon bar Gold Star ribbon bar Silver Star ribbon bar

Precedence
- Next (higher): Hero of Labour
- Next (lower): Patriotic Order of Merit

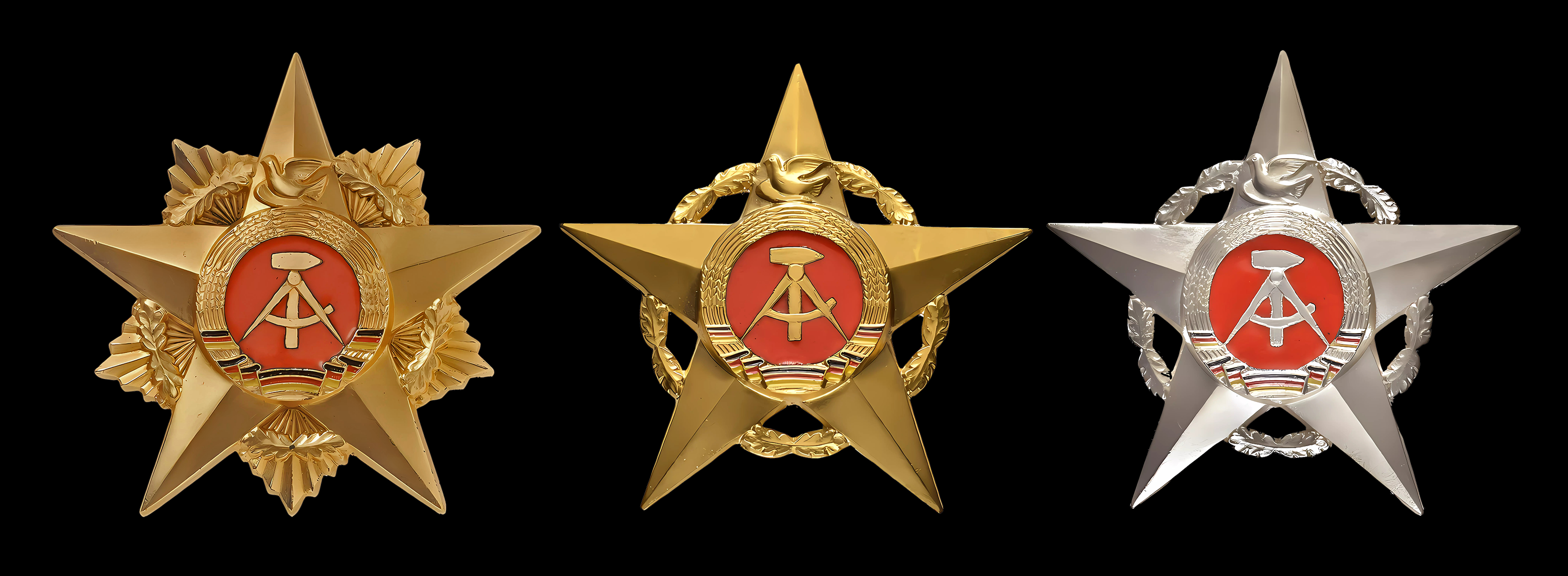
Grand Star, Star in Gold, Star in Silver

The Star of Peoples' Friendship (German: Stern der Völkerfreundschaft), a.k.a. Star of Nations' Friendship, was an order awarded by the German Democratic Republic (GDR).

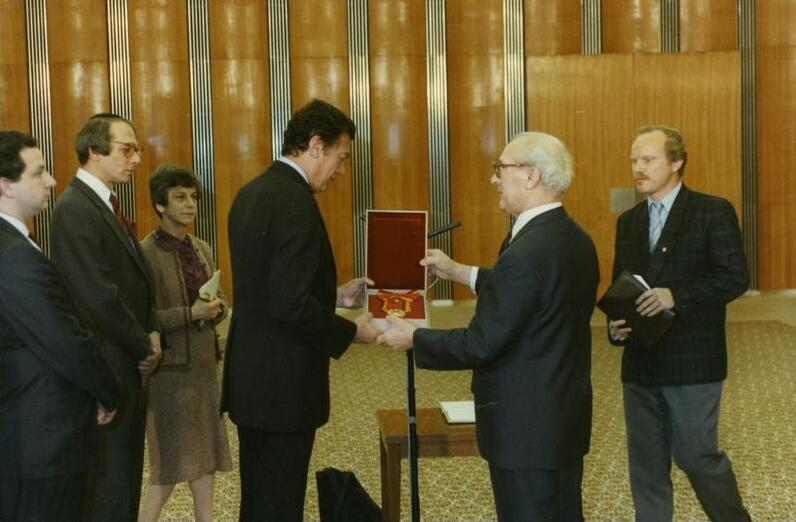
Awarding of the order by Erich Honecker, 1988

Established 20 August 1959, it was given to individuals of exceptional merit who had contributed to the "understanding and friendship between nations and preservation of peace".

The Star of Peoples' Friendship was given in three classes:

1st Class – Grand Star of Peoples' Friendship (German: Großer Stern der Völkerfreundschaft)
2nd Class – Star of Peoples' Friendship in Gold (German: Stern der Völkerfreundschaft in Gold)
3rd class – Star of Peoples' Friendship in Silver. (German: Stern der Völkerfreundschaft in Silber)

It was awarded on the recommendation of the presidency of the Council of Ministers (German: Präsidium des Ministerrates) via the chairman of the Council of State (German: Vorsitzender des Staatsrates) or in its name.

The medal was awarded with a certificate.

== Notable recipients ==
Name	Year
Heinz Abraham	1986
(Soviet Union) Pyotr Abrassimov	
Alexander Abusch	1977
Paula Acker	1988
Theo Adam	1989
Rudolf Agsten	1986
Kurt Anclam	1983
Eva Altmann	1979
Uwe Ampler	1988
Friedel Apelt	1982
Erich Arendt	1983
Karin Balzer	
Walter Bartel	
Jutta Behrendt	
Walter Beling	
Hilde Benjamin	1982
Fritz Bennewitz	
Helene Berg	1976
Helene Berner	
Lothar Berthold	
Manfred Bochmann	
Frank Bochow	1987
Lothar Bolz	1968
(Soviet Union) Yuri Bondarev	
Edgar Bronfman, Sr.	1988
Werner Bruschke	
Hermann Budzislawski	1976
Sabine Busch	
(Cuba) Fidel Castro	1972
(Soviet Union) Vasily Chuikov	
(France) Auguste Cornu	1978
Franz Dahlem	1970
Franz Dahlem	1977
(Austria) Mathilde Danegger	
Heinrich Dathe	
Gerhard Dengler	
Heike Drechsler	
Friedrich Ebert Jr.	
(Soviet Union) Konstantin Fedin	
Peter Florin	1985
Kerstin Förster	
Heike Friedrich	
Emil Fuchs	1969
Heinz Galinski	
Hartwig Gauder	
Sylvia Gerasch	
Hans Gericke	
Manfred Gerlach	1964
Maxi Gnauck	
Marlies Göhr	
Ernst Goldenbaum	1969
Harry Goldschmidt	
Otto Gotsche	
Klaus Gysi	1987
Emmi Handke	
Eberhard Heinrich	1986
Leonhard Helmschrott	1975
Hermann Henselmann	
Lutz Heßlich	
Olaf Heukrodt	
Wolfgang Heyl	
Wolfgang Hoppe	
Carola Hornig	
(Bulgaria) Aleksi Ivanov	1986
Hans Jendretzky	
Sabine John	
Wolfgang Junker	1984
Heinz Kamnitzer	
(Soviet Union) Ekaterina Katukova	
Georg Knepler	
Marita Koch	
Johannes-Ernst Köhler	
Erwin Kramer	1977
Frank Kretschmer	1987
Sylvio Kroll	
Greta Kuckhoff	1972
Jürgen Kuczynski	1979
(Soviet Union) Viktor Kulikov	1985
Paul Kurzbach	
Bernhard Lehmann	
Alfred Lemmnitz	1985
Wolfgang Lesser	
Kurt Liebknecht	
(Soviet Union) Pavel Lisitsian	1988
Christa Luding-Rothenburger	
Kurt Maetzig	
(South Africa) Nelson Mandela	1988
(Soviet Union) Vasily Margelov	1978
Walter Markov	
Hermann Matern	1967
Gisela May	
(Canada) Hugh McLean	1990
Else Merke	
Karl Mewis	1977
(Soviet Union) Sergey Mikhalkov	1983
(Italy) Gabriele Mucchi	
Helga Mucke-Wittbrodt	
(Greece) Estrongo Nachama	1988
Heinz Neukirchen	
(Greece) Thomas Nicolaou	
Otto Niebergall	
Albert Norden	1974
Albert Norden	1979
Měrćin Nowak-Njechorński	1976
Karl Obermann	
Oktoberklub	1986
Harry Ott	
Kristin Otto	
(Soviet Union) Yuri Ozerov (director)	
Gret Palucca	
(Greece) Andreas Papandreou	1985
(Soviet Union) Patriarch Pimen I of Moscow	
Hans Pischner	1979
Lydia Poser	
Denis Pritt	1965
Bernhard Quandt	
Eberhard Rebling	
Dean Reed	1985
Rüdiger Reiche	
Ludwig Renn	1979
Trude Richter	
Hans Rietz	
Ilse Rodenberg	
Willy Rumpf	1978
Alexander Schalck-Golodkowski	1984
Dietmar Schauerhammer	
Hans Schaul	
Karl Schirdewan	
Eva Schmidt-Kolmer	
Heinz Schmidt	
Rita Schober	
Paul Scholz	1969
Paul Scholz	1976
(Soviet Union) Dmitri Shostakovich	1972
Peter Schreier	
Albert Schreiner	
Martina Schröter	
Ewald Schuldt	
Sylvia Schwabe	
Anna Seghers	1970
Kurt Seibt	1978
Kurt Seibt	1983
Max Seydewitz	
Eleonore Staimer	
Luitpold Steidle	
Rudolf Steinwand	
Leo Stern (historian)	
(Bulgaria) Petur Tanchev	1986
(Soviet Union) Nikolai Tikhonov	
(Socialist Federal Republic of Yugoslavia) Josip Broz Tito	1966
Roswitha Trexler	1984
Michael Tschesno-Hell	
(Mongolia) Yumjaagiin Tsedenbal	
Lotte Ulbricht	1988
Frank Ullrich	
Paul Verner	1986
Paul Wandel	1970
Walter Weidauer	
Helene Weigel	
Josef Wenig	
(Bulgaria) Spas Wenkoff	
Deba Wieland	
Hans-Joachim Willerding	1989
Otto Winzer	1975
(Greece) Charilaos Florakis	1979

== See also ==
- Awards and decorations of East Germany
