= Josef Wenig =

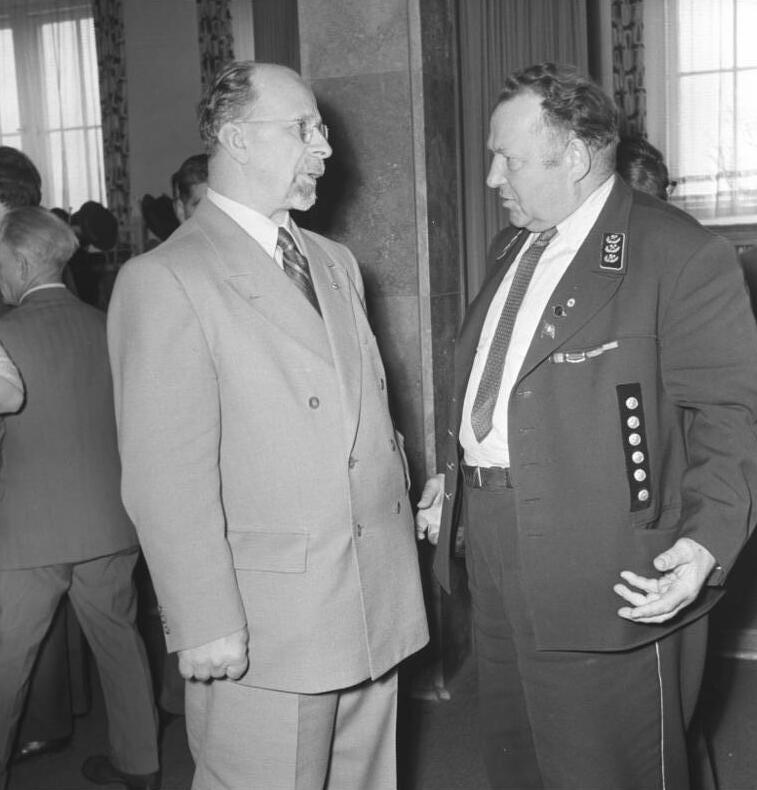
Sepp Wenig with Walter Ulbricht (1959)

Josef Wenig (17 July 1896 – 16 April 1981) was a German labour and political activist (KPD). After 1945 he became an important figure in the East German political establishment. He was a member of the ruling party's powerful Central Committee between 1954 and his death in 1981. He was also a member of the country's (less powerful) National Parliament ("Volkskammer") between 1950 and 1981.

== Life ==
Josef ("Sepp") Wenig was born in Leiter (now Řebří, a part of Svojšín), a small village in the hills to the west of Plzeň in what was, at that time, western Bohemia, part of the Austro-Hungarian empire. His parents worked in a brickworks. However, by the time he was old enough to attend school the family had relocated to Germany, and he grew up in another rural location, Zeulenroda, a small country town to the west of Chemnitz.

He left school in 1911. During the next three years, without at this stage entering into any formal training scheme, he took jobs in various sectors including transport and brick making. In 1914 he was conscripted into the army, serving throughout the war. After 1918 he worked in the transport sector till 1918 in Zeulenroda and in nearby Kahla. In March 1920 he was an active participant in the successful popular resistance to the Kapp Putsch. In 1924 he joined the recently formed Communist Party, remaining a member till the party was banned in the first part of 1933. He also became a member of the Red Front Fighter's League, effectively a quasi-military wing of the Communist Party. In 1929, possibly in response to the economic crisis, he abandoned his life on land and took work as a sailor. Between 1936 and 1939 he undertook a training as a ship's mechanic. After this, between 1939 and 1945, he worked as a boilerman and machinist on merchant ships.

After the war Wenig returned to Zeulenroda, liberated from the Nazi regime a few months earlier by the United States Army, but now administered as part of the Soviet occupation zone. He worked again in the transport sector for a local wholesaler. He reactivated his Communist Party membership and was one of thousands, in the Soviet zone, who lost no time in signing their party membership over to the Socialist Unity Party (Sozialistische Einheitspartei Deutschlands; SED) following its contentious creation in April 1946.

In 1948 Sepp Wenig responded to advertisements offering employment at the Wismut which was being set up to operate uranium mines in the south-east of the Soviet zone. He gained rapid promotion, although at this stage top management positions in what was recognised as a strategically critical sector were reserved for Soviet personnel. It was a feature of the Soviet occupation zone, relaunched in October 1949 as the German Democratic Republic, that the ruling party was closely integrated into workplace structures, and from 1949 Sepp Wenig was a member of the SED sector leadership team (SED-Gebietsleitung) at Wismut. 1949 was also the year in which he was appointed a labour inspector at the company's Schneeberg and Auerbach mines.

During his career Josef Wenig received a remarkable number and range of honours from the state: the Hero of Labour award which he received in 1950 appears to have been the first of these. His immediate achievement had involved greatly exceeding a standard production quota. It was also in 1950 that he became a member of the National Parliament (Volkskammer). Although voters were able only to vote for (or, at least in theory, against) a single list of candidates in general elections, the Volkskammer contained fixed quotas of members from various approved bloc parties and indeed from approved mass organisations. Sepp Wenig sat, formally, not as a representative of the ruling party but as a representative of the Trade Union Federation (Freier Deutscher Gewerkschaftsbund; FDGB). He was also a member of the FDGB national executive (Bundesvorstand) between 1952 and 1958.

In 1954 he became one of the 91 members of the Central Committee, formally the ruling party's leading element (except when a party conference was in session). He was still a member when he died twenty-six years later. Meanwhile, the ban on German nationals in top management positions at Wismut had been relaxed and in 1955 he moved to Karl-Marx-Stadt (as Chemnitz was then known) and became the company's General Director, with direct responsibility for the "Labour department". The Central Committee's congratulations to Wenig on reaching his 65th birthday follow the familiar formula. It is perhaps a more eloquent testimony to the way in which his contribution was valued by the authorities that he retained this post till 1966, when at the age of 70 he had comfortably passed the normal retirement age. He only retired formally in July 1968, by which time he was 72.

Josef Wenig died in Karl-Marx-Stadt on 16 April 1981.

== Awards and honours (not a complete list) ==
- 1950 Hero of Labour
- 1951 National Prize of the German Democratic Republic
- 1954 Patriotic Order of Merit bronze or silver
- 1955 Fritz Heckert Medal
- 1961 Patriotic Order of Merit silver or gold
- 1961 Distinguished Service Medal of the National People's Army
- 1966 Order of Lenin (Soviet honour)
- 1970 Patriotic Order of Merit gold clasp
- 1971 Order of Karl Marx
- 1976 Fritz Heckert Medal in gold
- 1976 Star of People's Friendship

In Zeulenroda and in Johanngeorgenstadt Polytechnic Secondary Schools were named after Josef Wenig. However, after 1990 the names were changed again, in the context of a wider reconfiguring of the schools system in what had been the German Democratic Republic.
