= Bockau =

- Municipality
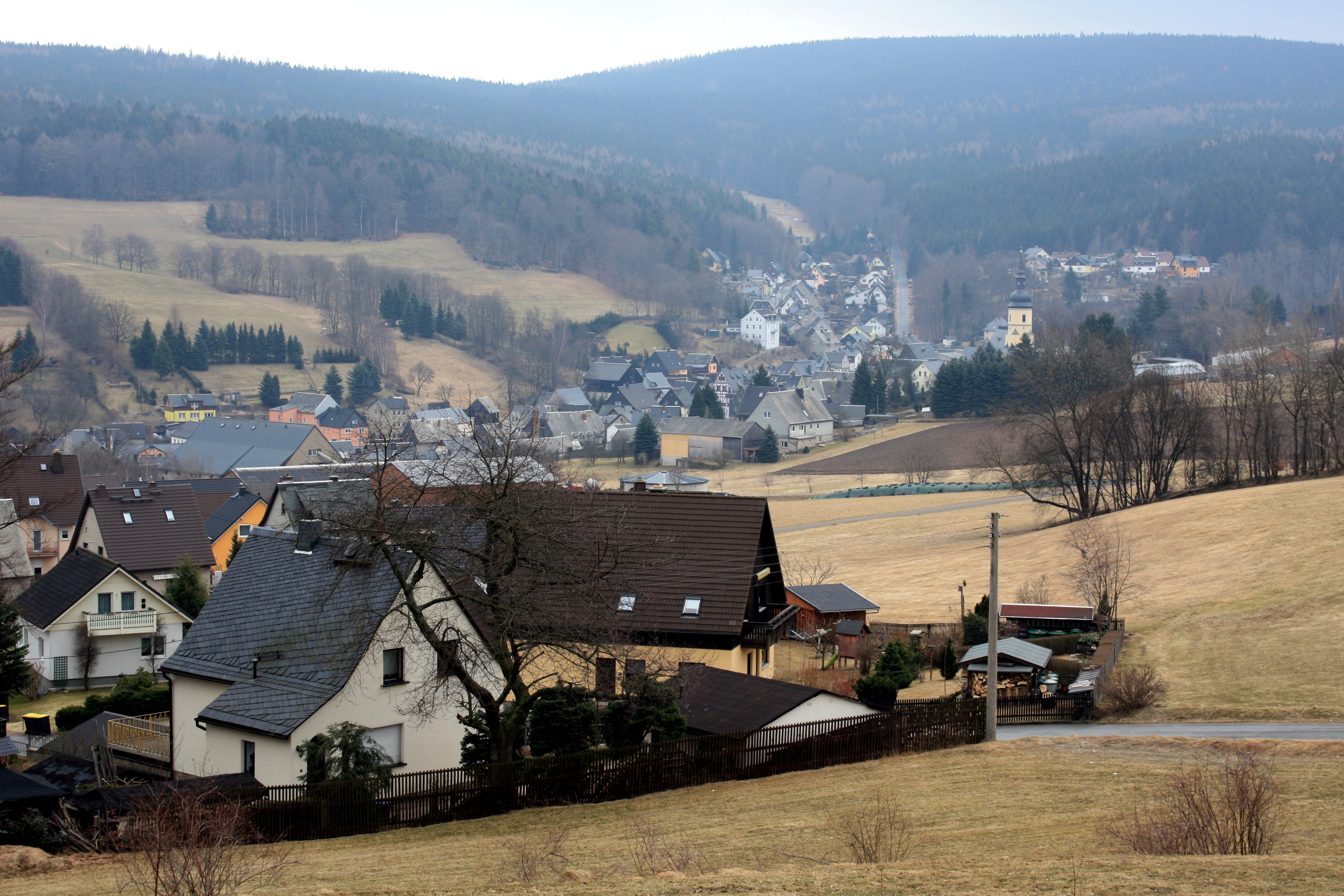
- View over Bockau

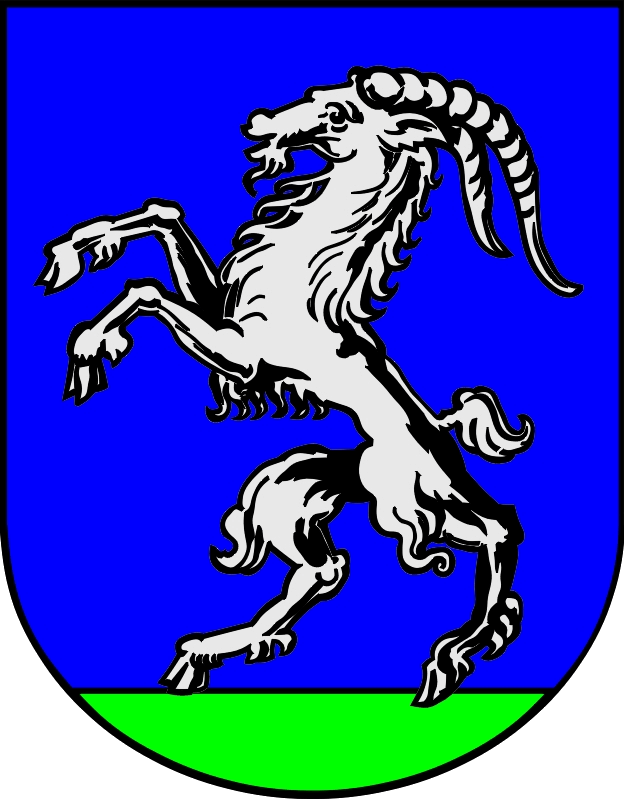
- Coat of arms

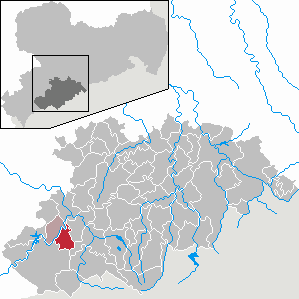
- Location of Bockau within Erzgebirgskreis district
- Interactive map of Bockau
- Location within Germany Location within Saxony
- Coordinates: 50°33′N 12°42′E
- Country: Germany
- State: Saxony
- District: Erzgebirgskreis

Government
  - Mayor (2023–30): Franziska Meier

Area
  - Total: 19.15 km^{2} (7.39 sq mi)
- Elevation: 450–550 m (1,480–1,800 ft)

Population (2025-12-31)
  - Total: 2,054
  - Density: 107.3/km^{2} (277.8/sq mi)
- Time zone: UTC+01:00 (CET)
  - Summer (DST): UTC+02:00 (CEST)
- Postal codes: 08324
- Dialling codes: 03771
- Vehicle registration: ERZ, ANA, ASZ, AU, MAB, MEK, STL, SZB, ZP
- Website: www.bockau.de

Bockau is a municipality in the district of Erzgebirgskreis in the Free State of Saxony in Germany. The community is known for growing and researching herbs. Owing to its centuries-old cultivation of angelica, whose roots are used in making liqueurs, Bockau is also known locally by the nickname Wurzelbucke (Wurzel is German for “root”).

== Geography ==
=== Location ===
The place lies in the western Ore Mountains in a sheltered hollow in a side valley off the Zwickauer Mulde valley, stretching up to the Ochsenkopf bei Jägerhaus, an 823-m-high mountain.

=== Neighbouring communities ===
Bordering on Bockau are Aue, Lauter, Schwarzenberg, Sosa and Zschorlau.

== History ==
In the late 15th century, farmers began gathering medicinal herbs from meadows and woods and to ply a trade with them. Important to the herbal lore were, among others, spignel, lovage, angelica, valerian and rhubarb. From the roots’ essential oils they mixed medicinal tinctures, essences and pills. Not least of all, they burnt schnaps. The research establishment grew out of this. Later, herbs were grown in dedicated fields, with angelica plants even being grown as late as 1989. The roots were exported to several European countries and overseas. With the changes in the East Bloc, local herb growers were left to themselves and their herbs.

A long tradition was threatening to wither and die. Since that time, many in Bockau have been growing the herbs in their gardens and never tire of telling of the valuable angelica roots’ medicinal properties or of using them for their health.

Drawn by the großer Berggeschrey (“Great Call of the Mountains”) to the Ore Mountains in the 16th century (silver, tin, cobalt, white earth and gravel mining), many settlers came here from the Harz Mountains and found a new home. Bockau received status as a mining area, comparable to status as a mining town, although Bockau was not actually considered a town. Specialists and academics, too, settled here.

In 1750, Gottlieb Lorenz introduced vitriolic acid distilling into Bockau. From gravelly ores mined in the area, such as pyrite, which yield sulphur salts (vitriol) came, after weeks of heating and “cooking” in stone vats, concentrated sulphuric acid, also called vitriolic acid. This was put to use in medicine and was an important raw material for both inorganic and organic chemistry. About 1760 there were already 7 vitriol plants in town, and by 1812 there were 24 distilleries in operation. Important sidelines for the farmers were tree felling, charcoal making, resin harvesting (this was limited by decree to a patch of the woods known as the Harzweide, or “resin meadow”, to prevent widespread damage to the forest ) and log driving.

Even cobalt ore was a raw material for a new branch of industry. Peter Weidkammer, a man from Franconia, succeeded in 1520 in making a dye out of it. However, it was only after about 100 years that the Saxon Elector Johann Georg I allowed the founding of several “dyemills”. Erasmus Schindler secured approval in 1649 to build one of the five great dyeworks in the Ore Mountains.

The blue dye made from the ore was used for colouring both glass and enamel, for ceramic glazing and later for painting porcelain. For Saxony's economy, this dye was an important export item. When the Aue-Adorf railway line was built in 1875, the dyeworks succeeded in having the foreseen station for Bockau built right near the works, thereby significantly improving transport conditions. When King Albert of Saxony visited the community on 7 July 1880, the factory's reputation was enhanced. The mining industry's heyday stretched into the 19th century.

Even in Bockau, the Thirty Years' War wrought its wrath. In 1632 Bockau was sacked by Heinrich von Holk's troops. In 1633, 108 of the community's 500 inhabitants lost their lives to the plague. The Swedes brought much wretchedness to the mountains; in 1640 alone, 6 Bockauers were murdered by them.

The year 1678 was a very important one for Bockau, as it was then that it became an independent parish. The Baroque church that stands today had however already been consecrated in 1637.

In 1747, Master George (or Georg) Körner became the church minister in Bockau. He was a chronicler and a linguist as well as the founder of the Bockauer jährliche Nachrichten (Bockau Yearly News”). George Körner's work lives on in the club Magister George Körner Gesellschaft e.V. at the Körner Haus together with a German-Czech meeting centre.

The nineteenth century brought Bockau new kinds of livelihood, while the traditional herbal industry fell ever more by the wayside owing to modern medicine and pharmacy. Basketweaving from spruce splints became an outgrowth of boxmaking.

Glovemaking and the introduction of metalworking at the die and enamel works brought further employment and earnings. The first clubs came into being, among them the sport club, founded in 1869, the marksmen's club, founded in 1871, the poultry raisers’ club, founded in 1872, the Erzgebirgszweigverein (“Ore Mountain Branch Club”), founded in 1888, and also the volunteer fire brigade, founded in 1867.

Workers also now worked in the neighbouring areas around Bockau, also in Aue, Schwarzenberg and Lauter. Political parties and trade unions were organized. Many people fell victim to the two world wars. A calming and hopeful beacon throughout these troubled times was the Evangelical Lutheran Church.

In 1886 and 1887, the current primary school was built. Under the auspices of the workers’ club, gymnastics club and sport club, the outdoor swimming pool and the sporting ground were realized.

From 1952 to 1990, Bockau was part of the Bezirk Karl-Marx-Stadt of East Germany. In 1950 came the merger of three small liqueur distilleries into today's Erzgebirgische Destillerie und Liqueurmanufaktur GmbH Bockau. In 1964, the groundwork was laid for today's middle school.

Already by 1900, Bockau had become known to Saxon citydwellers as a summer health resort. They came from Leipzig, Zwickau and elsewhere, travelling comfortably by rail. There were plenty of rental rooms and inns in Bockau and its environs. This development continued after the Second World War. In 1965, Bockau became a state-recognized health resort (Erholungsort), a title that today's Bockauers still value. There came company holiday homes, and the local holiday services offered holidaymakers a varied programme, changed every fortnight, during their stay.

In the postwar years, when many people began to think, looking back on the war, that there must be a better way than wars and racial hatred, there arose the idea of friendly partnerships between towns in one country or in different nations. In 1957, the World Federation of Partner Towns was founded. Thus also arose the wish in Bockau to have some kind of partnership with West Germany.

Through the Bockau master joiner Werner Teubner's family ties with Werner Herzog, the mayor of Herrieden, a small town in Middle Franconia, then part of West Germany, the first contacts were established. On 3 October 1990 – the day of German Reunification – the partnership document was signed. At this time, Herrieden already had a partnership arrangement with the Austrian town of Melk. This was also the basis for establishing ties with that town on the Danube at the entrance to the picturesque Wachau.

Club life almost died out in the time when Bockau found itself in East Germany. It only revived in the 1990s after the political changes wrought by Reunification. Until that time there had simply been interest associations, above all in the field of sport. As of 1990, former clubs had new life breathed into them, and new members joined.

There are many events organized each year by the local clubs, such as the Buchberglauf, which is a walk event held in February; the Angelika Cross Lauf on 3rd of October; the Wurzelfest – when the Wurzelkönigin ("Root Queen") is chosen – on the third week-end in August; and the Bockauer Kirmes in November.

Over the last few years, great pains have been undertaken to offer industrial operations and crafts new locations for expansion, to maintain and improve the community's economic structure. In connection with the European initiative for rural reform, it is the community's wish to have a commercial-industrial area built by attracting investment in the near future to develop the 8.5 ha site where once stood the old paper factory.

To avoid demand for meadowland, it is important to clean up old industrial sites so that they can be used by new operations and services. This is a meaningful process for the further development of the Naturpark Erzgebirge/Vogtland, and it could also contribute to mitigating the whole problem of economic and social problems.

On 13 April 1930, a university student from Leipzig named Elisabeth Charlotte Müller fell victim to a violent sexual crime in the woods next to the road between Bockau and Jägerhaus. Her murderer, Willy Leischke, was caught, but killed himself in prison. At the scene of the crime, a memorial stone was laid. The event occupied the population and the daily press for months.

=== Religion ===
Both the Evangelical Lutheran Church and the Evangelical Methodist Church are represented in Bockau.

=== Population development ===
All following figures are for 31 December in the given year.

1982 to 1988

- 1982 − 3603
- 1983 − 3573
- 1984 − 3506
- 1985 − 3472
- 1986 − 3436
- 1987 − 3346
- 1988 − 3283

1989 to 1995

- 1989 − 3203
- 1990 − 3112
- 1991 − 3052
- 1992 − 2955
- 1993 − 2950
- 1994 − 2930
- 1995 − 2878

1996 to 2002

- 1996 − 2870
- 1997 − 2836
- 1998 − 2824
- 1999 − 2815
- 2000 − 2760
- 2001 − 2736
- 2002 − 2705

2003 to 2006

- 2003 − 2652
- 2004 − 2633
- 2005 − 2609
- 2006 − 2600

Source: Statistisches Landesamt des Freistaates Sachsen

== Partner towns ==
- Bad Sachsa in the south Harz
- Herrieden

== Culture and sightseeing ==
- Vitriolölhütte (vitriol distillery)
- Wurzelstube (root cellar)
- Magister Georg Körner Haus
- Steinbackofen (stone oven)
- Wildgehege (game enclosure)

=== Clubs ===
- Verein zur Förderung des Feuerwehrwesens in der Gemeinde Bockau (Club for the furthering of the fire brigade's presence in the community of Bockau)
- SC Teutonia Bockau
- Skiverein Bockau (skiing)
- Schützengesellschaft Bockau (marksmanship)
- Magister Georg Körner Gesellschaft e.V., Bockau
- Musikverein Holzhacker e. V.

== Economy and infrastructure ==
- Werkzeugbau Ullmann, cutting tools and dies
- Behälterbau Zeeh, building and installation of backup memories
- Elektrotechnik Günther
- Bauschlosserei Vulturius, building fitters
- Bagger- und Tiefbauarbeiten Zeeh, digging and civil engineering
- Schmiede & Metallbau Gerd Zeeh, smiths and metal structure

== Notable people ==
- Rudi Georgi (born 1927), East German economic functionary
- Siegfried "Hans" Siegel (25 July 1918 — 18 April 2002)
- Liddy Hegewald (22 September 1884 – 1950), Silent Film Producer, Owner of Hegewald Film

=== Persons connected with the community ===
- Georg(e) Körner (born 28 November 1717 in Pölbitz; died 3 May 1772 in Bockau) clergyman, chronicler and language researcher
- Sebastian Weiß (born about 1450; died about 1500 in Bockau) mentioned in 1495 as a tradesman in herbs, founded medicinal herb trade in the western Ore Mountains.

== Titles and nicknames ==
- State-recognized health resort
- Laborantenort (research community)
- Kräuterort (herb community)
- Gebirgsdorf (mountain community)
- Wurzelbucke
- Waldhufendorf (≈ forest homestead village)
