= Eva Schmidt-Kolmer =

- Born: Eva Kolmer; 25 June 1913; Vienna, Austro-Hungary
- Died: 29 August 1991 (aged 78); Berlin, Germany
- Occupations: physician political activists university teacher social psychologist specialising in pediatrics
- Political party: KPÖ; SED
- Spouse(s): 1. Jakob Wolloch; 2. Heinz Schmidt (1906–1989)
- Children: 1. Renate 1947; 2. Walter 1950
- Parent(s): Walther Kolmer (1879–1931); Lili Erika Berger/Pereles (1887–1942)

Eva Schmidt-Kolmer (25 June 1913 – 29 August 1991) was an Austrian-German physician, university teacher and social psychologist. After 1949 she became an influential researcher into early childhood in the German Democratic Republic, working at the interface between medicine and pedagogy.

== Life ==
=== Family provenance and early years ===
Eva Kolmer was born in Vienna into a Protestant family of Jewish provenance. Her parents were both members of the Reformed church that traced its inauguration back to Huldrych Zwingli, and they both voted for the Social Democrats. Eva was the eldest of her parents' four children. Walther Kolmer (1879–1931), her father, held a position as "Imperial and Royal Adjunct Professor" in Human Medicine and Biology at the University of Vienna. Eva's father was his parents' only child. During her own childhood Eva spent a lot of time with her paternal grandparents, enjoying access to her grandfather's book collection and able to listen to the "grown-up conversations" when there were guests. Gustav Kolmer, her grandfather, worked as a parliamentary correspondent with the Neue Freie Presse, one of Vienna's leading daily newspapers. Eva's mother, born Lili Erika Pereles (1887–1942), came from a family which had risen to moderate prosperity, owning a series of shoe factories, but she had many cousins and three elder siblings: she appears herself to have grown up in modest circumstances. While her children were small she worked during the afternoons as her husband's secretary. Later, on 17 August 1942, Lili Erika Kolmer was deported to the Maly Trostenets extermination camp near Minsk, and murdered there on 21 August.

The family was a musical one and Eva took piano lessons till she was twelve, after which other interests came to the fore. She grew up and attended the gymnasium (secondary school) in the Döbling quarter of Vienna, on the north side of the city, a short walk beyond the university. She passed her school final exams ("Abitur") in 1930. She was already actively interested in issues of social justice while still at school, and involved with the Young Communists. She remained in Vienna, now as a medical student, between 1931 and 1938, although her student career was not uninterrupted. She had already, when aged just seventeen, joined the Communist Party in September 1930. There are indications that in 1930, it was in order to demonstrate solidarity with the working class that she took a job in a light bulb factory, but she soon moved on, to work as a research assistant at the bacteriological institute of the Vienna University Institute for Experimental Pathology. Her father's death, from a heart attack in 1931, left her widowed mother with four children to support on a small pension, and from 1931, in parallel with her university studies, Kolmer was earning money by undertaking cancer research on behalf of the "Pearson Research Foundation" She had already produced her first piece of published research, an article entitled "A specific detection of cadmium" ("Ein spezifischer Nachweis des Cadmiums"), jointly with F.Pavelka, in 1930.

=== Student years ===
During her student years Kolmer, while still active as a Communist Party member, also participated in the activities of the Socialist Students Association ("Verband Sozialistischer StudentInnen Österreichs" / VSStÖ). The 1933 Nazi take-over in Germany had its counterpart in neighbouring Austria, where between 1932 and 1934 Chancellor Dolfuss systematically transformed the country into a one-party dictatorship. The Communist Party was outlawed in May 1933. Kolmer persisted with her political activism, however: she was arrested in August 1934 and held by the authorities for several months. Among her mother's wider family, the arrest drew attention to Eva's Communist activism, and she found herself marked out as something of a "black sheep". Her mother's elder sister, Marie, lived at this time in Berlin and was married to a director of "British Petrol". Relations between the sisters and their respective families were now severed. At the university she passed the exams for the first stage of her degree in 1935, but Prof. Freund, the head of the university institute at which she was studying, warned her not to persist with her political activities.

The Pearson foundation which was funding her research (and, indirectly, her university studies) sent Kolmer to work for a period in a Swiss cancer sanatorium. She was able to save some money from this work which funded further travel. However, after briefly backing away from her political activities she resumed "semi-legal work" on behalf of the party in Women's Associations and Consumer Co-operatives. She undertook her first trip to England at the end of 1935. In 1936 she began a clinical internship but also intensified her political activism. That led to a decline in her academic results. For the first time, she failed an exam, which led to another difficult conversation with Prof. Freund at the institute. It took place in the wake of a period working at the "London Hospital", which had been intended to create awareness for a cancer diagnosis method that Freund had developed: that exercise had not been a success. There was also conflict involving "Mr. Pearson" resulting from awareness of Kolmer's communist activities. The Pearson institute was the institute's principal funder. Prof. Freund told her that as an "incorrigible communist" she would have to abandon her course.

=== English exile ===
In March 1938 Austria was incorporated into Germany, creating a "Greater Germany", albeit under circumstances that those who had advocated the arrangement when German unification had risen up the agenda during the previous century could not have foreseen. On account both of her Jewish provenance and of her record of left-wing political activism, Kolmer could not expect an easy life in a state controlled by the Nazis. The Pearson foundation which had sponsored her research earlier in the decade was based in England, and her own travels had enabled her to establish further contacts in London. By now she had also mastered the English language. Following the advice of party comrades she emigrated, leaving Vienna on 16 March 1938 with a train ticket that took her to Zürich, from where she went on via Paris (where she encountered "passport problems"), arriving in London on 24 March 1938. She arrived, one of the first of a wave of political exiles from Austria, with a British pound in her handbag and, as she later wrote, no idea that she was not to set foot in her native land for another seven years. An "invitation letter" from an English friend had persuaded the authorities to let her into the country, and supported a three-month visitor's permit, but she had no long term visa and no permission to obtain work. The invitation letter had been provided by Wilson Harris, a prominent journalist and the editor of The Spectator whom she had met the previous year while visiting London on a journalistic assignment of her own, on behalf of the "Wiener Wirtschaftswoche". The Spectator's traditionalist conservatism reflected its editor's background, and it is hard to have seen that there can have been much meeting of minds between Kolmer and Harris on political matters. Harris was, as it turned out, one of several contacts in the English establishment whom she had been able to cultivate during her visits to London during the 1930s. Others included the Liberal politician, Geoffrey Mander who, like Wilson, took a particular interest in Austria, along with the formidable feminist campaigner Margery Corbett Ashby and the Duchess of Atholl, whom Kolmer later described as "highly prominent but completely mad".

In due course the administrative issues began to be resolved and she obtained laboratory work with her former sponsors at the Pearson Organisation. Fairly soon she was dropped by Pearson "on political grounds", however. She was able to stay with Margery Corbett Ashby for her first month in England. During this time she found time to produce a short report, describing the dramatic events of March 1938 in Austria. Wilson Harris provided an introduction to the London publisher, Michael Joseph: she published her account under the title "Austria Still Lives" in London in May 1938 under the pseudonym "Mitzi Hartmann". The fifty pounds she received for the little book enabled her to repay a debt and live on the balance for a short time. She also found casual secretarial and journalistic work. She was particularly appreciative of the learning opportunities provided by a stint working at "The Peckham Pioneer Healther Centre".

In September 1938 Kolmer was a co-founder, with Ruth Zerner, of the non-party-political "Council of Austrians in Great Britain" In March 1939 she was appointed general secretary of the "Austrian Centre" in London, an appointment which required her to obtain permission from the British Interior Ministry ("Home Office"), and for which she received a payment of two pounds per week. By this time, as more victims of race-based or political persecution attempted to gain admittance from central Europe to England she had, in the words of one source, "become well established in Austrian refugee relief work". In September 1939 the British government declared war on Germany, following the simultaneous invasion of Poland by Germany and the Soviet Union. It would take several more months before the war had a serious impact on most people's daily lives in London, and in the meantime, during the nervous months of uncertainty at the end of 1939, Eva Kolmer married Jakob Wolloch, a childhood friend who was now, like her an Austrian refugee from political persecution, living in London.

One practical step the government could take on the home front, as it waited to find out what war would involve, was to dust down a regulation providing for the arrest and detention of enemy aliens. While the armies of Germany and the Soviet Union concentrated on the carve up of Poland, the significance of this remained unclear, but once France was invaded, in May 1940, the British government decided that thousands of people who had fled from the Nazis during the previous few years because they were persecuted on account of their Jewishness and/or their political activities, represented a threat. Mass arrests took place. Eva Kolmer, well connected with the British establishment, found herself classified as "an official of a refugee organisation", and so she was not interned. She was indeed permitted to visit Austrian internees in the camps to which they had been consigned by the British authorities. Jakob Wolloch, her new husband, was not so lucky and she was obliged to lobby extensively to try and hasten his release, at the same time using all her contacts to lobby more widely against the policy of arresting political refugees. Sources are silent about the effectiveness of her campaigning on her husband's behalf. Within a year or two the British government had changed its mind about the problem of the enemy aliens, and most were quietly released, The Wolloch marriage quickly broke apart, ending in divorce. The British security services were aware of Eva Wolloch's political sympathies and aware of concerns within the political establishment that known communists among the German and Austrian refugees might make common cause with Britain's home-grown communists, to the detriment of British interests. They certainly took a close interest in her activities while she was in England, although the practical impact on her of British security services' attentions is not clear.

As the war progressed Eva Wolloch was associated with a number of groups and activities, including many that involved with fellow members of the Austrian Communist Party, though it is hard to determine whether this was part of a communist conspiracy, or simply a matter of political refugees from Nazism doing what they could in opposition to a shared enemy. In or before 1941 she was a co-founder of the "Free Austrian movement" which operated in close concert with the "Austrian Centre" and almost certainly had links to the Soviet Union. However, there are suggestions that exiled Austrian communists played down their communist connections in order to avoid antagonising the British authorities and to work with the may Austrian refugees who had been persecuted for reasons of race, and who would have been horrified to be associated with communists.

=== Heinz Schmidt ===
From around 1941 Eva Wolloch was living in London with the German journalist (and communist) Heinz Schmidt. War ended in May 1945, with both Austria and the western two thirds of Germany under allied military occupation. The allies had already agreed in 1943 that in political terms Austria should not remain integrated into a larger Germany state. In the early part of 1946 Heinz Schmidt returned to the part of Germany now administered as the Soviet occupation zone By this time Eva Wolloch had already returned to Vienna, where she had been selected to become secretary of the communist faction in the lower house of a restored National Council (parliament). There existed a complementary (or alternative) possibility of formally completing her medical studies and working as a doctor. It is not without irony that the promising political career set out before her in occupied Austria was trumped by her love for a man. After much agonising, and following discussion with the Austrian party leaders Johann Koplenig and Friedl Fürnberg, she would end up moving to the Soviet occupation zone in Germany in order to rejoin Schmidt. There was no possibility in occupied post-war Europe of moving directly from Vienna to Berlin, and by 17 February 1946 she was back in London. That was the date on which she wrote to Viktor Matejka, who was taking a lead from the political left in re-establishing a democratic political structure in Vienna: "My future is still very uncertain, but I will in any case spend a few more weeks here in England".

In the end she found herself staying in England till August 1946, although once it became clear that she had decided not to build her future in Austria she lost much of her leadership role and political influence with the Austrian refugee community, many of whom were impatient to be able to return home. She applied at least some her energies to contributing newspaper articles and lecturing on her experiences of Vienna. She also compiled a booklet of memoirs on the "Austrian Centre" and her work with the Austrian expatriate community during seven years of enforced exile in London.

=== Soviet occupation zone ===
When she joined Heinz Schmidt in the Soviet occupation zone in the late summer of 1946, Eva Kolmer also became a member of the recently formed Socialist Unity Party ("Sozialistische Einheitspartei Deutschlands" / SED). A united party of the left, formed out of the conviction that back in 1933 the Nazi Party had been able to take power because of divisions of the political left, the SED soon became the ruling party in a new kind of German one-party dictatorship. Eva's medical qualifications were retrospectively conferred, respecting the unusual circumstances which had made it impossible for her to take her final medical exams before she fled Vienna in 1938. In 1947 Eva Wolloch and Heinz Schmidt were married. Their daughter Renate was born at the end of that year. Their son Walter was born in May 1950.

While Heinz Schmidt took a top job with the Berliner Rundfunk (radio station), Eva Schmidt-Kolmer (as she now became) took a position as head of the statistics and information department at the National Administration (in the Soviet zone) for Health Care. In this role she was instrumental in drafting the law on the care of mothers and children ("Gesetz über den Mutter- und Kinderschutz") which, following the relaunch of the Soviet zone as the Soviet sponsored German Democratic Republic (East Germany) in October 1949, became, in September 1950, one of the first laws to be ratified by the country's new parliament ("Volkskammer"). In 1948, based in Berlin, she became national secretary of the Democratic Women's League (" Demokratischer Frauenbund Deutschlands" / DFD), of which she was, according to at least one source, a co-founder.

In March 1948 Eva Schmidt-Kolmer was one of 400 delegates to the People's Council ("Deutscher Volksrat") which convened in the Soviet part of Berlin, mandated to draw up a constitution, based on a draft created two years earlier by The Party. She was also a member of the Provisional Parliament ("Provisorische Volkskammer") which met in October 1949 with instructions to implement that constitution. By this time she sat not as an SED member but as a member for the DFD which, in addition to its other functions, was one of the mass movements that received a (fixed) allocation of seats in the legislature. Although seat allocation was controlled by the ruling party, the inclusion of other "parties" and non-parties in the legislature was intended to provide for a more inclusive political power structure. Critics saw this as a largely cosmetic device.

=== German Democratic Republic ===
Many political refugees who had headed for Moscow to escape the Nazis in the 1930s had ended up in internal exile, and would still have months or years to wait at the end of the war before they would be able to leave the Soviet Union. However, there was one group of 30 men who had spent the war years in Moscow and who remained on good terms with the Soviet leadership. These men were flown back to Berlin by the Soviets, under conditions of great secrecy, on 30 April 1945, a week before the formal end of the war. Much later these men came to be known as the Ulbricht Group, and during the decade 1945/55 it turned out that they had arrived with a very detailed plan for the future of Germany. After a series of confrontations in 1949 it became clear that the United States and its allies could and would block the extension of the group's nation building programme across the western part of Germany. Nevertheless, within the area administered, till 1949, as the Soviet occupation zone, by the time the German Democratic Republic was founded, the entire region had been established, in its basic essentials, as a Soviet-style one-party "communist" state. As Cold War tensions intensified, the East German leaders who had spent the war in Moscow grew increasingly mistrustful of those comrades who had not. The most high-profile victim of this development was probably Paul Merker, but there were others lower down in the power structure who also found themselves branded as "Westemigranten" ("Western emigrants") as Walter Ulbricht, backed by his immediate circle sought to consolidate their power base. On 20 October 1949 the Politburo removed Heinz Schmidt from his post at Berlin Radio, citing his "nationalistic arrogance" and "insufficient political vigilance" ("nationalistischer Überheblichkeit [und] ungenügender politischer Wachsamkeit"). Between 1950 and 1955 he was retained on the books at Berlin Radio under a "provisional contract" in the production department. What actually happened was that he was relocated to Schwerin in the extreme north of the country, accompanied by his wife. In Schwerin Heinz was employed in a relatively low-grade position as head of the Arts and Culture section at the Regional Headquarters of the Machine and tractor station. (Agricultural land had been taken over by the state, but tractors and other farm equipment were separately acquired, maintained and allocated as required, so that the Machine and tractor stations, became vital strategic elements in the rural economy of East Germany, just as they already were in the Soviet Union.) Eva gave birth to the couple's son in May 1950. Following that she was employed as a section leader in the regional head office of a trade organisation. However, in 1951 she was given a job much closer to her heart, as head of the Mother and Child Health Protection Department at the Ministry for Health Care office covering Mecklenburg. Her talent for extreme multi-tasking was again on display during her time in Mecklenburg, as Eva Schmidt-Kolmer combined her day job with a programme of intensive research on themes involving child health and protection. On 11 July 1952 she received her doctorate: her dissertation was entitled "Health protection for mother and child" ("Gesundheitsschutz für Mutter und Kind").

The physical/psychological development of children during their first three years lay at the heart of [Schmidt-Kolmer's] academic research. This led her to certain conclusions:

- The more they are isolated from their families and the wider social sphere, the more the physical and psychiatric development of children is adversely affected.
- The more harmonious the care they receive from families and daycare institutions, the more their development and health parameters of children are improved.
- The success of the adaptation process for children transferring to institutional care is dependent on various factors: the age of the children, their medical histories, maturity and the nature and responsiveness of the care provided following the acceptance of the child into the childcare institution.

* die physisch-psychische Entwicklung der Kinder umso ungünstiger verläuft, desto größer ihre Isolation von Familie und gesellschaftlicher Umwelt ist;
* die Entwicklungs- und Gesundheitsparameter der Kinder umso günstiger ausfallen, desto harmonischer ihre Betreuung in den Familien und Tageseinrichtungen verläuft;
* die Adaptionsprozesse der Kinder beim Übergang in eine Kindereinrichtung von verschiedenen Faktoren abhängig sind: vom Alter der Kinder, von der medizinischen Anamnese, vom Entwicklungsstand, von der Art der außerfamiliären Betreuung und Gestaltung der Anpassungsperiode nach Aufnahme des Kindes in die Kindereinrichtung.

G. Niebsch, Ch. Grosch, U. Boßdorf, G. Graehn-Baumann: Gesundheit, Entwicklung und Erziehung in der frühen Kindheit: Wissenschaft und Praxis der Kinderbetreuung in der DDR. Der Anteil Eva Schmidt-Kolmers an der Konzipierung und Realisierung.

Schmidt-Kolmer and her husband were evidently rehabilitated in 1954. They relocated again, this time to Leipzig, home of the prestigious Karl-Marx University (as it was then known). In Leipzig Heinz Schmidt became editor in chief of, Das Magazin. while his wife undertook a specialist medical training in social psychology ("Sozialhygiene") at the University Medical Faculty. She had already, in 1953, accepted an invitation to head up a working group on infant and toddler hygiene under the auspices of the East German Social Psychology Study Group ("Arbeitsgemeinschaft der Sozialhygieniker in der DDR"). This gave her the opportunity to study research from the Anglo-Saxon world, notably by John Bowlby and James Robertson, including their then pioneering work on attachment theory, key parts of which were translated and published in the East German medical literature. Over the next few years there were a number of comparative studies undertaken in East Germany to compare the outcomes for children brought up within a family and those who grew up in institutions. The studies always revealed substantial developmental disadvantages for the institutionalised children, while children who grew up in a family environment consistently displayed the better outcomes. Schmidt-Kolmer was involved in extensive discussion and testing of different approaches that might be used to narrow or eliminate the gap, such as step-by-step familiarization in place of sudden institutionalisation, personal toys, mixed age grouping, avoidance of frequent personnel changes among care staff and promotion of contact with birth families.

In 1956 the couple were allowed to return to Berlin. Armed with her doctorate, on 1 July 1956 Schmidt-Kolmer joined the social psychology ("Sozialhygiene") department of the Medical Faculty at the Humboldt University, initially as a senior assistant, mandated by her new boss, Prof.Kuert Winter, to develop her expertise in the field of social psychology. She received her habilitation (higher academic qualification) in 1957 or 1958 for work on childhood development during the first three years of life. The qualification opened the way to a long-term academic career, and she accepted a teaching chair in her chosen speciality. A full professorship quickly followed. According to at least one source, as a university teacher she in effect founded the discipline of "Childhood and youth social hygiene" ("Hygiene des Kindes- und Jugendalters"), which she then promoted and developed through her research and teaching.

In 1959 Schmidt-Kolmer conducted in the northern town of Güstrow what was described as the first large scale comparison research project between children growing up (1)in families, (2)with daycare centres, (3)with working-weekly child care centres and (4)in long-term care using children's homes. That same year she was appointed to head up the "Department for [Social] Hygiene in childhood" ("Abteilung für Hygiene des Kindesalters") at the Berlin University Institute for Social Hygiene. However, after the imposition of the Berlin Wall in August 1961, the results of her research studies ceased to be published, and independent research teams in Halle, Leipzig and Berlin were disbanded. There was no further discussion of attachment theory. Ideas about reforming child rearing outside the family were left to wither and then disappeared from the East German public agenda.

Schmidt-Kolmer served between 1966 and 1974 as director of the "National Institute for [Social] Hygiene during childhood and adolescence" (" Zentralinstituts für Hygiene des Kindes- und Jugendalters Berlin der DDR"). She chose the name of the institute herself, intending to emphasize the interdisciplinary nature of the administrative and academic responsibilities for health protection throughout childhood and adolescence ("um die Interdisziplinarität der administrativen und wissenschaftlichen Aufgaben des Gesundheitsschutzes für das gesamte Kindes- und Jugendalter deutlich zu machen"). This centrally directed institute was given the task of creating a mandatory education programme for all the childcare facilities in the country. Eva Schmidt-Kolmer never left anyone in any doubt about the closeness of her own involvement in this till the day she retired, and indeed she remained closely in touch with the institute till it was closed down, in the context of reunification, in 1990.

On the basis of her research, Schmidt-Kolmer pleaded for the systematic creation and expansion of day nurseries. Under her leadership, between 1971 and 1973 six thousand children in daycare centres were closely monitored during their first three years. Motor skills, game activity, language and social skills were observed and measured using test procedures. They showed that the more time parents spend with their children, the better the children develop. Especially during the first two years, the overall mental development of the child depends on joint activity with the parents.

=== Retirement and death ===
After she retired she remained active, producing various papers and books and serving on a number of committees. At the end of her life Eva Schmidt-Kolmer became seriously ill with cancer. She died in Berlin on 29 August 1991.

== Awards and honours ==
- 1963 Patriotic Order of Merit in Silver
- 1963 Star of People's Friendship 1st class ("Großer Stern der Völkerfreundschaft in Gold")
- 1973 Banner of Labour
- 1983 Patriotic Order of Merit gold clasp
