= Heinz Schmidt =

German journalist and editor (1906–1989)

- Born: Heinz Heinrich Schmidt; 26 November 1906; Halle, Province of Saxony, Kingdom of Prussia, Germany
- Died: 14 September 1989 (aged 82); East Berlin, East Germany (now Berlin, Germany)
- Occupations: journalist newspaper/magazine editor
- Political party: SPD; KPD; SED
- Spouse: Eva Schmidt-Kolmer (1913–1991)

Heinz Heinrich Schmidt (26 November 1906 – 14 September 1989) was a German journalist and editor. During the twelve Nazi years he was involved in active resistance, spending approximately three years in prison and a further seven years as a political refugee in London.

== Life ==
Schmidt was born into a working-class family in Halle. He attended school locally and trained for work as a miner.

After briefly working in the mines, in 1926 he joined the [[Social Democratic Party of Germany|Social Democratic Party ("Sozialdemokratische Partei Deutschlands" / SPD)]], and was recruited to edit various party newspapers. Between 1930 and 1933 he undertook a period of further study in Halle, covering constitutional and civil law. During that period of study, in 1931, he joined the Communist Party.

In January 1933, the Nazi Party took power and lost no time in transforming Germany into a one-party dictatorship. After the Reichstag fire in February 1933 communists found themselves identified as enemies of the state. Schmidt continued with his party activism which was now illegal. He was arrested in 1934 and served his three year sentence in the Brandenburg-Görden super jail and as an inmate at the Lichtenburg concentration camp. Released in 1937 he escaped to Prague, emigrating from there to London, where he arrived in or before 1938. In London, he would have been identified as an enemy alien and incarcerated for a time, but he was also able to join the local branch of the exiled German communist party, becoming leader of the little group in 1941. Two years later, in 1943, using the pseudonym "Jack Morrell", he became editor-in-chief of the "Freie Tribüne", a London-based newspaper published by and for the exiled German communists who had fetched up in Britain. He continued to serve in this capacity till war ended in the early summer of 1945.

When he returned to Germany in 1946, it was to his home region which was part of a large chunk of what had been central Germany that by now was being administered as the Soviet occupation zone. The region was being subjected to a carefully planned Soviet sponsored nation building exercise headed up by an elite team of German communists who, in contrast to the treatment afforded to others who had fled to the Soviet Union, had been flown in from Moscow at the end of April 1945. Most of the communists who had fled Nazi Germany and survived the experience had spent the war years in Moscow. Smaller groups had lived in western capitals including London, but many of these did not return to Germany after the war, or at least not to the Soviet occupation zone. Those, such as Heinz Schmidt, that did were branded as "Westemigranten" ("Western emigrants") and viewed with a certain amount of suspicion by the men who after 1949 would form the backbone of the East German political establishment: there was a concern, shared by Stalin himself, that living in the west might have corrupted or diminished their credentials as loyal pro-Soviet comrades. However, Schmidt lost no time in signing his party membership over to the newly formed Socialist Unity Party ("Sozialistische Einheitspartei Deutschlands" / SED) and took a job with the party, serving briefly in a senior capacity in the party's information department ("Leiter der Hauptabteilung Tagesfragen sowie als Chefredakteur"). That lasted till 31 July 1947 when he took over from Max Seydewitz as Intendant (loosely: "director general") of the Berliner Rundfunk (radio channel).

October 1949 was the month in which the Soviet occupation zone was relaunched as the Soviet sponsored German Democratic Republic (East Germany). A more personal change of direction for Heinz Schmidt came on 20 October 1949 when the Politburo removed him from his post at Berlin Radio, citing his "nationalistic arrogance" and "insufficient political vigilance" ("nationalistischer Überheblichkeit [und] ungenügender politischer Wachsamkeit"). Between 1950 and 1955 he was employed on a "provisional contract" in the production department. In 1955/56 he was appointed editor in chief on Das Magazin, a recently launched arts and lifestyle magazine. In 1956, he was switched to the same position on the satirical magazine Eulenspiegel. However, in 1958, he was removed from that post.

He was now installed as head of the press department at the National Council of the National Front, which was a political structure used by the ruling SED (party) to control the other political parties. He had already, in 1957, been appointed a member of the presidium and secretary of the National Front. In 1964 he was given the honorary presidency of the country's Afro-Asian solidarity committee, a position in which he continued to serve till 19 November 1976. That was when, on health grounds, he was replaced in the role by Kurt Seibt.

== Personal ==
In his personal life, by August 1946, when the two of them moved together to Berlin, Heinz Schmidt had teamed up with the pioneering physician Eva Schmidt-Kolmer. They married in 1947. The marriage produced two children.

Heinz Heinrich Schmidt died in East Berlin on 14 September 1989 aged 82.

== Awards and honours ==
- 1962 Patriotic Order of Merit in silver
- 1971 Patriotic Order of Merit in gold
- 1976 Order of Karl Marx
- 1981 Star of People's Friendship in Gold
- 1986 Patriotic Order of Merit gold clasp
