= Walter Halbritter =

German politician (1927–2003)

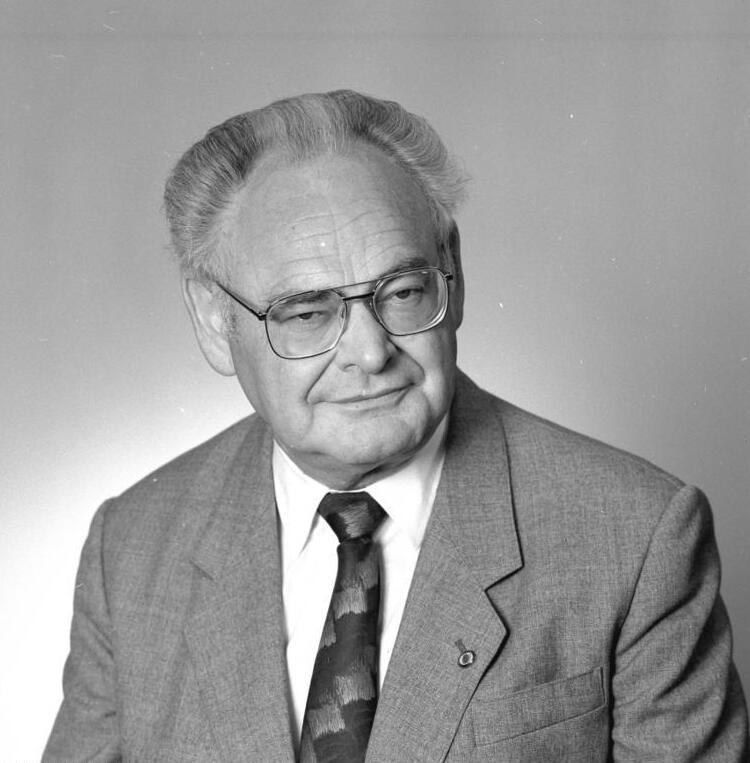
- Halbritter in 1989

Minister and Head of the Office for Prices
- In office 22 December 1965 – 18 November 1989
- Chairman of the Council of Ministers: Willi Stoph; Horst Sindermann; Willi Stoph
- Preceded by: Position established
- Succeeded by: Position abolished
Volkskammer
Member of the Volkskammer for Bitterfeld, Gräfenhainichen, Wittenberg
In office 14 July 1967 – 29 January 1990
| Preceded by | multi-member district |
| Succeeded by | Constituency abolished |

Personal details
- Born: Walter Halbritter; 17 November 1927 Hoym, Free State of Anhalt, Weimar Republic (now Saxony-Anhalt, Germany)
- Died: 11 April 2003 (aged 75) Seelow, Brandenburg, Germany
- Party: Socialist Unity Party (1949–1989)
- Education: Deutsche Verwaltungsakademie; Humboldt University of Berlin; Hochschule für Ökonomie Berlin
- Occupation: Politician; Civil Servant
- Awards: Banner of Labor; Patriotic Order of Merit, 1st class
- Central institution membership: 1967–1973: Candidate member, Politburo of the Central Committee; 1967–1989: Full member, Central Committee; Other offices held: 1963–1965: Deputy Chairman, State Planning Commission; 1961–1963: Deputy Minister, Ministry of Finance

Walter Halbritter (17 November 1927 – 11 April 2003) was a German civil servant, politician and party functionary of the Socialist Unity Party (SED).

In the German Democratic Republic, he served as the longtime head of the Office for Prices at the Council of Ministers of the GDR and was a member of the Central Committee of the SED. Additionally, from 1967 to October 1973, he was a candidate member of the Politburo of the Central Committee of the SED.

== Life and career ==
Born into a family of agricultural workers on 17 November 1927, in Hoym, Halbritter attended primary school from 1934 to 1942 and underwent administrative training from 1942 to 1944. In 1944, he was conscripted into the Wehrmacht and spent time as prisoner of war in British captivity from May to December 1945.

Upon his return, he worked as a farm laborer and joined the ruling Socialist Unity Party (SED) in 1946, and the Free German Youth (FDJ) in 1948. He worked at the Ballenstedt district administration until 1951, afterwards studying at the German Administrative Academy in Forst Zinna, de facto a cadre factory of the SED, until 1954. He subsequently served as head of the Budget Department of the GDR's Ministry of Finance.

From 1952 to 1957, he pursued distance learning at the Humboldt University and University of Economics in Berlin, earning a degree in economics. Starting from 1954, he worked as a staff member in the Central Committee of the SED, eventually serving as deputy head of its Planning, Finance, and Technical Development Department from 1960 to 1961.

== Political career ==
=== Minister ===
From 1961 to 1963, he was deputy finance minister, then served as deputy chair of the State Planning Commission and chair of the Committee for Labor and Wages until 1965. From December 1965 to November 1989, he was the first and only head of the newly established Office for Prices at the Council of Ministers of the GDR, holding ministerial rank. Additionally, from November 1967 to 1989, he was a member of the Presidium of the Council of Ministers.

Halbritter's office compared consumer prices, for example for basic foods or energy, in the GDR with those in other countries. According to the government's ideas, these were then also established for the internal market. The problem here was that the Price Office, as an intermediate steering body, decoupled the connection between the producers' production costs and the purchasing power of consumers. This led to chaotic conditions, especially in areas where prices had been heavily subsidized and frozen by the state for several decades, for example for food, drinking water, utilities such as electricity and gas, tradesmen's services or fees for public transport, because households did not were more encouraged to consume or consume according to their own possibilities. This resulted in excess demand, which in a market economy would result in a price premium. However, since consumer prices were fixed by the state, this often led to a waste of resources. For example, basic foods were thoughtlessly fed to small animals and the energy provided was used carelessly.

Halbritter was awarded the Banner of Labor in 1963 and 1969, the Patriotic Order of Merit in 1977 and 1987 (honor clasp), and the Martial Order “For Services to the People and Fatherland” in 1984.

=== SED Central Committee ===
From April 1967 (VII. Party Congress) until its collective resignation in December 1989, he was a full member of the Central Committee of the SED. He additionally became member of the Volkskammer in 1967. He was also elected to the Politburo of the Central Committee of the SED, the de facto highest leadership body in East Germany, as a candidate member, but was not reelected in October 1973, when Erich Honecker instituted a major reshuffle of the Politburo following Walter Ulbricht's death.

=== Peaceful Revolution ===
During the Wende, from December 1989 to February 1990, he served as Representative of the Chairman of the Council of Ministers for the Central Round Table and for the dissolution of the Office for National Security in the Modrow government, with the rank of state secretary.

In this role, he was tasked with preparing talks at the Central Round Table, as well as serving as a liaison to the Office for National Security and the Dissolution Committee of the Ministry for State Security.

=== Death ===
Halbritter died in 2003 at the age of 75. He was buried in the cemetery in Seelow.
