= Helmut Kirchberg =

German mining scientist

- Born: January 31, 1906; Mainz, Hesse-Darmstadt, German Empire
- Died: 23 May 1983 (aged 77); Freiberg, East Germany
- Occupations: Mining scientist; University rector

Helmut Kirchberg (31 January 1906 – 23 May 1983) was a German mining scientist. In 1953 he was appointed Rector of the Freiberg University of Mining and Technology.

== Life ==
Kirchberg was born in Mainz in the first decade of the twentieth century. His father was a School Rector. In 1915 the young Kirchberg entered the Gymnasium Zum Kloster Unser Lieben Frauen, a secondary school with a Christian and academic focus in Magdeburg. He passed his School Final Exams in 1924.

He went on to study mining at Freiberg, Aachen and Berlin, emerging in 1929 with an engineering degree. He stayed on at the Technische Hochschule in Charlottenburg (now Technische Universität Berlin) where he held a succession of junior academic post, and from where he received his doctorate in 1937 for work on "The processing of minerals according to their Thermal Properties" Between 1938 and 1943 he worked as a senior scientific research assistant at the Kaiser William Institute for Iron Research (as it was known at the time) in Düsseldorf. At the end of this period, in March 1943 he obtained his habilitation from the Technische Hochschule Aachen with a dissertation entitled "Steel frame Building Construction and its Impact on Adding Value" After this, starting in 1943, he worked as a Professor of Mining at the Technische Hochschule Breslau.

War had resumed in September 1939 following a Nazi-Soviet Non-aggression pact that opened the way for a repeat partition of Poland between the two dictatorships. War ended in May 1945. By then Breslau had been besieged by the Red army for three months, before being surrendered on 6 May 1945. By that time in Breslau, along with the surrounding Silesian territories, a programme of wholesale ethnic cleansing was underway. At end of 1946 Breslau had become Wrocław and the ethnic German population had been replaced by an ethnic Polish population, many of those involved having themselves been expelled from territories in the east of Poland annexed by the Soviet Union. Helmut Kirchberg was expelled to the west, ending up in the Soviet occupation zone of what had previously been Germany. By 1946 he was working as an interpreter in the Central Administration for the Fuels industry.

Published output
not a complete list
- Die Aufbereitung von Mineralien auf Grund ihrer Wärmeeigenschaften, TH Berlin, Diss., (1937)
- Zur begrifflichen und formelmäßigen Erfassung von Siebvorgängen (1952)
- Aufbereitung bergbaulicher Rohstoffe (vol. 1, 1953)
- Die Flotation nichtsulfidischer Minerale mit Tallölprodukten als Sammler (1963)
- Beiträge zur Flotation und Dichtesortierung (1968)
- Probleme der Zinnsteinflotation und der Zinnbestimmung (1969)

Between 1947 and 1954 he held a teaching professorship at the Freiberg Mining Academy, becoming dean of the Faculty of Mining and Metallurgy in 1948. In 1953 he was appointed Rector of the Mining Academy, in succession to Friedrich Leutwein. He held the post till 1955. In the meantime, formally in October 1949, the Soviet occupation zone was replaced by the Soviet sponsored German Democratic Republic, of which Kirchberg was now a citizen. While rector, he was instrumental in the creation of the Academy's "Research Institute for Preparation" ("Forschungsinstituts für Aufbereitung"), which many regarded as his crowning achievement and which he himself headed up for almost eighteen years until his retirement in 1971.

In 1957 Kirchberg became a full member of the (East) German Academy of Sciences, having been made a corresponding member the previous year. He was honoured in 1959 with the Patriotic Order of Merit in silver, and in 1969 received the Banner of Labor.

Kirchberg died in Freiberg in May 1983.
