= Emmi Handke =

German communist politician (1902–1994)

Emmi/Emmy Handke
- Born: Emmi Christoph; 30 September 1902; Breslau, Province of Silesia, Germany
- Died: 17 January 1994 (aged 91); Berlin, Germany
- Occupations: Communist activist Concentration camp internee "Komitee der Ravensbrücker" General Secretary
- Spouse(s): 1. Karl Thoma 1928; 2. Georg Handke 1947

Emmi Handke (born Emmi Christoph; 30 September 1902 – 17 January 1994) was a German Communist party activist.

She spent most of the twelve Nazi years in state detention, arrested in 1934 after her "political work" became illegal. Following the war she worked on the Committee of Ravensbrück Concentration Camp survivors ("Komitee der Ravensbrücker"), later serving for many years as the General Secretary of the International Ravensbrück Concentration Camp Committee.

She worked with the powerful Party Central Committee of the German Democratic Republic (East Germany) though she was never herself a member of it. She was, however, a member of the East German national parliament ("Volkskammer") between 1958 and 1986.

== Life ==
Emmi Christoph was born into a working-class family in Breslau. Together with her eight siblings she grew up as an orphan with an aunt in Dresden. She would later describe the aunt as "good and full of love" ("Gut und voller Liebe"). After completing her schooling she went on to undertake a training between 1918 and 1920 in commerce, before taking an office job.

She joined the Young Communists in 1922: shortly after this she was arrested for the first time. The period was one of enduring economic, social and political crisis and for several weeks starting in November 1923 the party in Germany had been banned: her arrest resulted from her having spent an evening doing some party related typing for a comrade. In 1925 she joined the Communist Party itself, and took a job working for the Party Central Committee which she would retain till 1934. It was in this connection that in 1927 she was a member of a party delegation to the Soviet Union. Another delegate was Karl Thoma whom she married, moving to live with him in Berlin in 1928. (Note: Karl Thoma is sometimes identified in sources as "Ewald Blau", which became his Communist "party name" in March 1920.)

Régime change arrived in January 1933 and the new government lost little time in imposing one-party dictatorship, one effect of which was to make political activity (except in support of the Nazi party) illegal. Emmi's husband was one of a large number of left-wing activists arrested in the aftermath of the Reichstag fire of 27 February 1933. She herself was arrested later in 1933 for "illegal party-political activity", and in 1934 sentenced to six years in prison for "preparing high treason" ("Vorbereitung zum Hochverrat"). She would never see her husband again: he was released after a few years and died at the start of 1939, fighting in the Spanish Civil War. She spent her own six-year sentence at a Correctional Institution in Jauer.

By 1941 the country was at war, and Emmi Thomas was transferred directly from the correctional institution to Ravensbrück concentration camp where fellow inmates recruited her to work in the infirmary. It was probably in 1942 that she was transferred to Auschwitz, where she again undertook nursing work. In 1943, on the recommendation of a Camp supervisor, and backed by the personal authorisation of the SS chief, Heinrich Himmler, she was one of five internees released from the concentration camp. The release was conditional, however, on working as a domestic servant at the home of the concentration camp doctor, the Baron von Bodmann.

She worked as a servant at the home of von Bodmann till May 1945 when war ended, her employer killed himself, and Emmi Thoma returned home to Berlin. The part of Germany surrounding Berlin now found itself administered as the Soviet occupation zone. Between 1945 and 1956 she worked for the Party Executive ("Partei Vorstand") which in due course became the Central Committee of the Socialist Unity Party (Sozialistische Einheitspartei Deutschlands / SED). The SED itself was founded in April 1946 as a more broadly based replacement, at least within the Soviet occupation zone, for the Communist Party. She was employed in the Central Committee's "Resistance Department". The resistance in question was the resistance between 1933 and 1945 to the Nazi regime: her work focused on locating concentration camp survivors and persuading them to write down their experiences. The objective was to preserve the memory of Nazi war crimes against comrades so as to inform future generations.

It was in the course of her work for the Central Committee that Emmi Thoma came across Georg Handke whom she had last seen in September 1934 when the two of them were among those arrested for participating in an illegal political meeting. The two were married in 1947, united in their a commitment to building up what was relaunched, in October 1949, as the German Democratic Republic (East Germany). Emmi Handke resigned from her Central Committee work in 1956 in order to devote herself to her voluntary work, which continued to be focused on Concentration Camp survivors both within East Germany and internationally.

Although her work for the Central Committee was not combined with any political office, in 1947 Emmi Handke became the first spokesperson for the "Ravensbrück Camp Community" ("Lagergemeinschaft Ravensbrück"). The next year she became a member of the secretariat of the Berlin branch of the Democratic Women's League ("Demokratischer Frauenbund Deutschlands" / DFD). She was also, briefly, a member of the supervisory board of the Berlin Consumer Co-operative. During the Nazi years the Ravensbrück concentration camp had contained more female inmates than any of the other concentration camps in Germany, and the political establishment in the new East German state, always keen to highlight the contrast between the brutality of the Nazi dictatorship with their own political approach, during the 1950s developed the concentration camp site into a memorial and exhibition of the horrors it had witnessed. In 1955 Emmi Handke became vice-president of the International Ravensbrück Concentration Camp Committee, a role which she filled actively till 1993, voted in as general secretary of the Concentration Camp Committee in 1963, while also remaining energetic in her commitment to the DFD.

In 1958 Emmi Handke was elected to the East German national parliament ("Volkskammer"). Under the single list voting system in operation, the ruling party's list of candidates was endorsed, as usual, by more than 99% of those voting. Nevertheless, the system imposed one-party rule not by banning alternative political parties but by controlling them. Seats in the legislature were allocated after general elections according to a predetermined quota to candidates acceptable to the ruling party. In order to broaden further the legitimacy of the legislature, smaller quotas of seats in it were also allocated to certain approved Mass organisations. Emmi Handke herself entered the Volkskammer not as a member of the ruling SED party. nor of any other Bloc party, but as one of 29 members representing the DFD. The last election at which she was returned to the Volkskammer took place in 1981. The number of members had grown from 466 to 500, and the number of seats allocated to the DFD was now 35: Emmy Handke occupied one of them. Until her husband's death in 1962 she was one of a husband and wife team in the chamber, since Georg Handke was also a Volkskammer member.

== Awards and honours ==
- 1955 Patriotic Order of Merit in bronze
- 1959 Clara Zetkin Medal
- 1962 Patriotic Order of Merit in silver
- 1967 Patriotic Order of Merit in gold
- 1972 Patriotic Order of Merit gold clasp
- 1977 Order of Karl Marx
- 1982 Star of People's Friendship in silver
- 1987 Star of People's Friendship in gold
