= Albert Hensel =

Executed German Communist (1895–1942)

Albert Hensel (March 20, 1895 – June 5, 1942) was a German Communist executed under the Nazis. He was a member of the Communist Party of Germany and was among the numerous other resistance fighters executed by the Nazis. Hensel was born in Dresden where he and fellow communist members began their work against the Nazi regime.

== The Resistance ==
The Dresden activists represented a small minority of the KPD included, Wilhelm Firl (journalist), Herbert Bochow (writer), Otto Gale (cobbler), Franz Hoffman, Kurt Schlosser, and Herbert Blcohwitz (carpenters), Arno Lade (team conductor), Franz Latzel (metal worker), Hans Rothbarth (textile worker), and Hans Daukner (Jewish Gardner).

== Plotzensee Prison ==
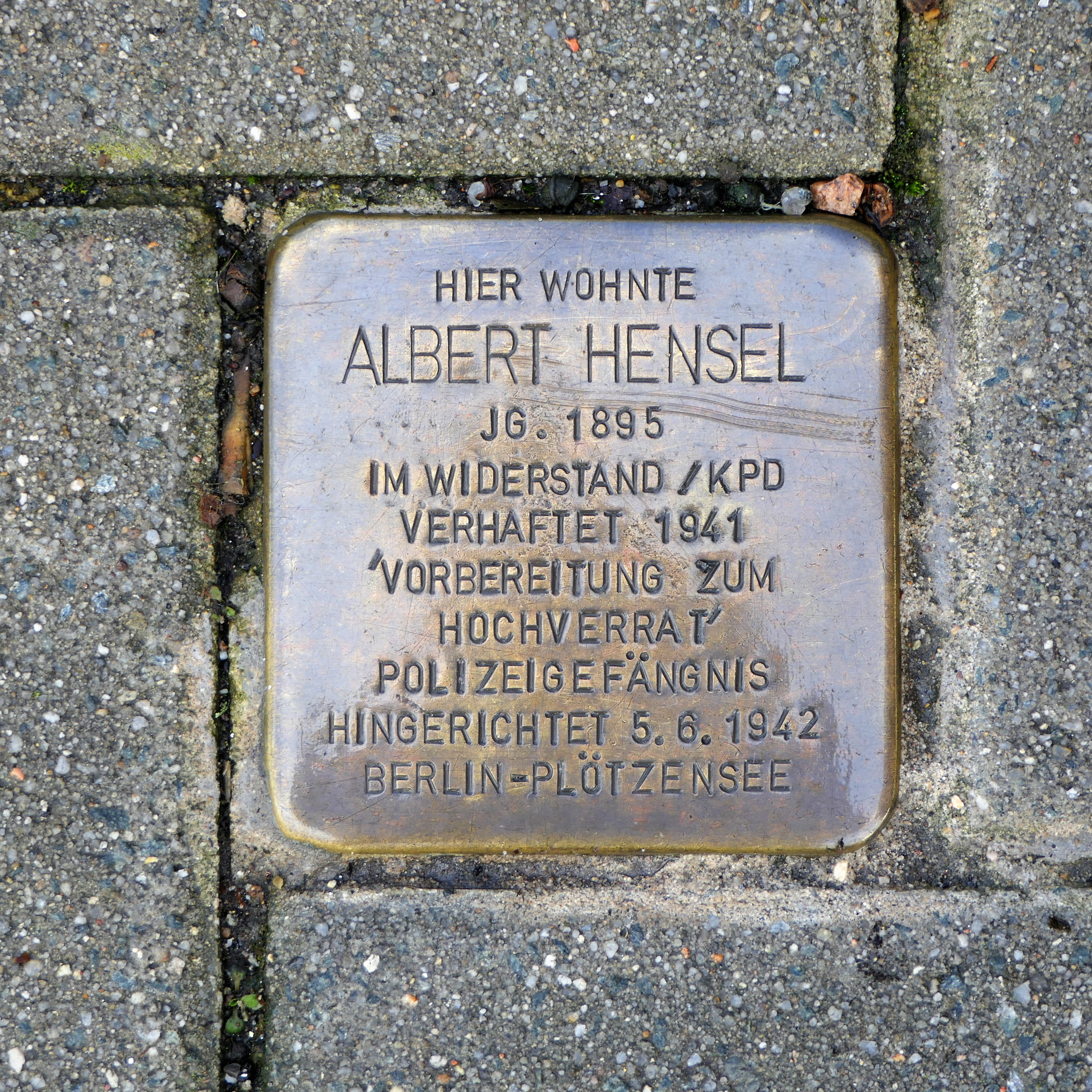
Memorial plaque of Albert Hensel in Dresden

Hensel was one of over 2500 executions that took place at Plotzensee Prison. He was arrested on February 6, 1941, and remained in custody at Plotzensee for over fourteen months. Hensel was executed on June 5, 1942, at Plotzensee Prison in Berlin after being tried and convicted by the Volksgerichtshof. Hensel was executed by either hanging or beheading on June 5, 1942. The cottage where the executions took place is still standing.

Plotzensee is still operating in Germany. After World War II, the prison was used to house juvenile delinquents until 1987 when the juveniles were housed in a newly built facility nearby. After the juveniles were moved, the prison has been used as a men’s prison which still remains in operation.
