= Deba Wieland =

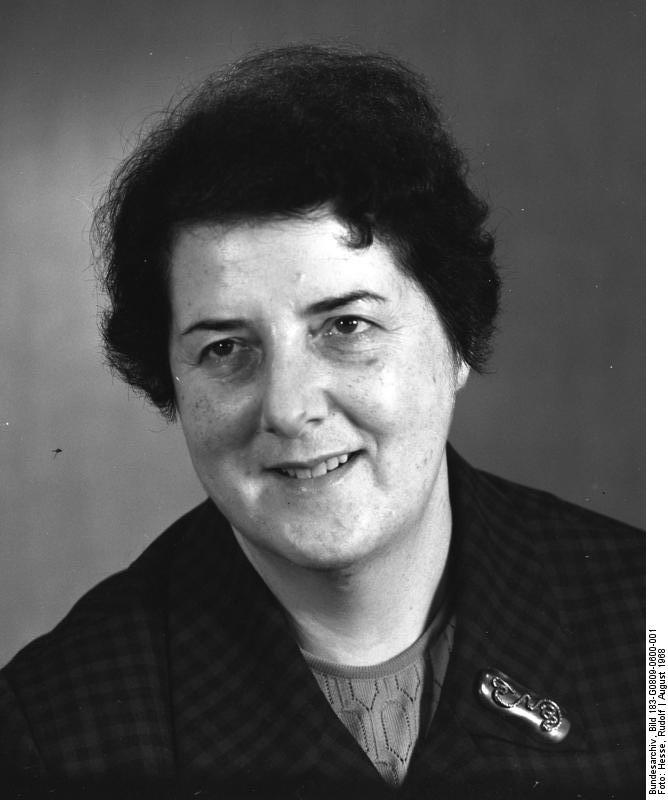
- Deba Wieland (1968)
- Born: Deba Raschkess; 25 March 1916; Moscow, Russia
- Died: 16 December 1992 (aged 76); Berlin, Germany
- Occupations: Political activist Journalist
- Political party: SED
- Spouse: Heinz Wieland

Deba Wieland (25 March 1916 – 16 December 1992) was a left-wing German journalist. Between 1952 and 1977, she was in charge at the (East) German News Service (Allgemeiner Deutscher Nachrichtendienst).

== Life ==
Deba Wieland was born at the height of the First World War, a year before the Treaty of Brest-Litovsk removed Russia from the war with Germany. Her father is described in sources as a German Trade representative based, at the time of her birth, in Moscow which is where she was born. Her mother worked as a book-keeper. From 1919, Wieland grew up in Riga which is where she attended Secondary School (Oberschule) and where in 1933, she passed her school final exams. She had already, in 1932, become a member of Latvia's illegal Young Communists organisation.

She studied commercial art in Strasbourg and Brussels. Strasbourg had been back in Germany since 1919 but remained for many purposes a German language city, and it was here that in 1933/34 she worked on the German language newspaper "Woman as Fighter" ("Frau als Kämpferin"). Meanwhile, in Germany, there had been a major regime change in January 1933 and the government had lost little time in moving towards one-party dictatorship. A feature of Nazi philosophy and of the new chancellor's own rhetoric, was a peculiar capacity for hatred, with Jews and Communists high on the target list. Wieland was a Jewish Communist, joining the Communist Party in France in 1937. From 1936, Wielland was a participant in the Spanish Civil War, but the focus of her life remained in Paris, by now the de facto headquarters of the German Communist Party in exile. Between 1937 and 1939, Wieland worked in Paris as a freelance illustrator, also undertaking translation work for the CGT (French Trades Union Confederation) and for L'Humanité, the Paris-based newspaper of the Communist Party.

In 1939 she moved to Moscow. Around this time, or possibly some years earlier, she married Heinz Wieland (1907-1980), a fellow communist who had spent much of 1933 held in "protective custody" in Nazi Germany, and who subsequently, like her, had taken part in the Spanish Civil War. Wieland worked as a translator and teacher at the sanitorium at Peredelkino which the Soviets had set up for Spanish Civil War veterans, and where Heinz Wieland was convalescing from serious wounds incurred in the fighting. Following the conclusion of a non-aggression pact between Nazi Germany and the Soviet Union, Latvia where she had spent much of her childhood fell under Soviet control, and in June 1941 Wieland returned to Riga. Later that month, relations between the two dictatorships abruptly broke down when Germany launched a vast military assault against the Soviet Union: towards the end of 1941, Wieland was evacuated with her invalid husband to Osh in what at that time was the Kirghiz Soviet Socialist Republic. They remained in the Soviet Union till 1946.

Returning to Berlin in June 1946, six months after her husband, she worked as a translator and editor with the Soviet News Service, based in the Weissensee district of Berlin. War had ended with defeat for Germany in May 1945, and a large swathe of what had previously been Germany, including the eastern part of Berlin, had become the Soviet occupation zone, under Soviet Soviet Administration, which left a desperate shortage of fluent Russian speakers across various sectors. In 1949, Wieland became a member of the Berlin-based National Journalists' Union.

Back in 1945, it had seemed, for many, reasonable to assume that the end of Nazi Germany marked the end of one-party dictatorship. Membership of the Communist Party was no longer illegal and in 1945, while still in the Soviet Union, Wieland rejoined the French Communist Party. By the time she got back to the west, the next summer, the German Communist Party had been replaced by the Socialist Unity Party (SED / Sozialistische Einheitspartei Deutschlands), through a contentious merger that within the Soviet occupation zone incorporated the more moderately left-wing Social Democratic Party (SPD) to form a unified party of the broad left, thereby reducing the risk that a resurgent Nazi Party might one day rise again and again exploit political splintering of the political left to re-establish a right-wing dictatorship. As matters turned out, the party merger involving the SPD and the Communists formed the basis for a rapid return to one-party dictatorship, and by the time the occupation zone was re-invented as the German Democratic Republic, formally in October 1949, party members with influence who had previously come from the SPD side in the merger had disappeared from positions of influence, and the young country's ruling SED (party) looked remarkably like the old Communist Party with a new name. Wieland had been a member since 1946. In December 1949, she took a job with her young country's Information Office under the direction of Gerhart Eisler, himself newly returned from several eventful years in the United States. She was promoted in March 1950 to take charge of the Office's department for the Soviet Union and People's Democracies. Between September 1950 and 1952, she was also a deputy head and a trainer at the important Society for German–Soviet Friendship. In parallel with her government positions, she sustained a career as a journalist and editor.

In 1952, she took over from Georg Hansen as Director - later "General Director" - of the (East) German News Service (Allgemeiner Deutscher Nachrichtendienst), a position she would retain till 1977. During this period, she also held various other positions near heart of the country's centralised power structure, most notably as a member of the Agitprop Commission of the Party Central Committee's powerful Politburo.

Deba Wieland retired in 1980 and died in Berlin in 1992.

== Awards and honours ==
- 1970: Patriotic Order of Merit
- 1976: Patriotic Order of Merit Gold clasp
- 1984: Star of People's Friendship in Gold
- 1986: Order of Karl Marx
