= Zschorlau =

- Municipality
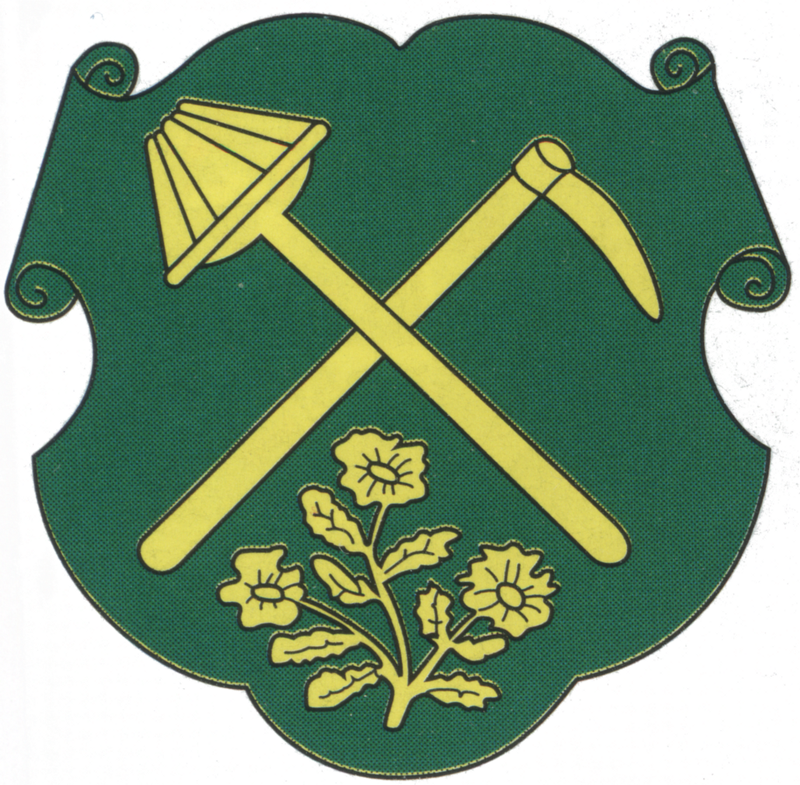
- Coat of arms

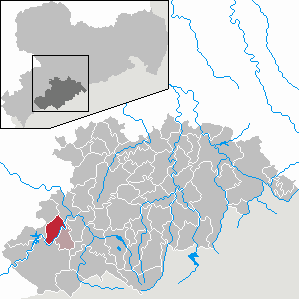
- Location of Zschorlau within Erzgebirgskreis district
- Interactive map of Zschorlau
- Location within Germany Location within Saxony
- Coordinates: 50°34′N 12°39′E
- Country: Germany
- State: Saxony
- District: Erzgebirgskreis
- Subdivisions: 3

Government
  - Mayor (2022–29): Wolfgang Leonhardt (CDU)

Area
  - Total: 21.99 km^{2} (8.49 sq mi)
- Elevation: 548 m (1,798 ft)

Population (2025-12-31)
  - Total: 4,965
  - Density: 225.8/km^{2} (584.8/sq mi)
- Time zone: UTC+01:00 (CET)
  - Summer (DST): UTC+02:00 (CEST)
- Postal codes: 08321
- Dialling codes: 03771
- Vehicle registration: ERZ, ANA, ASZ, AU, MAB, MEK, STL, SZB, ZP
- Website: www.zschorlau.de

Zschorlau (German pronunciation: [ˈt͡ʃɔʁlaʊ]) is a community in the district of Erzgebirgskreis in Saxony, Germany.

== Geography ==
=== Location ===
Zschorlau lies nestled in the gentle hills in the western Ore Mountains some 5 km from Aue and is overhung in the south by the Steinberg. The community, as is so with many former forest homestead villages (Waldhufendörfer) in the Ore Mountains, grew up on a stream, in this case the Zschorlaubach, which rises southwest of the community on a broad moory plateau known in the local speech as Dr Forst or Hoher Forst (“The Forest” or “High Forest”). Before the stream reaches the community, its waters feed the Filzteich (pond), a popular recreation area. At the end of the community’s area at the Gößnitzgrund comes a glen through which the Zschorlauer Talstraße (Zschorlau Valley Road) was built in 1907. Also in this glen is found the St. Anna am Freudenstein visitor mine.

=== Geology ===
The community lies on the southeast flank of the Schneeberger Lagerstätte (deposit), which reaches to the edge of the community. This is made clear by the headframe of the Türkschacht (mine) standing on a bank only a few metres behind the houses between Zschorlau and Neustädtel.

One thing that sets the St. Anna am Freudenstein visitor mine area apart is that it belongs geologically to the Schneeberger Lagerstätte, but is also considered an outlying part of that deposit.

Furthermore, the wolframite deposits discovered and mined in the municipal area are interesting.

=== Constituent communities ===
The centres of Albernau (with Schindlerswerk) and Burkhardtsgrün are parts of Zschorlau, which together with neighbouring Bockau forms an administrative community (Verwaltungsgemeinschaft).

== History ==
From 1952 to 1990, Zschorlau was part of the Bezirk Karl-Marx-Stadt of East Germany.

== Politics ==
=== Municipal council ===
Zschorlau’s council consists of 16 seats, 15 of which are held by the CDU and the other by the Albernauer Alternative.

=== Partnerships ===
There is a partnership with the community of Dietenhofen in the district of Ansbach.

== Culture and sightseeing ==
The St. Anna am Freudenstein visitor mine is found at the lower end of the community on the connecting road to Aue, where the traditional Mettenschicht (literally “matins shift”) is still held at Christmas today, and it is public. It is a special event held on the last mining shift before Christmas, and it involves music, food and drink. One other event in the community’s cultural life is the Sommergastspiel (“Summer Guest Performance”) by the Dombrowsky Puppet Theatre. Featuring plays for young and old, great numbers of visitors are lured to the quartz cave to Germany’s first underground puppet theatre.

=== Education ===
Zschorlau has at its disposal the Mittelschule Zschorlau (middle school) and the Grundschule Zschorlau (elementary school).
