= Herbert Bochow =

German author (1906–1942)

Herbert Bochow (20 November 1906 – 5 June 1942) was a German communist writer and resistance fighter.

== Biography ==
Herbert Bochow was born in to a middle-class family. He initially belonged to the völkisch movement and was a member of the Young German Order. While studying philosophy in Leipzig, he came into contact with socialist students and artists, which led him to devote himself to the study of Marxism.

In 1929 he became a member of the Communist Party of Germany, leading his family to cut further financial support for his studies. Bochow then earns his living as a clerical employee and begins to use his artistic talent for political struggle. He wrote poems, novels and plays and also composed a cantata on the Communist Manifesto and scenes for the Leipzig agitprop troops of the KPD. He became a member of the Association of Proletarian-Revolutionary Authors after its founding.

After the Nazis came to power, Bochow was arrested and placed in “protective detention”. He was held in the Sachsenburg concentration camp until May 1934. After his release from prison, Bochow joined the resistance against Nazism. In November 1934, he was arrested by the Gestapo and sentenced to 18 months in prison.

After his release in the summer of 1936, he found connections with the KPD underground organization in Dresden. With the painter Fritz Schulze, Bochow tried to establish contacts with non-communist opponents of Hitler. The resulting resistance group in Dresden and Leipzig had more than 60 members of mostly artists and intellectuals. The circle includes the painters Albert Hensel and Eva Schulze-Knabe and the electrician Karl Stein. From 1940, Bochow also came into contact, via Elisabeth Pungs, with the Rütli group around Hanno Günther in Berlin.

In June 1941, Bochow was arrested for the third time. After weeks of interrogation and torture, on March 11, 1942, Herbert Bochow, Fritz Schulze and Albert Hensel were convicted of "high treason" and sentenced to death and executed on June 5 in Plötzensee prison in Berlin.

His son Frank, would later become a diplomat and politician in East Germany.
