= Banner of Labor =

Banner of Labor Banner der Arbeit
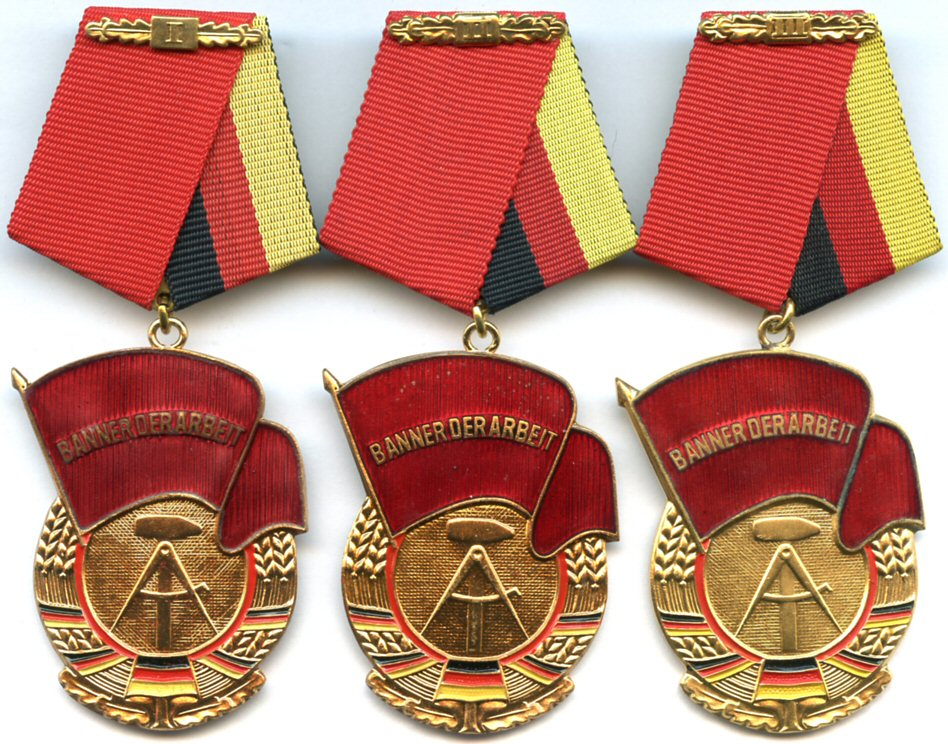
- Banner of Labor
- Awarded for: Excellent and long-standing service in strengthening and consolidating the GDR, especially for achieving outstanding results for the national economy
- Presented by: East Germany
- Status: No longer awarded
- Established: 4 August 1954
- Final award: 1 May 1989

Precedence
- Next (higher): Patriotic Order of Merit (de)

The Banner of Labor (German: Banner der Arbeit) was an order issued in the German Democratic Republic (GDR).

It was given for "excellent and long-standing service in strengthening and consolidating the GDR, especially for achieving outstanding results for the national economy".

The order was established on 4 August 1954 in one class. On 8 August 1974 it was divided into three classes. The 1st Class was the highest class and each class included a cash award:

- 1st Class: 1,000 East German marks, limited to 250 per year
- 2nd Class: 750 East German marks, limited to 500 per year
- 3rd Class: 500 East German marks, limited to 1,000 per year

For collectives with up to 20 members, there were cash awards of 2,000, 3,500 and 5,000 Marks per member.

The Banner of Labor was awarded to:

- Individuals and collectives in all three classes
- Enterprises, Collective organizations (German: Kombinate), institutions and cooperatives in the 1st Class

A prerequisite was that individuals and members of collectives already had received other state awards. The Order could be given in any class several times, even to citizens of other countries.

The awards ceremony took place each year on 1 May until 1989 and this order was presented by the Chairman of the State Council or on his behalf. A certificate was presented with the Order.

The medal is gilded, with dimensions of 44 x 37 mm. It is worn on the left chest. Establishments were entitled to include a symbol of the Order on their flag as well as on documents.

== Recipients ==
- 1955: Luise Ermisch
- 1959: Walter Arnold (Germany)
- 1960: Hermann Axen, Friedrich Burmeister, Georg Ulrich Handke, Willi Bredel, Werner Bruschke
- 1962: Kurt Hager
- 1963: Erich Hans Apel, Ernst Albert Altenkirch, Walter Halbritter, Paul Fröhlich, Günter Mittag, Hermann Pöschel
- 1964: Rudi Georgi, Willi Stoph, Günther Wyschofsky
- 1965: Peter Florin, Grete Groh-Kummerlöw, Ernst Scholz, Erich Engel
- 1967: Rudi Georgi
- 1968: Wilhelm Adam, Roman Chwalek, Horst Dohlus, Werner Lamberz
- 1969: Julius Balkow, Lilly Becher, Klaus Gysi, Walter Halbritter, Ernst-Joachim Gießmann, Helmut Kirchberg, Paul Markowski, Hermann Pöschel, Kurt Wünsche
- 1970: Horst Dohlus
- 1974: Manfred Feist, Wolfgang Gress
- 1976: Bruno Lietz, Eberhard Heinrich
- 1978: Manfred Bochmann
- 1979: Hubert Egemann
- 1981: Gisela Glende
- 1984: Bruno Lietz, Siegfried Lorenz, Erik Neutsch
- 1986: Egon Krenz
- 1988: Hartmut Buschbacher

== See also ==
- Orders, decorations, and medals of East Germany
