= Eberhard Heinrich =

German politician and journalist (1926–2019)

Chairman of the Association of Journalists of the GDR
- In office January 1981 – 27 January 1990
- Preceded by: Harri Czepuck
- Succeeded by: Gerd Kurze

Personal details
- Born: 12 March 1926 Schönau an der Katzbach, Province of Lower Silesia, Free State of Prussia, Weimar Republic (now Świerzawa, Poland)
- Died: 11 February 2019 (aged 92)
- Party: Socialist Unity Party (1946–1989)
- Other political affiliations: Communist Party of Germany (1946)
- Domestic partner: Lieselotte Thoms-Heinrich
- Education: "Karl Marx" Party Academy
- Occupation: Journalist; Party Functionary
- Awards: Patriotic Order of Merit, 1st class; Banner of Labor; Star of Peoples' Friendship, 2nd class
- Central institution membership: 1971–1989: Candidate member, Central Committee; Other offices held: 1965–1980: Member, Agitation Commission at the Politburo; 1962–1965: First Deputy Editor-in-chief, Neues Deutschland

Eberhard Heinrich (12 March 1926 – 2019) was a German journalist.

He was a member of the Party Politburo Agitation Committee in the German Democratic Republic from 1965, and in 1981 he replaced Harri Czepuck as chairman of the country's national Union of Journalists.

== Life ==
Eberhard Heinrich was born in a small rural town in Lower Silesia, roughly 80 km (50 miles) west of Breslau. His father was a clerical employee. Heinrich attended a commercially focused school and started on an industrial/commercial training. In 1943 he was arrested and held in youth detention for several months on account of "illegal political activity". In 1944 he was excluded from the Hitler Youth and conscripted for National Labour service. At this stage of the war, with the German army having suffered massive casualties, national labour service rapidly became conscription into the army even for boys who a few years earlier would have been considered too young to serve. Heinrich deserted from the army in 1945 which was the year in which, in May 1945, the war ended. He spent 1945/46 as a Prisoner of War, held by the Americans, at the same time working at agricultural labour and relief work in Lützelsachsen.

In May 1945 what remained of Germany had been divided into four principal zones for military occupation. Eberhard's home region of Lower Silesia was now part of Poland, survivors from its formerly German speaking population having been persuaded to leave. Lützelsachsen where he had been imprisoned was to the west, in the American occupation zone. As soon as he was able, however, in June 1946 Eberhard Heinrich relocated to the east, settling in the Soviet occupation zone. Here the way was already being paved for a return to one-party government with a contentious merger, in April 1946, between the old Communist Party and the Moderate-left SPD. Heinrich lost no time in joining the resulting Socialist Unity Party (SED / Sozialistische Einheitspartei Deutschlands), now the ruling party for what would become the German Democratic Republic, formally founded in October 1949.

In October 1946 Heinrich became a volunteer editorial assistant with the left-wing newspaper Vorwärts: he stayed with the paper at least through most of 1947. Between October 1947 and May 1948 he underwent a journalistic training at the Party Academy. Heinrich was evidently still associated with Vorwärts in 1949 which was when The Party took the decision to merge the Berlin edition of Vorwärts with Neues Deutschland, the official mass-circulation newspaper of the ruling SED (party) and thereby of the German Democratic Republic. The merger took effect on 1 January 1950. Eberhard Heinrich now joined Neues Deutschland, workling between 1950 and 1962 as a departmental head and editorial secretary. Between 1962 and 1965 he served as the newspaper's deputy chief editor. During this period, in 1953, he also undertook a correspondence degree course with the Leipzig Journalism Academy.

Moving beyond the world of journalism, between 1965 and 1980 he worked full-time with the Party Politburo Agitation Commission, taking a succession of increasingly senior roles before becoming the personal assistant to Werner Lamberz, the Commission Secretary, following whose death Heinrich himself served as Commission Secretary between 1978 and December 1980. Although Heinrich never actually followed Lamberz to become a member of the powerful Party Central Committee, his name did feature on the list of candidates for membership from 1971 right up till the institutional collapse of 1989/90. He was, however, on the central committee of the East German Union of Journalists, serving as the union president in succession to Harri Czepuck between 1981 and 1990. This led to international roles including vice-presidency of the (Soviet sponsored) International Organization of Journalists and chairmanship of the International council for journalism training.

== Personal ==
Publications (selection)

- (under the Pseudonym Hans Adler) Bonn – Stadt und Staat im Sumpf
- (under the Pseudonym Hans Adler) Berlin in jenen Tagen. Berichte aus der Zeit von 1945–1948
- (together with Klaus Ullrich/Huhn) Befehdet seit dem ersten Tag. Über drei Jahrzehnte Attentate gegen die DDR
- (together with Klaus Ullrich/Huhn) Nacht über Grenada. Die Geschichte einer USA-Aggression
- (together with Klaus Ullrich/Huhn) Der Krieg einer unsichtbaren Armee. Porträt der CIA

Eberhard Heinrich was married to Lieselotte Thoms-Heinrich, a journalist and, between 1963 and 1990, a longstanding member of the National Legislature (Volkskammer).

== Awards and honours ==
- 1959 German Democratic Republic Service Medal
- 1961 Patriotic Order of Merit in bronze
- 1965 Patriotic Order of Merit in silver
- 1970 Lenin Jubilee Medal
- 1970 Distinguished Service Medal (army)
- 1974 Patriotic Order of Merit in gold
- 1976 Banner of Labor
- 1986 Star of People's Friendship

== Sources ==
- Traueranzeige im neuen deutschland vom 2. März 2019, S. 6.
