= Otto Buchwitz =

German politician (1879–1964)

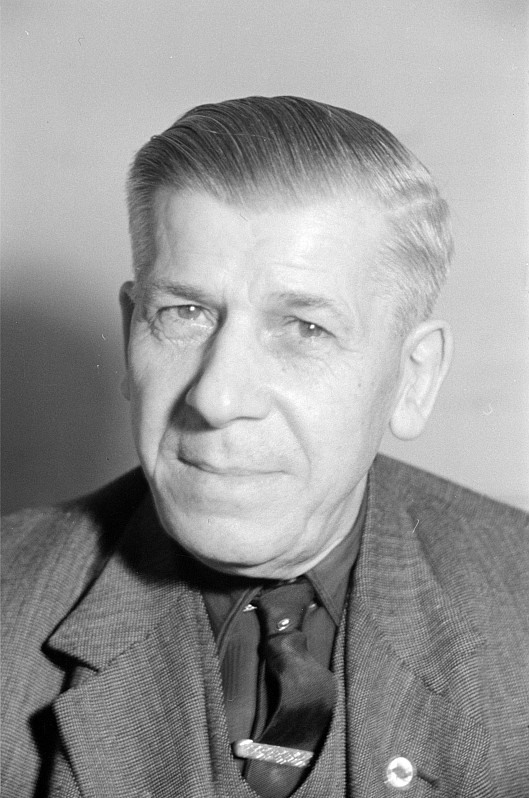
- Buchwitz in 1947

Chairman of the Central Party Control Commission
- In office 29 November 1948 – 24 July 1950 Serving with Hermann Matern
- Preceded by: Position established
- Succeeded by: Hermann Matern

Chairman of the Socialist Unity Party in Saxony
- In office 21 April 1946 – 4 December 1948 Serving with Wilhelm Koenen
- Deputy: Otto Schön; Erich Mückenberger
- Preceded by: Position established
- Succeeded by: Ernst Lohagen; Erich Mückenberger
Parliamentary constituencies
Member of the Volkskammer
In office 8 November 1950 – 9 July 1964
Preceded by	Constituency established
Succeeded by	Heinz Franke
Member of the Reichstag for Liegnitz
In office 27 May 1924 – 7 July 1933
Preceded by	multi-member district
Succeeded by	Constituency abolished

Personal details
- Born: Otto Buchwitz; 27 April 1879 Breslau, Province of Silesia, Kingdom of Prussia, German Empire (now Wrocław, Poland)
- Died: 9 July 1964 (aged 85) Dresden, Bezirk Dresden, East Germany
- Party: Socialist Unity Party (1946–1964)
- Other political affiliations: Social Democratic Party (1898–1946)
- Occupation: Politician; Party Functionary; Metal Worker
- Awards: Order of Karl Marx; Hero of Labour; Patriotic Order of Merit, 1st class; Lenin Peace Prize; Banner of Labor
- Central institution membership: 1946–1964: Full member, Central Committee (Note: Party Executive Committee until 1950); Other offices held: 1949–1950: Member, Provisional Volkskammer; 1948–1949: Member, German People's Council; 1946–1952: President, Landtag of Saxony; 1946–1952: Member, Landtag of Saxony; 1921–1924: Member, Landtag of Prussia

Otto Buchwitz (27 April 1879 – 9 July 1964) was a German resistance fighter against National Socialism, politician and party functionary of the Social Democratic Party (SPD) and Socialist Unity Party (SED).

A Social Democratic politician in the Weimar Republic, Buchwitz went into exile in Denmark until being arrested and imprisoned in 1940. After the war, he supported the forced merger of the SPD and KPD and subsequently co-chaired the SED in Saxony and, briefly, the powerful Central Party Control Commission (ZPKK).

His career was cut short in 1950, when former Social Democrats were largely purged from party functions.

== Life and career ==
=== Early career ===
After attending elementary school from 1885 to 1893, Buchwitz completed an apprenticeship as a metal spinner and iron turner until 1896. He joined the German Metal Workers' Union in 1896 and became a member of the Social Democratic Party (SPD) in 1898. Until 1907, Buchwitz worked in his trained profession, but also as a weaver. From 1908, he served as the secretary of the German Textile Workers' Association for the Chemnitz area.

Drafted for military service in 1914, he was stationed in East Prussia by the end of the war.

=== Weimar Republic ===
Afterwards, in 1919, he became the deputy district administrator for the Görlitz district. Additionally, in 1920, Buchwitz was elected as political secretary of the SPD in Lower Silesia.

From the beginning of the Weimar Republic, he was a member of the Lower Silesian Provincial Parliament. He also represented the SPD as a deputy in the Prussian Landtag from 1921 to 1924, and as a representative from electoral constituency 8 (Liegnitz) in the Reichstag from 1924 to 1933.

Buchwitz additionally helped to establish the Reichsbanner Schwarz-Rot-Gold in 1924 and the Iron Front in Lower Silesia in 1931. In 1932, he was arrested for illegally carrying a weapon and sentenced to three months in prison.

=== Nazi Germany ===
After the Nazis came to power, Buchwitz, along with other SPD Reichstag deputies, voted against the Enabling Act and subsequently went into exile in Denmark.

From there, Buchwitz organized the escape of German regime opponents to Sweden and wrote for the anti-fascist weekly Freies Deutschland published in Brussels. On 16 September 1937, he was stripped of his German citizenship. Only a few days after the German occupation of Denmark in April 1940, he was arrested in Copenhagen and handed over to the Gestapo in July. In July 1941, he was sentenced to eight years in prison.

Buchwitz was first imprisoned in Brandenburg-Görden Prison, then in Sonnenburg concentration camp. There, the illegal communist leadership contacted him, and they discussed their course of action until the end of Nazi rule and thereafter.

On 27 April 1945, the prison director Thümmler and most of the guards fled before the approaching Red Army. The political prisoners disarmed the remaining guards and took over the leadership of the prison. A military formation occupied the gate. Around 2 PM, the first Soviet tank reached the prison. On 28 April, about 100 former political prisoners moved via Bagow and Nauen to Berlin. Buchwitz was so weakened that he had to be transported in a handcart.

=== Soviet occupation zone ===
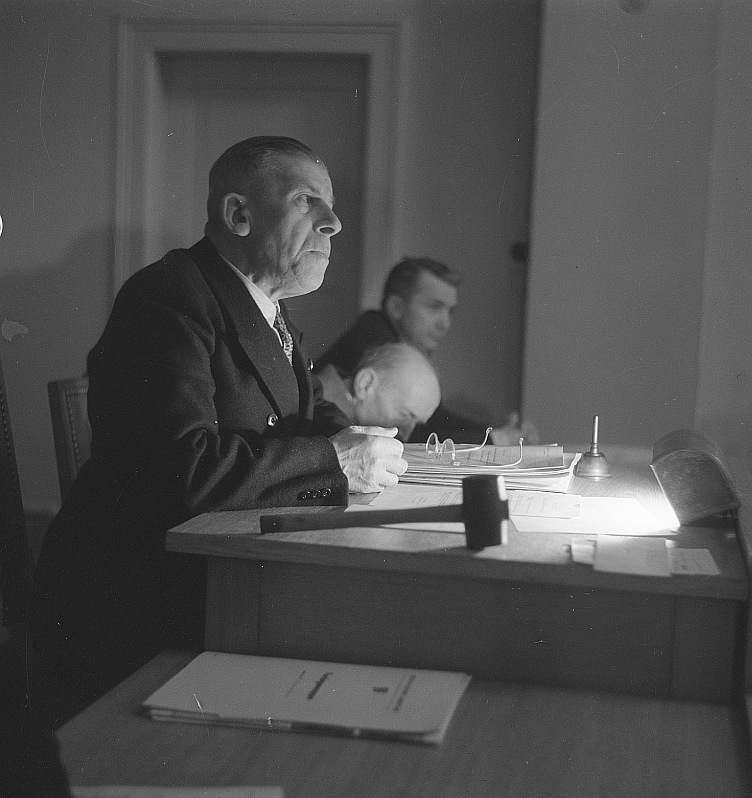
Buchwitz presiding over the Landtag of Saxony in 1948

After 1945, Buchwitz actively participated in the forced merger of the SPD and KPD into the SED, despite not being a friend of the KPD before the war. His fiercest adversary in this regard in Saxony was Stanislaw Trabalski, whom he called Krawalski ("Krawall" meaning "riot" in German). Subsequently, from April 1946 to December 1948, he co-chaired the SED state leadership in Saxony in parity with former Communist Wilhelm Koenen. From April 1946 to July 1964, he was a full member of the Party Executive Committee (PV), later Central Committee of the SED.

Buchwitz additionally was a member of the Saxon state parliament from 1946 until its dissolution in 1952. During this time, he was also the president of the state parliament and held a seat in the Volkskammer, which first convened in 1950. Buchwitz was the oldest member of the Volkskammer since 1950.

On 29 November 1948, he was elected chairman of the Central Party Control Commission (ZPKK), the supreme disciplinary body of the SED, in parity alongside former Communist Hermann Matern.

=== East Germany ===
In the course of the Stalinization of the SED, former Social Democrats were gradually removed. In July 1950, the III. Party Congress of the SED eliminated the equal representation between former Social Democrats and former Communists in central party functions. As a result, Buchwitz had to step down from chairing the ZPPK. Afterwards, he remained a regular member of the ZPKK until his death.

He unsuccessfully tried to calm the uprising on 17 June 1953.

In 1953, he retired from full-time activity for health reasons. In 1957, Buchwitz was appointed an honorary senator of the Technical University of Dresden, and on 27 April 1963, he became an honorary citizen of Dresden.

=== Death and legacy ===
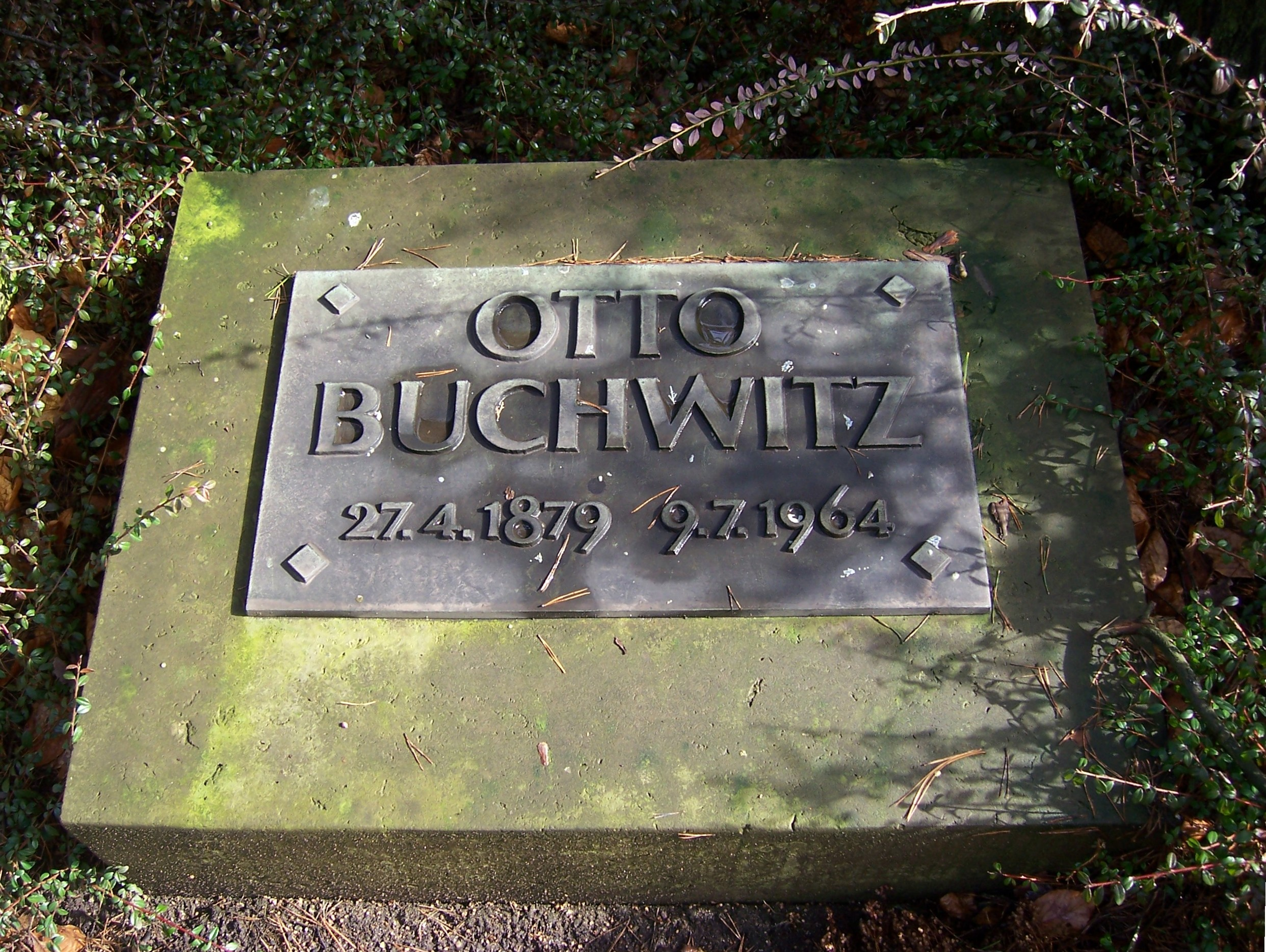
Buchwitz's grave in 2009

Buchwitz died on 9 July 1964, in Dresden and his grave is located at the Heidefriedhof there.

After his death, several streets, schools and other public facilities in the GDR were named after Buchwitz, including a street in East Berlin, the cultural center in Reichenbach/O.L., a youth hostel in Altenberg and an FDGB vacation home (opened in 1984) in Schellerhau near Altenberg, most of which were renamed after German reunification.

In Glauchau, the Spinnstoffwerk in the GDR era bore the name "VEB Spinnstoffwerk Otto Buchwitz," as shown by company documents in the factory ruins (2023).

Currently, there are still Otto Buchwitz streets in Oderwitz, Bernsdorf (Oberlausitz), Mülsen, and Aschersleben, Otto Buchwitz Square in Görlitz, and Otto Buchwitz Ring in Neukirch/Lausitz.

In 1961, the children's book publisher Berlin published "The Famous Great-Grandfather" (The Little Trumpeter Books 19), based on motifs from Buchwitz's published memoirs. The author, Gottfried Herold, did not mention Buchwitz's SPD membership.
