= Werner Eberlein =

German politician (1919–2002)

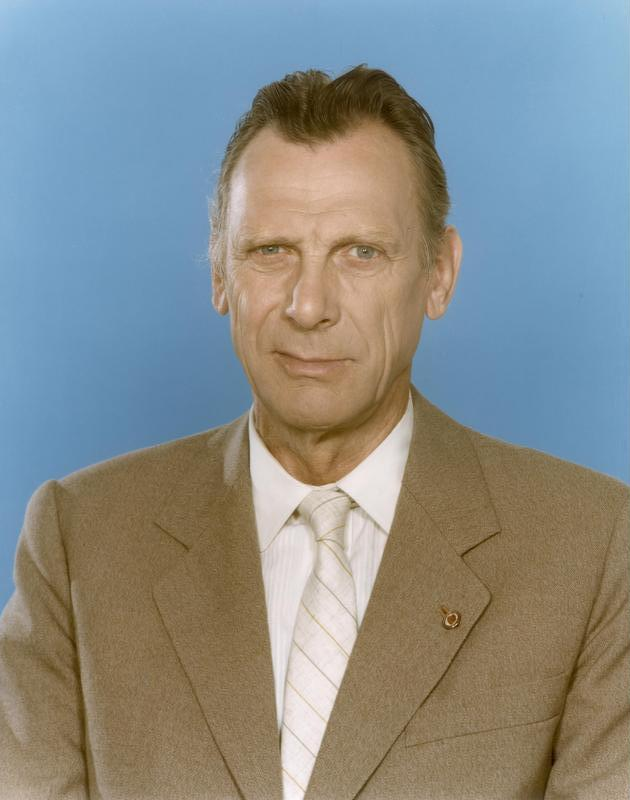
- Eberlein in 1986

Chairman of the Central Party Control Commission
- In office 8 November 1989 – 3 December 1989
- General Secretary: Egon Krenz
- Deputy: Werner Müller
- Preceded by: Erich Mückenberger
- Succeeded by: Position abolished

First Secretary of the Socialist Unity Party in Bezirk Magdeburg
- In office 22 June 1983 – 12 November 1989
- Second Secretary: Walter Kirnich
- Preceded by: Kurt Tiedke
- Succeeded by: Wolfgang Pohl
Volkskammer
Member of the Volkskammer for Magdeburg
In office 16 June 1986 – 11 January 1990
Preceded by	Multi-member district
Succeeded by	Karl-Heinz Richtetzky

Personal details
- Born: Werner Eberlein; 9 November 1919 Mariendorf, Province of Brandenburg, Free State of Prussia, Weimar Republic (now Berlin-Mariendorf, Germany)
- Died: 11 October 2002 (aged 82) Berlin, Germany
- Party: SED (1948–1989); PDS (1989–2002)
- Parents: Hugo Eberlein (father); Luise Harms (mother)
- Relatives: Klaus Huhn (half-brother)
- Education: Moscow Higher Party School
- Occupation: Politician; Party Functionary; Interpreter; Journalist
- Awards: Patriotic Order of Merit, 1st class; Order of Karl Marx
- Central institution membership: 1986–1989: Full member, Politburo of the Central Committee; 1985–1986: Candidate member, Politburo of the Central Committee; 1960–1989: Full member, Central Committee; Other offices held: 1984–1989: Member, National Defence Council; 1971–1981: Member, Central Auditing Commission; 1964–1983: Deputy Head, Party Organs Department of the Central Committee; 1960–1964: Member, Agitation Commission at the Politburo

Werner Eberlein (9 November 1919 – 11 October 2002) was a German politician and high-ranking party functionary of the Socialist Unity Party (SED).

Rising to prominence as Russian interpreter to state and party leader Walter Ulbricht, he served as the First Secretary of the SED in Bezirk Magdeburg and as a member of the Politburo of the Central Committee of the SED in the 80s.

== Early life and career ==
=== Soviet Union exile ===
His father, Hugo Eberlein, was one of the founding members of the Communist Party of Germany (KPD) at the end of 1918. After being imprisoned in France, Hugo Eberlein was in exile in Moscow in Hotel Lux from autumn 1936 and, like many other German emigrants in the Soviet Union, became a victim of Stalin's Great Terror.

Werner Eberlein had to emigrate to the Soviet Union to live with his stepmother Inna Armand in 1934. After his father death, he was exiled from the Lux, spending eight years in Siberia - known as "Wolodja" - and only returning to Germany in 1948.

He worked as press officer for the SED party executive committee and, after attending the CPSU's Moscow Higher Party School from 1951 to 1954, as a journalist for the SED Zentralorgan newspaper Neues Deutschland.

== Political career ==
=== Chief Interpreter ===
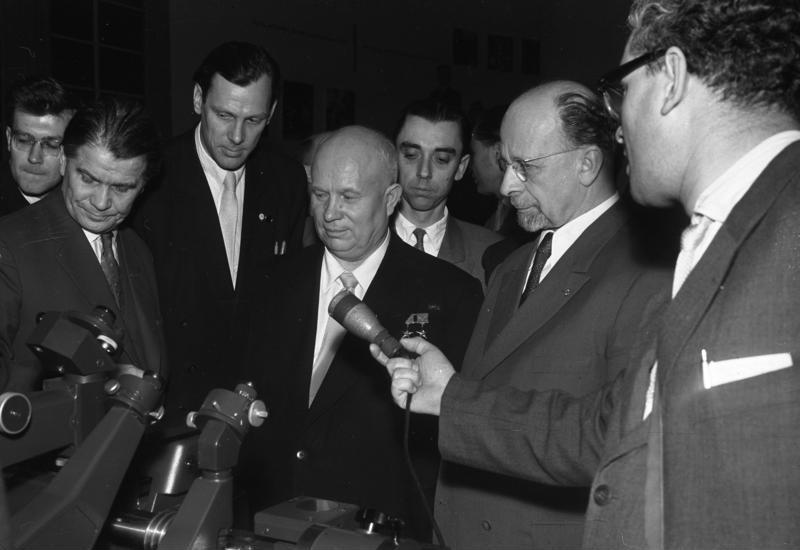
Eberlein (left of center) translating Nikita Khrushchev (center) for Walter Ulbricht (right of center) in March 1959

In the German Democratic Republic, under state and party leader Walter Ulbricht, he became the chief Russian interpreter, gaining widespread recognition through numerous television appearances ("Khrushchev's Voice") as he conveyed the emotional style of the Soviet party leader into German. "The Tall One", as he was called, was hard to miss due to his height, and his lively humor was also well known.

=== SED Central Committee ===
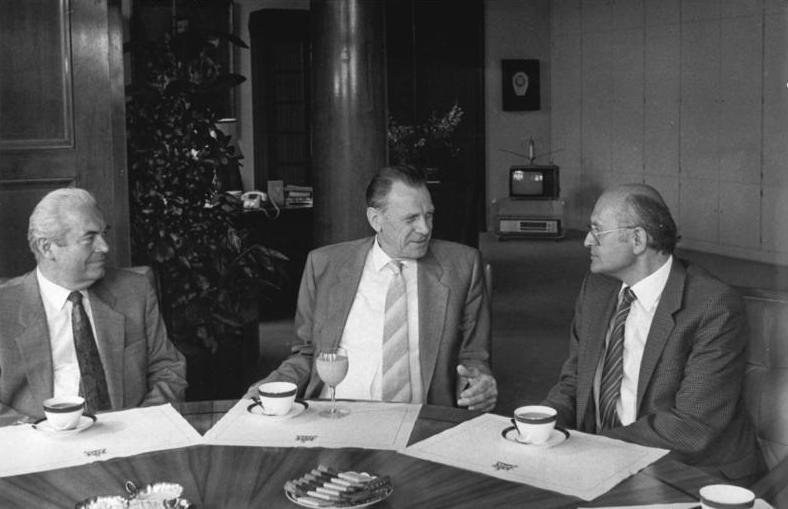
Eberlein (center) visiting Lord Mayor of Hanover Herbert Schmalstieg (right) in July 1987

Since 1960, Eberlein worked at the Central Committee of the SED, serving as deputy head of its powerful Party Organs Department from 1964 to 1983.

In 1983, almost at retirement age, he surprisingly became the First Secretary of the SED in Bezirk Magdeburg, succeeding Kurt Tiedke, who became principal of the "Karl Marx" Party Academy, and held this position until 1989. Additionally, he was elected to the National Defence Council of the GDR in 1984. He became known as a reformer.

From 1985 to 1986, he was a candidate member and since 21 April 1986 (XI. Party Congress) a full member of the Politburo of the SED, the de facto highest leadership body in East Germany. This was likely due to his friendship with General Secretary Erich Honecker and the political significance of the Bezirk Magdeburg because of its long western border with West Germany.

=== Peaceful Revolution ===
During the Wende in late 1989, he briefly served as the chairman of the powerful Central Party Control Commission (ZPKK), succeeding the retiring 79-year-old longtime chairman Erich Mückenberger. The Bezirk Magdeburg SED chose reformer Wolfgang Pohl as his successor as First Secretary.

Though in office for less than a month, the Central Party Control Commission made numerous crucial decisions in that time, among other things expelling Honecker and Günter Mittag while rehabilitating Robert Havemann and Rudolf Herrnstadt.

== Later life and death ==
=== Reunified Germany ===
After the Wende, he was a member of the Elder Council of the PDS. He is one of the few high-ranking former SED officials to not have been expelled.

Like other former Politburo members, Eberlein was charged with "complicity in manslaughter" (political responsibility for the fatal shootings at the Berlin Wall) by the Berlin Regional Court in the Berlin Wall shooting trials. However, the proceedings were abandoned, Eberlein being seriously ill.

He was interviewed in the 1994 documentary Der kalte Patriarch (English: The cold patriarch) about Ulbricht and the 1999 documentary Die Sekretäre (English: The secretaries) about Ulbricht and Honecker.

In 2002, Eberlein died of a heart attack while lawn mowing. His urn was interred in the grave complex for victims of fascism and those persecuted by the Nazi regime at the Berlin Central Cemetery Friedrichsfelde, where his father Hugo Eberlein is also commemorated.

He was a half-brother of the journalist Klaus Huhn.
