= Culture of Remembrance =

Interaction of a group with their past

Erinnerungskultur (from German), or Culture of Remembrance, is the interaction of an individual or a society with their past and history. The phrase is most often used to describe modern Germany and its relationship with the history of its Nazi era.

== Definition ==
In the strictest sense, Remembrance Culture consists of all the behavioral configurations and socially approved or acquired manners of a society or group used to keep parts of the past in their consciousness and thus deliberately make it present. The central theme is not the display of historical and objective knowledge but primarily collective and subjective perceptions of historical connections to the past from a current perspective. One can distinguish between private and public Remembrance Culture as well as their respective regular and event-based elements. The striking thing about a Culture of Remembrance is the fact that collective perceptions shape subjective ones. Social conflicts, relationships and problems influence a Remembrance Culture. In a pronounced Culture of Remembrance, less emphasized elements are likely to be forgotten. Family albums, genealogical research or anniversaries with personal or familial significance are examples of private or subjective forms of Remembrance Culture. Works from a Remembrance Culture can officially be designated as cultural artefacts or cultural monuments if there is a long-standing public interest.

== Expression and forms ==
Particularly within the public Culture of Remembrance, expressions can be found in a variety of initiatives and approaches, for example the archiving of information, its scientific innovation and finally public documentation and other media presentation. Apart from these forms which are more linked to the event itself, other crucial forms of Remembrance Culture are memorial sites, commemoration days and monuments. Certain events, like for example the Historians Dispute provide a rather constant discussion platform for it in the short term but there are many intense social discussions surrounding it from different topic areas. They very quickly touch on political interests and for that reason they are also subjected to a potential instrumentalization through current affairs. Thereby, questions concerning the Culture of Remembrance, thus the perception of it is closely linked with questions regarding authorizing claims to power and that of creating a national identity. In many cases, this leads to the government ritualization of the Culture of Remembrance and determines a number of taboos in society. The politicization of Erinnerungskultur is above all noticeable in regime changes, in which the previous understanding of past events is altered under new leadership. An obvious example is the way in which we approach monuments, which commemorate heroes from past regimes. They however are not honored in the same way following a change in regime.

== Examples ==
In Germany, Austria and in many other countries, the Culture of Remembrance is essentially a synonym for remembering the Holocaust and the sacrifices made during National Socialism.

However, a central aspect of the Culture of Remembrance is not only the German experience, but also genocides that have occurred or are still occurring in other countries - especially when this also still affects disadvantaged minorities. Examples of such genocide are Namibia (the Herero and Nama genocide), Armenia and Turkey (the Armenian Genocide) and Rwanda (the Rwandan Genocide). There are also examples such as Apartheid in South Africa, the Reign of Terror of the Red Khmer in Cambodia, the acts of Stalin in the Soviet Union, Chairman Mao's regime in China or the war crimes committed by the Japanese army in eastern Asia during the Second Sino-Japanese War. They are still of huge significance with their predominantly strong, ritualized ways of remembrance. Nevertheless, they are in many respects not properly reviewed.

== International cooperation in the field of Erinnerungskultur ==
In Europe, the French-German collaboration regarding remembrance can serve as a template for relations between other countries, such as those between Germany and Poland. These two countries have to come to terms with their shared painful past in order to strengthen current relations. Among other things there is a multifaceted dialogue: there have been many events throughout European history which allow for a comparison of different remembrance cultures.

== Conservation, restoration and reconstruction ==
A recent example of reconstruction can be found at the Dresden Frauenkirche. Anastylosis is the approach used here; the correct positions of many surviving stones from the old construction were calculated and visibly preserved in the new construction.

A lyricist from Dresden, Durs Grünbein, called this attempt of reconstruction from a critical distance "Chimäre Dresden" (chimera of Dresden), and used the term as the title of a lyrical work. Similar conflicts arose during the reconstruction of Heidelberg Castle, which remains unfinished.

== Current discussion ==
In 2011, during the event "Memorial Mania" there was discussion about suitable dates for the construction of monuments and the risk of instrumentalizing them for political purposes. The US expert for monuments, James Young, who had introduced the concept of "Counter-Memorial" to characterize the monumental aesthetics of Holocaust memorials, placed the New York Memorial and Museum at Ground Zero in this tradition. There was a talk about the appropriate moments for the construction of the monuments and the danger of the exploitation of the monuments for social enforcement.

Other prominent and current conflicts about the culture of remembrance are i.e. the reconstruction of Berlin City Palace in the place of the Palace of the Republic, Dresdner Frauenkirche that was restored via anastylosis, and the expansion of Prora (that was planned to be a KdF-Seebad, but was however extended to Stalinist barracks) in Rügen to luxury real estate.

== Role in the foundation of national identity ==
Culture of remembrance, a historical sorrow, was only of minor importance in the conflict of the Berlin "Holocaust Monument". According to Jan-Holger Kirsch, its proper significance consists in "redefining of ‘the national identity’ in the unified Germany". The monument is considered to be a prominent exhibit of the Berlin Republic, in which the acknowledgments of nation and historical guilt are not seen as contradiction anymore. Thereby, the Holocaust can be used as a form of identity politics through which especially Jews are excluded once more.

== Critique of Erinnerungskultur ==
=== Loss of Authenticity Through Sacralization ===
The historian K. Erik Franzen comments in an article about Dachau that the topography of the site has maintained a strong religious focus through the construction of different religious memorials that encourage the guiding principle of Christian reconciliation. "The "authenticity" of the site has virtually disintegrated as part of its contact with the past- if there was even such a thing as an authentic site to begin with."

=== Suggestive Museumization ("Suggestive Musealisierung") ===
In her autobiography, Weiter leben. Eine Jugend, the literary scholar and Holocaust survivor Ruth Klüger has contested whether Dachau, amongst other examples, is suitable for use as an educational facility and museum. She writes that Dachau is so clean and orderly that it almost feels inviting, as if it were evoking the memory of a former holiday camp rather than of a tortured existence. In a conversation about the growing memorialization of memory, she expressed the view that "Pathos and Kitsch" would shift the view of reality and would not do justice to the victims. Aleida Assmann comments that for Klüger, "museumised places of remembrance" have become "Deckerinnerungen" ("screen memories").

=== Distorted language ===
Sigrid Jacobeit analyzes the distorted language of commemoration.

"The language of commemoration is ritualized, selective, variegated, standardized, and tends to explicitly transport a particular society to the relevant image of history". The past becomes decontextualized, uncoupled from political, societal and cultural concepts, and there is even an attempt "to master the past and to render it harmless for future generations". "Nie wieder!" ("Never again!") is in this case viewed as a cautionary and illusory solution.

=== Templates ===
Jan Assmann sees it as a "threatening sign" that the culture of remembrance is sometimes reduced to a template, whereby only that which fits the template is seen as valid, and that which doesn't is rejected.

== See also ==
- Collective memory
- Memorialization
- Politics of memory
- Truth-seeking
- Vergangenheitsbewältigung
