= Hördler =

Hördler is a German surname. Notable people with the surname include:

- Frank Hördler (born 1985), German ice hockey player
- Stefan Hördler, German historian who specializes in the Holocaust
