= Rudolf Herrnstadt =

German journalist and politician

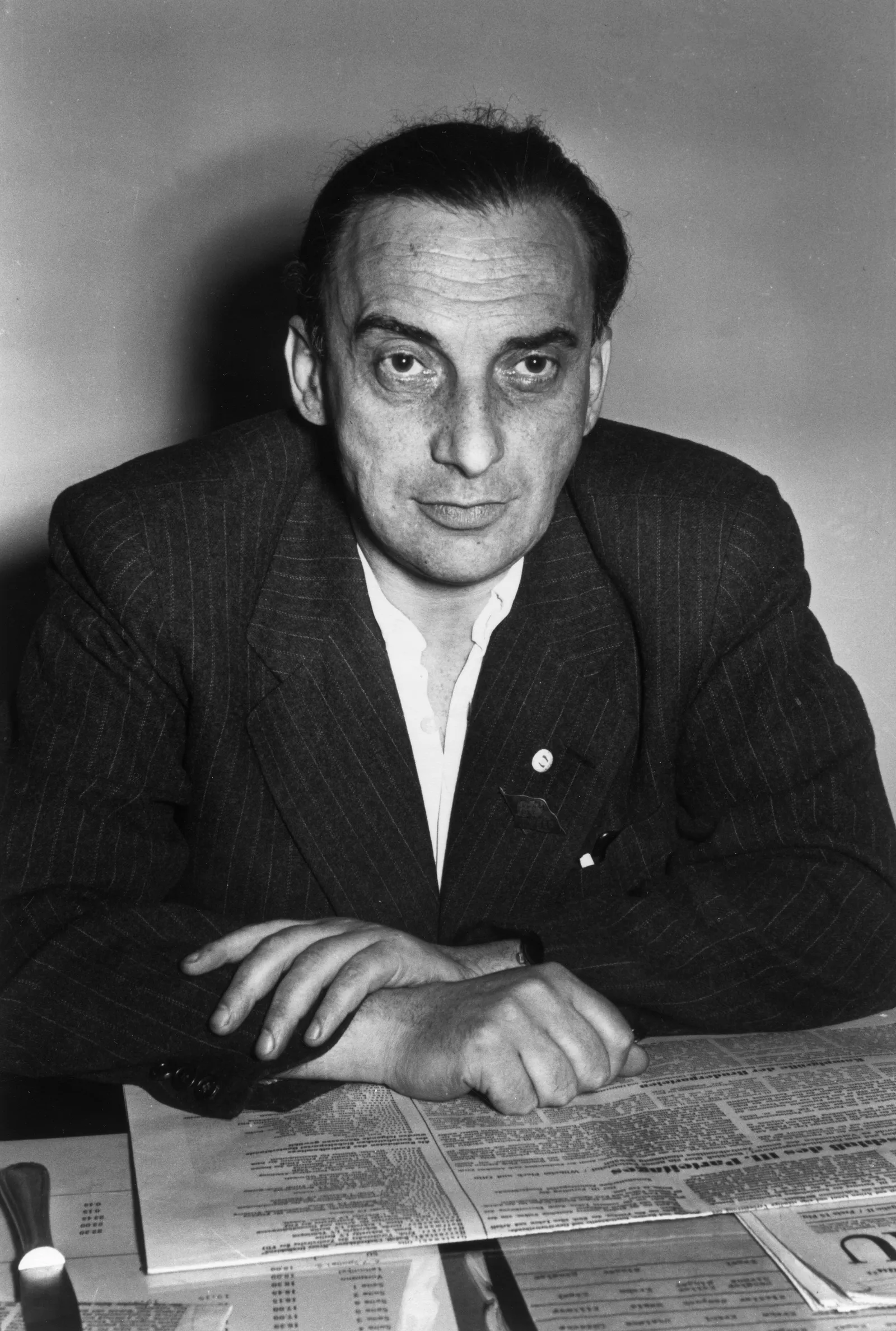
- Portrait by Jochen Moll c. 1950

Editor-in-chief of Neues Deutschland
- In office June 1949 – July 1953
- Preceded by: Adolf Ende and Max Nierich
- Succeeded by: Heinz Friedrich

Editor-in-chief of Berliner Zeitung
- In office July 1945 – May 1949
- Preceded by: Alexander Kirsanov
- Succeeded by: Gerhard Kegel

Member of the Volkskammer
- In office 30 May 1949 – 17 February 1954
- Preceded by: Multi-member district
- Succeeded by: Multi-member district

Personal details
- Born: 18 March 1903 Gleiwitz, Province of Silesia, German Empire (Gliwice, Poland)
- Died: 28 August 1966 (aged 63) Halle, Saxony-Anhalt, East Germany
- Party: KPD (1931–1946); SED (1946–1954)
- Domestic partner: Ilse Stöbe
- Occupation: Journalist
- Central institution membership: 1950–1953: Candidate member, Politburo of the Central Committee; 1950–1953: Full member, Central Committee

Rudolf Herrnstadt (18 March 1903 – 28 August 1966) was a German journalist and communist politician. After abandoning his law studies in 1922, Herrnstadt became a convinced communist. Despite his bourgeois origins, he was accepted into the Communist Party of Germany (KPD) in 1931 and worked for the Soviet military intelligence service Glawnoje Raswedywatelnoje Uprawlenije (GRU, "Main Administration for Intelligence"). As a foreign correspondent for the Berliner Tageblatt, he worked in Prague (1930), Warsaw (1931 to 1936) and Moscow (1933). He emigrated to the Soviet Union in 1939, days before the Invasion of Poland, where he was active in the fight against the Nazi state as editor-in-chief of the newspaper Freies Deutschland in the National Committee for a Free Germany from 1944 during the German-Soviet War.

After the end of World War II, Herrnstadt returned to Berlin in 1945, where he became the founding figure of the post-war press in Germany. He was editor-in-chief of the Berliner Zeitung, initially in the Soviet occupation zone and from 1949 in the German Democratic Republic (GDR), and played a key role in founding the Berliner Verlag publishers and the left-wing newspaper Neues Deutschland, the central organ of the Socialist Unity Party (SED). From 1950 to 1953 he was a member of the Central Committee (ZK) of the SED and a candidate for the Politburo of the SED.

In the early 1950s, Herrnstadt campaigned for democratization within the SED, but lost the power struggle against the General Secretary of the Central Committee, Walter Ulbricht. After the uprising of 17 June 1953, where Herrnstadt had shown understanding for the protests in articles in Neues Deutschland, he and other opponents of Ulbricht lost their seat on the Central Committee for "forming anti-party factions." In the same year, he also lost his position as editor-in-chief of Neues Deutschland. In 1954, he was expelled from the SED and was not rehabilitated until the end of his life.

== Life ==
Rudolf Herrnstadt came from a Jewish family in the Upper Silesian city of Gleiwitz (now Gliwice, Poland). His mother Maria-Clara came from a merchant family that had become wealthy after 1870. His father Dr Ludwig Herrnstadt worked as a lawyer and notary in Gleiwitz, and - despite his legal work for various large companies - had been a member of the Social Democratic Party of Germany (SPD) since 1894 and was a social democratic city councillor in Gleiwitz. In a CV written for the Soviet military intelligence service around 1930, Rudolf Herrnstadt wrote that his father earned around 1,200 Reichsmarks a month, while the monthly salary of an Upper Silesian industrial worker fluctuated between 80 and 150 marks. He therefore describes his father as a "member of the Jewish sector of the upper bourgeoisie". He had a brother Ernst Herrnstadt, born in 1906.

While exiled in Moscow, Herrnstadt met Valentina Veloyants (Валентина Велоянца), a scholar of Germany and together had a child Irina Liebmann who would go on to be journalist and well known author as well as a sinologist of Russo-German provenance.

== Education ==
Herrnstadt attended the Catholic grammar school in Gleiwitz from 1912 to 1921 and began studying law in 1921, initially at the Friedrich Wilhelm University in Berlin and then at the Ruprecht Karl University in Heidelberg from March 1922. In October 1922, Herrnstadt informed his parents that he did not want to continue his studies but wanted to work as a writer in the future. His father then ordered that his underage son had to work in the Upper Silesian pulp mills. Herrnstadt worked there until autumn 1924 as a payroll clerk, cashier, warehouse manager and finally as secretary to the management.

Against his parents' wishes, Herrnstadt returned to Berlin in November 1924. He earned his living from support payments from his parents and as an editor for the Drei-Masken publishing house, while at the same time working as a freelance writer. In May 1928 he applied to the left-wing Berliner Tageblatt and was initially employed as an unpaid assistant editor, and from autumn 1928 as a typesetter (known as a technical editor). He was one of the journalists promoted by Theodor Wolff. However, in November 1929, Herrnstadt was sacked by the Rudolf Mosse publishing company for writing a sensationalist story about 240,000 workers in the Ruhr region who had been locked out of work. Businesses using the paper for advertising threatened to withdraw their advertising budget, but Wolff brought Herrnstadt back to work in the editors office. Within the publishing house, Herrnstadt was known as a communist and was considered to be a member of the Communist Party of Germany (KPD) due to particular opinions he held.

At the newspaper, Herrnstadt met the aspiring German editor Ilse Stöbe, eight years his junior and became good friends with her. The couple eventually became engaged. Herrnstadt believed that the political ideology of capitalism with its inherent structural problems in the 1920s would be replaced by socialism, or indeed communism. From the beginning, Stöbe shared the same political ideology as Herrnstadt. There was an expectation that both of them would join the KPD. However, a study by the German historian Elke Scherstjanoi found that the couple were told by a KPD official in the Karl Liebknecht house that they were more useful to the communist party working outside the KPD. (Note: Herrnstadt joined the KPD on 1 July 1931 with membership number 521173 under the code name Friedrich Brockmann.) On 5 June 1930, Herrnstadt became the correspondent for the Berliner Tageblatt in Prague. While there he repeatedly tried to join the communist party. His persistence brought him to the notice of Soviet military intelligence, who recruited him as a Red Army GRU agent and gave him the codename "Arbin".

== Resistance ==
When Herrnstadt returned to Berlin in 1931, he introduced Stöbe to "Dr. Bosch", who in reality was the Soviet rezident in Berlin, the Latvian Jewish communist and historian Yakov Bronin (1904–1984). Bronin recruited Stöbe as an agent for the GRU. Her codename was "Arnim".

== Warsaw ==
In 1931, Herrnstadt was sent to Warsaw as a foreign correspondent for the Berliner Tageblatt. and found an apartment in Nowogrodzka. In Germany, the arrival of Adolf Hitler at the seat of power would have made Herrnstadt a target, both as an unrepentant communist activist and as a Jew.

Herrnstadt began the cultivation of a group of left-leaning, liberal anti-nazis as part of establishing a residenzy. By 1936, these included folk from the Germany embassy that included the ambassador Hans-Adolf von Moltke, the legation councillor Rudolf von Scheliha and the press-secretary Hans Graf Huyn, as well as connections to the Polish writer Jarosław Iwaszkiewicz, poet Julian Tuwim, the actress Ida Kaminska and the Polish foreign minister Josef Beck. Herrnstadt's espionage group in Warsaw was made up of him and Stöbe and included Gerhard Kegel and his wife Charlotte Vogt, the couple Marta (Margarita) and lawyer Kurt Welkisch, at times also the publisher Helmut Kindler and his childhood friend, the lawyer Lothar Bolz. Kindler in his book "Zum Abschied ein Fest : die Autobiographie eines deutschen Verlegers" (A farewell party: the autobiography of a German publisher) describes how he was recruited for a short time.

After the German-Polish non-aggression pact concluded in 1934, Herrnstadt "turned his attention entirely to efforts to create a security alliance between Poland and Hitler's Germany."

=== Unemployment ===
By 1936, using the Editor's Law, the Reich Ministry of Public Enlightenment and Propaganda had removed many foreign Jewish correspondents and by that point only a few remained. Herrnstadt was one of them. On 12 March 1936, Herrnstadt left the Berliner Tageblatt when liberal editor-in-chief Paul Scheffler resigned from his post.

Although Moltke was politically sympathetic to Herrnstadt, he couldn't defend him as he was Jewish. From that point forward, he avoided all contact with him. Rudolf von Scheliha was of a different mettle and continued to maintain contact with Herrnstadt and the Stöbe, although their meetings were kept secret. Both Herrnstadt and von Scheliha had similar political views on the Nazis, however, they had different views on the Soviet Union as von Scheliha was opposed to communism. To convince him otherwise, Herrnstadt decided to persuade Von Scheliha to pass embassy reports by disguising the delivery location of the intelligence, i.e. to show they weren't going to the Soviet Union. In 1937, he travelled to England and through Communist International agent Ernest David Weiss and his sub-agent Ilse Steinfeld, a journalist for the Berliner Tageblatt who worked for The Guardian, he met the German legation councillor Hermann von Stutterheim (1887–1959) of the German embassy in London. (Note: Coppi and Kebir mistake the Romanian embassy for the German embassy in the text of Ilse Stöbe: Wieder im Amt in page 52 as Baron Von Stutterheim was a diplomat in the Germany embassy not the Romanian embassy, although refer to the German embassy further on in the text.) When he returned to Warsaw, he informed Von Scheliha that had met a contact in England, who was an "intermediary" for the secret service who was interested in the political situation in Poland. He further informed him that he was authorised to act for this intermediary. This finally convinced Von Scheliha by mid-September to begin supplying embassy reports. From November 1937 to August 1939, Herrnstadt supplied 211 intelligence report to the Soviet Union that were considered valuable. On 16 August 1939, Von Scheliha reported that an Invasion of Poland was to begin on 1 September 1939.

=== Exile in Moscow ===
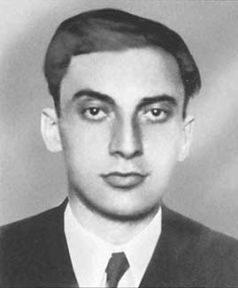
Herrnstadt c. 1930s

With the invasion of Poland by the Wehrmacht in 1939, Herrnstadt fled to the Soviet Union and came to reside in Moscow, where he applied and was accepted into the Communist Party of the Soviet Union. Despite criticism from some members of the German exile community for his "anti-revolutionary" views, Herrnstadt was among the members of the National Committee for a Free Germany (NKFD). He was briefly editor of the Das freie Wort, the newspaper of German prisoners of war in the Soviet Union.

At the beginning of June 1943, Herrnstadt and Alfred Kurella began writing a committee manifesto for the formation of the NKFD. This text "Manifest an die Wehrmacht und das deutsche Volk" (Manifesto to the Wehrmacht and the German People) praised historical figures from the Kingdom of Prussia who had allied with Imperial Russia against Napoleon in the German Campaign of 1813; figures such as Heinrich Friedrich Karl vom und zum Stein, Carl von Clausewitz and Graf Yorck were depicted as exemplary Germans. In 1943 when the NKFD formed, he began working as editor-in-chief on the weekly Freies Deutschland the newspaper of the NKFD. On 14 September he was elected member of the committee. According to a report by German political author and historian Wolfgang Leonhard, his "upper-class past" was evident, among other things, from the fact that while he was still working in the Soviet Union as chief editor of the Freies Deutschland newspaper, he attracted attention by addressing his subordinates using the formal "You".

When the Moscow-based KPD leadership established a special commission to prepare for the defeat and return to Germany, Herrnstadt was one of the committee members. Herrnstadt co-wrote the KPD guidelines for KPD functionaries working in Germany.

== Return to Germany ==
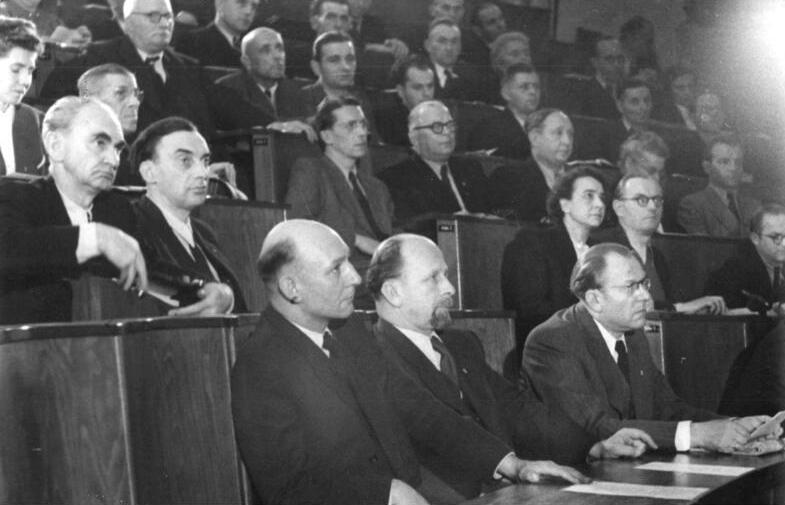
Herrnstadt (second row, second from left) at the first session of the Volkskammer, 1950

On 15 May 1945, Herrnstadt returned to Germany as a member of the Sobottka Group, which laid the groundwork for the Soviet Military Administration in Mecklenburg. He had instructions from the Red Army to create a new non-partisan newspaper. Herrnstadt was appointed to lead as editor-in-chief of the centre-left East German daily newspaper Berliner Zeitung, initially published the Soviet administration in the Soviet Zones but later becoming the organ of the Magistrate of Berlin. The first employees of the Red Army paper were the writers Helmut Kindler, the writer Gerhard Grindel and the photographer Eva Kemlein. On 21 May, the first version of the paper with headline "Berlin is alive!" was published, selling 100,000 copies. Over the next several weeks, Herrnstadt arranged for former journalists including Günther Kertzscher, Bernt von Kügelgen, Friedrich Rücker and Gerhard Dengler to join him at the paper. Gerhard Kegel became the deputy editor-in-chief. In August 1945, Herrnstaft founded the general Allgemeiner Deutscher Verlag publishing house with himself, Kegel and Friedrich Notz as managing directors. In the autumn of 1945, Herrnstadt bought the Theresienhof estate as a holiday home for German publishing employees. On 11 October, he founded the newspaper and magazine publishing house, Berliner Verlag that was under the control of the SED. Herrnstadt became the publishing director. Berlin Verlag took over publishing of the Berliner Zeitung. In January 1947, a printing works was started that was completed a year later. In a letter dated 2 October 1947, Herrnstadt stated the publishing houses employed 1700 people, but it wasn't the only publishing he developed. He also published the weekly contemporary magazine Neue Berliner Illustrierte beginning in October 1945, the women's magazine Die Frau von heute that began publication in February 1946, a youth magazine Start and the political magazine Demokratischer Aufbau.

=== Politics ===
On 18 November 1948, Herrnstadt published a controversial article in the Neues Deutschland titled "Über, die Russen' und über uns" ("About ‘the Russians’ and about Us") addressed to the membership of the SED, at the time consisting of some 1.8million people. Herrnstadt, an exemplary communist who believed that Germany society couldn't develop without the help of the Soviet Union, could no longer stand the comments made against the Soviet occupying force, and criticised German citizens who felt they had been mistreated or abused through rape in the closing months of the war. Although Herrnstadt was defending Russian forces, for the first time, the barabarism of the Red Army was openly discussed, in effect breaking the official silence on the subject, which was considered taboo, even under occupation law. Herrnstadt used a metaphor about a German girl who had her “bike stolen by a Soviet soldier", in effect had been raped, but defended the Russians by stating that Germans should "understand" such incidences The article was effectively promotional and called for the unconditional recognition of the leading role of the Soviet Union in Germany society. Widely read and discussed, it led to German protests and a public discussion between the Soviet Union and Germany on fascism, the end of the war and what happened. Possibly the only open discussion in East Germany When it was over, the Russians decided the topic wouldn't be discussed again and the crimes would be forgotten or repressed From June 1949 to July 1953, Herrnstadt was editor-in-chief of left-wing daily newspaper Neues Deutschland (New Germany) in East Berlin the central organ of the SED.

As editor-in-chief, he always allowed Neues Deutschland to follow the line laid down by Moscow. Even when this line took on anti-Semitic characteristics in connection with an alleged doctors' conspiracy in the Soviet Union, he did not deviate from it. For example, on 14 January 1953, Neues Deutschland published biting attacks against allegedly "demoralized bourgeois Jewish nationalists" - as Herrnstadt was of both upper middle-class and Jewish origin, he had to fear that this could soon also mean himself.

As a reflection of his standing within the party, Herrnstadt was elected to the Central Committee of the SED during the 3rd Party Congress in July 1950, a position he held until 1953. He was also a candidate for the Politburo of the SED.

=== SED Reforms ===
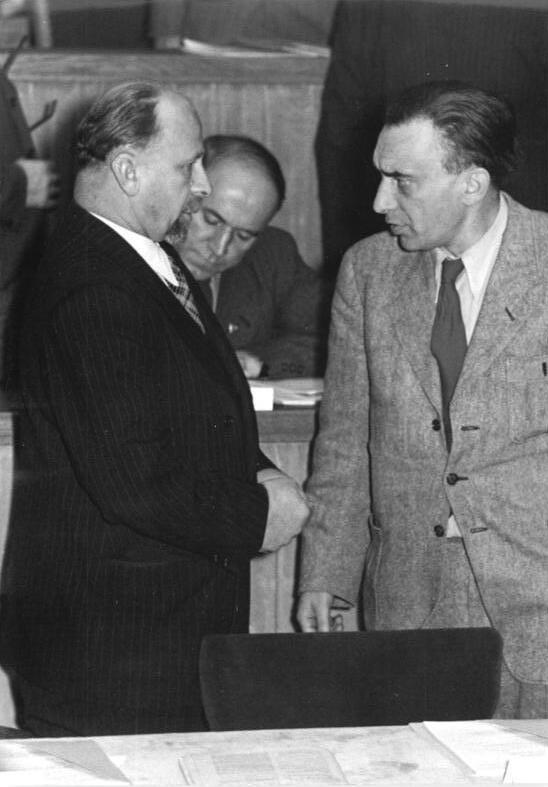
Walter Ulbricht (left) with Herrnstadt, 1951

After the death of Joseph Stalin on 5 March 1953, on 2 June, the Soviet Union ordered the SED to adopt the New Course, which was intended to reverse or slow down the construction of socialism in the GDR that had been pushed forward since 1952. Herrnstadt was initially skeptical about this course. When he complained to the new Soviet High Commissioner Vladimir Semyonov about the speed of the ordered change of course, the latter replied: "In 14 days you may no longer have a state." On the 9 June, within the Politburo, Herrnstadt now positioned himself together with the Minister for State Security Wilhelm Zaisser and leading party ideologist, as an opponent of Ulbricht. They had the Soviet secret service chief Lavrenti Beria on their side, who seemed to be the coming strong man of the Soviet Union after Stalin's death. On 14 June 1953, Herrnstadt published a report in Neues Deutschland under the title "It's time to put the sledgehammer aside" (Den Holzhammer beiseite legen). The authors critically examined the dictatorial methods used by the SED to decide on the increase in work standards at the VEB Wohnungsbau and to announce this for 30 June. Even if the article did not demand the withdrawal of the increase in standards, it nevertheless acted as a beacon, as it showed that the policies of the Central Committee General Secretary Walter Ulbricht were controversial even within the inner circles of power in the SED.

Herrnstadt became a member of a "commission of the Politburo to draw up proposals for organizational changes," in which he and Zaisser openly criticized the bureaucratic and dictatorial leadership style of Ulbricht and Hermann Matern, who as chairman of the Central Party Control Commission (ZPKK) was responsible for internal party discipline. Herrnstadt was also appointed to an editorial committee of the Politburo, which was to formulate the new course of the party line validly by the next meeting of the Central Committee. The Soviet ambassador in East Berlin, Ivan Ilyichov, asked him to join Zaisser in calling on Ulbricht to step down from power: "He is a sensible man, he will understand that. Well, and if he doesn't want to understand, then tell us and we will take action."

On 16 June 1953, the Central Committee approved the New Course, which Herrnstadt helped to formulate:

"It is about creating a German Democratic Republic that will find the approval of all honest Germans for its prosperity, its social justice, its legal security, its deeply national characteristics and its liberal atmosphere."

Only in this way could German unity be restored. How serious Herrnstadt was about this is disputed in research: Klaus Schroeder did not believe that he and Zaisser wanted to question the leading role of the SED. Wilfried Loth, on the other hand, saw the declaration as an indication that the Soviet Union "did not want the GDR" and - as in the Stalin notes of 1952 - would have preferred a neutral, democratic, united Germany.

=== Against Walter Ulbricht ===
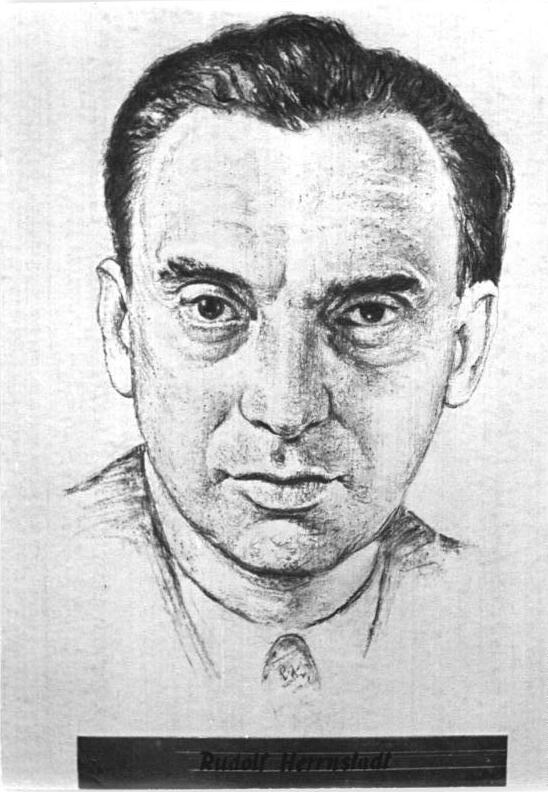
A sketch of Herrnstadt, 1952

However, because the increase in standards was not withdrawn, the New Course was no longer able to stop the 1953 East German Uprising of 17 June 1953, which initially weakened Ulbricht's position in the SED and the Soviet Union. After the suppression by troops of the Group of Soviet Forces in Germany, Herrnstadt and Zaisser continued their work on dismantling Ulbricht position. On 26 June, the Organizing Commission drew up a new leadership concept for the party: instead of the all-powerful General Secretary at the top, there was to be a collective leadership. To facilitate the change, Zaisser issued a Politburo motion to replace Ulbricht with Herrnstadt as SED First Secretary. At Herrnstadt's request, Ulbricht was prepared to relinquish the party leadership. On the night of 7–8 July 1953, Herrnstadt presented the commission's proposals to the Politburo. Zaisser, Friedrich Ebert Jr., Heinrich Rau and Elli Schmidt agreed with him; only Matern and Erich Honecker spoke in favor of Ulbricht.

Ulbricht accused Herrnstadt of “factionalism” and “social democratism” - both of which had been considered a serious breach of party discipline since the SED had transformed itself into a new type of party in 1948–49. However, Ulbricht again declared his willingness to resign: “All right, if everyone sees it that way, please, I'm not clinging to the post.” However, the Politburo did not make a formal decision to dismiss him.

Walter Ulbricht was summoned for a visit to Moscow with the new Soviet leadership the following day. He was criticized for his introduction of collective farms and a slower course towards socialist construction. However, the situation reversed after Nikita Khrushchev, the Secretary of the Central Committee of the Communist Party of the Soviet Union, consolidated power over the Soviet government in Moscow and purged Ulbricht's opponent Lavrentiy Beria when he was arrested on 26 June. Khrushchev and Prime Minister Georgi Malenkov supported Ulbricht. With their backing, Ulbricht appeared before the Central Committee Plenum of the SED on 24 July 1953 and presented a text that had not been agreed with the Politburo. He presented the New Course as the cause of the “fascist putsch” (the official GDR term for the uprising of 17 June 1953) and attacked Herrnstadt, whom he accused of “directly supporting the strikers”. He constructed a direct link between the “Herrnstadt-Zaisser faction” and the ousted Beria, whose allegedly “capitulatory attitude [...] must have led to the restoration of capitalism.” The other Politburo members therefore did not dare to protest, and the other CC members considered the text to have been agreed. Herrnstadt's dissension against the course of the Ulbricht faction was also criticized by Soviet adviser Vladimir Semyonov, who answered Herrnstadt's attack by replying that "in two weeks you may no longer have a state."

After the plenary session, a journalistic campaign orchestrated by Ulbricht's collaborator Karl Schirdewan began against Herrnstadt and Zaisser, who were publicly described as “Trotskyists” and “enemies of the German people and the party of the working class”. Like other opponents of Ulbricht, Herrnstadt lost his seats in the Politburo and Central Committee on 26 July 1953 for “anti-party factionalism”. In the same year, he also lost his position as editor-in-chief of Neues Deutschland. Herrnstadt admitted all the accusations made against him and criticized himself to the ZPKK. The SED expelled Herrnstadt on 23 January 1954.

== Central archives ==
On 1 October 1953, Herrnstadt took over management of the Central Archives in Merseburg. While there he wrote two books. The first of these on the Cologne Communist Trial “Die Verschwörung gegen das internationale Proletariat” ("The Conspiracy Against the International Proletariat") that was published in 1958. He published a further book published in 1965, "Die Entdeckung der Klassen. Die Geschichte des Begriffs Klasse von den Anfängen bis zum Vorabend der Pariser Julirevolution 1830" ("The Discovery of Classes: The History of the Concept of Class from its Beginnings to the Eve of the July Revolution in Paris in 1830"). Throughout his later life, he continued to mold himself to the changing requirements of communism.

== Death ==
Herrnstadt died on 28 August 1966.

== Rehabilitation ==
In 1961, the SED offered Herrnstadt readmission to the party on the condition that he remained silent. However, after the public slander to which he had been subjected, he insisted on being rehabilitated. Herrnstadt therefore refused to rejoin the SED. On 29 November 1989, 23 years after his death, the ZPKK under Werner Eberlein rehabilitated Herrnstadt in the course of the peaceful revolution in the GDR.

== Publications ==
- Herrnstadt, Rudolf (1958). Die Verschwörung gegen das internationale Proletariat (in German). Berlin: Rütten & Loening. OCLC 1284385416.
- Herrnstadt, Rudolf (1965). Die Entdeckung der Klassen: die Geschichte des Begriffs Klasse von den Anfängen bis zum Vorabend der Pariser Julirevolution 1830. Berlin: Deutscher Verlag der Wissenschaften.
