= Lieselotte Thoms-Heinrich =

Lieselotte Thoms-Heinrich (born Lieselotte Lehmann; 29 October 1920 – 14 July 1992) was a journalist and officially mandated feminist. Between 1968 and 1981 she was editor in chief of the mass circulation women's magazine, "Für Dich". She was also a member of the national parliament ("Volkskammer") between 1963 and 1981.

== Life and career ==
Lieselotte Lehmann was born in Berlin. Her father worked as a clerk. She left school when she was around 16, and trained between 1937 and 1939 for office work and typing. She then worked as a typist between 1939 and 1945, which was the period covered by the Second World War.

After the war, with a large part of what had been central Germany now administered as the Soviet occupation zone, she undertook an unpaid internship with the weekly newspaper "Sonntag", later working, till 1949, as a contributing editor for it. In 1949 she switched to the daily newspaper Neues Deutschland, which in October of that year became the official newspaper of the East German ruling party. She started as a contributing editor, later heading up the paper's "National Administration department" ("Abteilung Staatliche Verwaltung"). During this period, in July 1953, she was on the receiving end of an official reprimand from the National Party Control Commission ("Zentrale Parteikontrollkommission") because of an interview with Max Fechner which was published on 30 June 1953. In the interview Fechner had voiced his opposition to the prosecution of workers who had taken part in the 17 June strike. Fechner was locked up and denounced as an "enemy of the state and the party": his career did not survive the incident. Thoms-Heinrich's did, however, and in due course she became a chief reporter with Neues Deutschland, also joining the newspaper's "editorial college".

She sat on the central board of the German Press Association for over 30 years.

In parallel with her journalism, Thoms-Heinrich studied both at the Academy for national and civil law at Potsdam and at the specialist Journalists' Academy in Leipzig. In 1968 she switched to the country's best known women's magazine, "Für Dich", where she worked as editor in chief in succession to Yvonne Freyer, remaining in post until her retirement, probably in 1981.

After 1981 Lieselotte Thoms-Heinrich continued to work for the party central committee's Marxism-Leninism institute, also remaining active as a freelance journalist and publishing several books.

== Politics ==
There is no indication that Lieselotte Thoms-Heinrich was politically active before 1945. In 1947 she became a member of the Socialist Unity Party (Sozialistische Einheitspartei Deutschlands / SED) which had been created under controversial circumstances in April of the previous year. In 1963 she stood for election to the national legislative assembly ("Volkskammer") and was duly elected. In accordance with the leninist precepts of the East German Constitution, in the Volkskammer she represented not a political party but the Democratic Women's League (Demokratischer Frauenbund Deutschlands / DFD), one of several approved mass organisations mandated to send members to the Volkskammer according to a predetermined quota. She continued to represent the DFD in the national legislature till 1981. Within the assembly, in 1971 she became a member of the parliamentary committee for Foreign Affairs.

With her appointment as editor in chief at "Für Dich", Thoms-Heinrich's political importance increased further. In 1968 she was appointed a member of the Politburo Women's Commission. The next year members of the DFD voted her onto the executive and presidium of their organisation. She retained these offices until the demise of the régime in 1989.

== Books ==
Thoms-Heinrich's books include;

- You with us: a photo report from the Demokrat Republik (with Jochen Weyer) (1974)
- Stations of the Cross Ravensbrück : Biographies of anti-fascist resistance fighters (with Sigrid Jacobeit) (1987)

== Awards and honours ==
- 1980 Patriotic Order of Merit in gold
- 1985 Patriotic Order of Merit gold clasp

== Personal ==
Lieselotte Thoms-Heinrich was married to the senior journalist and trades union officer, Eberhard Heinrich.
