= Sigrid Jacobeit =

Sigrid Jacobeit (née Dorow; born 29 January 1940) is a German ethnographer and ethnologist and agricultural scientist. She was director of the Ravensbrück Concentration Camp Memorial of the Brandenburg Memorials Foundation from 1992 to 2005.

== Life and research ==
Jacobeit was born on 29 January 1940 in Johannismühle near Baruth/Mark. After graduating from high school in Luckenwalde in 1958, she began studying agriculture at Humboldt University in East Berlin (1959–1965). In 1971, Jacobeit took over the management of the Museum of Agricultural Productive Forces in Wandlitz from Walter Blankenburg, which she ran until 1980. At the same time, she completed a correspondence course in ethnography/history at the Humboldt University (1971–1975). In 1979 she completed her doctorate on Working and Living Conditions of Small and Medium-Sized Women Farmers in the Nazi Era. After working as a freelance author from 1980 to 1985, she taught from 1986 to 1991 as a research assistant and senior assistant at the Institute for Ethnography at the Humboldt University. In 1990 she habilitated as Dr. sc. phil. at the Humboldt University. The title of her dissertation is: Die Grundbedürfnisse Ernährung und Kleidung im Alltag des deutschen Volkes zwischen 1800 und 1945.

After the fall of the Berlin Wall, university life changed fundamentally. This led to new appointments to the chairs and ended her teaching activities at the university. From 1991, she received teaching assignments at Technische Universität Berlin and Free University of Berlin. She has also taught at the universities in Luxembourg, Jena, Novosibirsk, Zurich and TU Dortmund University. She has given numerous lectures and interviews in Germany and abroad, as well as in the United States. In 2002, she was appointed honorary professor by Humboldt University and continues her academic work to this day.

In collaboration with her husband, the chronicler, historian and ethnologist Wolfgang Jacobeit, she wrote and published three volumes of the Illustrated Everyday History of the German People between 1986 and 1995, an autobiographical work about Wolfgang Stegemann and other works. She researched women's history in general, compiled biographies on women in the resistance before and during National Socialism and wrote a study on the Osram workers in war production during World War II. In 1987, she and Liselotte Thomas-Heinrich published their joint work Kreuzweg Ravensbrück - Lebensbilder antifaschistischer Widerstandskämpferinnen.

Jacobeit co-founded the Interdisciplinary Women's Research Group Ravensbrück Memorial - FU Berlin (IFFG), which was awarded the Margherita von Brentano Prize in 1997. Through close cooperation between the Ravensbrück Memorial and the Free University of Berlin, the IFFG has created important conditions for research and teaching about the Ravensbrück women's concentration camp in various academic fields. At the time of the award ceremony, Birgit Bosold, Elisabeth Böhmer, Insa Eschebach, Ursula Fuhrich-Grubert, Johanna Kootz, Irmela von der Lühe and Claudia Ulbrich were are part of this group. In 1997, the IFFG research project Victims and survivors. Jewish Women Prisoners in Ravensbrück Concentration Camp during and after World War II was presented. This project was carried out in cooperation with the University of Tel Aviv until December 1999. 7]

Sigrid Jacobeit is a founding member and former chairwoman of the Folklore Section of the Gesellschaft für Ethnographie e. V. . In 2007, together with Henry Tesch, she founded the International Summerschool at Gymnasium Carolinum in Neustrelitz with the support of Eike Benzin, teacher at the Carolinum, and Ulrich Meßner, director of the Müritz National Park.

=== Ravensbrück Memorial ===
Sigrid Jacobeit took office as director of the Ravensbrück Memorial, the largest women's concentration camp in the German Reich between 1939 and 1945, in December 1992. She had previously been deputy director of the Museum of Labor in Hamburg from 1991 to 1992. Jacobeit facilitated the reorientation and extensive redesign of the memorial site in cooperation with those responsible in the state of Brandenburg. She was also a member of the International Ravensbrück Committee. She succeeded in establishing personal connections with survivors of the Ravensbrück women's, men's and youth concentration camp from numerous European countries and internationally, and in an intensive exchange of ideas, she learned about their ideas for the redesign and further development of the memorial. Jacobeit retired at the end of May 2005. Her successor as director of the Ravensbrück Memorial was Insa Eschebach.

The Ravensbrück Summer University was jointly launched in 2005 by Sigrid Jacobeit and the historian Stefan Hördler with the support of Johanna Wanka, Brandenburg's Minister of Science, Research and Culture at the time. The Summer University took place for the first time in 2005 and was developed into the European Summer University by Insa Eschebach.
