= Herta Geffke =

German activist and politician (1893–1974)

Herta Geffke (married name, Herta Kaasch: 19 August 1893 – 29 December 1974) was a German activist and politician (KPD, SED) who resisted Nazism. After 1945 she became a member of the Central Party Control Commission of the SED (Zentrale Parteikontrollkommission / ZPKK) in the Soviet occupation zone (from 1949 the German Democratic Republic), identified as a "true Stalinist" and feared on account of her interrogation methods.

== Life ==
=== Family provenance and early years ===
The eldest of her parents' six recorded children, Herta Geffke was born in Bollinken (Frauendorf) on the north side of Stettin, at that time in Pomerania. Her father was a shoe maker: her mother worked as a washer-woman. Her younger brother, Hans Geffke, (1903–1985), would later achieve some notability as a Communist Party activist and, after his return from the Soviet Union in 1949, as a senior party official in the German Democratic Republic. On leaving school Herta Geffke herself went into domestic service, later moving on to become a print worker.

She joined the Young Socialists (Sozialistische Arbeiter-Jugend) (SAJ) in 1908. In 1912, the year of her nineteenth birthday, she became a member of the [[Social Democratic Party of Germany|Social Democratic Party ("Sozialdemokratische Partei Deutschlands" / SPD)]]. Two years later, in July 1914, war broke out. The party leadership concluded what amounted to a political truce for the duration of the war, which provoked vehement dissent among the party membership. In 1917 the party finally broke apart, primarily because of differences over whether to continue voting funds for the war in the Reichstag: Geffke was one of those who chose the anti-war breakaway faction, identified as the Independent Social Democratic Party of Germany ("Unabhängige Sozialdemokratische Partei Deutschlands" / USPD). In 1918 she was a member of the party regional leadership ("Bezirksleitung") for Stettin, and during the revolutionary months that followed the end of the war she was a member locally of the Workers' and Soldiers' Soviet ("council"). When the USPD itself broke apart at the end of 1920 she was part of the leftwing majority that switched to the newly formed Communist Party of Germany, becoming a full-time regional party secretary for Pomerania.

=== Activism and politics in Weimar Germany ===
In March 1921 the party appointed her regional "women's secretary" for the politically and economically important Lower Rhine and Ruhr districts in the west of the country. Four months later, in July 1921, she was a delegate at the third world congress of the Communist International and the second international Women's Congress, both held in Moscow. Later in 1921, as the result of a by-election in Silesia (at that time part of Prussia), she was elected a member of the Prussian legislative assembly ("Preußischer Landtag"). She remained a member, representing the Communist Party, till 1924.

In 1922 Herta Geffke married Wienand Kaasch, a party functionary. The marriage lasted until 1928. As a party moderate at a time when Staliinist extremists were increasingly in the ascendant within the party, she did not stand for re-election to the Landtag in the regional elections of December 1924. Over the next few years, living with her husband, she was employed in a succession of relatively low profile party jobs. She worked for the party leadership in the Berlin district of Neukölln until the end of 1928. After her marriage broke up in 1928 there were further political differences with party comrades and she offered her services to "Red Aid", the Communist-sponsored international welfare organisation. In this capacity she ran a children's home in Worpswede (north of Bremen) and then another, far to the south, at Elgersburg until it was forced to close through lack of funds. After this she worked as a regional party secretary in the Saar region, an area of Germany with an ambiguous status and still, at this stage, occupied by the French army. She was very soon moved to a job with the regional party leadership ("Bezirksleitung") in the Ruhr district and during 1931/32, worked as regional secretary for "Red Aid" in the large Baden-Palatinate region. In 1933 she became a member of the Central Executive of "Red Aid".

=== Twelve Nazi years ===
The political backdrop was transformed in January 1933 when the Nazi Party took power in Germany and lost little time in converting the country into a one-party dictatorship. Herta Geffke continued to pursue her (now illegal) political activities, working for "Red Aid" in the Hessen-Frankfurt region from March 1933 and in the Ruhr district further to the north. It was in Essen in the Ruhr district that she was arrested on 11 or 13 September 1933. She was held for the next six months in "protective custody".

On 5 March 1934 the district high court in Hamm sentenced her to a thirty-month jail term for "preparing to commit high treason" ("Vorbereitung zum Hochverrat"). She was then imprisoned successively in the Justizvollzugsanstalt Schwalmstadt women's prison at Ziegenhain (Schwalmstadt) (south of Kassel) and at Jauer (west of Breslau). She was released in October 1936, and trained to work in a (men's) barber's shop. During the ensuing Nazi years she worked as a hair dresser in Stettin and as a seamstress. It is reported that she resumed her illegal work for the Communist party, although details of what this involved are sparse. During 1943/44 she was a member of the resistance group around Werner Krause and Walter Empacher in the Stettin region.

=== Soviet occupation zone ===
War ended, and with it the Nazi régime, in May 1945. On 3 May 1945, Herta Geffke came into contact with Gustav Sobottka, who had spent the war years in Moscow and was now a leading member of the so-called Ulbricht Group, comprising trusted German exiles hurriedly flown in from Moscow to fill the power vacuum arising from the military defeat in Germany of the Nazi government. Following the meeting with Sobottka, Geffke was mandated to head up the antifascist school in Stettin-Krekow. This one of several such institutions established in 1945, briefly, in different parts of Germany under the auspices of the Soviet sponsored National Committee for a Free Germany ("Nationalkomitee Freies Deutschland" / NKFD). She quickly joined Sobottka's "Initiative Group", becoming a member of the Communist Party regional leadership and secretariat in June 1945.

Between June 1945 and March 1946, she was in charge of the regional youth department (Landesjugendamt for the newly (and at this point temporarily) created state of Mecklenburg-Vorpommern. In 1946 she became a member of the executive of the Mecklenburg advisory assembly ("Beratenden Versammlung"), a precursor of the Mecklenburg-Vorpommern regional legislature (1946–1952) ("Landtag") of which she was a member between October 1946 and October 1950, serving as a deputy vice-president of the assembly. (Following the abolition of the regional tier of government in 1952, both the state of Mecklenburg-Vorpommern and its "Landtag" would be abolished for administrative purposes, although both were revived in 1990.)

Alongside her role in the regional parliament, she held important party responsibilities. From April 1946 she served as regional women's secretary for the Mecklenburg Party Executive. Following the controversial creation that month of the Socialist Unity Party ("Sozialistische Einheitspartei Deutschlands" / SED) she was one of many thousands who had lost no time in signing their Communist Party membership across to what now evolved into the ruling party for a new kind of one-party dictatorship. From 1947 she became a member of the regional party secretariat for Brandenburg. During 1947/48 she was also a member of the national executive of the politically important Confederation of Antifascists ("Bund der Antifaschistinnen und Antifaschisten" /BdA).

On the national stage within the Soviet occupation zone, from March 1948 to May 1949, Geffke was a member of the People's Council ("Deutscher Volksrat"), an appointed chamber mandated to develop and endorse the proposed constitution drawn up by the SED (party). In May 1949 the assembly declared itself to be a "provisional parliament", and following the general election of October 1950 (in which, reassuringly, more than 99% of the electorate endorsed the ruling party's candidate list), it did indeed become the national parliament ("Volkskammer"). Herta Geffke was never a candidate nor a member of the Volkskammer, however.

=== German Democratic Republic ===
In October 1949 the part of Germany administered since May 1945 as the Soviet occupation zone was relaunched as the Soviet sponsored German Democratic Republic, a separated German state with its political institutions consciously modelled on those of the Soviet Union itself. Under the Leninist system, the state's power was focused not on any parliament or government ministers, but on the ruling party, and within the party (except when a party congress was in session) on the party central committee. Right from the birth of the state in 1949 Herta Geffke was active as an energetic official inside the party central committee. In March 1949 she became a department head in the Central Secretariat if the Party Executive and a member of the newly instituted Central Party Control Commission ("Zentrale Parteikontrollkommission" / ZPKK), retaining this membership till October 1958. This meant that, working alongside Hermann Matern, she was responsible for keeping the party cleansed "of enemy and degenerate elements" ("von feindlichen und entarteten Elementen") during the 1950s.

A specific investigation which she headed up, and which quickly acquired fame and/or notoriety, was the special ZPKK commission, starting in November 1949, to check out the contacts of party members with the US born spy Noel Field. Between 1954 and 1958 she served as deputy chair of the ZPKK. One source describes her in the role as "the archetypal harsh and uncompromising Stalinist functionary" ("der Prototyp einer bedingungslosen und harten stalinistischen Funktionärin"). Contemporaries who encountered her during the course of the Noel Field investigations recall interrogation sessions lasting many hours, conducted without signs of any significant emotional engagement.

Following the 1956 Party Congress in Moscow, at which Comrade Kruschev's so-called "secret" speech greatly alarmed the Stalinist traditionalists who controlled East Germany, Herta Geffke and her Zentrale Parteikontrollkommission (party commission) were responsible for a large number of party resolutions and retributive actions that some forty years later (after the changes of 1989/90) would trigger judicial rehabilitation decisions.

In October 1958, the year of her sixty-fifth birthday, she was removed from the ZPKK and took on the top job in the personnel department ("Kaderabteilung") at the party central committee's Akademie für Gesellschaftswissenschaften beim ZK der SED (Institute for Social Sciences). She held this post till her retirement in June 1962.

Herta Geffke died in East Berlin on 29 December 1974.

== Awards and honours (not a complete list) ==
- 1955 Order of Karl Marx
- 1968 Patriotic Order of Merit in gold
- In 1973 a secondary school in the Berlin quarter of Johannisthal was named after her.
