= Erich Mückenberger =

East German politician (1910–1998)

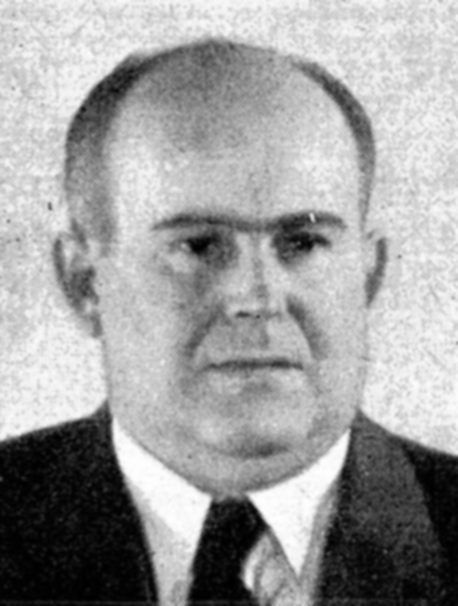
- Mückenberger c. 1954

Chairman of the Central Party Control Commission
- In office 19 June 1971 – 8 November 1989
- General Secretary: Erich Honecker; Egon Krenz
- Deputy: Heinz Juch; Werner Müller
- Preceded by: Hermann Matern
- Succeeded by: Werner Eberlein

Leader of the Socialist Unity Party in the Volkskammer
- In office December 1979 – 11 November 1989
- General Secretary: Erich Honecker
- Preceded by: Friedrich Ebert Jr.
- Succeeded by: Werner Jarowinsky

First Secretary of the Socialist Unity Party in Bezirk Frankfurt
- In office 2 August 1961 – 22 May 1971
- Second Secretary: Rudolf Held; Rudolf Leppin; Heinz Vogel; Hans-Joachim Hertwig
- Preceded by: Eduard Götzl
- Succeeded by: Hans-Joachim Hertwig

Secretary for Agriculture of the Central Committee Secretariat
- In office 26 July 1953 – 2 August 1961
- First Secretary: Walter Ulbricht
- Preceded by: Paul Merker (1950)
- Succeeded by: Gerhard Grüneberg

First Secretary of the Socialist Unity Party in Bezirk Erfurt
- In office 26 July 1952 – 26 July 1953
- Second Secretary: Ludwig Einicke
- Preceded by: Position established
- Succeeded by: Hans Kiefert

First Secretary of the Socialist Unity Party in Thuringia
- In office 16 December 1949 – 26 July 1952
- Second Secretary: Otto Funke
- Preceded by: Erich Kops (as Chairman)
- Succeeded by: Position abolished

First Secretary of the Socialist Unity Party in Saxony
- In office 4 December 1948 – 9 December 1949 Serving with Ernst Lohagen
- Preceded by: Otto Buchwitz; Wilhelm Koenen
- Succeeded by: Ernst Lohagen
Volkskammer
Member of the Volkskammer for Schwerin-Stadt, Schwerin-Land, Gadebusch, Sternberg
In office 8 November 1950 – 16 November 1989
Preceded by	Multi-member district
Succeeded by	Manfred Voigt

Personal details
- Born: 8 June 1910 Chemnitz, Kingdom of Saxony, German Empire
- Died: 10 February 1998 (aged 87) Berlin, Germany
- Party: KPD (1927–1946); SED (1946–1989); PDS (1989–1990)
- Education: Party Academy Karl Marx; Parteihochschule der KPdSU
- Occupation: Politician; Civil Servant; Weaver; Locksmith
- Awards: Patriotic Order of Merit; Order of Karl Marx
- Central institution membership: 1958–1989: Full member, Politburo of the Central Committee; 1950–1958: Candidate member, Politburo of the Central Committee; 1950–1989: Full member, Central Committee; Other offices held: 1978–1989: President, Society for German–Soviet Friendship

Erich Mückenberger (8 June 1910 – 10 February 1998) was a German socialist politician. He began his political career in the Social Democratic Party of Germany (SPD). He became a member of the Socialist Unity Party of Germany (SED) when the East German branches of SPD and the Communist Party of Germany merged after the Second World War. Mückenberger was one of the most high-ranking former Social Democrats in the German Democratic Republic and held several positions in the SED.

== Early life and political activism ==
Mückenberger spent his childhood in Chemnitz. He later worked there as a machine-fitter apprentice. In 1924 he joined the Social Democratic youth organization. In 1927 he became a SPD member. Mückenberger became an activist of its paramilitary wing, Reichsbanner. After the National Socialist takeover, he engaged in underground resistance against the new regime. In 1935 he was arrested and sent to the Sachsenhausen concentration camp. He was released after several months. In 1938 he was again arrested and was put in jail for ten months. In 1942 he was drafted to the German military and sent to the frontline. He was an English prisoner of war from April to August 1945.

== Political career in the GDR ==
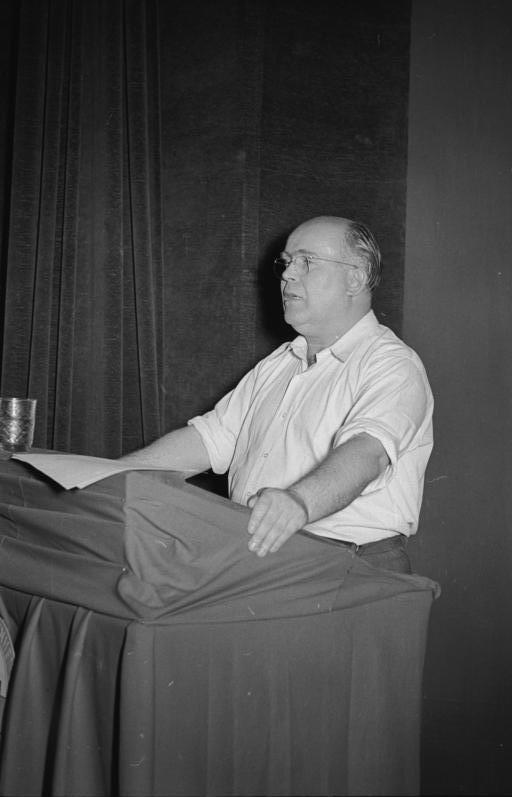
Mückenberger gives a speech at an SED meeting in Erfurt, 29 July 1953

After returning home in 1945, Mückenberger again became active in the SPD. Through the merger of SPD and KPD in the Soviet Occupation Zone, Mückenberger became a SED member. He became First Secretary of the SED Party District Organization in Saxony in 1948. Mückenberger then served as First Secretary of the Thuringia Party District Organization of SED 1949–1952. As the Thuringia District was divided along the geographic reorganization of the German Democratic Republic, Mückenberger became First Secretary of the Erfurt Party District Organization (one of the districts created out of the Thuringia organization). He remained as the First Secretary of the Erfurt SED District until 1953.

Mückenberger became a candidate member of the politburo of SED in 1950. He was one of four former SPD members that were represented in the SED politburo. In July 1953 he was included in the Central Committee secretariat. He remained in the CC secretariat until January 1963. He became a full politburo member in July 1958.

Mückenberger became First Secretary of the Frankfurt/Oder Party District Organization of SED in 1961. He stepped down in 1971 and was replaced by the then Second Secretary Hans-Joachim Hertwig. In the same year, he was appointed as the Chairman of the influential SED Central Control Commission, the party organ regulating party memberships. In 1978, he was elected chairman of the German-Soviet Friendship Society. In 1980, he was elected as the head of the SED parliamentary group in the Volkskammer (the national parliament of the GDR). Mückenberger remained in the SED politburo until November 1989.

During his political life, Erich Mückenberger participated as a speaker in the remembrance events for the liberation of the Buchenwald concentration camp at the National Memorial of the GDR.

== Later life ==
Mückenberger was expelled from the Socialist Unity Party of Germany/Party of Democratic Socialism (SED-PDS) on 21 November 1990. Following the German reunification, Mückenberger was put on trial for shootings at the Berlin Wall, a process that Mückenberger himself dubbed as 'victors' justice'. Mückenberger was allowed to withdraw from the trial in 1996, due to ill health.

== Works ==
- Die politische Massenarbeit im Dorf und die nächsten Aufgaben der Landwirtschaft. Berlin 1954.
- Kommunisten werden im Kampf erzogen. Berlin 1980.
- Der Menschheit ein Leben in Frieden. Ausgewählte Reden und Aufsätze, Berlin 1985.
