= Central Party Control Commission of the Socialist Unity Party of Germany =

The Central Party Control Commission (German: Zentrale Parteikontrollkommission) (ZPKK) was a supreme disciplinary body created by the SED (Socialist Unity Party of Germany) on 16 September 1948, in the Soviet Occupation Zone. It operated under the SED Central Committee and had corresponding bodies at all levels of the party in the form of Bezirk (BPKK) and district Party Control Commissions (KPKK). These entities existed until the renaming of the SED in 1989.

This commission played a significant role in enforcing conformity and eliminating perceived opposition within the party ranks during its existence.

== History ==
In the SED, as in other socialist parties in Eastern Bloc countries, the first purges were initiated by Stalinist cadres.

In the course of Stalinization of the SED, its Party Executive Committee (PV) decided in September 1948 to establish a Central Party Control Commission (ZPKK) following the Soviet model. The formal basis was a decision by the SED Party Executive Committee on 29 July 1948, titled "For the Organizational Consolidation of the Party and for its Purging of Hostile and Degenerate Elements." Party members whose attitudes or backgrounds did not align with the leadership had to appear before their respective ZPKK.

The Central Auditing Commission (German: Zentrale Revisionskommission) (ZRK) was created in 1950 to inspect the party finances analogous to the CPSU Central Auditing Commission, though due to its limited jurisdiction, its practical significance was minor compared to the ZPKK.

In July 1950, the III. Party Congress of the SED eliminated the equal representation between former Social Democrats and former Communists in central party functions. As a result, Otto Buchwitz, a former Social Democrat, had to step down from chairing the ZPPK in 1950.

Over the following years until around 1953, many long-standing members of the labor movement were purged, often through fabricated accusations. Charges included "Social Democratic tendencies", "Titoism", "Trotskyism", previous involvement in the KPDO, or simply having been a "Western emigrant" or having had any form of contact with the US diplomat Noel Field. Many of the proceedings resulted in forced self-criticisms, demotions, dismissals, and, in some cases, imprisonment.

=== Peaceful Revolution ===
During the Wende in late 1989, the SED renamed itself to SED-PDS and declared the "irrevocable break with Stalinism as a system" at an extraordinary party conference. The ZPKK, which had collectively resigned on 3 December 1989, was abolished and replaced by a Central Arbitration Commission (German: Zentrale Schiedskommission).

The Central Arbitration Commission, chaired by Günther Wieland, a former prosecutor in the GDR's Public Prosecutor General's Office, continued the work of the late ZPKK, rehabilitating ZPKK victims and expelling SED elites, notably expelling all longtime full and candidate members of the SED Politburo on 20 and 21 January 1990 except for Werner Eberlein and Siegfried Lorenz.

== Structure ==
=== Subordinate bodies ===
The ZPKK had subordinate bodies: the Bezirk (or, until the administrative reform in 1952, the state-level party control commissions) and the district-level party control commissions of the SED. The SED also had so-called functional district organisations in large universities, ministries such as the Ministry for State Security and other institutions, and these also had party control commissions. The chairman of these were always part of the respective party leadership. These bodies were bound by the directives of the ZPKK and were obligated to report to it.

=== Composition ===
Initially, the ZPKK comprised nine full-time members and three volunteer candidate members. After the XI. Party Congress in April 1986, the ZPKK consisted of the chairman, eight full members, and six candidate members. The full and candidate members of the ZPKK were appointed throughout its existence by the elected PV and later the Central Committee of the SED.

=== Leadership ===
The ZPKK was initially chaired in parity by former Social Democrat Otto Buchwitz and former Communist Hermann Matern. The III. Party Congress of the SED in July 1950 eliminated the parity between former Social Democrats and former Communists in central party functions. Former Social Democrats were pushed out of party functions and Buchwitz had to step down. Matern led the ZPKK alone until his death in January 1971. Erich Mückenberger succeeded him in June, serving until his retirement in November 1989, when Werner Eberlein was elected. Though in office for less than a month until the collective resignation of the Central Committee, the Central Party Control Commission made numerous crucial decisions in that time, among other things expelling Erich Honecker and Günter Mittag while rehabilitating Robert Havemann and Rudolf Herrnstadt.

The chairman of the ZPKK was a powerful figure in party politics, and usually was a full member of the Politburo of the Central Committee of the SED.

Period	Chairman
29 November 1948 — 24 July 1950	Otto Buchwitz
21 October 1948 — 24 January 1971†	Hermann Matern
19 June 1971 — 8 November 1989	Erich Mückenberger
8 November 1989 — 3 December 1989	Werner Eberlein

The chairman was assisted by a deputy chairman, notably Herta Geffke (1954–1958), particularly tasked with uncovering connections between German emigrants and Noel Field, Heinz Juch (1971–1986) and Werner Müller (1986–1989).

== Mission ==
The ZPKK was responsible, among other things, for expelling individuals from the party and imposing various party penalties such as reprimands or severe reprimands. Its role was to oversee the "unity and purity" of the party. The ZPKK closely collaborated with governmental entities, including the Ministry for State Security, the Attorney General, the Central Commission for State Control (German: Zentrale Kommission für Staatliche Kontrolle) (ZKSK), and the Main Administration of the Volkspolizei (HVDP). Investigation outcomes had to be presented to the Secretariat of the SED Central Committee for decision-making.

It also had the authority to posthumously rehabilitate individuals, examples being Felix Halle, executed during Stalin's purges in 1937, and Robert Havemann, expelled from the Academy of Sciences of the GDR in 1966.
