= Admiralspalast =

Theatre and event venue in Berlin, Germany

Coordinates: 52°31′15″N 13°23′19″E

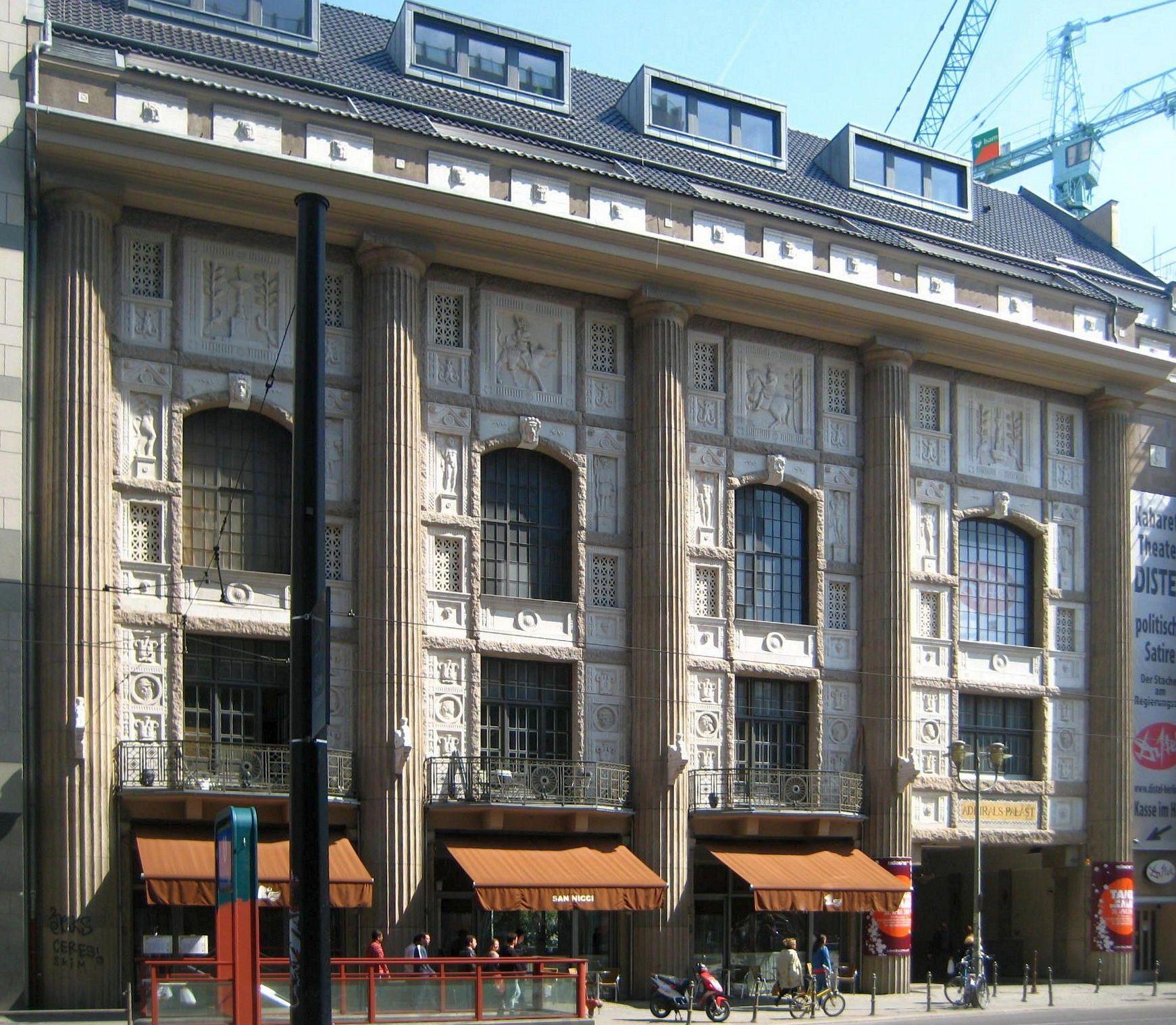
Facade of the Admiralspalast

The Admiralspalast (German for admiral palace) is a theatre on Friedrichstraße in the Mitte district of Berlin, Germany. The theatre has 1,756 seats. It opened in 1910, built as part of a large leisure complex on the former site of the 1873 Admiralsgarten bath house. It is one of the city's few preserved pre-World War II era variety venues.

== History ==
As a place of amusement, the Admiralspalast originally included a skating rink, a public bath, bowling alleys, a café and a cinema open day and night. After World War I it changed to a revue theatre, starting with the show Drunter und drüber by Walter Kollo, later continued by the performance of operettas.

As the building suffered little damage from the World War II bombing, it was home to the Berlin State Opera until the reconstruction of the Berlin State Opera House in 1955. On April 21–22, 1946, the Social Democratic Party of Germany and the Communist Party of Germany in the Soviet occupation zone held a convention at the Admiralspalast where they merged to become the Socialist Unity Party of Germany. The GDR Union of Journalists had its offices inside the Admiralspalast.

The performance of revues and operettas was continued under the name of Metropol-Theater (Berlin-Mitte) until its disestablishment and the closure of the venue in 1997.

In 2002, the building, still closed, was listed as a protected cultural landmark by the Berlin Senate. It was taken over by successful bidders in 2003, who carried out extensive renovations. On August 11, 2006, it reopened with The Threepenny Opera, directed by Klaus Maria Brandauer.
