= Irina Liebmann =

German journalist and sinologist

- Born: Irina Herrnstadt; Ирина Гернштадт; 23 July 1943 (age 83); Moscow, Soviet Union
- Education: KMU Leipzig
- Occupation: Writer
- Spouse: Rolf Liebmann (1939–2003)
- Parents: Rudolf Herrnstadt (1903–1966) (father); Valentina Veloyants (mother)

Irina Liebmann is a German journalist-author and sinologist of Russo-German provenance. She has won a number of important literary prizes: the most significant of these, probably, was the 2008 Leipzig Book Fair non-fiction Prize, awarded for "Wäre es schön? Es wäre schön!", a biography of her father, a noted anti-Nazi activist and political exile in Warsaw and Moscow who, after 1945, returned to what became, in 1949, the German Democratic Republic (East Germany) and in 1953, despite his longstanding record of communist activism, emerged as an uncompromising critic of the East German leader Walter Ulbricht: he was expelled from the party and suffered various other government mandated public indignities. She grew up and lived the first part of her adult life in the German Democratic Republic, but succeeded in moving to West Berlin during 1988, thereby anticipating reunification by more than a year.

== Life ==
Irina Herrnstadt was born at the height of the Second World War in Moscow, to where her German-born Jewish father, the lawyer turned journalist Rudolf Herrnstadt (1903–1966) had fled from Warsaw following the twin-pronged invasion of Poland in September 1939. Moscow was at war when Irina was born. Life was a struggle for survival and there were only soldiers and military vehicles on the streets. The city had been evacuated in response to the German invasion. Only people deemed essential for the war effort had stayed on the city. Her father was editor-in-chief of a German language newspaper produced for prisoners of war. That was important for the war, so the Herrnstadts had stayed behind when the city was evacuated. It was in Moscow that Rudolf Herrnstadt had met Valentina Veloyants (Валентина Велоянца), Irina's mother: she wanted to take her new friend dancing but he "could not [dance]". The child was always told, later, that when her parents met her mother was a scholar of Germanistics, originally from Siberia. In 1945 the family were returned to Germany in April/May 1945, far sooner than most of the many thousands of German political exiles who had escaped to Moscow from Germany after 1933: this was because her father had been nominated to membership of the 30-man "nation building" Ulbricht Group, even though at the last minute his name was removed from the list on account of his Jewish provenance. They nevertheless settled in what was left of Berlin, based in that part of the city included in the Soviet occupation zone: till 1953, her father built for himself a successful career as a journalist-politician.

== Education ==
Irina Herrnstadt grew up bilingual. She attended school, initially, in Berlin. After her father's sudden political fall from grace in 1953 the family moved away from the centre of power, and her later schooling took place first at Merseburg and finally at Halle, where she successfully completed her school career in 1961. She then progressed to the prestigious Karl Marx University (as that institution was known between 1953 and 1990) in Leipzig, emerging with a degree in Sinology in 1966. She had selected an exceptionally challenging and unusual degree topic, but China was of particular interest to the East German ruling élite (and others) during the Cultural Revolution.

== Career ==
Between 1967 and 1975, Irina Herrnstadt worked as a contributing editor on "Deutsche Außenpolitik", an East German specialist journal dealing with the country's "foreign policy". It was while working at "Deutsche Außenpolitik" that Irina Herrnstadt got to know Rolf Liebmann (1939–2003), who subsequently became known as an innovator in the world of East German documentary film production. Irina Herrnstadt became Irina Liebmann.

== Literature ==
She continued writing after 1975, now primarily on a freelance basis. Many of her contributions were to East Berlin's principal mass-circulation weekly newspaper, "Wochenpost". Increasingly, she was also authoring radio plays and other prose pieces including, towards and beyond the later 1980s, two children's books and several stage plays.

In November 1987 she came to the attention of the authorities as a result of her contribution that year to the tenth congress of the (East) German Writer's Association. Participating in a large discussion group she urged comrades to introduce a "Theatre of Authors". What she had in mind, she explained, was a theatre "in which the authors put the programme together themselves". Under the existing system of largely covert but nevertheless highly effective censorship, contemporary drama had virtually no chance of finding its way into the theatres. She had already presented the same suggestion at a writers' workshop in March 1987. Representatives of East German theatre criticised the proposal for such a "bourgeois institution": a "Theatre of Authors" as proposed by Liebmann would insufficiently recognise the needs of audiences. The idea gained no official traction in East Germany. The old men who still called the shots felt far more comfortable with "known classics". Beyond officialdom, however, Liebmann's proposal evidenced a network of increasingly confident and strident opposition to theatre censorship, both among "famous name" celebrity authors such as Günter de Bruyn and Christoph Hein, and across the intellectual classes more generally.

Shortly afterwards, during 1988 Irina Liebmann and her family, increasingly alienated by conditions in East Germany, relocated to West Berlin.

During the years that followed she has adopted a literary genre of non-fictional prose works that retains much of the drama and lyricism to be sought in novels. One case in point is her so-called autobiographical novel, "In Berlin", published in 1994, in which deeply emotional impressions of life – apparently of her own life – in Berlin Wall through the years of division are expressed exclusively in images of the city. The fast-paced action is largely set in the centre of the city during and directly after 1990, albeit with a large amount of input from Berlin's complicated past. The central character, like the author, is named "Liebmann", though there is also a sense in which the city is itself a co-protagonist.

Irina Liebmann has been a member of the German Academy for Linguistics and Literature since 2014.

== Awards and prizes (selection) ==
- 1980: Radio drama prize of the German Democratic Republic for "Christina"
- 1987: Ernst Willner Prize at the Ingeborg Bachmann festival-competition in Klagenfurt
- 1989: Aspekte Literature Prize for a best first novel for "Mitten im Krieg"
- 1990: Runner up scholarship from the Bremen Literature Prize awards
- 1991: Stipendium from the Prussian Sea Commerce liquidation fund foundation
- 1995: Stipendium from the Villa Aurora in Los Angeles
- 1996: Award of Honour ("Ehrengabe") from the German Schiller foundation
- 1998: Berlin Literature prize
- 1998/1999: Stipendium from the International Villa Concordia Artists' House in Bamberg
- 2001: Visiting professorship at Oberlin College, Lorain County (OH)
- 2008: Leipzig Book Fair non-fiction Prize for her biography of her father.
- 2015: "By authors for authors" prize from the Lübeck Writers' Conference ("...Literaturtreffen")
- 2020: Uwe Johnson Prize for her book Die Große Hamburger Straße.

== Bibliography (selection) ==
=== printed ===
- Berliner Mietshaus ("Berlin Lodging House" – a docu-novel based on intervirews with the residents of an East Berlin tenement block). Dokumentarische Erzählungen. Mitteldeutscher Verlag, Halle/Saale/Leipzig 1982.
  - weitere Ausgaben: Frankfurter Verlagsanstalt, Frankfurt am Main 1990; Fischer Taschenbuch Verlag, Frankfurt am Main 1993, ISBN 3-596-11287-7; Berliner Taschenbuch Verlag, Berlin 2002, ISBN 3-354-00026-0.
- Ich bin ein komischer Vogel. Kinderbuch. Altberliner Verlag, Berlin 1988, ISBN 3-357-00264-7.
- Redebeitrag. X. Schriftstellerkongreß der DDR. Plenum, 24. November – 26. November 1987. Aufbau Verlag, Berlin/Weimar, 1988. ISBN 3-351-01255-1.
- Mitten im Krieg. Erzählungen. Frankfurter Verlagsanstalt, Frankfurt am Main 1989. ISBN 3-8333-0005-1.
  - weitere Ausgaben: Fischer Verlag, 1992; Berliner Taschenbuchverlag, 2006.
- Berliner Kindl. Stück. In: Theatertexte: Berg, Buhss, Knaup, Liebmann, Müller, Plenzdorf, Trolle, Walsdorf. Hg. von Peter Reichel. Henschelverlag, 1989.
- Quatschfresser. Theaterstücke. Frankfurter Verlagsanstalt, Frankfurt am Main 1990. ISBN 3-627-10077-8.
- Die sieben Fräulein. Kinderbuch. Altberliner Verlag, Berlin 1990.
- In Berlin. Roman. Kiepenheuer & Witsch, Köln 1994, ISBN 3-462-02337-3.
  - weitere Ausgaben: Berliner Taschenbuchverlag 2002 (u. 2005).
- Der Weg zum Bahnhof. Theaterstück. Henschel, Berlin/Heilbronn 1994.
- März, Berlin, in: Von Abraham bis Zwerenz. Eine Anthologie als Beitrag zur geistig-kulturellen Einheit in Deutschland. (zwei Bd.). Hg. vom Bundesministerium für Bildung, Wissenschaft, Forschung und Technologie. Cornelsen Verlag 1995.
- Wo Gras wuchs bis zu Tischen hoch. Gedichte mit Zeichnungen von Xago. Europäische Verlagsanstalt, Hamburg 1995.
- Die schöne Welt der Tiere. Gedichte mit Zeichnungen von Xago. I. Liebmann, Rothspalk 1995.
- Autofahrenlernen in L.A. Gedichte. Villa Aurora e. V. Berlin, ISBN 978-3-00-033055-1.
- Perwomajsk, Erster Mai und La la la L.A. Poem und Fotografien. I. Liebmann, Rothspalk 1996.
- Letzten Sommer in Deutschland, eine romantische Reise. Poem. Kiepenheuer & Witsch, Köln 1997. ISBN 3-462-02634-8.
  - weitere Ausgabe: Berlin Verlag 2005.
- Stille Mitte von Berlin. Essay und Fotografien. Nicolai, Berlin 2002, ISBN 3-87584-150-6.
  - weitere Ausgabe: Berlin Verlag, 2009.
- Die freien Frauen. Roman. Berlin Verlag, Berlin 2004, ISBN 3-8270-0347-4.
- Wäre es schön? Es wäre schön! Mein Vater Rudolf Herrnstadt. Berlin Verlag, Berlin 2008, ISBN 978-3-8270-0589-2.
  - auch als Ausgabe der Bundeszentrale für politische Bildung, Schriftenreihe (Bd. 719), Bonn 2009.
- Die schönste Wohnung hab ich schon, was soll denn jetzt noch werden? Gedichte. Transit Buchverlag, 2010, ISBN 978-3-88747-248-1.
- Georg Seidel: In seiner Freizeit las der Angeklagte Märchen. Hrsg. v. Irina Liebmann und Elisabeth Seidel. Kiepenheuer & Witsch, Köln 1992, ISBN 3-462-02177-X.
- Drei Schritte nach Russland. Erzählung. Berlin Verlag, Berlin 2013, ISBN 978-3-8270-1138-1.
- Das Lied vom Hackeschen Markt. Drei politische Poeme. Hanani Verlag, Berlin 2013, ISBN 978-3-944174-01-3.
- Die Große Hamburger Straße. Roman. Schöffling & Co., Frankfurt am Main 2020, ISBN 978-3-89561-258-9.

=== radio plays ===
- 1978: Neun Berichte über Ronald, der seine Großmutter begraben wollte. Regie: Achim Scholz (Hörspiel – Rundfunk der DDR)
- 1979: Christina Regie: Werner Grunow (Hörspiel – Rundfunk der DDR)
- 1982: Ist denn nirgendwo was los? Regie: Christoph Schroth (Hörspiel – Rundfunk der DDR)
- 1982: Sie müssen jetzt gehen, Frau Mühsam. Regie: Barbara Plensat (Hörspiel – Rundfunk der DDR)
- 1988: Hast du die Nacht genutzt? Regie: Barbara Plensat (Hörspiel – Rundfunk der DDR)
- 1990: März, Berlin. (auch Sprecherin) – Regie: Jörg Jannings (Hörspiel – RIAS Berlin/NDR)
- 2014: Erzähl mir von Russland. Regie: Barbara Plensat (Hörspiel – RBB)
