= Klaus Huhn =

German sports journalist and administrator

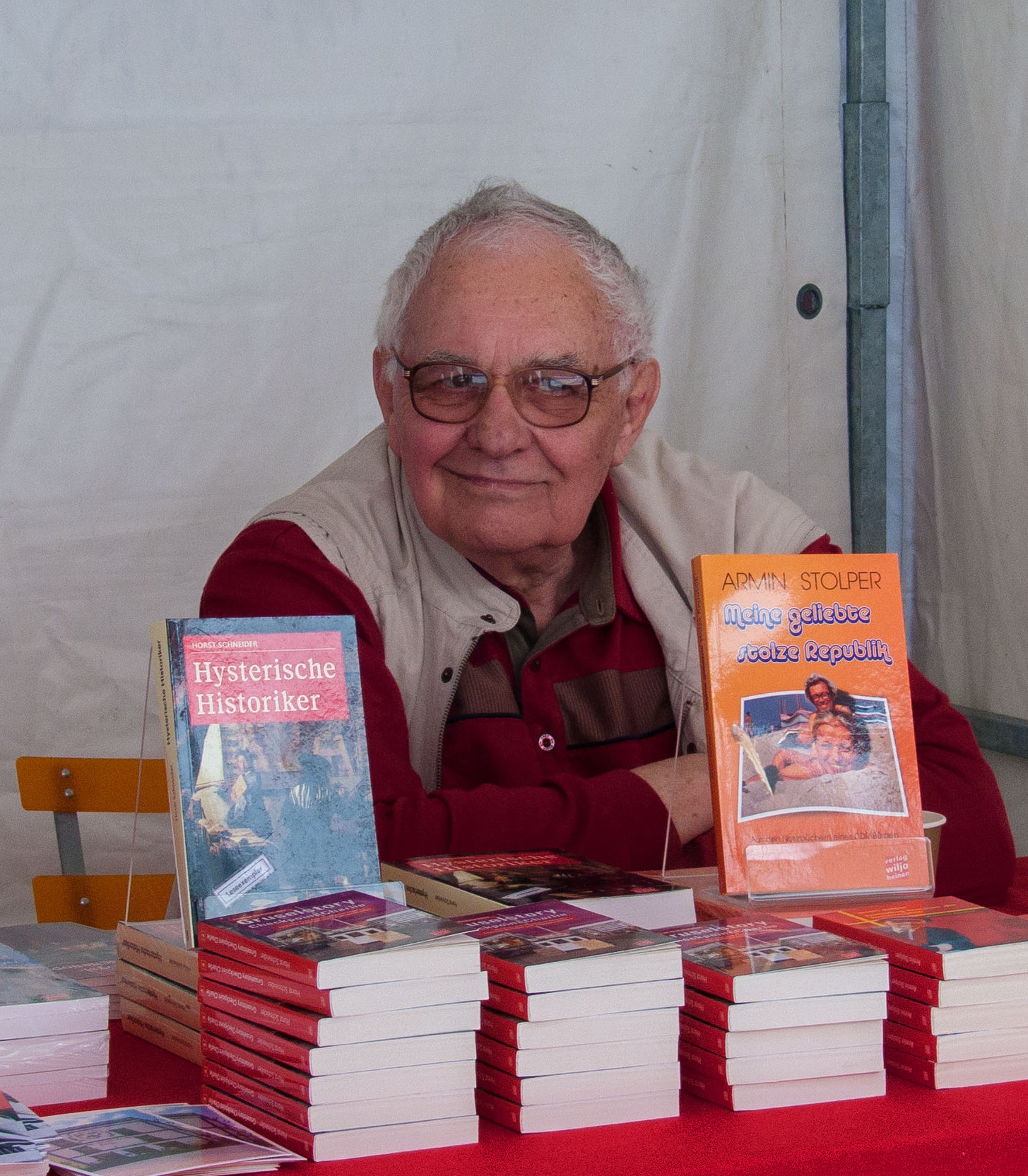
Huhn in 2008

Klaus Huhn (24 February 1928 – 20 January 2017) was a German sports journalist, writer and sports administrator. Huhn worked for the East German mass-market daily newspaper, Neues Deutschland, and was chairman of the Sports Journalists Sub-Association within that country's important Union of Journalists.

As a writer he concentrated on the great names from the sporting history of the German Democratic Republic (GDR), and wrote, more recently, largely for the "GDR nostalgia" readership.

He published several books about the cycling legend Gustav-Adolf Schur, and was employed as the ghostwriter for Schur's autobiography. The book's objectivity was questioned by one reviewer who described it as "shameless propaganda".

== Life ==
Huhn was born into a Communist family, in Berlin, where his father was a clerical worker. Huhn attended secondary school in Berlin and in Saalfeld.

In 1946 he joined the Deutsche Volkszeitung, the central organ of the Communist Party of Germany (KPD) in the Soviet occupation zone. In 1954 he took a correspondence course in journalism at the Karl Marx University in Leipzig and in 1983 he was at the German College of Physical Culture, also in Leipzig, with a doctorate in pedagogy.

He died at the age of 88 on 20 January 2017.

== Books ==
- 2016 Exkursion durch volkseigene Ruinen: Vom Verschwinden einer ganzen Volkswirtschaft, ("Excursion Through Nationalized Ruins: the Disappearance of an Entire Economy"), Edition Berolina, ISBN 978-3958-4106-57
