= Liegnitz (electoral district) =

Former constituency of the Reichstag (Weimar Republic)

8 Liegnitz
- Former electoral constituency for the Reichstag
- Location within the Weimar Republic
- State: Prussia
- Province: Lower Silesia
- Electorate: 652,205 (1919); 843,733 (1933)
- Major settlements: Görlitz, Lauban, Liegnitz, Hirschberg, Glogau, Grünberg

Former constituency
- Created: 1919
- Abolished: 1938

Liegnitz was one of the 35 electoral districts (German: Wahlkreise) used to elect members to the Reichstag during the Weimar Republic. It sent members to the Reichstag in nine democratic elections between 1919 and 1933. It existed nominally in the show elections to the Nazi Reichstag until 1938.

It comprised the Regierungsbezirk Liegnitz, the western part of the province of Lower Silesia, within the Free State of Prussia. It was constituency 8 in the numbering scheme.

== Electoral system ==
The constituency was created for the January 1919 election. Under the proportional representation electoral system of the Weimar Republic, voters cast a vote for party lists. Parties were awarded a seat for every 60,000 votes in a constituency. Excess votes were aggregated at two higher levels of seat distribution: an intermediate level combining multiple constituencies, where extra seats were awarded to parties' constituency lists, and a national level where seats were awarded to national lists of each party or alliance.

== Results (1919–1933) ==
=== Vote share ===
Party	1919	1920	1924 I	1924 II	1928	1930	1932 I	1932 II	1933
KPD		1.0	6.0	3.3	4.2	6.1	7.6	9.9	6.7
USPD	0.0	10.5		0.2					
SPD	50.2	32.2	27.5	32.8	37.8	32.0	26.3	26.4	21.4
DDP	26.8	12.6	7.6	8.0	6.3	4.9	1.0	0.9	0.6
Centre	9.4	9.0	8.8	8.9	7.9	7.8	7.2	7.1	6.4
DVP		13.9	8.0	8.3	6.6	3.5	0.8	1.2	0.6
WP			5.5	4.7	7.0	5.3	0.5	0.5	
DLV					0.1	6.3	0.2		
DNVP	13.6	20.6	30.0	28.9	24.5	8.6	6.9	9.9	9.1
Nazi			1.5	1.5	1.2	20.9	48.0	42.1	54.0
Other		0.3	5.3	3.5	4.3	4.7	1.5	2.1	1.2
Turnout	87.7	82.9	82.6	82.1	77.7	84.0	86.6	83.2	90.2
Source: Wahlen in Deutschland

=== Deputies ===
Election	Distribution	Seats
1919		8
1920		8
May 1924		9
Dec 1924		8
1928		9
1930		10
Jul 1932		11
Nov 1932		10
1933		11
Source: Wahlen in Deutschland
