= GDR Union of Journalists =

Association of journalists in East Germany

Association of Journalists of the GDR
- Verband der Journalisten der DDR
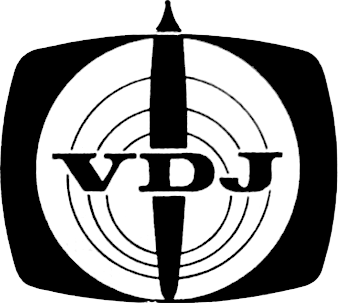
- Abbreviation: VdJ
- Founded: 28 January 1946
- Dissolved: 30 September 1990
- Headquarters: Admiralspalast, East Berlin, East Germany
- Location: East Germany
- Members: 9,100 (1990)
- Chairman: Eberhard Heinrich (1981–1990)
- Main organ: Central Board
- Parent organization: Agitation Department of the Central Committee of the SED (de facto)
- Affiliations: International Organization of Journalists

The Association of Journalists of the GDR (German: Verband der Journalisten der DDR, abbreviated VdJ) was a professional association of journalists in East Germany (the German Democratic Republic, GDR). VdJ organized news, press, radio and television journalists, as well as press officers, publishing staff, cartoonists, documentarists and teachers of journalism. VJD conducted trainings for journalists, on behalf of the Ministry for Higher and Professional Education. The offices of the VdJ were located at Friedrichstraße 101, Berlin, in the Admiralspalast.

VdJ was founded as the German Press Union (Verband der Deutschen Presse, VDP). A VDP organization was founded in Berlin on 10 October 1945. It officially launched its activities on 1 January 1946. A de facto separate VDP was set up in the Soviet occupation zone. As of April 1946 the Berlin VDP had 327 members. The Berlin VDP was included in the Arts and Letters Trade Union ('Trade Union no. 17') of Free German Trade Union Federation (FDGB) in July 1946. By December in the same year the membership had reached 958. In March 1947 the Berlin organization had 1,107 members (80% of the working journalists in the city).

In 1949 VDP joined International Organization of Journalists (IOJ). The organization worked in all sectors of Berlin until 1950. In the same year the Trade Union No. 17 was dissolved and VDP became an affiliate of its own to FDGB. By this time the VDP in Berlin and the Soviet occupation zone were merged into a unified organization. On 27 January 1951 VDP opened an Institute for Journalists and Newspaper Patrons. On 21 October 1951 Fritz Apelt stepped down as first chairman of VDP. Karl Bittel became the first chairman of VDJ.

VDP was affiliated to FDGB until 1953. In 1957 Georg Krausz became the new chairman of VDP. Under his rein, more emphasis was given to the educational activities of the organization.

The 4th Central Delegates' Conference of VDP, held on 30 May 1959, decided to change the name of the organization to Union of German Journalists (Verband der Deutschen Journalisten). As of 1968 Harri Czepuck was the chairman of VDJ. In 1972 the name GDR Union of Journalists was adopted.

At the Werner Lamberz International Institute for Journalism in Berlin, VDJ/VdJ provided training for foreign journalists. During 1963–1979 a total of 432 journalists from 39 countries in Africa and Asia were trained at the institute.

In 1981, Eberhard Heinrich replaced Czepuck as chairman. By 1983 VdJ had partnership agreements with 48 journalists' associations worldwide (including with journalists' associations linked to national liberation movements). As of 1988, VdJ had some 9,000 members (roughly 90% of the journalists in East Germany).

Due to the radical changes in East Germany during the Peaceful Revolution, VdJ held an extraordinary congress in January 1990. On 23–24 June the organization held another, ordinary, congress, on which it was decided that VdJ be dissolved. The dissolution came into effect on 30 September that year, three days before the German Reunification.

== See also ==
- National Front of the German Democratic Republic
