= Harri Czepuck =

German journalist (1927–2015)

- Born: 30 July 1927; Breslau, Province of Lower Silesia, Germany
- Died: 14 June 2015 (aged 87)
- Occupations: Journalist; Newspaper editor Trades union president Writer

Harri Czepuck (30 July 1927 – 14 June 2015) was a German journalist.

In 1967 he was appointed President of the Journalists' Union in the German Democratic Republic.

== Life ==
=== Early years ===
Czepuck trained as an insurance salesman. Between 1944 and 1945 he served in the army, being captured by the Soviets near Halbe, and becoming a prisoner of war detained, initially, by the Soviets and subsequently by the Poles until 1949. In January 1949 he became editor of Die Brücke, a German prisoners of war newspaper.

=== Party membership and a career in journalism ===
By now the frontier between Germany and Poland had moved westward along with millions of Germans. As part of this process Breslau was now a Polish city. In June 1949 Czepuck was released from imprisonment not in his former home district but in the Soviet occupation zone which was in the process of mutating into the German Democratic Republic. He lost no time in joining the new country's newly formed ruling SED (Socialist Unity Party of Germany/Sozialistische Einheitspartei Deutschlands). He started work, initially as a volunteer, for Neues Deutschland, a leading national newspaper, and progressed through a succession of positions in the editorial department, as a department head and as the newspaper's correspondent in Bonn. In January 1966 he was appointed Deputy Chief Editor. However, at the start of October 1971 he lost the position on account of conflicts with Joachim Herrmann, the editor in chief.

In July 1967 Czepuck was at the top of a list of the first twelve East German journalists in many years to be permitted to attend the party conference of the West German SPD.

=== Beyond journalism ===
Between 1967 and 1971 he served on the "West Commission" of the Party Central Committee's politburo. Between 1967 and January 1981 he was President of the German Journalists' Union (which in June 1972 renamed itself "Union of Journalists in the German Democratic Republic" / VDJ). At the same time he was also Vice-president of the Prague based "International Organisation of Journalists" (IOJ) between 1971 and 1981. In 1984 he retired on an invalidity pension although he continued to write as a freelance journalist.

In 1990 Czepuck joined the PDS which was setting itself up in the newly reunited Germany as a successor to the rather different SED which had in effect been the only party under the one party dictatorship of East Germany. During the twenty-first century he remained a member of "Die Linke" / "The Left" which was in effect a further developed and repackaged version of the PDS that was relaunched in 2007.

He was also a founding member of the Society for good neighbourly relations between German and Poland (Gesellschaft für gute Nachbarschaft mit Polen).

== Publications ==
- Czepuck, Harri (1999). Meine Wendezeiten : Erinnerungen, Erwägungen, Erwartungen (in German). Berlin: Dietz. ISBN 3-320-01971-6. OCLC 41878462.
- Bentzien, Hans [in German] (2003). Fragen an die DDR : alles, was man über den deutschen Arbeiter-und-Bauern-Staat wissen muss (in German). [Berlin]: Edition Ost. ISBN 3-360-01045-0. OCLC 52980233.
