= Hermann Matern =

German communist politician

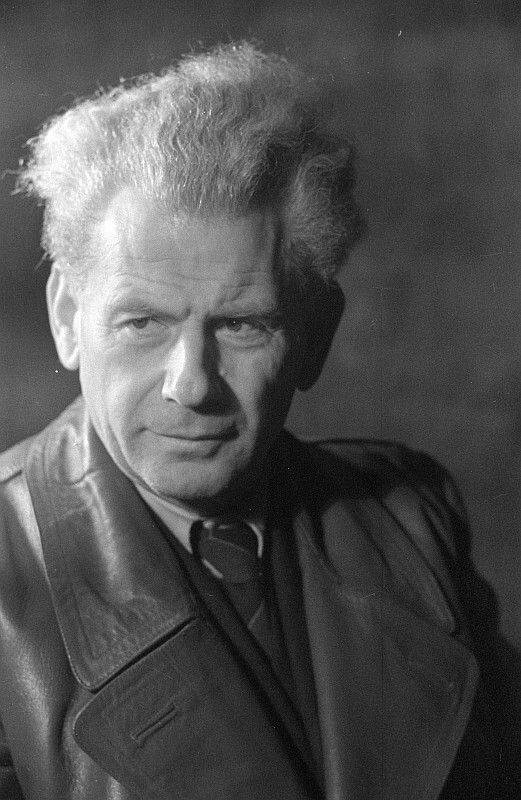
- Portrait by Abraham Pisarek, 1946

Chairman of the Central Party Control Commission
- In office 21 October 1948 – 24 January 1971
- First Secretary: Walter Ulbricht
- Deputy: Herta Geffke
- Preceded by: Position established
- Succeeded by: Erich Mückenberger

Deputy President of the Volkskammer (Note: "First Deputy President" from 1954 until 1963)
- In office 7 October 1949 – 24 January 1971
- President: Johannes Dieckmann; Gerald Götting
- Preceded by: Position established
- Succeeded by: Friedrich Ebert Jr.

Leader of the Socialist Unity Party in the Volkskammer
- In office 7 October 1949 – 24 January 1971
- Preceded by: Position established
- Succeeded by: Friedrich Ebert Jr.

Chairman of the Socialist Unity Party in Berlin
- In office 21 April 1946 – 18 October 1948 Serving with Karl Litke
- Preceded by: Position established
- Succeeded by: Hans Jendretzky
Parliamentary constituencies
Member of the Volkskammer for Staßfurt, Schönebeck, Zerbst, Burg
In office 18 March 1948 – 24 January 1971
Preceded by	Constituency established
Succeeded by	Siegfried Mohr
Member of the Landtag of Prussia for East Prussia
In office 25 May 1932 – 31 March 1933
Preceded by	Multi-member district
Succeeded by	Constituency abolished

Personal details
- Born: 17 June 1893 Bremen, Free Hanseatic City of Bremen, German Empire (now Germany)
- Died: 24 January 1971 (aged 77) East Berlin, East Germany
- Party: SPD (1911–1914); USPD (1918–1919); KPD (1919–1946); SED (1946–1971)
- Education: International Lenin School
- Occupation: Politician; Party Functionary; Tanner

Military service
- Allegiance: German Empire
- Branch/service: Imperial German Army
- Years of service: 1914–1918
- Battles/wars: World War I; Western Front
- Central institution membership: 1950–1971: Full member, Politburo of the Central Committee; 1946–1971: Full member, Central Committee; 1945–1946: Full member, KPD Central Committee; Other offices held: 1960–1971: Member, National Defence Council; 1954–1960: Member, Security Commission at the Politburo; 1946–1950: Member, Landtag of Saxony; 1931–1933: Political Leader, East Prussia KPD; 1927–1928, 1929–1931: Political Leader, Magdeburg KPD; 1926–1933: Member, Landtag of the Province of Saxony

Hermann Matern (17 June 1893 – 24 January 1971) was a German communist politician and high ranking functionary of the Socialist Unity Party (SED) in East Germany. From the nation's founding in 1949 until his death in 1971 he served as chairman of the Central Party Control Commission, deputy president of the Volkskammer, and leader of the SED in the Volkskammer, in addition to holding full membership in the party's Central Committee and Politburo.

== Early life and career ==
=== Early political activities ===
Matern was the son of a social democratic worker and himself worked as a tanner. He joined the Socialist Workers' Youth and later the Social Democratic Party of Germany in 1911. He resigned from the SPD when the party accepted war loans. During the First World War he served as a soldier in France.

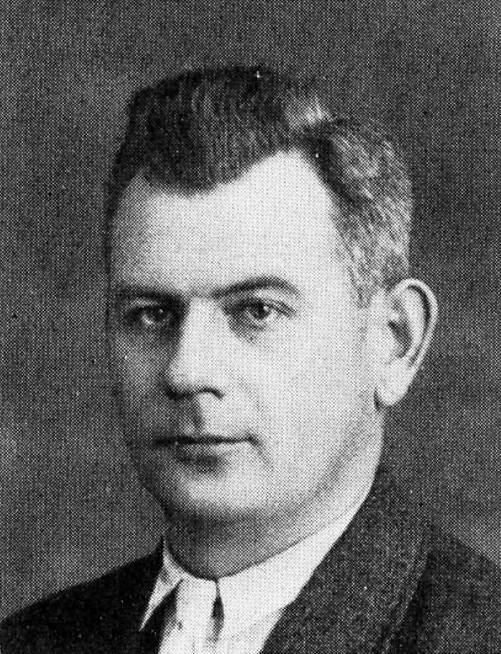
Matern's official Landtag portrait, 1932

In 1918, he joined the Independent Social Democratic Party (USPD) and was a participant in the November Revolution and a member of a workers' and soldiers' council. Here he was elected commander of the guard regiment in Magdeburg. From 1919 to 1926 he worked as a tanner in Burg, became a member of the KPD and became KPD chairman in Burg, works council chairman, honorary city council and from 1926 to 1928 KPD trade union secretary. He was a member of the Gau Board and the Reich Tariff Commission of the German Leather Workers' Association. He became Polleiter (political leader) of the party's Magdeburg district in 1927, and from 1928 to 1929 attended the International Lenin School in Moscow. When he returned to Germany he resumed his work as political leader of Magdeburg until 1931, when he was transferred to serve as political leader of the East Prussia district until 1933. (Note: He was preceded in this position by Paul Grobis. His Orgleiter (organizational leader) was Walter Schwindt until 1932, then Albert Schettkat.) From 1932 to 1933 he was a member of the Prussian state parliament.

=== Arrest and exile ===
After the rise of the Nazi regime, Matern was arrested in 1933. In September 1934 he managed to escape from the Stettin-Altdamm prison. He emigrated to Czechoslovakia, then via Switzerland to France. It was here in 1935 that he met his future wife Jenny, who followed him from then on and also became a politician. In the Lutetia district (1935 to 1936) he was involved in the attempt to create a popular front against the Nazi regime. His escape took him via Belgium to the Netherlands, Norway and finally Sweden. In the spring of 1941 he moved to Moscow. He became a member of the National Committee for Free Germany. Later he was a teacher at the Central Anti-fascist School in Krasnogorsk.

== Return to Germany ==
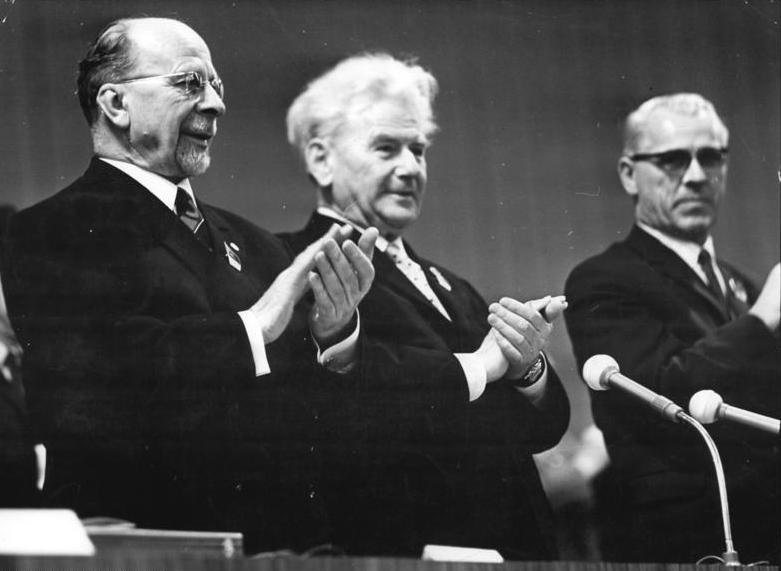
Matern (center) with Walter Ulbricht (left) and Willi Stoph, 1967

On 1 May 1945 Matern returned to Germany with Anton Ackermann's group. He was one of the signatories of the programmatic appeal of the Central Committee of the KPD of 11 June 1945. Until 1946 he was the first secretary of the district leadership of the KPD in Saxony. After the unification of the SPD and KPD in the Soviet zone of occupation, Matern served as chairman of the regional association of Greater Berlin of the Socialist Unity Party of Germany (SED) from 1946 to 1948, alongside Karl Litke.

Matern was a member of the central secretariat of the party executive from 1946 to 1950, and was made chairman of the Central Party Control Commission (ZPKK) on 21 October 1948 and a member of the Politburo of the Central Committee of the SED in 1950. In the Politburo, he was responsible for controlling the “Traffic Department” of the Central Committee, which was responsible for the secret connections to the KPD in West Germany, which was illegal from 1955, and later to the DKP, and for the financing of these parties. As one of the leading politicians he participated in the Marxist–Leninist orientation of the SED.

From 1949 he was a member of the Provisional People's Chamber, from 1950 to 1954 as vice-president, then as the first deputy of the president and from 1957 to 1960 as chairman of the standing committee for the local representations. He was a member of the National Defense Council of the GDR.

Following the East German uprising of 1953, a majority of the Politburo supported removing Walter Ulbricht as First Secretary of the party; only Matern and one other, Erich Honecker, remained loyal to Ulbricht. Ulbricht was saved with the support of Soviet leader Nikita Khrushchev, and subsequently purged the opposition from the Politburo.

Matern became a member of the International Federation Resistance of Fighters General Council in 1963.

Matern was convinced of the SED's claim to leadership. At the 7th All-German Workers' Conference in Leipzig in 1958, he said:

“To have state power in your hands is of great importance. [...] We never think of giving up workers' and peasants' power again. We will not allow anyone to run for election who wants to rebuild capitalism. [...] That is why there is no opposition based on bourgeois ideas. "

== Death and legacy ==
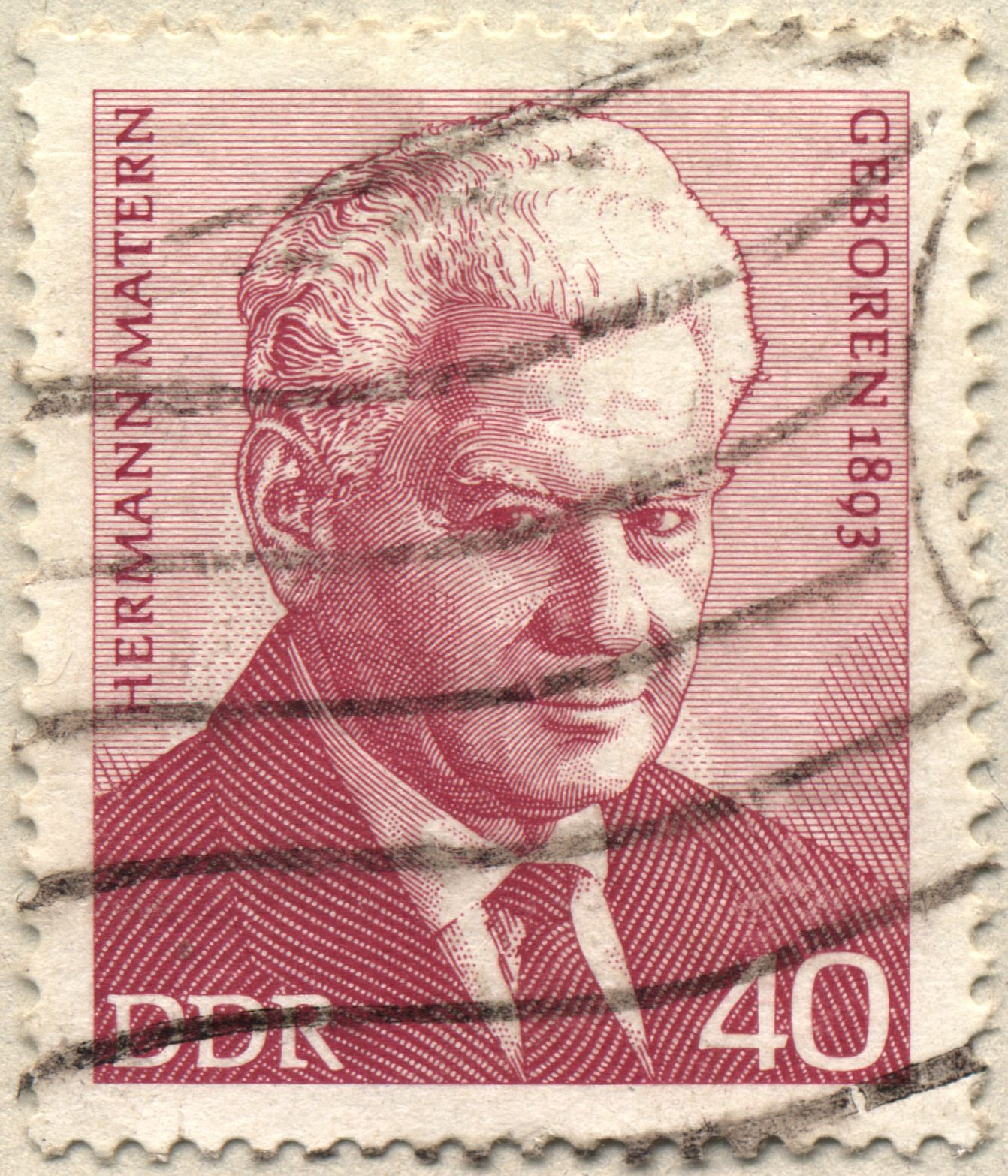
East German commemorative stamp featuring Matern, 1973

Matern died in East Berlin on 24 January 1971. His urn was buried in the memorial of the socialists in the Zentralfriedhof Friedrichsfelde in Berlin-Lichtenberg.

The German Post Office of the GDR issued a special stamp on the occasion of his 80th birthday on 13 June 1973.

Many streets, schools and factories bore the name of Matern in the GDR.

The 8th Fighter Squadron of the Air Force of the National People's Army (LSK / LV) in Marxwalde had had his name since 1972, as did the technical school of the Ministry of the Interior of the GDR in Heyrothsberge.

In February 1971, Secondary School No. 70 in Moscow received a new name - "Special Secondary School No. 70 Hermann Matern" (средняя специальная школа № 70 имени Германа Матерна).

A plaque on the enclosure of Wackerbarth Castle still commemorates the meeting of Soviet politicians and military officials (Anastas Mikoyan and Ivan Konev) with German politicians (Hermann Matern, Kurt Fischer and Rudolf Friedrichs) in May 1945.

== Awards and honours ==
- 1953 and 1969 Karl Marx Order
- 1955 Patriotic Order of Merit in Gold
- 1960 Order of Banner of Labor
- 1963 Honorary title Hero of Labor
- 1965 Gold medal for the Patriotic Order of Merit
- 1967 Order of the Star of the Friendship of Nations
- 1968 Order of Lenin (USSR)
- 1968 Order of the Patriotic War II degree (USSR)

== Publications ==
- Berlin und Deutschland. Reden zu Problemen der Zeit. Berlin, 1947.
- 1947 das Jahr größter Entscheidungen. Unsere Aufgaben im neuen Jahr. Rede auf der Funktionärskonferenz der SED am 5. Januar 1947. Berlin 1947.
- Der Weg. Frieden, Freiheit, Wohlstand. Berlin 1948.
- Die Rolle Ernst Thälmanns bei der Schaffung der revolutionären Massenpartei der Arbeiterklasse. Referat a. d. Propagandistenkonferenz d. Abteilung Propaganda beim ZK der SED am 14. und 15. Juli 1951 in Berlin. Berlin 1951.
- Breite Entfaltung von Kritik und Selbstkritik. Diskussionsbeitrag auf der 2. Parteikonferenz der SED, Berlin, 9.–12. Juli 1952. Berlin 1952.
- (Hrsg.): Weissbuch über den Generalkriegsvertrag. Leipzig 1952.
- Über die Durchführung des Beschlusses des ZK der SED „Lehren aus dem Prozess gegen das Verschwörerzentrum Slansky“. 13. Tagung des ZK der SED, 13.-14. Mai 1953. Berlin 1953.
- Die unerschütterliche Einheit und Geschlossenheit der Partei – Quelle ihrer Macht und Siege! Bericht der Zentralen Parteikontrollkommission auf dem IV. Parteitag der SED vom 30. März bis 6. April 1954. Berlin 1954.
- Deutschland in der Periode der Weltwirtschaftskrise 1929–1933. Der Kampf der Kommunistischen Partei Deutschlands um die Aktionseinheit der Arbeiterklasse gegen die Gefahr des Faschismus und des Krieges. Berlin 1956.
- Deutschland in der Periode der relativen Stabilisierung des Kapitalismus 1924–1929. Der Kampf des deutschen Proletariats unter Führung der KPD gegen das Wiedererstarken des deutschen Imperialismus. Berlin 1956.
- Erich Weinert: Das Nationalkomitee Freies Deutschland 1943–1945. Bericht über seine Tätigkeit und seine Auswirkung. Mit einem Geleitwort von Hermann Matern. Rütten & Loening, Berlin 1957.
- Aus dem Leben und Kampf der deutschen Arbeiterbewegung. Dietz, Berlin 1958.
- Der Parteitag der SPD und die Politik der SED zur Herstellung der Aktionseinheit der deutschen Arbeiterklasse im Kampf gegen die atomare Aufrüstung und für die Bildung einer Konföderation beider deutschen Staaten. Berlin 1958.
- Im Kampf für Frieden, Demokratie und Sozialismus. Ausgewählte Reden und Schriften. Berlin 1963

== Sources ==
- Hoffmann, Dierk; Schmid, Karl-Heinz (1993). Skyba, Peter (ed.). Die DDR vor dem Mauerbau: Dokumente zur Geschichte des anderen deutschen Staates, 1949-1961. Serie Piper, 1799 (in German). München: Piper. ISBN 9783492117999. OCLC 246414094.
- Stulz-Herrnstadt, Nadja (1990). Das Herrnstadt-Dokument: das Politbüro der SED und die Geschichte des 17. Juni 1953 [The Herrnstadt Document. The Politburo of the SED and the history of June 17, 1953] (in German). Reinbek bei Hamburg: Rowohlt. ISBN 9783499128370. OCLC 25025392.
- Kramer, Mark (1999). "The Early Post-Stalin Succession Struggle and Upheavals in East-Central Europe: Internal-External Linkages in Soviet Policy Making (Part 3)". Journal of Cold War Studies. 1 (3): 3–66. ISSN 1520-3972. JSTOR 26925028.
