= Stefan Hördler =

German historian

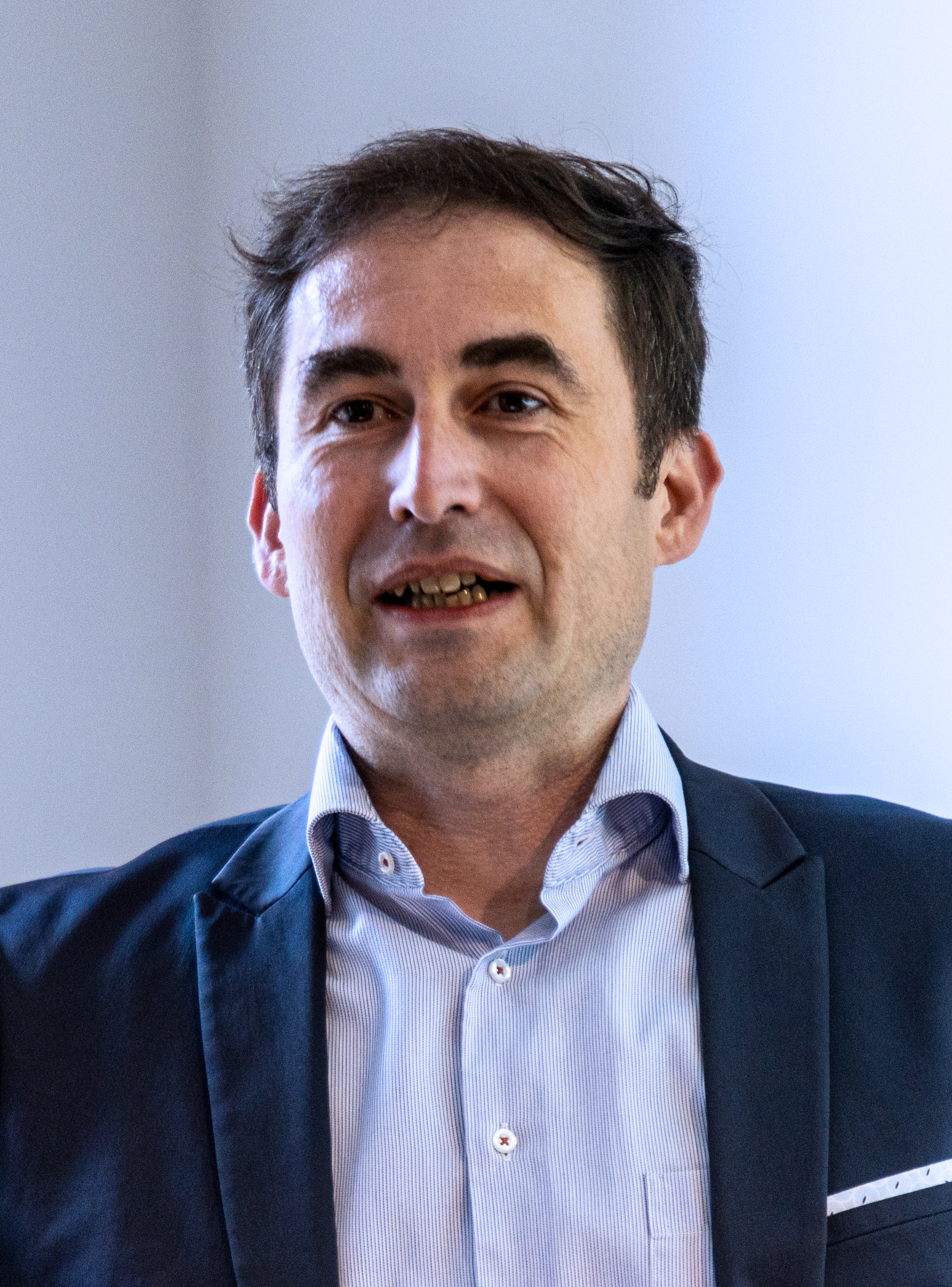
Stefan Hördler

Stefan Hördler is a German historian who specialises in the history of The Holocaust.

== Selected publications ==
- Lichtenburg. Ein deutsches Konzentrationslager (Lichtenburg: A German Concentration Camp)
- Dokumentations- und Gedenkort KZ Lichtenburg. Konzeption einer neuen Dauerausstellung für Werkstattgebäude und Bunker. (Lichtenburg Concentration Camp Documentation and Memorial Site: Concept for a New Permanent Exhibition of the Repair Station and Prison Building). LIT-Verlag.
- Der Nationalsozialismus im Spiegel des öffentlichen Gedächtnisses. Formen der Aufarbeitung und des Gedenkens (National Socialism in the Public Memory: Methods of Remembrance and Coming to Terms with the Past). Metropol-Verlag, 2005.
