= Katharina Kern =

German anti-government activist

Katharina "Käthe" Kern
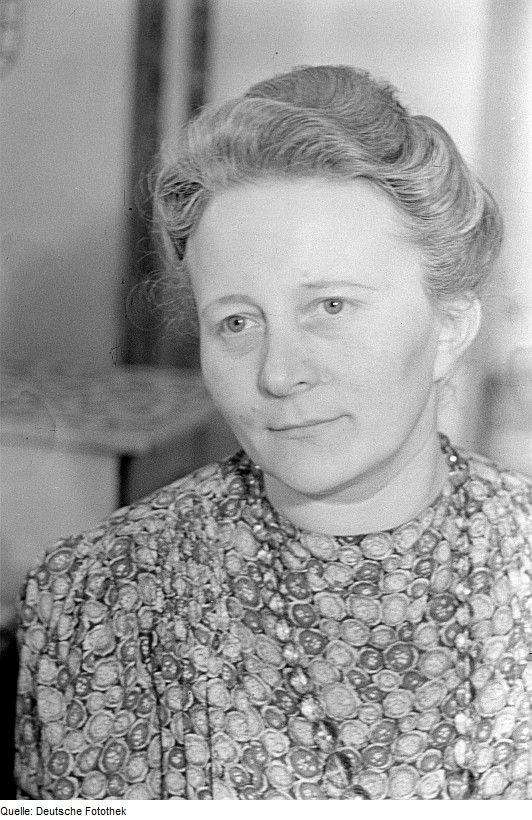
- Born: 22 July 1900; Darmstadt, Hesse-Darmstadt, Germany
- Died: 16 April 1985; Berlin, German Democratic Republic (East Germany)
- Occupations: Clerical worker Political activist Resistance activist Party official and politician Central Committee member
- Political party: SPD; SED

Katharina "Käthe" Kern (22 July 1900 – 16 April 1985) became a German anti-government activist during the Hitler years. After 1945 she quickly emerged as a senior politician and party loyalist in the Soviet occupation zone (after October 1949 the German Democratic Republic / East Germany). She served between 1946 and 1985 as a member of what became the powerful Party Central Committee. A long-standing leading figure in the Ministry for the Health Service), she also served, between 1949 and 1970, as head of the national "Mother and Child department" ("Hauptabteilung Mutter und Kind").

== Life ==
=== Provenance and early years ===
Katharina "Käthe" Kern was born into a working-class family in Darmstadt as the twentieth century dawned. Darmstadt, which was also the city where she grew up and lived as a young adult, had become a prosperous industrial, commercial and cultural centre during the second half of the nineteenth century. It was here that she completed her apprenticeship for a career as a clerical-commercial worker. In 1919 Käthe Kern joined the Young Socialists. Just one year later, still not 21, she joined the SPD which, following electoral reform, had recently found itself in the novel position of being the largest party in a new German parliament and leading participant in the coalition government of a post-imperial German republic. Kern was an activist party member and trades unionist from the outset. Between 1921 and 1933 she was a member of the "Zentralverband der Angestellten" (ZdA), a trades union of private sector clerical workers. Meanwhile, she supported herself between October 1921 and October 1924 by working as a secretary for the president of Landesversicherungsanstalt Hessen, the Darmstadt-based statutory pension insurance provider branch for Hessen.

Between November 1924 and 1925 Kern studied at the "Akademie der Arbeit" (loosely, "Labour Academy"), linked to Frankfurt University. In 1925 she took another secretarial and administrative job, this time with a more overtly political flavour, working for Otto Suhr, then a young official at the "Allgemeiner freier Angestelltenbund" (AfA-Bund), a trades union umbrella organisation to which her own union, the ZdA, was affiliated. She was working at the same time with the SPD Member of Parliament (Reichstagsmitglied), Siegfried Aufhäuser.

Between October 1928 and the middle of 1933 Kern was a member of the SPD regional leadership committee for Greater Berlin and head of the "Women's Secretariat" of the local party. Meanwhile, in January 1933, the National Socialists grabbed the opportunity presented by parliamentary deadlock and a resulting political crisis to take power. They rapidly converted Germany into a one-party dictatorship and set about dealing with known activist members of (after March 1933 outlawed) rival political parties. Käthe Kern was briefly taken into protective custody during June/July 1933. Following her release she worked, between December 1933 and January 1935, as a typist for the Saar Association ("Saar-Verein") in Berlin. Between January 1935 and 1945 she was employed initially as a typist and later as a secretary by the mining conglomerate "Preußische Bergwerks- und Hütten-Aktiengesellschaft" at the company's Berlin administrative centre. She was involved in anti-fascist resistance and had contacts with the group around Wilhelm Leuschner. Details of her involvement are sparse, but it appears that she was not caught.

=== Building a political career in the Soviet occupation zone / East German ===
War ended in military defeat in May 1945. With the twelve year Nazi nightmare at an end, political parties, including the Social Democratic Party ("Sozialdemokratische Partei Deutschlands" / SPD), were no longer banned. Almost at once Kern joined the reinstated party and became a member of its national "Zentralausschuss" (approximately, "Central Committee"), based in Berlin. The western two thirds of Germany was now divided into four military occupation zones, and Berlin itself was separately divided into four separately administered sectors. Käthe Kern based herself in the eastern part of Berlin, which was administered as part of the Soviet occupation zone in Germany. In April 1946 a contentious political merger took place between what had hitherto been the Communist Party and the centre-left Social Democratic Party (SPD). The architects of the merger may have intended that it should take effect across the American, British, French and Soviet occupation zones, but in the event it gained no traction outside the Soviet zone. Within the Soviet zone Käthe Kern, who by this time had emerged as "Women's Secretary" of the SPD (at least in the east), was an enthusiastic advocate for the party merger, and as soon as it had taken effect she was one among the tens of thousands of former SPD members and the hundreds of thousands of former Communist Party members who used the pre-printed forms helpfully provided by the authorities to sign their party membership over to the new "Socialist Unity Party" ("Sozialistische Einheitspartei Deutschlands" / SED) which resulted from the merger. Still during April 1946 she was elected to membership of the "Parteivorstand", the leadership committee which after a few years had evolved into what became known as the Party Central Committee, a political body of which, by the time of her death, Käthe Kern would become one of the longest-standing members. Within the "Parteivorstand", jointly with Elli Schmidt she led the "women's secretariat" till 1949. She became a member of the newly launched [Soviet zone] Trades Union Federation ("Freier Deutsche Gewerkschaftsbund" / FDGB). She also sat, between 1946 and 1950, as an elected member of the short-lived Saxony-Anhalt state parliament ("Landtag"), although this seems to have been a relatively inactive assembly. The power structure in the Soviet occupation zone - relaunched in October 1949 as the Soviet sponsored German Democratic Republic (East Germany) - quickly became highly centralised, until in 1952 state-level government structures, including regional state parliaments, were simply eliminated.

=== Democratic Women's League ===
In 1947 Käthe Kern was a co-founder of the "Demokratischer Frauenbund Deutschlands" ("Democratic Women's League of [East] Germany" / DFD), becoming one of the movement's five honorary (unpaid) vice-presidents. Within the Leninist constitutional structure implemented during the 1920s and 1930s in the Soviet Union and now being extended to Soviet EmpireSoviet allies in middle Europe including East Germany, the ruling party was to be flanked by a number of "mass organisations": this arrangement was intended to broaden the government's legitimacy and support within the overarching one-party framework. The DFD was one of five mass organizations that received a fixed quota of seats in the East German national parliament ("Volkskammer") alongside the seats occupied by representatives of the ruling party and those allocated to the four other "bloc parties". Kern's position in the leadership cabal of the DFD conferred on her a political weight beyond that which would be associated with a "women's organisation" in a western-style democracy. She remained a member of the DFD national leadership team from 1947 till her death in 1985.

=== People's parliament ===
In terms of national parliamentary representation, Käthe Kern was a member of the "Erste Deutsche Volksrat" ("People's Assembly") which emerged from the Second People's Congress held in Berlin on 17/18 March 1948, auspiciously the centenary of the 1848 March revolution in the Prussian capital. Although 100 of the 400 "People's Assembly" seats were set aside for members from the western occupation zones, these were never allocated. Precisely 300 assembly members were allocated to members from the Soviet occupation zone, and the event was effectively choreographed by the "eastern" Socialist Unity Party. No doubt there were those who would have welcomed any opportunity to extend the government structure emerging in the Soviet zone across all four occupation zones, but in March 1948 it made sense to concentrate on what was more immediately possible. (The twelve month long Berlin Blockade by the Soviet military would commence only in June 1948.) Within the "People's Assembly" created in March 1948, precisely ten members were identified as representatives from each of four "mass organisations", one of which was the DFD. Käthe Kern was the leader of the DFD group in the assembly. Membership of the "Erste Deutsche Volksrat" ("People's Assembly") and leadership of the groupings within it seems to have been determined on the basis of some sort of election/selection process enacted at the People's Congress. In May 1949 a Third People's Congress was held in Soviet administered East Berlin at which members of a "Zweiter Deutscher Volksrat" (new "People's Assembly") were (s)elected. This time there was no provision made for members from the western occupation zones, and the overall number of seats allocated was precisely 320. As before, the DFD received precisely ten seats, one of which went to Käthe Kern. This time, however, the ten member group had two leaders in the chamber. Käthe Kern was one of them: Emmy Damerius-Koenen was the other. The presidium of the "Zweite Deutsche Volksrat" (second "People's Assembly") comprised 35 members, increased from 25 in the "Erste Deutsche Volksrat" (first "People's Assembly"). Käthe Kern was now a member of the assembly presidium. She is included in the presidium membership listing not as the representative of the DFD: that position went to her comrade Elli Schmidt. Käthe Kern was one of eight presidium members representing the ruling Socialist Unity Party itself.

The relaunch of the Soviet occupation zone as the Soviet sponsored German Democratic Republic (East Germany) on 7 October 1949 coincided with the ninth session of the "Zweite Deutsche Volksrat" (second "People's Assembly"), which at around 12.45 that same day passed a resolution transforming itself into the "Provisorische Volkskammer" ("Provisional People's Parliament" of East Germany). Essentially the members of the "Zweite Deutsche Volksrat" (s)elected in May 1949 became members of the "Provisorische Volkskammer" in October 1949, except that there were a few additional members. Membership increased from 320 to 330. Käthe Kern was still one of the ten members representing the DFD in the "parliament".

On 27 April 1950 Kern resigned her seat in the Landtag of Saxony-Anhalt. Her successor in the regional parliament was her elderly party comrade Frieda Voß, who held the seat from 27 April 1950 till the election of 15 October 1950. Käthe Kern's parliamentary future lay with the national "Volkskammer" ("People's Parliament"), of which she remained a member till 1985, and in which she led the women of the DFD parliamentary group between 1957 and 1984. (Note: Number of DFD members in the Volkskammer: 1950 - 1954: 20 DFD members out of a total of 466 in the Volkskammer 1954 - 1958: 29 DFD members out of a total of 466 in the Volkskammer 1958 - 1963: 29 DFD members out of a total of 466 in the Volkskammer 1963 - 1967: 35 DFD members out of a total of 500 in the Volkskammer 1967 - 1971: 35 DFD members out of a total of 500 in the Volkskammer 1971 - 1976: 35 DFD members out of a total of 500 in the Volkskammer 1976 - 1981: 35 DFD members out of a total of 500 in the Volkskammer 1981 - 1986: 35 DFD members out of a total of 500 in the Volkskammer 1986 - 1990: 32 DFD members out of a total of 500 in the Volkskammer......... 1990: 1 DFD member out of a total of 400 in the Volkskammer) Although western commentators frequently dismissed the "Volkskammer" as a pseudo-democratic fig-leaf pseudo-parliament, it was nevertheless an integrated element within the overall government apparatus. The fact that its more influential members tended to combine Volkskammer membership with appointments as government ministers, senior party and ministry officials, or even - as in the case of Käthe Kern - of the powerful Party Central Committee sometimes made it hard for casual observers to determine the extent to which effective political power was concentrated in the hands of the party leadership.

Between 1954 and 1958 Käthe Kern chaired the recently inaugurated parliamentary committee for Citizens' Petitions. In 1958 she was appointed to the parliamentary Constitutional Committee ("Verfassungsausschuss"), on which she continued to serve till 1963. She was a member of the parliamentary Healthcare Committee between 1963 and 1967, and of the Work and Social Policy Committee between 1967 and 1971.

=== Mother and child department ===
Käthe Kern pursued a parallel career as a senior official in the Labour and Health Ministry, in which she headed up the national "Mother and Child department" ("Hauptabteilung Mutter und Kind") between 1949 and her retirement from the ministry in 1970. She had various additional responsibilities in respect of health provision and social welfare.

=== Connections ===
Kern was involved at different stages in a number of organisations devoted to the German Democratic Republic's international relationships. Between 1958 and 1962 she served as a presidium member with the "Gesellschaft für Deutsch-Sowjetische Freundschaft" (DSF / " German–Soviet Friendship Society"). It was als in 1958 that she joined the National Executive Committee of "Volkssolidarität" ("People's Solidarity") a mass movement dedicated to providing support for old people.

=== Historical role in legalising equal rights ===
Käthe Kern played an instrumental role in legalising the equality of women and men in the constitution of East Germany and West Germany. For many years she had advocated for the legal principle that "man and woman are equal" and in 1948-1949 helped to see it anchored in the new constitution. Learning through their mutual friend, Herta Gotthelf, that this idea would be included in the East German constitution gave further encouragement to Elisabeth Selbert, one of the four female delegates to the West German Parlamentarischer Rat, who was ultimately able to see the principle anchored in Article 3 – Equality before the Law – in the Basic Law).

=== Death and celebration ===
Käthe Kern died at Berlin on 16 April 1985. She was cremated and honoured with burial at the Memorial to the Socialists (German: Gedenkstätte der Sozialisten) in the Friedrichsfelde Central Cemetery, Berlin. Her funeral was attended by relatives, "comrades in arms" and friends. Fellow members of the Party Central Committee who joined in the celebration at the cemetery included Horst Dohlus, Herbert Häber and Werner Krolikowski.

== Recognition ==
- 1954 Clara Zetkin Medal
- 1955 Patriotic Order of Merit in bronze
- 1958 Patriotic Order of Merit in silver
- 1960 Patriotic Order of Merit in gold
- 1970 Patriotic Order of Merit gold clasp
- 1975 Order of Karl Marx
- 1980 Star of People's Friendship
