= Elli Schmidt =

German communist political activist (1908–1980)

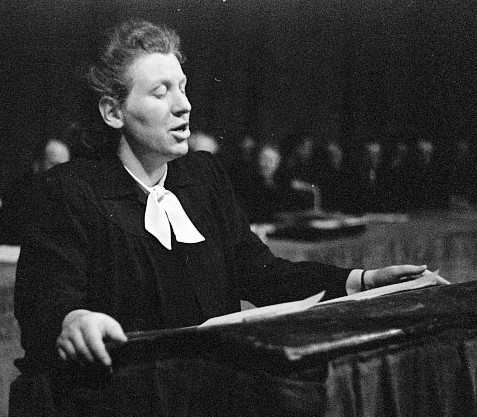

Chairwoman of the Democratic Women's League of Germany
- In office 1949 – September 1953
- Preceded by: Emmy Damerius-Koenen
- Succeeded by: Ilse Thiele

Personal details
- Born: Elli Paula Schmidt; 9 August 1908 Berlin-Wedding, German Empire
- Died: 30 July 1980 (aged 71) East Berlin, East Germany
- Party: KPD; SED
- Spouse: Anton Ackermann (1905–1973)
- Children: 1. Marianne; 2. Peter
- Occupation: Political activist, Resistance activist, politician

Elli Paula Schmidt (9 August 1908 – 30 July 1980) was a German communist political activist with links to Moscow, where as a young woman she spent most of the war years. She returned in 1945 to what later (in 1949) became the German Democratic Republic (East Germany) where she pursued a successful political career till her fall from grace: that came as part of a wider clear out of peoples critical of the national leadership in the aftermath of the 1953 uprising. She was formally rehabilitated on 29 July 1956, but never returned to mainstream politics.

In 1948 Schmidt became the first head of the Democratic Women's League ("Demokratischer Frauenbund Deutschlands" / DFD), one of several government backed mass organisations included in the highly centralised power structure then being developed for the country. Between 1950 and 1954 she was a member of the Central Committee of the ruling Socialist Unity Party ("Sozialistische Einheitspartei Deutschlands" / SED), but within the Central Committee she never progressed beyond the candidates' list for Politburo membership.

== Life ==
=== Provenance and early years ===
Elli Schmidt was born in Berlin-Wedding, an inner city district of the German capital. Her father was a police official. She attended school locally and then, between 1922 and 1926, undertook an apprenticeship in dressmaking. She worked in various Berlin fashion houses during the 1920s, and continued to be employed in the sector till 1932. She joined the "Fichte" workers' sports association in 1926 and the Young Communists in 1927. In or before 1929 she became a member of the Communist Party itself. She was a member of the local party leadership team ("Bezirksleitung") for Berlin-Brandenburg between 1929 and 1932, heading up the "Women's Department" within it during 1931/32.

=== Communist and political exile ===
Schmidt trained for party work at the Comintern's International Lenin School in Moscow between October 1932 and 1934. While she was abroad, in January 1933 the National Socialists took power and lost no time in transforming Germany into a one-party dictatorship. By the time she returned home in the Autumn 1934 the Communist Party had been banned and political activity in support of it was illegal. Many comrades had been arrested or fled abroad, and one source describes as illegal her action in returning to Germany. She continued to work illegally in Germany till 1937. In 1934 she was appointed policy-leader and trades union instructor for the underground party operation in the "Lower Rhine Region" ("Bezirk Niederrhein"). In 1935, according to one source, she even took on the leadership of the underground Communist Party for Berlin. During July/August 1935 she took part in the 7th (and final) World Congress of the Comintern (which was held in Moscow). She also participated in the German Communist Party's so-called Brussels Party Conference in October of that year. (Note: The "Brussels Conference" was held in Kuntsevo near Moscow. Reference to it at the time of planning as the Brussels Conference was intended to mislead the German authorities in the event that they might come across mention of it.) At the Brussels Conference she was elected to the party's Central Committee, remaining a member till the party itself was replaced in 1946. During the National Socialist years she was identified by a party pseudonym as "Irene Gärtner". There are indications that she was the only woman to be a member of the central committee during this period. She had to flee to Prague in 1937, and from there moved on to Paris where she worked as a member of the Central Committee Secretariat with the German party leadership in exile between 1937 and 1940. In 1940 Schmidt was one of the political refugees who transferred from Paris to Moscow: she remained in the Soviet Union till 1945. When the German Army launched their invasion in June 1941 she was evacuated to the spa settlement of Lesnoi (Krasnye Baki) on the Vetluga River, returning to Moscow in 1942 after the crisis had peaked. At one stage she worked for "Inradio". Then from Autumn 1942 she was working with the special German People's Radio ("Deutscher Volkssender") German-language radio service, later becoming "women's editor" on it. She also worked with the National Committee for a Free Germany, which was increasingly involved in planning and documenting the plans for the postwar period.

=== Anton Ackermann ===
According to one source, during her time in Moscow Elli Schmidt began to live with the comrade generally identified by his party pseudonym as Anton Ackermann, a leading member of the team that would embark on a carefully choreographed nation building programme under the leadership of Walter Ulbricht in the Soviet occupation zone after April 1945. Elsewhere it is stated that the two of them were married back in 1935 when they met as a result of their work in the Comecon. In any event, the two of them lived together as man and wife till 1949, by which time it appears they had at some point formally married. The marriage produced two children, born approximately in 1941 and 1948 respectively.

=== Mainstream politician after the war in the Soviet occupation zone / German Democratic Republic ===
Hundreds of thousands of Germans had ended up deep inside in the Soviet Union by the time the war ended in May 1945, mostly as political refugees or as prisoners of war, and for most of them it would take many months or several years before they were able to return. However, on 30 April 1945 a group of thirty men – the so-called Ulbricht Group – arrived from Moscow by plane in Berlin, keen to waste no time in implementing their project for the Soviet occupation zone, a large central chunk of what had previously been Germany, sandwiched between the three "western" occupation zones and the eastern third of what had been Germany, which was now incorporated into Poland, the Soviet Union and Czechoslovakia. Schmidt's partner, Anton Ackermann, was a leading member of that group of thirty men. Elli Schmidt herself returned to Germany in June 1945 at the same time as Wilhelm Pieck. She was still a member of the (no longer banned) Central Committee of the Communist Party of Germany. She and Ackermann were two of the sixteen (Note: The sixteen member party leadership team that signed the "appeal" consisted of fourteen men and two women.) co-signatories of the "Communist Party Appeal ... to the German people" of 11 June 1945 (still using her party pseudonym, "Irene Gärtner"). (Note: "Aufruf des Zentralkomitees der Kommunistischen Partei an das deutsche Volk zum Aufbau eines antifaschistisch-demokratischen Deutschlands" "Appeal of the Central Committee of the Communist Party to the German people for the construction of an anti-fascist democratic Germany") As party structures began to emerge, in July she became a member of the Secretariat of the Communist Party Central Committee, and she served during 1945/46 as head of the Communist Party Central Committee's Women's Committee.

She also took a leading role in the city politics of Greater Berlin. According to one source she served as a Berlin city councillor between 1946 and 1948. She chaired the main Women's Committee of the Berlin Magistrat (city administrative executive body). During 1945/46 she was a membership of the Communist Party Leadership team ("KPD-Landesleitung") for the Berlin region.

In April 1946 a contentious merger between the Communist Party of Germany and the Social Democratic Party was implemented. It was clear that the development was intended to apply across the whole of Berlin, and it is not impossible that if matters had turned out differently it would also have extended across the British, French and American occupation zones of Germany. In the event the Socialist Unity Party ("Sozialistische Einheitspartei Deutschlands" / SED) took root only in the part of the country administered as the Soviet occupation zone. As western commentators were quick to point out, over the next few years the SED itself became the ruling party in a new kind of German one-party dictatorship. Elli Schmidt was closely engaged with the project, and was indeed, with Anton Ackermann, a co-author of "Grundsätze u. Ziele der SED" ("Principles and objectives of the SED"), a programme for the new party.

Between 1946 and early 1954 Schmidt served as a member of the SED Party Executive (Partei Vorstand) and then of the Central Committee which it quite soon became. She was also a member of the party's Central Secretariat. Between April 1946 and May 1949, jointly with Katharina Kern, she headed up the party's Women's Secretariat.

Schmidt was a member of the executive board of the Democratic Women's League of (East) Germany ("Demokratischer Frauenbund Deutschlands" / DFD) from its launch in March 1947. In 1948 she became chair of the DFD's Berlin branch. The DFD was important: it was one of several government backed mass organisations included in the Leninist political structure that the country had adopted. In order to broaden the structural support and legitimacy of the government, five mass organisations - of which the DFD was one - were allocated a quota of seats in the national parliament ("Volkskammer"). East Germany's first general election took place in October 1950, almost exactly one year after the country had replaced the Soviet occupation zone. Following the election, which was organised according to the infamous "single-list" system, the DFD was allocated 20 of the 466 seats in the chamber. In May 1949 Elli Schmidt took over from Emmy Damerius-Koenen as national chair of the DFD after Damerius-Koenen had been required to relinquish the post, officially on health grounds. In 1950 Schmidt was appointed to head up the "Commission for drafting legislation on protection of mothers and children" ("Kommission zur Ausarbeitung des Gesetzes über den Mütter- und Kinderschutz"). In February 1953 she was appointed to chair the "National Commission for Commerce and Welfare" ("Staatliche Kommission für Handel und Versorgung").

Along with her national role in the DFD, Schmidt was a member of the executive and council of the Women's International Democratic Federation, an international anti-fascist umbrella organisation widely viewed as a proxy for Soviet expansionism (although the accusation has never gone entirely unchallenged), especially after it was obliged to remove its international head office from Paris and relocated to East Berlin. Elli Schmidt also served as a member of the People's Council ("Volksrat") and of the national parliament ("Volkskammer") which emerged from it between 1949 and 1954. Despite being an SED member she held one of the seats allocated to the DFD. At the Third SED Party Conference, held at the Werner Seelenbinder Sports Hall in East Berlin in July 1950, Elli Schmidt was elected a candidate for membership of the Politburo of the Central Committee.

=== The uprising and its aftermath ===
The uprising of 17 June 1953 involved more than one million people in about 700 localities. The street protests were suppressed very quickly, partly thanks to the unhestitating fraternal intervention on behalf of the forces of law and order by Soviet troops. These had been present in considerable numbers in East Germany since before the country's launch back in October 1949. The East German leadership, already unsettled by the (barely discernible on East German streets) winds of change emanating from Moscow since the death of Stalin in March 1953, suffered a crisis of confidence the extent of which has only gradually become apparent to outsiders. At least 21 people had been killed Many estimates set the number of fatalities at a far higher level. In July 1953 a dramatic politburo meeting took place, lasting through most of a long night. A number of comrades were still sufficiently shaken up by the June events to depart from their customary discretion, and openly to voice their criticisms of the Central Committee First Secretary. Although she was still only a candidate for membership, Elli Schmidt attended the meeting and was indeed one of the most forthright participants. Of the thirteen present, eleven called on Walter Ulbricht to resign. Only two spoke out in support of Ulbricht: Hermann Matern and Ulbricht's protégé, Erich Honecker. Comrade Elli Schmidt blamed herself for having "glossed over conditions [in the country] which it was a crime to have glossed over". (Note: "... beschönigte Zustände, die zu beschönigen ein Verbrechen.") "The whole spirit of out party is torn asunder". (Note: "Der ganze Geist, der in unserer Partei eingerissen ist.") "The quick fixes, the lies, the running away from people's worries, the threats, the boastings - that has brought us to this point: for that, dear Walter, you bear more culpability than anyone, and that is what you will not admit, that without all that June 17 would never have happened". (Note: "... das Schnellfertige, das Unehrliche, das Wegspringen über die Menschen und ihre Sorgen, das Drohen und Prahlen - das erst hat uns so weit gebracht, und daran, lieber Walter, hast du die meiste Schuld, und das willst du nicht eingestehen, daß es ohne alledem keinen 17. Juni gegeben hätte.")

Records of politburo meetings were not published, and Elli Schmidt's remarkable outburst only became public in June 1990, thanks to the disclosure of eyewitness testimony provided in records kept by another politburo member, Friedrich Ebert Jr., who as the son of Germany's first (socialist) president always enjoyed a certain enduring untouchability within East Germany's ruling establishment. Even if details of that politburo meeting were at that time not widely known outside the politburo, it was no secret that Elli Schmidt was a supporter of the position taken Wilhelm Zaisser and Rudolf Herrnstadt, two senior Central Committee members known to be uneasy about the extent of the links between the SED and the Communist Party of the Soviet Union. "We are not creating the Bolshevik Party", Herrnstadt had insisted (apparently to little effect) as far back as 1948, "but a very specific German party of the new type under certain historical conditions". In any imminent power struggle within the East German establishment it could therefore be assumed that the influence of the Communist Party in Moscow would be exerted in opposition to the Zaisser-Herrnstadt partnership. Ulbricht was Moscow's man and Ulbricht had long since mastered the applications of political power. Zaisser and Herrnstadt were removed from the Central Committee in July 1953 and then, six months later, excluded from the party in January 1954. Elli Schmidt, as a prominent supporter of them both, received a formal Central Committee reprimand and was removed from the Central Committee in January 1954. Elections to the politburo took place on 26 July 1953, but it turned out that Elli Schmidt's name no longer even appeared on the list of candidates for membership. She was removed from her leadership role in the DFD in September 1953. Interestingly, however, she was never expelled from the party and her fall from grace was less total (and less permanent) than that suffered by Zaisser and Herrnstadt.

=== After politics ===
Between 1954 and 1967 Elli Schmidt worked as director of the "Institut für Bekleidungskultur" (loosely, "Institute for Clothing Culture" - later renamed as the "German Fashion Institute"). The Central Committee rehabilitated her formally on 29 July 1956. After she retired in 1966 or 1967 she continued to live in East Berlin, which is where she died in 1980.

== Awards and honours ==
- 1965 Patriotic Order of Merit
- 1965 Patriotic Order of Merit gold honor clasp
- 1978 Order of Karl Marx
