= Kolonne =

Kolonne (German: convoy, column) was a gigantic logistic operation of the Soviet occupation administration in eastern Germany, first of the Soviet Military Administration in Germany (Sowjetische Militäradministration in Deutschland - SMAD, Советская военная администрация в Германии - SVAG), which then turned into the Soviet Control Commission in Germany (Sowjetische Kontrollkommission - SKK, Советская контрольная комиссия в Германии) - the robbery movement of all raw materials, equipment, and factories to the Soviet Union. In the 1940s, the operation was carried out by two branches of the Soviet Administration - Reparations and Supply Department (Отдел по репарациям и поставкам) and the Transport Department (Транспортный отдел) in Berlin-Karlshorst, at Gundelfinger Straße 38 (1945–1946), in Wendenschloß (1946–1949), and again in Berlin-Karlshorst at Treskowallee (1949-). Then the divisions were given the rank of boards. In 1948, 52 people performed direct supervision over this type of transport, consisting of 13 convoys (x 30 locomotives).

Of the Allied Forces that took part in the defeat of Nazi Germany, war reparations were only enforced by the Soviet Union. The railways, which should have played a major role in the post-war economic reconstruction, were treated particularly brutally. Not only locomotives and wagons were taken away, many secondary lines of the German DR (Deutsche Reichsbahn) were also liquidated, a number of main lines (previously double-track) became single-track, traction and signaling networks were dismantled.

== The course of the operation ==
Transporting this enormous tonnage of reparations (or, as some historians and publicists define the spoils of war) was the first, if not the most important, task of the Soviet occupation authorities. This operation was carried out during the ubiquitous post-war chaos. A radical but effective solution was used, and the DR was involved. Virtually in one night, the so-called Kolonne (translated from German as convoys), entrusted with the transport of equipment from eastern Germany through Poland to the Soviet border.

The scale of the project is evidenced by the data that, for example, in May 1946, out of the total number of 2,716 active locomotives, as many as 800 locomotives, i.e. almost 1/3, were directed to service convoys. Statistics for the period 1948–1949 are lost, but there are estimates that between 1945 and 1953 German personnel and equipment made more than 20,000 (return) journeys, each of 10–14 days.

This practice continued until the end of 1953, four years after the theoretically independent subject of international law was created - the German Democratic Republic; passenger transport (passenger colony no. 42) until 1955.

== Information about the action ==
Information on convoys appeared occasionally in the West German railway specialist press, but it was occasional, random. Official data on this subject were never published by East Germany or the Soviets, and the breakthrough came only when the archives were released after the fall of the Berlin Wall in 1989.

In 1998 the first monograph on this subject was published by the Transpress publishing house in Stuttgart, entitled "Kolonne. Die Deutsche Reichsbahn im Dienste der Sowjetunion" (Convoys. Deutsche Reichsbahn in the service of the Soviet Union). The book includes, among others list of locomotives used in convoys.

== Bibliography ==
- Michael Reimer, Lothar Meyer, Vollmer Kubitzki: Kolonne. Die Deutsche Reichsbahn im Dienste der Sowjetunion, transpress Verlag Stuttgart 1998, ISBN 3-613-71080-3
- Я. Фойтцик, А. В. Доронин, Т. В. Царевская-Дякина: Советская военная администрация в Германии, 1945-1949. Справочник, РОССПЭН Moscow 2009
