= Dorit Schmiel =

German seamstress who died at the Berlin wall (1941–1962)

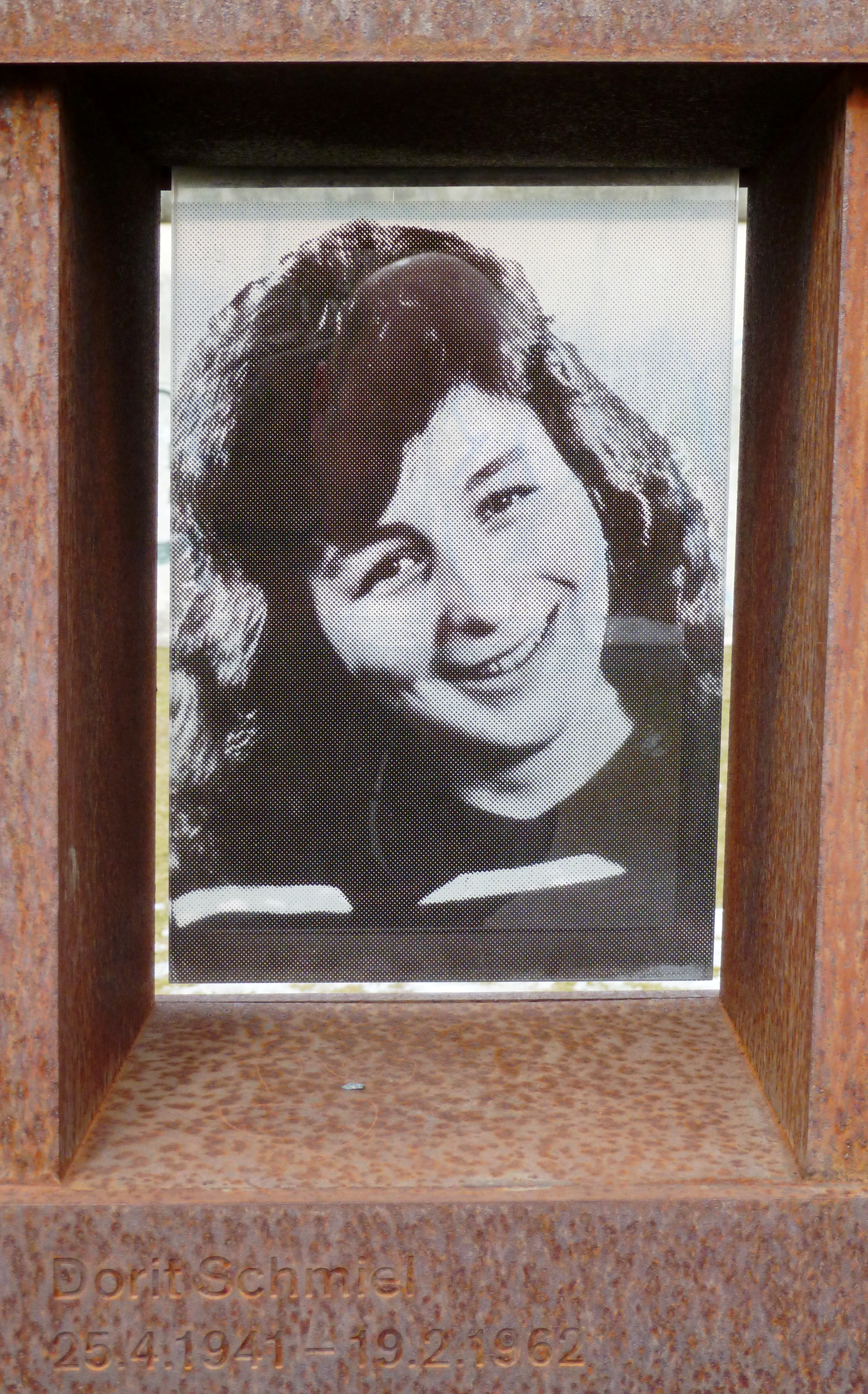
- Born: 25 April 1941; Berlin, Nazi Germany
- Died: 19 February 1962 (aged 20); East Berlin, East Germany
- Cause of death: Gunshot wound to the abdomen
- Body discovered: East Berlin - near Wilhelmsruher Damm
- Monuments: Window of Remembrance, Berlin
- Known for: 1 of 8 women who died at the Berlin Wall; the second youngest woman to die at the Berlin wall

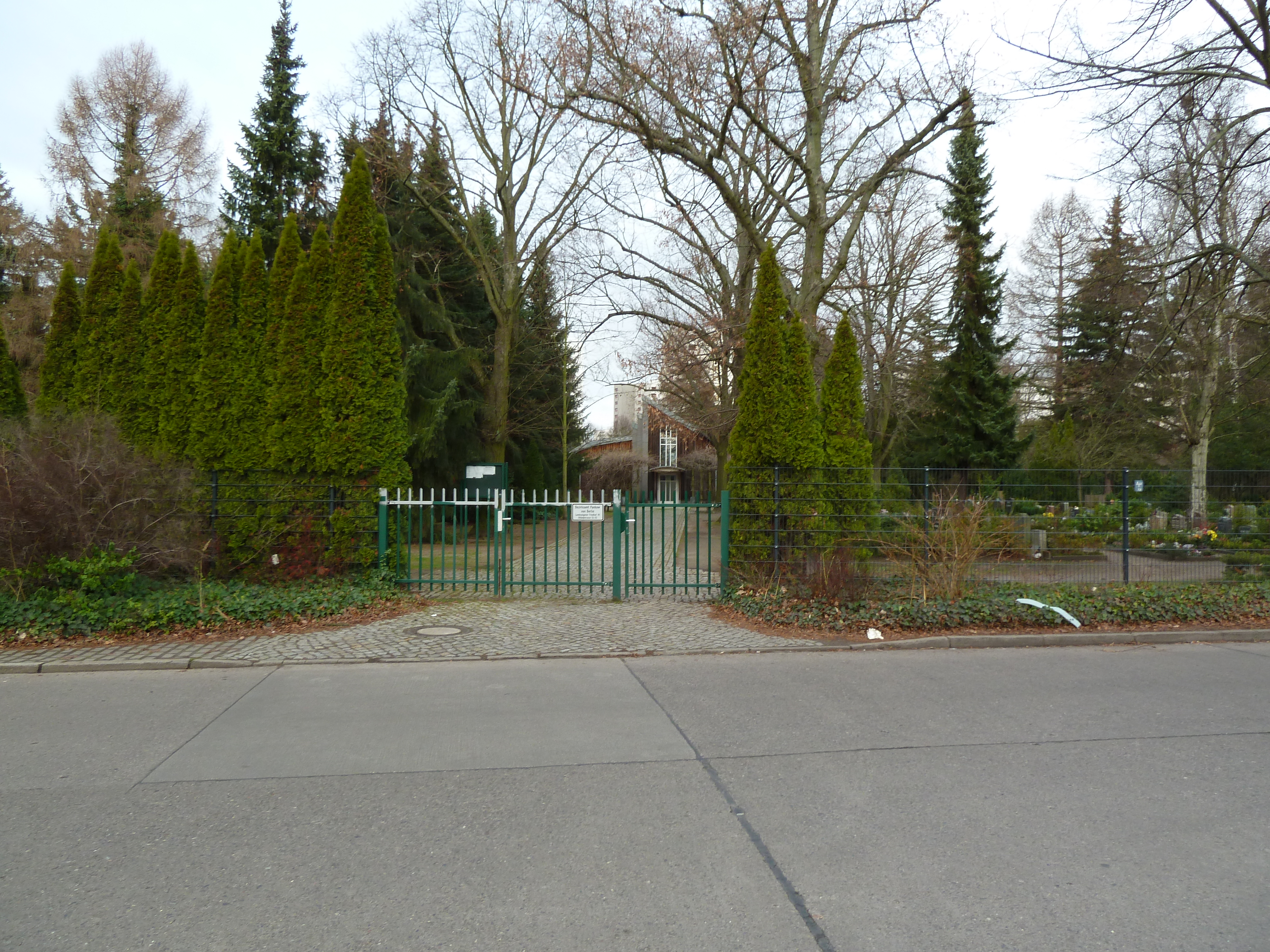
Entrance to Friedhof Pankow VII. This is where Dorit Schmiel and her party attempted their escape to West Berlin in 1962.

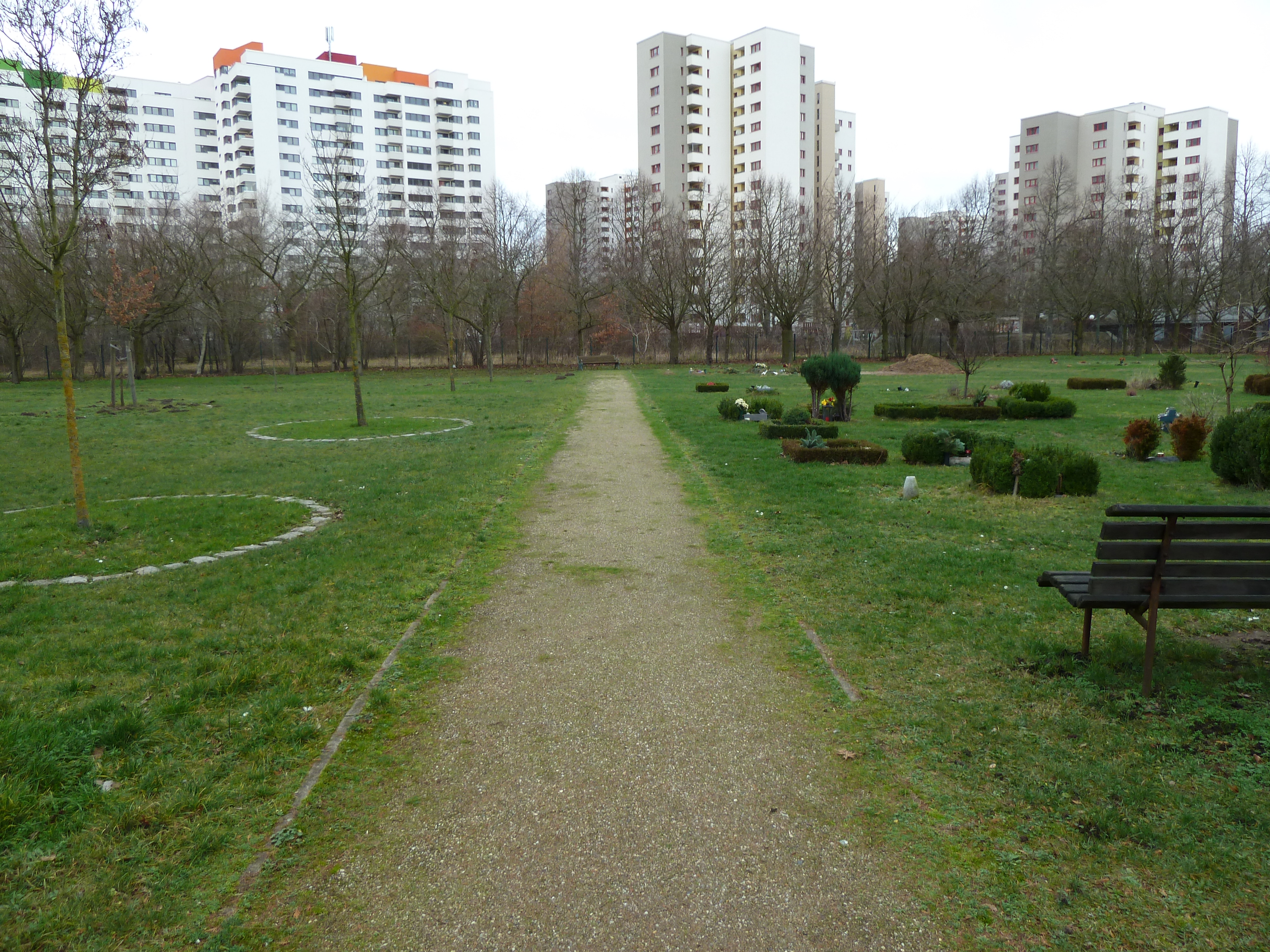
Former Todestreifen (death strip), from East Berlin to West Berlin. This is where Dorit Schmiel and her party attempted their escape to West Berlin in 1962.

Dorit Schmiel (April 25, 1941 – February 19, 1962) was a German seamstress who became the thirteenth known person to die at the Berlin Wall. Schmiel was fatally shot by East German border guards while attempting to escape from East Berlin to West Berlin with a group of friends, including her fiancé. Schmiel was one of only eight women to die at the Berlin Wall, and at 20 years old was the second youngest woman victim.

== Biography ==
Dorit Schmiel was born on April 25, 1941, in Berlin, Nazi Germany, during the Second World War, in which her father died as a soldier. Schmiel and her older brother were raised by her mother and step-father in the East Berlin district of Pankow. By the time Schmiel was 20 years old, she had moved in with her fiancé, Detlef Teuchert, and worked as a seamstress in a state-run manufacturing company in Pankow. Ever since she was a child, she traveled regularly to West Berlin to visit relatives, go shopping, watch movies, or go dancing. On 13 August 1961, East German authorities abruptly sealed off the sector border, and began construction of the Berlin Wall. The subsequent loss of freedom to visit the west was a painful turning point in her life. Together with three friends: brothers Eberhard Brede and Dietrich Brede, and Dietrich's girlfriend, Brigitte Kießling, they decided early in 1962 to attempt to escape to West Berlin. The group had felt dissatisfaction with the political situation in East Germany and by then it had become apparent that the division of Berlin would be long-term. They decided on a place in the northern part of East Berlin, where Schmiel's cousin had previously escaped.

== Death ==
On February 19, 1962, after midnight on a misty and cloudy night, the five friends approached the border to West Berlin's Reinickendorf district from the east side at Rosenthal, in Pankow. After observing the movement of the East German border guards, they sneaked through a cemetery known today as "Friedhof Pankow VII" to its back fence, which also comprised the inner fence of the border security strip. Using wire cutters they cut a hole in the first fence, and one after another crawled through the hole, and through the snow towards the outer border fences. They had almost reached the outer fence across the Berlin Wall's "death-strip" when border guards noticed them and began shooting at them, hitting Schmiel in the abdomen. The gunshot caused her to cry out, and only then did the guards stop firing and approached the group. The remaining four surrendered, and obeyed the order to stand up, but Schmiel remained on the ground bleeding profusely, and crying in pain. She was transported to the Krankenhaus der Volkspolizei (People's Police Hospital) in Mitte, where she died later that same night.

== Burial ==
Dorit Schmiel was buried on March 2, 1962, in Section 29B of the cemetery known today as "Friedhof Pankow III", in Schönholz, Niederschönhausen. Like Friedhof Pankow VII, where the escape attempt took place, Friedhof Pankow III is also on the border to Reinickendorf. Supplementary forces of the People's Police virtually sealed off the funeral, preventing the participation of many mourners from Niederschönhausen. As of 2012, her grave no longer exists.

== Aftermath ==
The other escapees were interrogated for hours that same night and were tried a month later, where they were indicted for "an act that seriously endangered society" and which could have endangered peace by inciting "provocations from the class enemy." The Pankow district court sentenced them to prison terms ranging from ten months to two years.

Thirty years later, Dorit Schmiel's friends acted as witnesses and joint plaintiffs in the trial of the three border guards (Hans-Jürgen D., Rainer R., and Horst B.) who had shot at the group, killing Schmiel and wounding Eberhard Brede. It was not possible to determine which guard had fired the shots that killed Dorit Schmiel and wounded Eberhard Brede, and because they were all under 21 at the time, they were tried in a youth criminal court in Moabit, and found guilty of joint manslaughter in coincidence with attempted manslaughter, and sentenced to 18 months in prison, which was commuted to probation.

== See also ==
- List of deaths at the Berlin Wall
- Berlin Crisis of 1961

== Literature ==
- Christine Brecht: Dorit Schmiel, in: Die Todesopfer an der Berliner Mauer 1961–1989. Ein biographisches Handbuch. Links, Berlin 2009, ISBN 978-3-86153-517-1, p. 70–72
