= Anne-Marie Durand-Wever =

German gynaecologist (1889–1970)

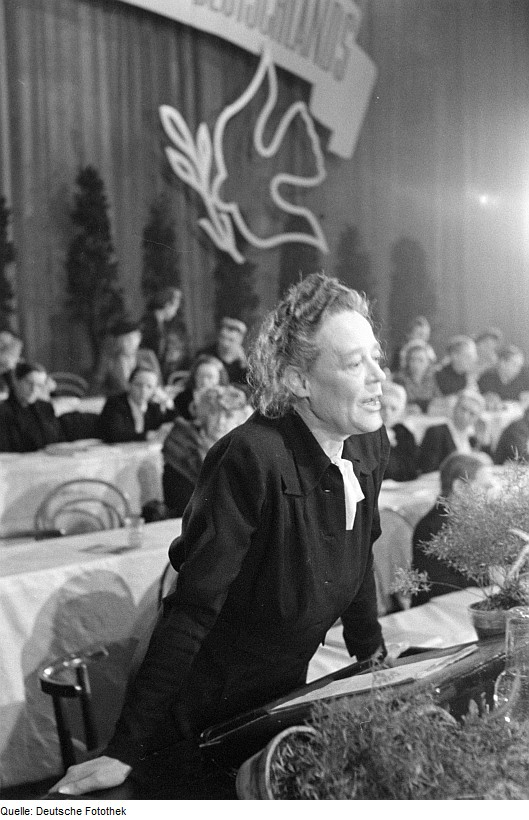
- Durand-Wever in 1947

Chairwomen of the Democratic Women's League of Germany
- In office 1947–1948
- Preceded by: position established
- Succeeded by: Emmy Damerius-Koenen

Personal details
- Born: October 30, 1889 Paris, French Third Republic
- Died: September 14, 1970 (aged 80) Overath, West Germany
- Spouse: Wilhelm Durand
- Children: Ernst-August Durand-Wever; Anne-Marie Durand-Wever
- Education: Ludwig-Maximilians-Universität München; University of Chicago

Anne-Marie Durand-Wever (born Anne-Marie Wever: 30 October 1889 – 14 September 1970) was a German gynaecologist and co-founder of Pro Familia, the German branch of the International Planned Parenthood Federation.

== Life ==
Anne-Marie Wever's father, Walther Wever, was a diplomat and her childhood was correspondingly peripatetic. She was born in Paris and grew up successively in Bulgaria, Romania, Brazil and the United States. She had a younger sister and a brother who died in infancy. Her mother, born Anne-Marie von Harbou, is also known to have suffered two late-stage miscarriages. Anne-Marie Wever later recalled of her childhood that most of her early memories involved not her mother but her father, because of her mother's poor health.

Until she was ten, she was "home-schooled". She attended school in Chicago, completing her studies at the University School for Girls in 1907 before moving on to study Chemistry. She received a Bachelor of Science degree from the University of Chicago in 1910. Between 1910 and 1915, she studied medicine at Marburg University, the University of Strasbourg and the Ludwig-Maximilians-Universität München (LMU), passing her state exams on 30 May 1915 and receiving her medical doctorate in 1917, ten days before the birth of her first child. She then worked as an assistant doctor at LMU's Women's Clinic (and elsewhere), specialising in gynaecology.

On 30 December 1916, Anne-Marie Wever married Wilhelm Durand, an architect. Their children, Ernst-August and Anne-Marie, were born in Munich, respectively in 1917 and 1924. A rumour exists that Durand-Wever suffered hearing difficulties following the birth of her first child, and that her hearing was liable to be further damaged through further pregnancies, which gave her a personal interest in pregnancy prevention.

Throughout the 1920s, Durand-Wever was active in women's organisations. In Munich, she had already founded, and during the First World War chaired, the regional grouping of Women Doctors Associations ("Landesgruppe Bayern des deutschen Ärztinnenbundes"). In 1927, she set up her own medical practice in Berlin-Schöneberg. That same year she opened a "Confidential Centre for engaged and married people" ("Vertrauenstelle für Verlobte und Eheleute") and became increasingly prominent as an advocate of improved sex education for girls. The context was one in which each year, during the 1920s and 1930s, approximately 10,000 women were dying in Germany as a result of illegal abortions. Towards the end of the 1920s she formed a friendship with Margaret Sanger, a "founder of the birth control movement" in the United States. During this time she was also collaborating with the feminist journalist Ilse Reicke on "Mutter- und Kinderland", a magazine targeting mothers. In 1930 she was one of 356 doctors who signed a submission to the sentencing committee of the Reichstag calling for a reform of §218 (the abortion section) of the criminal code.

The political backdrop changed dramatically in January 1933 when the Nazi party seized power and lost no time in converting Germany into a one- party dictatorship. Anne-Marie Durand-Wever was excluded from the Reich Chamber of Literature because of her contrarian views on "social hygiene" and education. She later recalled that she was forbidden to publish. In 1938 several of her books, covering themes such as sex education, birth control and contraception appeared on the official list of damaging and undesirable publications. Nevertheless, as early as 1933 her publisher reissued her booklet "Pregnancy Prevention" ("Verhütung der Schwangerschaft"): the text was unchanged, but the title had been changed to "Race hygiene, sterilisation and descendant restriction" ("Rassenhygiene, Sterilisation und Nachkommensbeschränkung"). According to one source the Office for Public Health withdrew her authorisation on 12 October 1937. She nevertheless remained in Germany, sustained her private medical practice and continued to provide birth-control advice.

War ended in May 1945 together with the Nazi regime and Durand-Wever resumed her public role. She chaired the committee that prepared the way for the foundation of the Democratic Women's League ("Demokratischer Frauenbund Deutschlands" / DFD), which was formally established in March 1947. With what remained of Germany divided into four military occupation zones the DFD was apparently viewed with equanimity or favour by all the occupying powers, and she held high office within it. Increasingly, however, it became a creature of the newly formed ruling Socialist Unity Party (SED) in the Soviet occupation zone (after 1949 East Germany): it was subsequently banned entirely in what became, after 1949, West Germany. In 1949 or early 1950 Durand-Wever resigned all her offices with the DFD on grounds of overwork and health, and later in 1950 she left the organisation.

At the end of 1952, she was a co-founder in Kassel of the "German Society for family planning and sex education and counselling" ("Deutschen Gesellschaft für Familienplanung, Sexualpädagogik und Sexualberatung" - also known as "Pro Familia"), serving as its deputy chair. In addition, she worked for its international counterpart, the International Planned Parenthood Federation.

During her final years Anne-Marie Durand-Wever continued to live in West Berlin. However, when she died on 14 September 1970, it was at her son's home in Overath-Heiligenhaus, just outside Cologne on its eastern side.
