= DWK =

- German Economic Commission, (German: Deutsche Wirtschaftskommission)
- German company for the reprocessing of nuclear fuel, (German: Deutsche Gesellschaft für Wiederaufarbeitung von Kernbrennstoffen)
