= German People's Congress =

Meetings of German political parties during Allied occupation

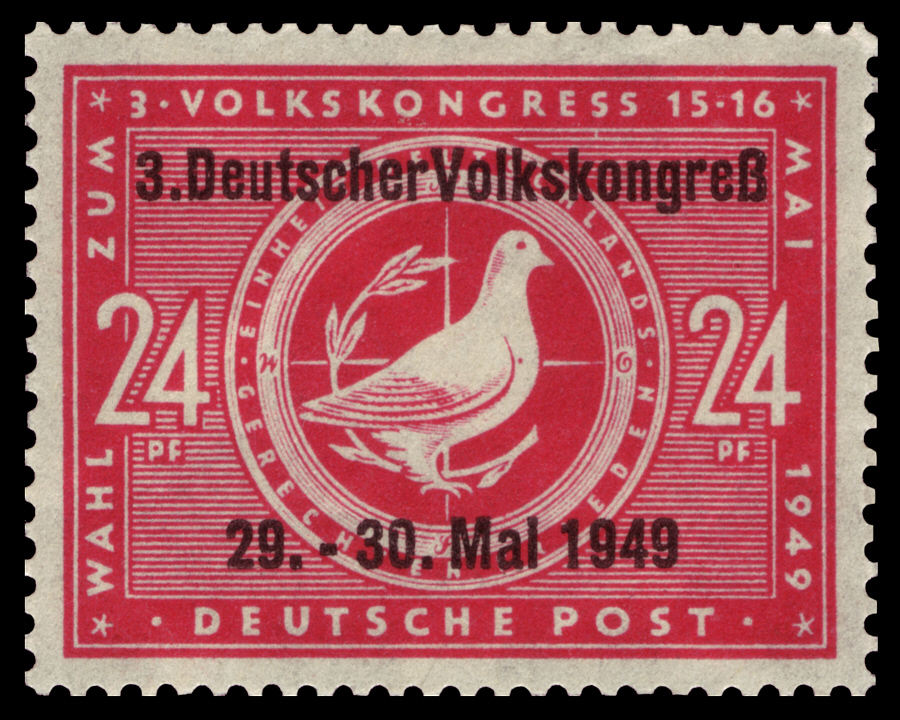
Special stamp for the meeting of the 3rd People's Congress (Soviet Occupation Zone, 1949)

The German People's Congress (German: Deutscher Volkskongress) were a series of congresses held in Allied-occupied Germany by the Socialist Unity Party (SED) and the Democratic Bloc from 1947 to 1949. Delegates from all over Germany gathered to establish a German government, and the German People's Council served as a constitutional convention. The People's Congresses were dominated by members of the SED, and the success of the London Six-Power Conference limited their influence to the Soviet Occupation Zone. They resulted in the founding of the German Democratic Republic in October 1949.

== Background ==
After the Second World War, the cooperation of the four victorious Allied powers in occupied Germany was soon superseded by the start of the Cold War. The growing East-West conflict between the Western powers (the United States, the United Kingdom, and France) and the Soviet Union caused a breakdown of bipartisanship in negotiations over the creation of a post-occupation Germany. The Soviet practice of installing puppet regimes in the Central and Eastern European countries occupied by the Red Army had caused the Western powers to distrust the Soviets in relation to policy in Germany. Likewise, the Soviets feared that Germany could fall into the Western sphere of influence. American demands in the Allied Control Council, to preserve the economic unity of Germany, were dismissed in July 1946 by the Soviets as an attempt to gain influence. Western and Soviet interests in Germany had diverged and were increasingly irreconcilable, causing the negotiations to stall as both sides were suspicious of each other. The four-power administration over Germany ended no later than the last meeting of the Supervisory Council on 20 March 1948.

The London 6-Power Conference was held by the three Western powers and three Benelux countries in the first half of 1948 to set out principles for the establishment of a democratic German state. The resulting Frankfurt Documents were recommendations for a constitutional convention for Germany given to politicians in the Western Trizone. The Soviet Union was not invited to the conference and, in response, withdrew from the Allied Control Council and concentrated on the Soviet Occupation Zone. This included endorsing the German People's Congress, a parallel series of constitutional conventions of the Socialist Unity Party of Germany (SED), the communist party supported by the Soviets in their zone.

== People's Congress movement ==
The People's Congress movement was an initiative of the SED founded in 1947, and served as its first political forum for Germany to incorporate elements of direct democracy and civic groups in a representative government. They also used the SED to the involvement of political parties, mass organizations, cultural associations and individuals to achieve their political goals and was directed against the American and British policy and the Marshall Plan. Emerged from the movement of the German people's congresses, the first on 6/7 December 1947 of "delegates" of all occupation zones was composed. Prohibited under review and resistances against these SED initiative on the part of the Christian Democratic Union, and the removal of its chairman Jakob Kaiser and Ernst Lemmer through SMAD Western occupying powers to mobilize the People's Congresses in the Western "Trizonia".

== First congress ==
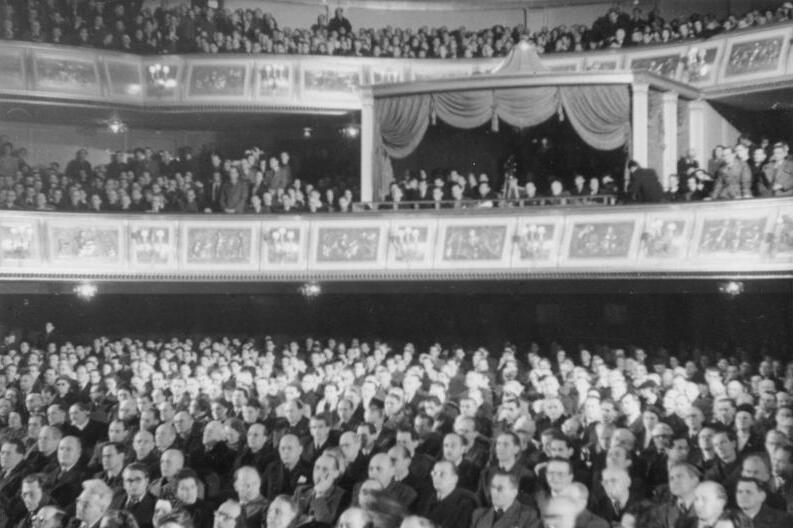
Participants of the first People's Congress, Admiralspalast, Berlin

The First German People's Congress for Unity and a Just Peace was convened on the initiative of the SED. Delegates from political parties and mass organizations elected largely from the Soviet zone of occupation, with only a small proportion coming from the Western zones. The representatives met on 6 and 7 December 1947 in Berlin. Participation in the People's Congress was a source of much discussion among the parties in the Soviet zone. The refusal of the CDU to participate was one of the reasons that led to the dismissal of Jacob Kaiser as CDU chairman by the SMAD. Under strong pressure from the Soviets power and against the will of the majority of national associations, the Liberal Democratic Party decided to participate.

The Congress was criticized for the fact it was not composed according to the election results. Since it included the mass organizations, it had a higher proportion of members from the SED, who were usually also members of mass organizations. According to estimates by Erich Gniffke, most members of the mass organizations participated in the SED. Although these estimates are at odds with the official figures, it is clear that the SED had a clear majority in the People's Congress.

Topics included the rejection of the planned construction of a West German state and the criticism of the US-British occupation policy. The Congress also discussed the preparation of a peace treaty and an all-German government "composed of representatives of all democratic parties".

== Second congress ==
The Second German People's Congress was held on the 17th and 18th March 1948, the 18th March being the 100th anniversary of the German revolutions of 1848–1849. The Congress was attended by 1898 delegates, including 512 from the western zones. It rejected both the Marshall Plan and the Oder-Neisse line, and agreed to hold a German reunification petition campaign, which took place from 23 May to 13 June 1948.

Furthermore, the First German People's Council was elected, which included 400 members, of which 100 were from West Germany. It formed a constitutional committee led by Otto Grotewohl and tasked with drawing up a draft constitution for the future German Democratic Republic.

== Third congress ==
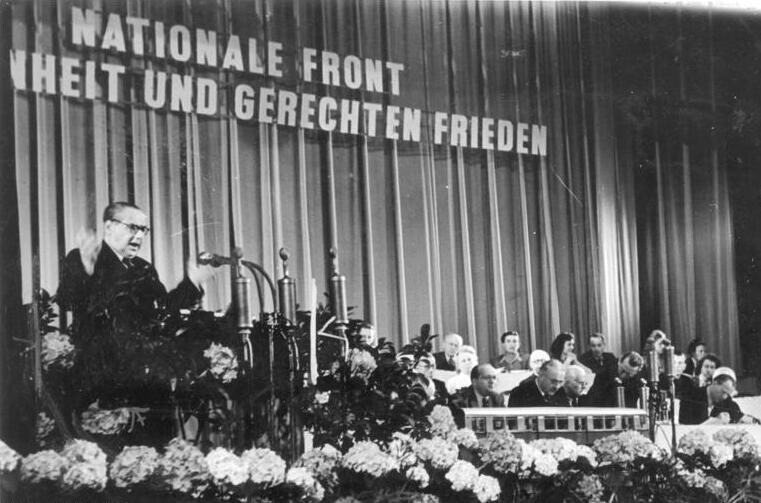
Hermann Kastner address the third People's Congress in Admiralspalast, Berlin, 1949

The Third German People's Congress on the population of the Soviet occupation zone 15 and 16 May 1949 by one vote confirms'. The 'choice' for the People's Congress was to assent (Yes) or reject (No), the following statement:

"I am in favor of German unity and a just peace agreement. I agree about the following list of candidates for the Third German People's Congress."

More than four million of the approximately 13.5 million eligible voters have ticked no. On the approval (officially about 66% of votes) are still reasonable doubt, as about a million unfilled ballots were counted as agreement.

On 29–30 May 1949 the German People's Congress convened in Berlin. 1400 delegates came from the Soviet occupation zone, 610 from the western zones (Trizone) located on 23 May was constituted as a federal republic. The draft Constitution, the Constitutional Committee of the People's Council had been drawn up on 30 May approved with one vote against, selected and the Second German People's Council. The People's Council was constituted under the influence of the founding of the Federal Republic of Germany (May 23, 1949) on the same day as the Provisional People's Chamber, on 7 October 1949, together with the formal establishment of the German Democratic Republic.

== See also ==
- German Economic Commission
- German People's Council
- People's Control Commission
- Merger of the KPD and SPD into the Socialist Unity Party of Germany
