= Emmy Damerius-Koenen =

East German politician (1903–1987)

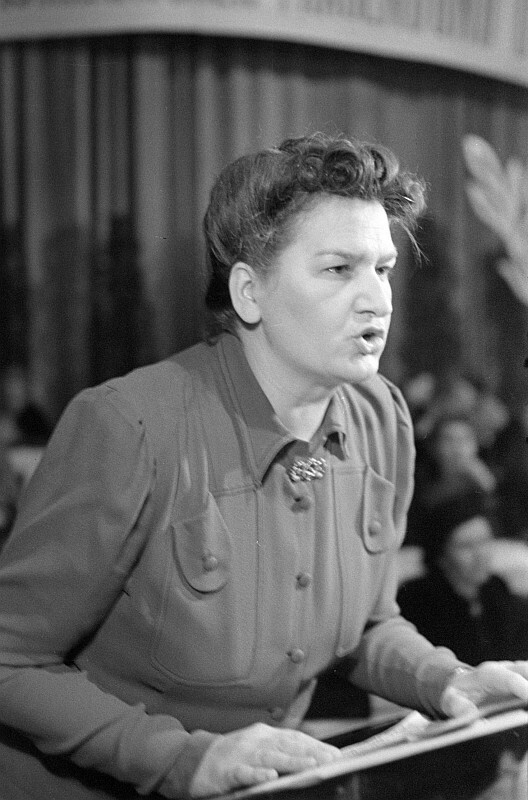

Chairwoman of the Democratic Women's League of Germany
- In office 1948–1949
- Preceded by: Anne-Marie Durand-Wever
- Succeeded by: Elli Schmidt

Personal details
- Born: Emma Zadach; 15 March 1903 Berlin-Rosenthal, German Empire
- Died: 21 May 1987 (aged 84) East Berlin, East Germany
- Party: KPD; SED
- Occupation: Political activist, politician

Emmy Damerius-Koenen (15 March 1903 – 21 May 1987) was an East German politician. She was married to Helmut Damerius from 1922 to 1927 and later, was married to Wilhelm Koenen. She was a member of the Communist Party of Germany and spent most of the Nazi era outside Germany, in the Soviet Union and other countries. She returned to Germany in December 1945, where she was active in East German women's organizations.

== Biographical details ==
Damerius-Koenen was born Emma Zadach to working class parents in Berlin-Rosenthal. She was one of four children. After attending Volksschule, she took classes at an evening trade school. She then worked as a shop clerk at Heymann & Schmidt GmbH Berlin, an art printer; she was later employed at other printers. In 1922, she and Helmut Damerius were married and were active with the Friends of Nature and pacifists. In 1923, she joined the Communist Youth Association of Germany, and in 1924, the Communist Party of Germany (Kommunistische Partei Deutschlands, or KPD). She and Damerius had one child, who died when very young. She and Damerius were divorced in 1927.

Until 1934, she worked as a full-time volunteer for the district leadership of the Berlin-Brandenburg KPD, first as a political worker and then as leader of the women's division. After the Nazi Party seized power in 1933, the KPD and other opposition parties were outlawed, making such work illegal. In 1934, learning that she was on a Gestapo list, she went to Moscow and worked in the Women's Secretariat of the Communist International. In 1935 and 1936, she attended the Communist University of the National Minorities of the West in Moscow using her cadre name, Emmy Dublin. She had been living with Leo Scharko, a Polish communist. In 1936, he was arrested in the Great Purge and came back a few weeks later, humorless and tense. Although he didn't reveal much about his confinement, Damerius-Koenen apparently deduced he had agreed to denounce others. After the university was closed, she was sent to work with the Party leadership in Paris, Prague and Zurich. From Paris, she and Scharko corresponded, although with precautions such as invisible ink and cover addresses. Learning that the verity of Scharko's academic background was being challenged because of a lack of documentation in his cadre file, she managed to acquire a copy of the missing degree, which she forwarded to Scharko. Rather than prove his credentials, however, the document was taken as substantiation that Scharko had connections in Nazi Germany, a deadly serious charge in the Soviet Union at that time. As Damerius-Koenen later wrote, "Since 1937, there has been no trace of Leo Scharko."

She and Wilhelm Koenen were married in 1937 and lived in Prague. In January 1939, they emigrated to England and she worked in London. In 1940, she was interned as an "enemy alien" on the Isle of Man, where she stayed until her release in February 1941. In 1943, she was a founding member of the Free German Movement (Freie Deutsche Bewegung, or FDB) in London and in 1944, she was one of the initiators of the Women's Commission of the FDB.

She and Koenen returned to Germany in December 1945. She worked as an editor in Halle and Dresden. On her return, she was committed to the creation of local Women's Committees and in 1946, she became the vice chairwoman of the Saxon Women's Committee.

Damerius-Koenen played a dominant role in the preparatory committee to found the Demokratischer Frauenbund Deutschlands (DFD). She gave the keynote address at the German Women's Congress for Peace on 7–9 March 1947 at the Admiralspalast in Berlin. The Women's Congress was also the founding congress for the DFD, of which, Damerius-Koenen became the vice chair. In April 1948, she replaced the organization's chairwoman, Anne-Marie Durand-Wever, who was not aligned with a political party; Damerius-Koenen was elected chairwoman at the 29–30 May 1948 DFD national congress. Her international experience was helpful in getting the DFD accepted into the Women's International Democratic Federation, which had been established in Paris in 1945 by communists and anti-fascists.

In spring 1949, she was forced to relinquish the DFD chair, the result of a 1949 decision by the Socialist Unity Party of Germany (SED) regarding western emigration and internal struggles with the SED Women's Secretariat, under the leadership of Elli Schmidt and Käthe Kern. Schmidt became head of the DFD in May 1949.

From 1950 to 1958, Damerius-Koenen worked as an editor, team leader and assistant chief editor at the Berlin publishing house, Verlag Die Wirtschaft. After 1958, she worked as a freelance journalist and she worked for her husband until his death in October 1963. She wrote many articles in the women's press of the Soviet occupation zone and many detailed memories regarding the history of the SED and the DFD.

Damerius-Koenen died on 21 May 1987 in the Friedrichshagen district of East Berlin and her ashes are buried in the "Pergolenweg" of the Socialists' Memorial at the cemetery, Zentralfriedhof Friedrichsfelde.

== Sources ==
- Catherine Epstein, The Last Revolutionaries: German Communists and Their Century, President and Fellows of Harvard College (2003), ISBN 0-674-01045-0
- Emmy Damerius, "Erinnerungen. Exil in England" In: Beiträge zur Geschichte der deutschen Arbeiterbewegung, Heft (4/1978) (in German)
- Emmy Damerius-Koenen, "Über die antifaschistische Frauenarbeit in Sachsen in den Jahren 1946/47" In: Beiträge zur Geschichte der deutschen Arbeiterbewegung, Special edition (1965/66) (in German)
- Helmut Damerius, Unter falscher Anschuldigung, Aufbau Verlag Berlin (1990), p. 284ff (in German)
- Die ersten Jahre. Erinnerungen, Dietz Verlag Berlin (1979), p. 258ff (in German)
- Im Zeichen des roten Sterns. Erinnerungen, Dietz Verlag Berlin (1974), p. 249ff (in German)
- Bundesarchiv SAPMO SgY30/1308/1
