= Lothar Kolditz =

German chemist and politician (1929–2025)

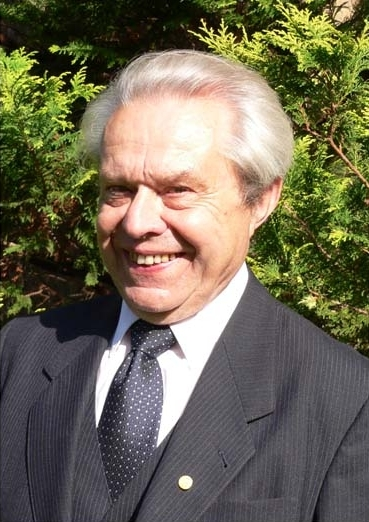
- Kolditz in 2007

President of the National Front of the German Democratic Republic
- In office 1981 – 20 February 1990
- Preceded by: Erich Correns
- Succeeded by: Office abolished

Member of the Volkskammer
- In office 8 June 1986 – 18 March 1990

Personal details
- Born: 30 September 1929 Zschorlau, Saxony, Germany
- Died: 7 May 2025 (aged 95) Steinförde, Brandenburg, Germany
- Education: Humboldt University of Berlin
- Occupation: Chemist
- Awards: Outstanding Scientist of the People (1989); Patriotic Order of Merit, in Gold (1984); Clemens Winkler Medal (1976); National Prize of the German Democratic Republic, 3rd Class (1972)

Lothar Kolditz (30 September 1929 – 7 May 2025) was a German chemist and politician. He was president of the National Front of the German Democratic Republic.

== Background ==
Kolditz was born in the municipality of Zschorlau on 30 September 1929, the son of the carpenter Paul Kolditz and his wife Ella, née Bauer. From 1941 to 1948, he attended high school in Aue.

Kolditz studied chemistry from 1948 to 1952 at the Humboldt University of Berlin, graduating with a degree in chemistry. His undergraduate thesis "Über Kaliumborfluoridtetraschwefeltrioxyd und die Darstellung von Trisulfurylfluorid“ (About potassium borofluoride tetrasulfur trioxide and the preparation of trisulphuryl fluoride) was written under the guidance of Hans-Albert Lehmann.

In 1954, he also received his doctorate with his dissertation "About Polyarsenatophosphate" under the supervision of Erich Thilo. Kolditz then habilitated in 1957 with a thesis "On compounds of pentavalent phosphorus, arsenic and antimony with fluorine and chlorine".

Kolditz was married to Ruth, née Schramm, since 1951; the couple had two daughters and lived in Steinförde (a district of Fürstenberg). He died on 7 May 2025, at the age of 95.

== Academic career ==
In 1957, Kolditz was appointed a professor at the Technical University of Leuna-Merseburg; where he would teach inorganic and radiochemistry. After Franz Hein retired, Kolditz was appointed to the Friedrich Schiller University in Jena in 1959. There he was the director of the Inorganic Chemistry Institute until 1962.

In 1962, Kolditz returned to the Humboldt University of Berlin, initially as a chair and director of the First Chemical Institute (1962–68). From 1965 to 1968, he was also Vice-Rector for Natural Sciences at the university. In 1969, he was elected as a corresponding member of the German Academy of Sciences at Berlin. After the reforms at the university in 1968, he became Humboldt University's director of chemistry from 1971 to 1979. In 1972, he was elected a full member of the Academy of Sciences of the German Democratic Republic (formerly the German Academy of Sciences at Berlin, which was renamed that year).

From 1980 to 1990, Kolditz worked at the academy as director of the Central Institute for Inorganic Chemistry (ZIAC) in Berlin. The ZIAC was created in 1971 by merging the Institute for Inorganic Chemistry, founded in 1952, and the Institute for Applied Silicate Research, founded in 1951. The Academy of Sciences of the German Democratic Republic and the ZIAC were dissolved on 31 December 1991, due to the reunification of Germany. As a result, Kolditz retired and lived in Fürstenberg ever afterwards.

Kolditz's publishing activities include around 350 original publications in academic journals, 37 patents and well over 200 colloquium lectures. He was a long-standing member of the editorial board of several journals. Kolditz continued to contribute to scientific publications during his retirement.

== Political career ==
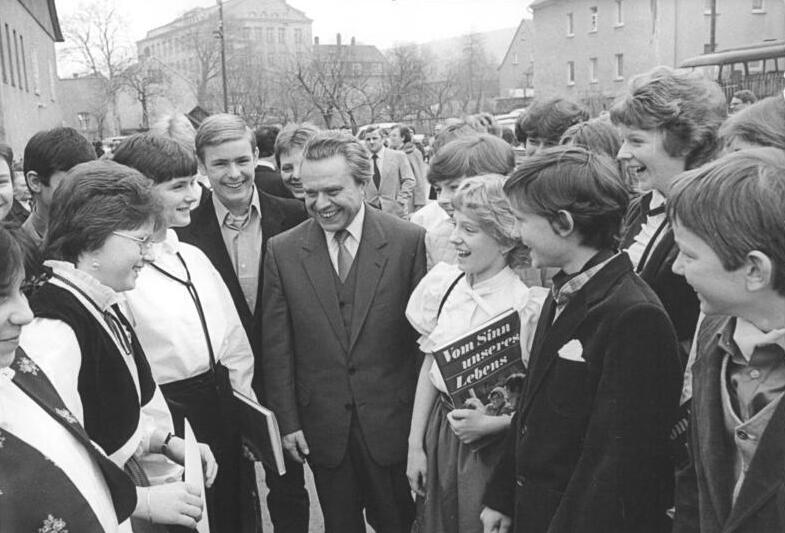
Lothar Kolditz with participants of the Jugendweihe in his home town of Zschorlau, 1984

In September 1971, he was appointed to the electoral commission of the German Democratic Republic in preparation for the 1971 East German general election. On 30 October 1981, Kolditz was elected President of the National Front of the German Democratic Republic, succeeding Erich Correns. In July 1982, Kolditz was elected as a member of the State Council of the GDR. From 1983 to 1990, he was a member of the presidium of the Society for German-Soviet Friendship (DSF). From 1986 to 1990, Kolditz was a member of the Presidential Council of the Cultural Association of the GDR. In the 1986 East German general election, Kolditz was elected to the Volkskammer as a representative of the Cultural Association of the GDR.

== Memberships, honors and Awards ==
- 1969: Corresponding member of the German Academy of Sciences
- 1972: National Prize of the German Democratic Republic, 3rd Class
- 1972: Full member of the Academy of Sciences of the German Democratic Republic
- 1976: Clemens Winkler Medal of the Chemical Society of the German Democratic Republic
- 1983: Honorary Doctorate from the Freiberg University of Mining and Technology
- 1984: Patriotic Order of Merit, in Gold
- 1988: Foreign Member of the USSR Academy of Sciences
- 1989: Outstanding Scientist of the People
- 1992: Foreign Member of the Russian Academy of Sciences
- 1993: Member of the Leibniz Society of Sciences in Berlin

== Publications ==
Textbooks and books

- Radiochemistry (Radiochemie). In: Gustav Hertz: Textbook of Nuclear Physics, Volume III, Applied Nuclear Physics (Lehrbuch der Kernphysik, Band III, Angewandte Kernphysik). 1962.
- Editor: Włodzimierz Trzebiatowski: Textbook of Inorganic Chemistry (Lehrbuch der anorganischen Chemie). 1963.
- Halides of Arsenic and Antimony. In: H. J. Emeleus: Advances in Inorganic Chemistry and Radiochemistry. Vol. 7. Academic Press, New York/London 1965.
- Halides of Arsenic and Antimony. In: Viktor Gutmann: Halogen Chemistry. Vol. 2. Academic Press New York/London 1967.
- Editor: Inorganic: Text and practical book of inorganic chemistry; with an introduction to physical chemistry (Anorganikum: Lehr- und Praktikumsbuch der anorganischen Chemie; mit einer Einführung in die physikalische Chemie). 1967.
- Compounds of Nb and Ta (Verbindungen von Niob und Tantal). In: Niedenzu, Lexington, Kentucky: Houben-Weyl, Methodicum Chimicum. Academic Press, New York/London 1974.
- with Günter Kauschka: Exchange Reactions (Austauschreaktionen). In: Recent Developments in Inorganic Chemistry (Neuere Entwicklungen der anorganischen Chemie). 1974.
- Editor and co-author: Inorganic Chemistry (Textbook) (Anorganische Chemie). 1978.
- with Jurij Alexandrovič Buslaev und Eleonora Alexandrovna Kravčenko: Nuclear quadrupole resonance in inorganic chemistry. 1987.
- Perfluorohalogenoorgano Compounds of Main Group Elements. In: Gmelin Handbook of Inorganic and Organometallic Chemistry. 8th Edition. Springer 1994.
- The Linden University 1945 to 1990 - reconstruction, consolidation and turbulence in chemistry, the Prorectorate for Natural Sciences (Die Lindenuniversität 1945 bis 1990 – Wiederaufbau, Konsolidierung und Turbulenzen in der Chemie, das Prorektorat für Naturwissenschaften). In: Wolfgang Girnus and Klaus Meier: Humboldt University under the Linden (Die Humboldt-Universität Unter den Linden 1945 bis 1990). Leipzig University Press 2010.
- Preparation of Fluorine-Containing Molecular Halides and Heteropolar Salts with Elements of Group 15 and Niobium and Tantalum Halides; Fluoro and Fluorohydroxy Complexes of As, Sb and Sn. In: Herbert W. Roesky: Efficient Preparations of Fluorine Compounds. John Wiley & Sons, Inc. 2013.
