= Erich Correns (chemist) =

German chemist

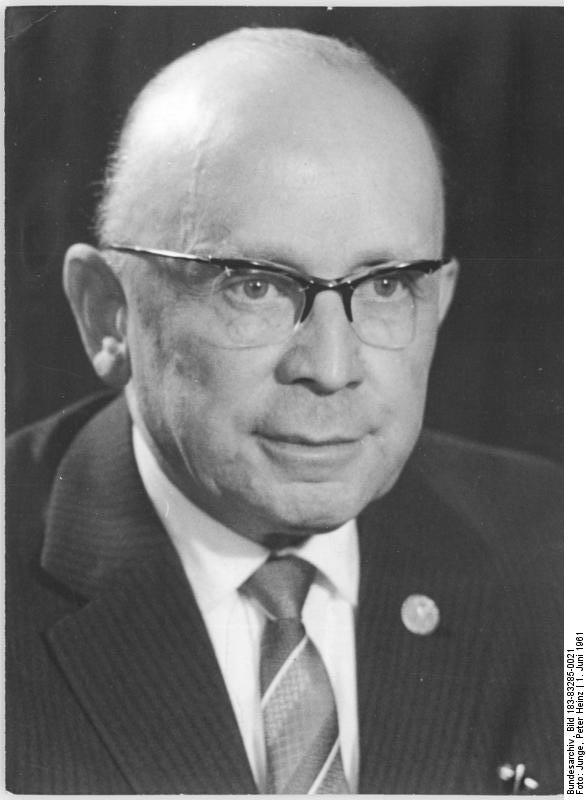
- Erich Correns in 1961

President of the National Front of the German Democratic Republic
- In office 1950–1981
- Preceded by: President of the Democratic Bloc of Parties and Mass Organisations
- Succeeded by: Lothar Kolditz

Personal details
- Born: 12 May 1896 Tübingen, German Empire
- Died: 18 May 1981 (aged 85) East Berlin, German Democratic Republic
- Resting place: Zentralfriedhof Friedrichsfelde, Berlin
- Parent: Carl Correns (father)
- Education: Friedrich Wilhelm University; University of Tübingen
- Occupation: Chemist
- Awards: Iron Cross 2nd Class; Order of Karl Marx (1971); Patriotic Order of Merit, Bar of Honor (1965); Patriotic Order of Merit, in Gold (1954)

Military service
- Branch/service: German Empire
- Battles/wars: First World War

Erich Paul Hubert Correns (12 May 1896 – 18 May 1981) was a German chemist and president of the National Front of the German Democratic Republic (East Germany).

== Life ==
Correns was born in 1896 in Tübingen. His father was biologist Carl Correns. After attending grammar school in Leipzig and Münster, he completed his military service. He took part in the First World War, where he met Richard Sorge. From 1918 to 1922 he studied chemistry, botany and physics at the universities in Berlin and Tübingen. He earned his doctorate and worked from 1922 to 1924 as an assistant at the Kaiser Wilhelm Institute for Chemistry in Berlin and at the Kaiser Wilhelm Institute for Leather Research in Dresden, headed by Max Bergmann.

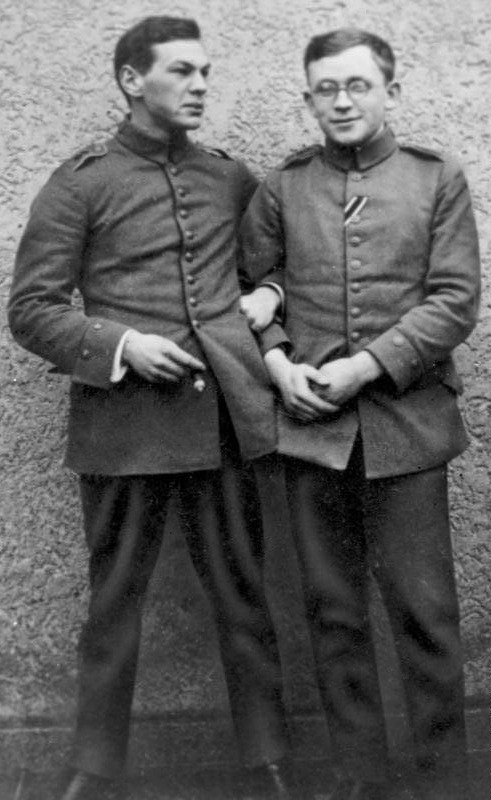
Correns (right) with Richard Sorge during World War I in 1915

In 1925 Correns took up a job as an industrial chemist at I.G. Farben in Elberfeld and in 1931 became head of the acetyl cellulose plant in Elberfeld. In 1933 he was appointed head of the copper and artificial silk factory in Dormagen. From 1937 he was in charge of the establishment of Zellwolle- und Kunstseide GmbH in Rudolstadt-Schwarza in Thuringia. Following measures by the authorities, he resigned as operations manager in 1939 and became a consulting chemist at Thüringische Zellwolle AG and the rayon-rayon ring. His Jewish wife was arrested on 24 May 1944, while on a business trip by Correns and died a day later in the Gestapo prison on Petersberg in Erfurt. The two children were not taken to the concentration camp. For this reason, and because of his distrust of the role that old Nazis still had in west Germany after the war, Correns, who was never a communist, took part in the construction of East Germany.

After the end of the war, Correns became director of the Rosenthal pulp and paper factory in Blankenstein in 1946. From 1948 he took over the management of the Thuringian artificial silk works in Schwarza. In 1951 Correns became director of the Institute for Fiber Research of the German Academy of Sciences in Teltow. From 1951 he was a full member of the academy. Correns headed the institute until 1962, and was succeeded by Hermann Klare, who would later be president of the academy for many years. From 1953 to 1959 he held a professorship for chemical technology in pulp production at the Technical University in Dresden. In 1956 Correns became Dr. jur. H. c. at the Humboldt University in Berlin. In 1961 he retired.

Correns was President of the National Council of the National Front from 1950 until his death in 1981. From 1954 he was a member of the Volkskammer. In the same year, he became a member of the central board of the Society for German-Soviet Friendship and the Presidential Council of the Kulturbund. From 1957 he was a member of the Research Council and from 1960 a member of the State Council of the GDR. He was a co-founder of the magazine Fiber Research and Textile Technology (later Acta Polymerica).

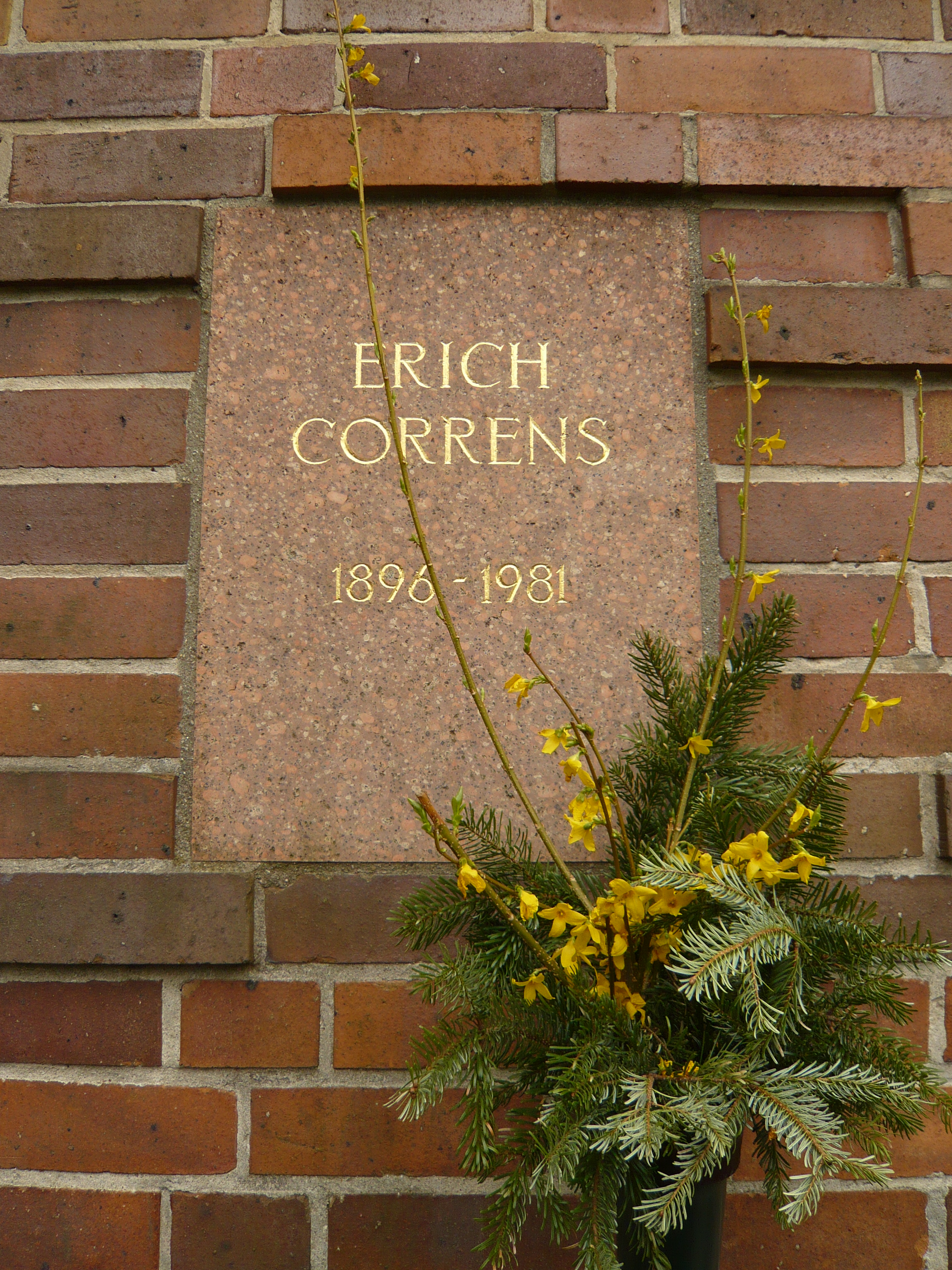
Grave

In 1954, Correns was one of the first 22 medal winners to receive the Patriotic Order of Merit in Gold, in 1965 the Bar of Honor for the Patriotic Order of Merit in Gold and in 1971 the Karl Marx Order. His urn was buried in the Socialist Memorial at the Friedrichsfelde Central Cemetery in Lichtenberg.
