= Rosenthal (Berlin) =

- Quarter of Berlin
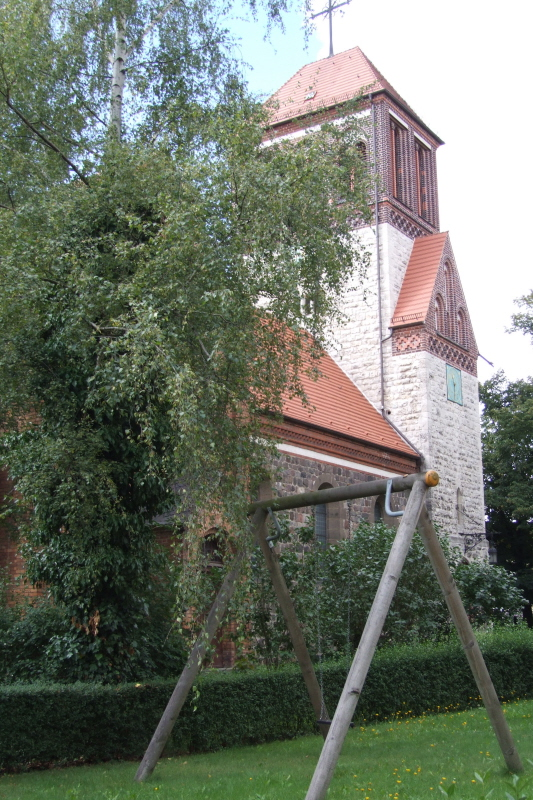
- Village church

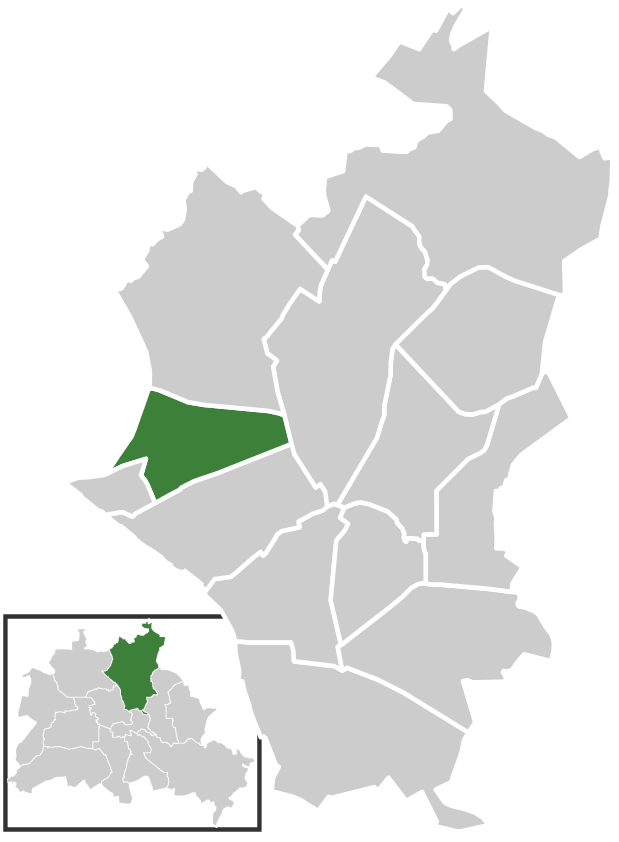
- Location of Rosenthal in Pankow borough and Berlin
- Interactive map of Rosenthal
- Location within Germany Location within Berlin
- Coordinates: 52°35′57″N 13°22′38″E
- Country: Germany
- State: Berlin
- City: Berlin
- Borough: Pankow
- Founded: 1305

Area
  - Total: 4.9 km^{2} (1.9 sq mi)
- Elevation: 90 m (300 ft)

Population (2024-12-31)
  - Total: 10,107
  - Density: 2,100/km^{2} (5,300/sq mi)
- Time zone: UTC+01:00 (CET)
  - Summer (DST): UTC+02:00 (CEST)
- Postal codes: 13158
- Vehicle registration: B

Rosenthal (German pronunciation: [ˈʁoːzn̩taːl]) is an affluent locality within the Berlin borough of Pankow. The old village first mentioned in a 1356 deed as Rosendalle became a part of Greater Berlin in 1920.

== Overview ==
The Rosenthal locality includes the Nordend (North End) neighborhood.

Every year the people of Rosenthal celebrate the Rosenthaler Herbst (Rosenthal Autumn), which is completely organised by the "Bürgerverein Dorf Rosenthal e. V.", a registered, non-commercial and non-profit citizens' organisation. Most of the meetings and conference are held at the old restaurant Dittmann's. It is the only traditional restaurant that is left in Rosenthal and lasted for over 120 years since 1892. It was founded by Wilhelm Dittmann.

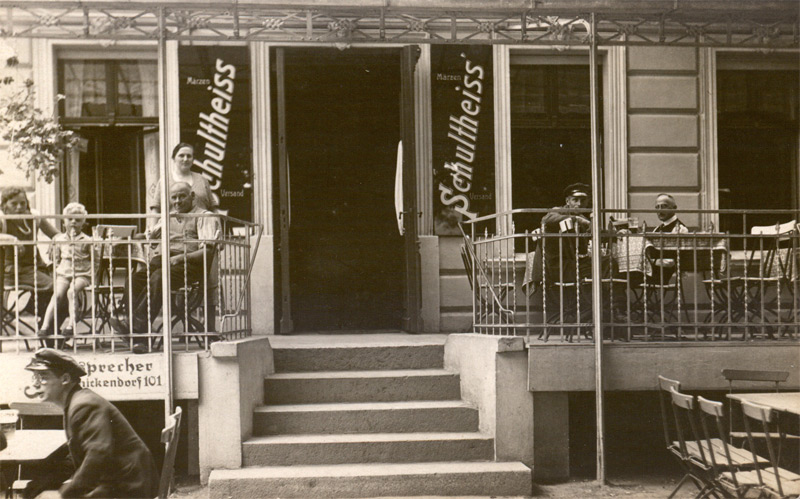
Entrance of the restaurant Dittmanns in the early 1920. Located at Berlin Pankow-Rosenthal in Germany.

From 1901–1903 Master mason Schreiber build a house that was supposed to be used as a school at the Hauptstraße 94;[5]. Since 1990 it is being used as a youth club called "Landhaus Berlin-Rosenthal". landhaus-rosenthal.de

== Transportation ==
Rosenthal is served by the M1 tramway line of the Berlin Straßenbahn. The federal highway Bundesstraße 96a from Berlin to Oranienburg runs through Nordend.

== Personalities ==
- Emmy Damerius-Koenen
- Otto Nagel
