= Democratic Women's League of Germany =

Mass women's organisation in East Germany

Democratic Women's Federation of Germany
- Demokratischer Frauenbund Deutschlands
- Flag

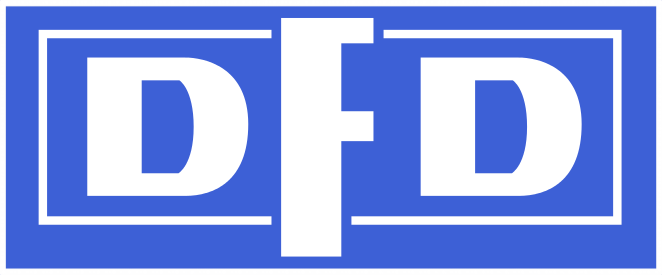
- Logo
- Formation: March 1947; 79 years ago
- Dissolved: 1990
- Type: Mass organization
- Purpose: Women's rights
- Members: 1.5 million (1988)
- Parent organization: National Front

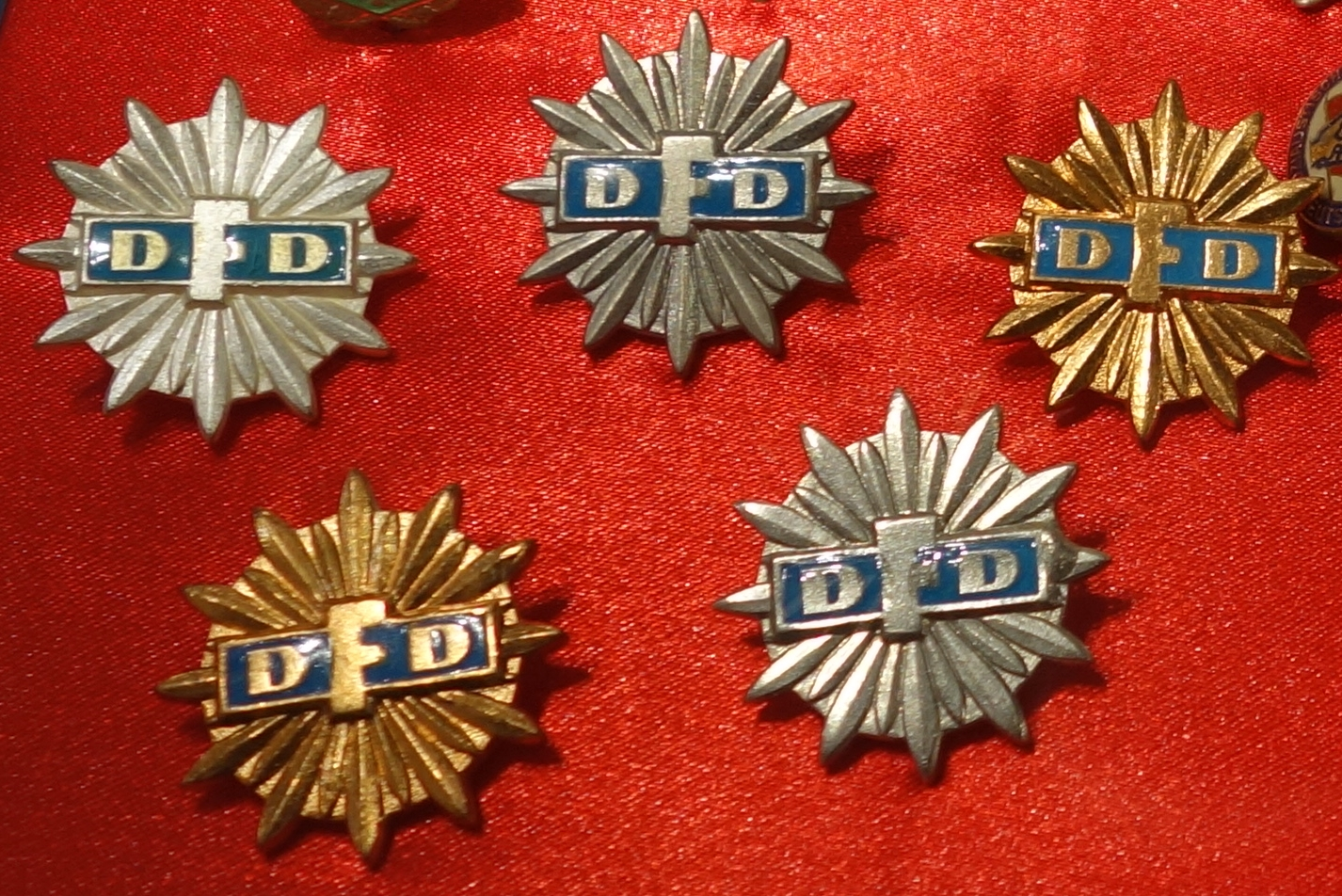
Badges of the Democratic Women's League of Germany

The Democratic Women's League of Germany (German: Demokratischer Frauenbund Deutschlands, or DFD) was the mass women's organisation in East Germany. It was one of the constituent members of the National Front and sent representatives to the Volkskammer. In 1988, membership was 1.5 million.

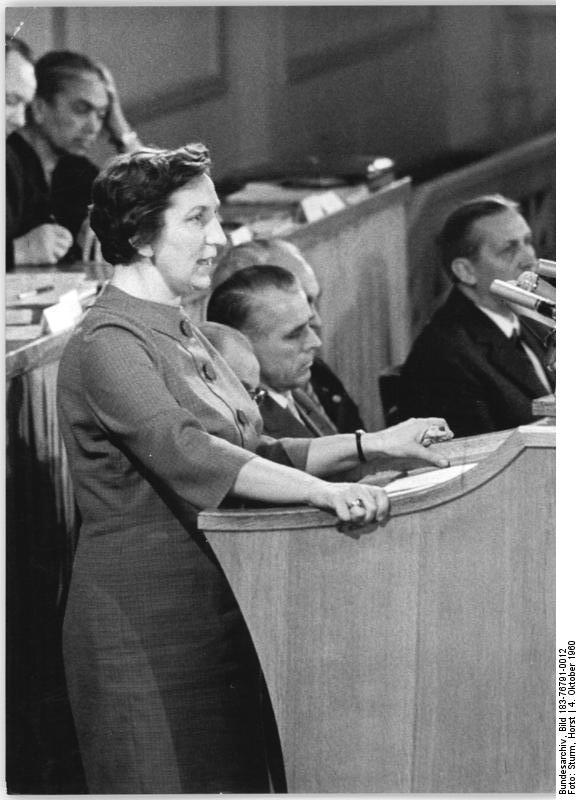
Ilse Thiele led the DFD for most of its existence (1953 to 1989).

The DFD did not have much independence from the ruling Socialist Unity Party (SED). Käte Selbmann, a member of the DFD's executive board, complained that it was "a pre-school for women, neither as central as the FDGB nor even more important than any other mass organization to women's work, and absolutely subordinate to the SED", while historian Valerie Dubslaff writes that "the role of the department was therefore neither to represent the interests of women nor to promote them within the party, but to execute the political will of its leaders".

== Organization ==
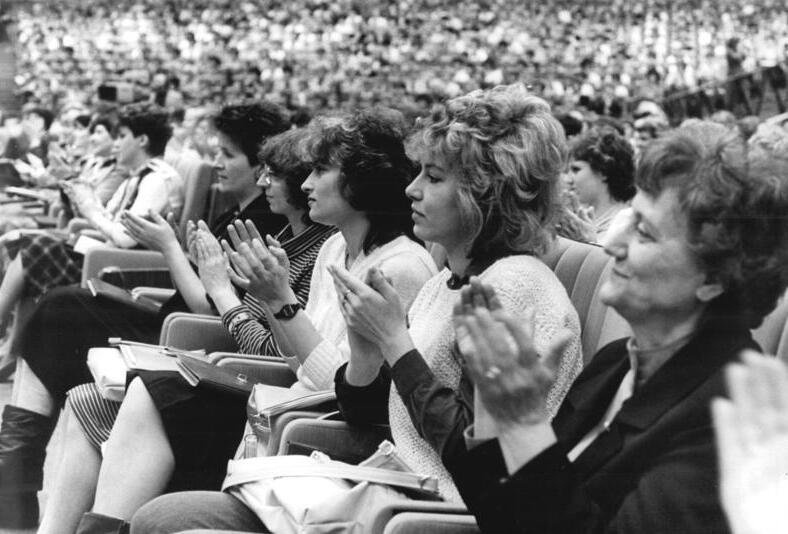
Representatives at the 12th DFD Congress in East Berlin, 1987

The DFD was established in March 1947 and had the following official aims:

- Removal of fascist ideas
- Education for women
- Equal rights
- Fair social living conditions
- Education of children in the spirit of humanism and peace
- Co-operation with the international women's movement

=== Chairwomen of the Democratic Women's Federation of Germany ===
| Name | Entered office | Left office |
|---|---|---|
| Anne-Marie Durand-Wever | 1947 | 1948 |
| Emmy Damerius-Koenen | 1948 | 1949 |
| Elli Schmidt | 1949 | September 1953 |
| Ilse Thiele | September 1953 | November 1989 |
| Eva Rohmann | 1989 | 1990 |
| Gisela Steineckert | 1990 | 1990 |
