= German Economic Commission =

Top administrative body in the Soviet Occupation Zone of Germany

The German Economic Commission (German: Deutsche Wirtschaftskommission; DWK) was the top administrative body in the Soviet Occupation Zone of Germany prior to the creation of the German Democratic Republic (German: Deutsche Demokratische Republik).

== History ==
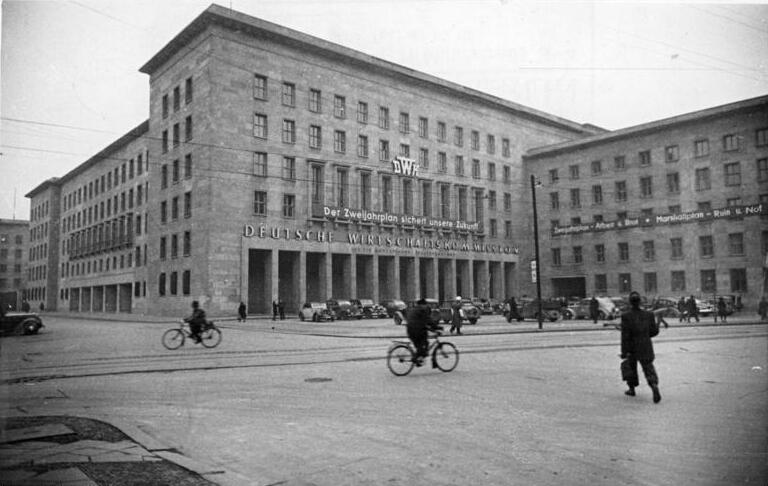
The former Air Ministry building in Berlin, then named 'House of the DWK', was the seat of the German Economic Commission (DWK). The title above the pillars is Deutsche Wirtschaftskommission. Above this the DWK logo and a banner with the title 'The Two-Year Plan secures our future' can be seen. The banner on the right reads "Two-Year Plan = Work and Bread * Marshall Plan = Ruin and Despair". Date of photo: 8 January 1949.

The DWK was established in June 1947 by the Soviet Military Administration in Germany (German: Sowjetische Militäradministration in Deutschland or SMAD) as a central German auxiliary institution of the SMAD. It had the assigned task of assisting the SMAD in the execution of economic affairs. The DWK was housed in the former Reich Air Ministry building in East Berlin, at Leipziger Strasse 7. Initially the SMAD resisted giving the DWK power independent of itself, but this changed after the creation of the merger of the United States' and the United Kingdom's occupation zones into the Bizone in January 1947. A SMAD order from Marshal Vasily Sokolovsky on 12 February 1948 granted the DWK legislative power to issue orders and directives to all German organs within the Soviet zone and converted it into a nascent state structure for all intents and purposes, with competence far beyond the economy proper, thus it became the predecessor of the eventual East German government. Heinrich Rau became chairman of the converted body and after a reorganisation, announced the new organisational structure on 9 March 1948. In November 1948, the Soviet Central Committee issued another decree authorizing an increase in size of the DWK. This allowed the Socialist Unity Party of Germany under Wilhelm Pieck and Walter Ulbricht to consolidate its control over the DWK, although many former members of the Wehrmacht and the Nazi Party continued to hold posts in it.

The DWK ceased to exist on 11 or 12 October 1949 some days after the proclamation of the German Democratic Republic.

== See also ==
- Heinrich Rau
- Merger of the KPD and SPD into the Socialist Unity Party of Germany
- German People's Congress
- German People's Council
- People's Control Commission
