= Soviet Control Commission in East Germany =

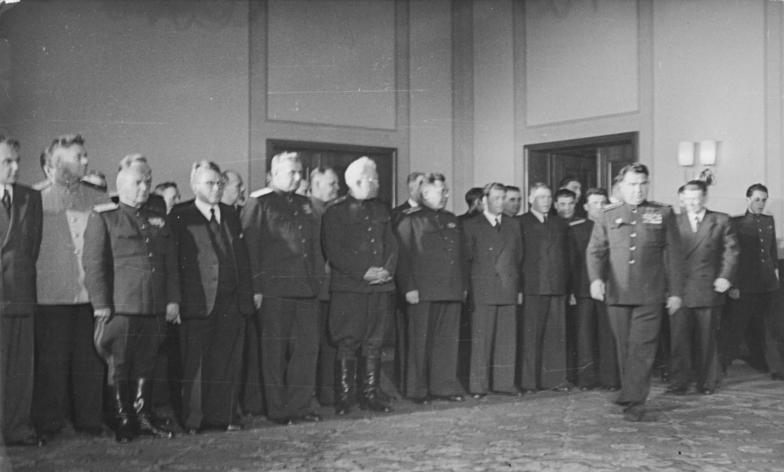
Members of the People's Control Commission, 11 November 1949

The Soviet Control Commission (German: Sowjetische Kontrollkommission, SKK) was a monitoring and management committee established by the Soviet Union in order to oversee the leadership of the German Democratic Republic. It was active from 10 October 1949 and 20 September 1955 and it was legitimated by the Potsdam Agreement between the Allies.

== History ==
In 1949, the Soviet Military Administration in Germany (SMAD), which had been previously the main authority in the Soviet occupation zone, transferred its powers to the German administrative institutions in sight of the foundation of a self-governing communist-led state in East Germany. When the German Democratic Republic was proclaimed in October 1949, the SMAD was dismantled and reorganized as the Soviet Control Commission, giving more independence to the GDR government.

As Supreme Commander of the Group of Soviet Forces in Germany and SMAD leader, General Vasily Chuikov oversaw the establishment of the SKK and he became head of it shortly thereafter.

After the death of Joseph Stalin, the Commission became known as the "High Commission of the USSR in Germany". The former political adviser to General Chuikov, Vladimir Semyonov, was appointed as the High Commissioner. The apparatus of the High Commissioner had a decisive role in suppressing the anti-government protests which began in East Berlin and covered the entire territory of the German Democratic Republic in June 1953 (see East German uprising of 1953).

The USSR abolished the commission on 20 September 1955 after the recognizing of the "full sovereignty" of the GDR. However, the Soviet government had continued to exercise its political influence through its embassy in East Berlin and the presence of Red Army troops in the East German territory.

== Functions ==
If the decisions made by the GDR government were considered against Soviet directives or Marxist–Leninist principles, the SKK was authorized to overrule each decision. Local officials had little revision power on the decisions. The Soviet Control Commission had controlled both the federal government of the GDR and each local state government, and it had been considered as the ultimate authority in both the Soviet zone and in the former East Germany.

The SKK monitored the implementation of the Potsdam agreements and of the other Allied decisions in the GDR. Members of the Soviet Control commission had to represent the interests of the Soviet Union in the GDR, but at the same time they also supported the leading Socialist Unity Party of Germany in its actions against internal and external political opponents.

== See also ==
- Merger of the KPD and SPD into the Socialist Unity Party of Germany
- German People's Congress
- German People's Council
- German Economic Commission
