= Forced merger of the Communist Party of Germany and Social Democratic Party of Germany =

Party merger in Soviet-occupied Germany

Forced Merger of the KPD and SPD
Forced Merger of the Communist Party of Germany and Social Democratic Party of Germany into the Socialist Unity Party of Germany
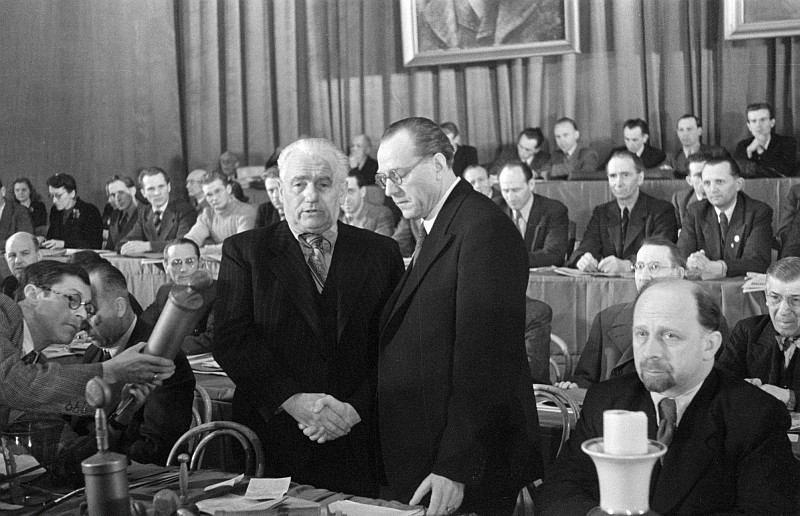
- Pieck and Grotewohl shake hands during the unification ceremony. Walter Ulbricht in the foreground to the right of Grotewohl
- Type: Unification treaty
- Context: Merger of the KPD and SPD into the Socialist Unity Party of Germany
- Signed: 21 April 1946; 80 years ago
- Location: Admiralspalast, Berlin, Soviet occupation zone
- Signatories: Wilhelm Pieck (Chairman of the KPD); Otto Grotewohl (Chairman of the SPD)
- Parties: Communist Party of Germany (KPD); Social Democratic Party of Germany (SPD)
- Languages: German

The east German branches of the Communist Party of Germany (KPD) and the Social Democratic Party of Germany (SPD) merged to form the Socialist Unity Party of Germany (SED) on 21 April 1946 under heavy pressure from the Soviet occupation forces. Although nominally a merger of equals, the merged party quickly fell under Communist domination and developed along lines similar to other Communist Parties in what became the Eastern Bloc. The SED would be the ruling party of the German Democratic Republic until the end of the republic in December 1989.

Though a sizeable faction of the SPD in the Soviet occupation zone supported the merger, many did not and in the process of the merger, 5,000 Social Democrats who opposed the merger were put in labor camps and prisons and many more were subjected to physical or psychological pressure by the Soviet Military Administration, leading to the unification to now be commonly referred to as a forced merger (German: Zwangsvereinigung) by historians and the public at large.

== Background ==
Among circles of the workers' parties KPD and SPD there were different interpretations of the reasons for the rise of the Nazis and their electoral success. A portion of the Social Democrats blamed the Communists for the devastation of the final phase of the Weimar Republic. The Communist Party, in turn, insulted the Social Democrats as "social fascists". The KPD abandoned its ultra-left political line at its 1935 Brussels Party Conference, appealing for a united front with the Social Democrats and a broad anti-fascist popular front including bourgeois forces.

In 1945 there were calls in both the SPD and KPD for a united workers' party. The Soviet Military Administration in Germany initially opposed the idea because they took it for granted that the Communist Party would, under their guidance, develop into the strongest political force in the Soviet occupation zone. However, the outcomes of the elections conducted in Hungary and Austria in November 1945, and especially the poor performance of the Communist parties, demonstrated the urgent need for a change of strategy by the Communist party. Both Stalin and Walter Ulbricht recognized the "Austria hazard" („Gefahr Österreich“) and launched in November 1945, a campaign for unification of the two parties in order to secure the leading role of the Communist party.

== Preparation for the merger ==
Under heavy pressure from the Soviet occupation forces and the Communist Party leadership, and with the support of some leading Social Democrats, working groups and committees were formed at all levels of the parties, whose declared aim was to create a union between the two parties. Many Social Democrats unwilling to unite were arrested in early 1946 in all areas of the Soviet occupation zone. A second conference of KPD and SPD representatives held on 26 February 1946 articulated the path towards party unification.

On 1 March 1946, a chaotic conference of SPD party officials, convened on the initiative of the Communist and SPD leaderships, was held in the Admiralspalast, Berlin. The meeting voted to arrange a vote of SPD party members, both in the Soviet occupation zone and across Berlin, on the proposed merger with the Communist Party. On 14 March 1946 the Central Committee of the SPD published a call for a merger of the SPD and KPD. A ballot was scheduled to take place of SPD members in Berlin on 31 March 1946. In the Soviet sector (subsequently known as East Berlin) Soviet soldiers sealed the ballot boxes less than thirty minutes after the polls had opened, and dispersed the queues of those waiting to vote. In West Berlin more than 70% of the SPD members took part in the vote. In the western sector, invited to vote on an immediate merger ("sofortige Verschmelzung") with the Communists, 82% of those voting rejected the proposal. However, on a second proposal for a "working alliance" ("Aktionsbündnis") with the Communists, 62% of those voting did so in support of the motion.

== Party unification day ==
During March 1946 local and district-level joint KPD-SPD party assemblies were held across Germany. On 7 April 1946 state-level SED party organizations were formed.

In opposition to the unification process, on 7 April 1946 the SPD anti-merger tendency in western sector of Berlin held a party conference in a school in Zehlendorf (Berlin) at which they elected a three-man leadership team comprising Karl Germer Jr., Franz Neumann and Curt Swolinzky.

The handshake at the centre of the SED party flag was introduced to symbolize the hand shake of the two party chairmen, Wilhelm Pieck (KPD) and Otto Grotewohl (SPD) at the unification congress of the SED.

On 19-20 April 1946 the 15th KPD party congress and the 40th SPD party congress both voted in favour of formalizing the merger into SED. On 21-22 April 1946 another meeting took place in the Soviet-occupied sector of Berlin at the Admiralspalast. This was the Unification congress, and it was attended by delegates from the SPD and KPD. On 22 April 1946 the unification of the KPD and the (East German) SPD into the SED was completed. There were over 1,000 party members in attendance of whom 47% came from the KPD and 53% from the SPD. 230 of the delegates came from the western occupation zones. The 103 social democratic delegates from the western occupation zones participated in the unification congress in breach of the SPD party discipline. The unification congress elected Party Board (Parteivorstand) with 42 communists (out of whom 12 were from the Western occupation zones) and 38 Social Democrats (out of whom 8 were from the Western occupation zones). The SED Party Board held its first meeting on 23 April 1946 and elected a 14-member Central Secretariat consisting of Otto Grotewohl, Max Fechner, Erich Gniffke, Helmut Lehmann, Otto Meier, August Karsten and Katharina Kern (from SPD), Wilhelm Pieck, Walter Ulbricht, Franz Dalhem, Paul Merker, Anton Ackermann, Hermann Matern and Elli Schmidt (from KPD).

The new party would apply equal representation by two representatives between KPD and SPD at every level. The party Chairmen were Wilhelm Pieck (KPD) and Otto Grotewohl (SPD), their deputies Walter Ulbricht (KPD) and Max Fechner (SPD). The handshake of the two party chairmen was embodied in the central element of the new party's logo. Following this special congress individual members of the KPD and SPD would be able to transfer their membership to the new SED with a simple signature.

Although parity of power and position between members of the two former parties continued to be applied extensively for a couple of years, by 1949 SPD people were virtually excluded. Between 1948 and 1951 "equal representation" was abandoned, as former SPD members were forced out of their jobs, denounced as "Agents of Schumacher", subjected to defamation, regular purges and at times imprisonment, so that they were frightened into silence. Influential party positions in the new ruling party were being given almost exclusively to former members of the KPD.

== Berlin, the special case ==
The four occupation zones in Berlin as established in 1945

The rules agreed between the occupying powers concerning Berlin itself conferred on the city a special status which differentiated the Soviet sector of Berlin from the Soviet occupation zone of Germany which on three of its four sides adjoined it. The SPD used this fact to run a party referendum on the merger, using a secret ballot, across the whole of Berlin. The referendum was suppressed in the Soviet sector on 31 March 1946, but it went ahead in those parts of the city controlled by the other three occupying powers, and resulted in rejection of the merger proposal from 82% of the votes cast by participating SPD members. The merger of the KPD and SPD to form the SED only affected the Soviet sector of the city. It was not till the end of May 1946 that the four Allies reached agreement: the western allies permitted the SED in the western sectors, and in return the Soviet Military Administration in Germany agreed to allow the SPD back into the eastern sector of Berlin. That did not mean, however, that the SPD was able to operate unhindered as a political party in East Berlin. Following the City council elections for Greater Berlin which took place on 20 October 1946, in which the SED and SPD both competed, the total turnout was high at 92.3%. Across the city, the SPD won 48.7% of the vote while the SED won 19.8%. Of the other principal participants the CDU (party) won 22.2% and the LDP 9.3%.

As matters turned out, this was the only free election to take place across the entirety of Berlin until after 1990. Following the 1946 city council election the Soviet Military Administration and the SED in effect divided the city. In 1947 the Soviet city commander vetoed from the election of Ernst Reuter as the city's governing mayor. This was followed up by the blowing up of the City Council Building by "the masses" and the withdrawal of the Soviet city commander from the Allied Kommandatura in 1948, which turned out to be a prelude to the Soviet Union's Blockade of West Berlin.

The SPD did indeed continue to exist in the eastern sector, but the basis for its existence changed fundamentally, since it was banned from public activity and its participation in elections was blocked by the National Front of the Democratic Republic of Germany, a political alliance created to enable minor political parties to be controlled by the SED. Some individual SPD members nevertheless continued to be politically active. Most notably, Kurt Neubauer, the regional SPD chairman in Berlin-Friedrichshain was elected to the West German Bundestag where he sat from 1 February 1952 till 16 April 1963, for much of the time as the only member of the chamber with a home address inside the Soviet occupation zone. It was only in August 1961, a few days after the Berlin Wall was erected, that the party closed his office in East Berlin, but without giving up its claim to it.

== The example of Thuringia ==
In contrast to Berlin, for which voting results show SPD majorities rejecting the merger of the left-wing parties, the historian Steffen Kachel has identified quite a different set of results in Thuringia, a region dominated by farms and forests, where for most of the time left-wing parties had hitherto enjoyed a lower level of overall support among the population as a whole than, typically, applied in western Europe's big industrial cities. In Berlin and nationally the SPD had already experienced lengthy periods in government during the Weimar years. Especially in Berlin city politics, the KPD had conducted an active and largely constructive role in opposition before 1933. Rivalry between SPD and KPD in Berlin was deeply rooted. In Thuringia the relationship between the two parties had been far more collaborative. There had even in 1923, and briefly, been a period of coalition between them in the regional government during the economic crisis of that time. After 1933 the collaborative relationship between the SPD and the KPD in rural Thuringia had been sustained during the twelve Nazi years (when both parties had been banned by the government) and surfaced again in 1945 until broken by the Stalinist approach presented by the creation of the SED.

== Party memberships at the time of the merger ==
In the Soviet occupation zone (excluding Greater Berlin) party membership numbers were as follows:

- KPD: .....624,000 members (April 1946)
- SPD: .....695,000 members (31 March 1946)
- SED: ..1,297,600 members (April 1946)

The fact that the post-merger membership total of the merged of the SED was more than 20,000 below the combined pre-merger total memberships of the two predecessor parties reflects the fact that several thousand SPD members did not instantly rush to sign their party transfer forms.

Among ex-SPD members, rejection of the merger was at its strongest in Greater Berlin, and it was here that the largest proportion of party members did not become members of the new merged party:

- KPD, Berlin: 75,000 members (April 1946)
- SPD, Berlin: 50,000 members (31 March 1946)
- SED, Berlin: 99,000 members (April 1946)

During the two years following the party merger, overall membership of the SED increased significantly, from 1,297,600 to approximately 2,000,000 across East Germany by the summer of 1948, possibly swollen by prisoners of war returning from the Soviet Union or former SPD members who had initially rejected the merger having had a change of heart, whether voluntarily or due to official pressure.

== Resurgence of KPD in the Trizone ==
In the Western occupation zone (or Trizone), the party was blocked from using the name 'SED' and failed to impose the forced merger onto the local SPD branches. In April 1948 a party conference for the Trizone was held, which created a common KPD party organization for the three Western occupation zones with Max Reimann as its chairman. In the autumn of 1948 this West German KPD broke their links with the SED. However this split did not include the West Berlin sections of SED. In 1962 the West Berlin section of the SED was separated from the party. It would have a minor role in West Berlin politics, later changing its name to the Socialist Unity Party of West Berlin (SEW) in 1969.

== Consequences and follow-through ==
SPD members who had opposed the merger were prevented from refounding an independent Social Democratic party in the Soviet occupation zone by the Soviet administration. Six months after the KPD/SPD merger, in the regional elections of October 1946 the new unified workers' party did not attract as many votes as they had anticipated: despite massive support from the occupation authorities, the SED failed to gain an overall majority in any of the regional legislatures. In Mecklenburg and Thuringia their vote fell only slightly short of the required 50%, but in Saxony-Anhalt and Brandenburg, the "Bourgeois" CDU and LDP gained sufficient electoral support to form governing coalitions. Even more disappointing for the new SED (party) was the electoral outcome in Greater Berlin, where the SED won only 19.8% of the vote, notwithstanding the best efforts of the authorities.

As a result, subsequent elections in East Germany applied the "single list" approach. Voters were presented with a single list from the National Front of Democratic Germany, which in turn was controlled by the SED. Only one candidate appeared on the ballot. Voters simply took the ballot paper and dropped it into the ballot box. Those who wanted to vote against the candidate had to go to a separate voting booth, without any secrecy. Seats were apportioned based on a set quota, not according to actual vote totals. By ensuring that its candidates dominated the list, the SED effectively predetermined the composition of the National legislature (Volkskammer). The upside of East Germany's new voting system, in 1950, was apparent from the reported 99.6% level of support for the SED based on a turnout of 98.5%.

After 1946 SPD members who had spoken up in opposition to the party merger were required to surrender their offices. Many faced political persecution and some fled. Some persisted in their political beliefs with the Eastern Bureau of the SPD which continued the political work of the party leaders and members who had fled the country. The Eastern Bureau was allowed to participate in the 1950 Volkskammer election and won 6 seats; however, the office was banned from participating from 1954 and onwards because of accusations of "espionage" and "diversion" by DDR and SED authorities and was eventually closed in 1981.

It was not until October 1989 that a Social Democratic Party was again established in the German Democratic Republic. The SPD then participated in the country's first (and as matters turned out last) free election in March 1990, winning 21.9% of the overall vote. Later in the year, in October 1990, East Germany's SPD merged with the West German SPD, in a development which mirrored the reunification of Germany itself.

== See also ==
- Soviet Military Administration in Germany
- German Economic Commission
- German People's Congress
- German People's Council
- People's Control Commission
- Foundation of East Germany
- People's Chamber
