= German People's Council =

The German People's Council (German: Deutscher Volksrat) was a consultative body in the Soviet Occupation Zone of Germany that operated in 1948–1949. The main task of the People's Council was to draw up a constitution on the basis of a draft presented by the SED in 1946.

== First people's council ==
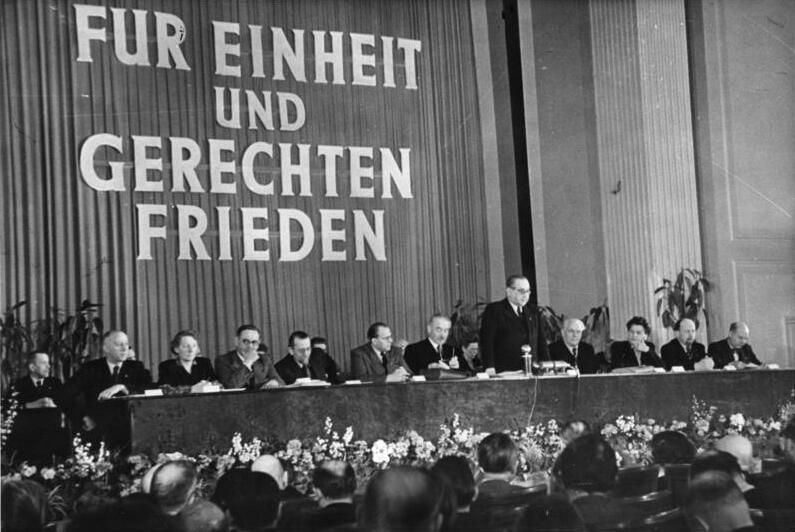
Meeting of the first People's Council, March 1949

The First German People's Council emerged from the Second German People's Congress convened on 17–18 March 1948. It consisted of 300 voting members of the Soviet Occupation Zone. At the inaugural meeting of a further 100 people had been invited from the Western zones in order to underscore the overall German claim. The organization of the People's Council was similar to that of a parliament (though it lacked the legitimacy of an election) and elected a Presidium and committees. The inclusion of non-communist parties put emphasis on the finding that the prior People's Council should be a parliament, the SED attempted to portray it as a pan-German Parliament. The selection of members of the People's Council had ensured that the SED would have a large majority. In the executive committee and all committees, the SED had absolute majorities.

=== Constitutional committee ===
In the People's Council, a constitutional committee was formed that would develop under the leadership of Otto Grotewohl. The committee was based on a draft of the SED already developed in November 1946. The draft was drawn up by the committee on 22 October 1948 approved by the People's Council and on 19 March 1949 formally adopted. The proposal was then referred to the Third German People's Congress for approval.

== Second people's council ==
The Second German People's Council was selected from the Third German People's Congress, at 29–30. Convened in May 1949. It appeared on 7 October 1949 together, during the Declaration of the German Democratic Republic, and constituted itself as a provisional parliament of the GDR. The People's Council commissioned the former Social Democrat Otto Grotewohl with forming a government. Thus the founding of the GDR had been completed.

== See also ==
- Merger of the KPD and SPD into the Socialist Unity Party of Germany
- German Economic Commission
- German People's Congress
- Soviet Control Commission in East Germany
