= National Front of the German Democratic Republic =

East German alliance of political parties and mass organizations

National Front of the German Democratic Republic Nationale Front der Deutschen Demokratischen Republik
- Leader: Erich Correns (1950–1981); Lothar Kolditz (1981–1990)
- Founded: 30 March 1950
- Dissolved: 20 February 1990
- Headquarters: Thälmannplatz 8-9, East Berlin, East Germany
- Ideology: Communism; Marxism–Leninism
- Political position: Far-left

The National Front of the German Democratic Republic (German: Nationale Front der Deutschen Demokratischen Republik) was a coalition of parties and mass organisations from 1950 to 1990 which governed the German Democratic Republic (GDR), informally known as East Germany. Although it was presented as a broad alliance, real political authority in the country rested with the ruling Socialist Unity Party of Germany (SED). The National Front's primary role was to manage electoral processes through a single list of approved candidates (Einheitsliste) for the Volkskammer.

The National Front formalized the Democratic Bloc-arrangement, established in 1945, into a legal organization with, at last count, 1,409 employees and a leadership apparatus. After the Second World War, the Soviet Union permitted the formation of four parties, but in 1946 the Communist Party forced a merger with the Social Democrats to create the SED. Other parties such as the Christian Democratic Union (CDU) and the Liberal Democratic Party (LDPD) were gradually brought into line through intimidation and the removal of dissenting leaders. Two additional parties, the Democratic Farmers' Party (DBD) and the National Democratic Party (NDPD), were created in 1948 under SED direction to draw support away from existing parties and incorporate former Nazis. These non-SED parties were called Blockpartei.

Mass organisations such as trade unions and women's groups were also part of the National Front and held seats in the Volkskammer. Many of their representatives were SED members, ensuring continued control. All parties and organisations were required to accept the SED's leading role as a vanguard party, and even regional leaders were subject to SED approval. Although the blockpartei were granted significant resources and governmental representation, all ministers operated under the authority of the SED's Central Committee.

In the final months before the fall of the Berlin Wall in November 1989, some blockpartei members began to express limited dissent. The National Front was dissolved in February 1990, ahead of the first free elections in East Germany. After reunification, the blockpartei merged with their West German counterparts: the Liberal Democrats and National Democrats joined the Free Democratic Party (FDP), while the East German CDU and the DBD merged with the West German CDU. These mergers were controversial due to the blockpartei access to well-developed infrastructure and resources under the SED regime, putting them at a great competitive advantage over newly established parties.

== Constituent parties ==
Party	Ideology	Emblem	Flag	Foundation	Dissolution	Seats in the Volkskammer (1986)
Socialist Unity Party (SED)	Communism			21 April 1946	16 December 1989	127
Christian Democratic Union (CDU)	Christian socialism			26 June 1945	1/2 October 1990	52
Liberal Democratic Party (LDPD)	Liberal socialism			5 July 1945	27 March 1990	52
Democratic Farmers' Party (DBD)	Agrarian socialism			17 June 1948	15 September 1990	52
National Democratic Party (NDPD)	German nationalism			5 May 1948	27 March 1990	52

== Constituent mass organizations represented in the People's Chamber ==
The volunteering campaign "Nice towns and communities. Take part!"

Organization	Emblem	Flag	Foundation	Dissolution	Assigned representatives in the Volkskammer (1986)
Free German Trade Union Federation (FDGB)			1946	1990	61
Free German Youth (FDJ)			1946	exists today	37
Democratic Women's League of Germany (DFD)			1947	1990	32
Cultural Association of the GDR (KB)			1945	1990	21
Peasants Mutual Aid Association (VdgB)			1945	1994	14

== Other organizations associated with the National Front ==
The following organizations, which were part of the NF, did not send elected representatives to the Volkskammer but were active in the performance of its activities.

Organization	Emblem	Flag	Foundation	Dissolution
Society for German–Soviet Friendship			1949	1992
People's Solidarity			1945	exists today
Sport and Technology Association			1952	1990
German Gymnastics and Sports Federation			1957	1990
Ernst Thälmann Pioneer Organisation			1948	1990
Writers' Association of the GDR			1945	1990
Association of Gardeners, Settlers, and Animal Breeders			1952	1990
Association of Theatre Professionals			1966	1990
Union of Journalists			1945	1990
Chamber of Engineering			1946	1990
Peace Council of the GDR			1949	1990
Union of Persecutees of the Nazi Regime			1947	banned in East Germany in 1953, exists today
Association of German Consumer Cooperatives			1949	exists today (Zentralkonsum eG)
German Red Cross of the GDR			1952	1991
Committee of Antifascist Resistance Fighters			1953	1991
Solidarity Committee of the GDR			1960	1990
League of Lusatian Sorbs			1912 founded before the creation of the GDR	exists today

== History ==
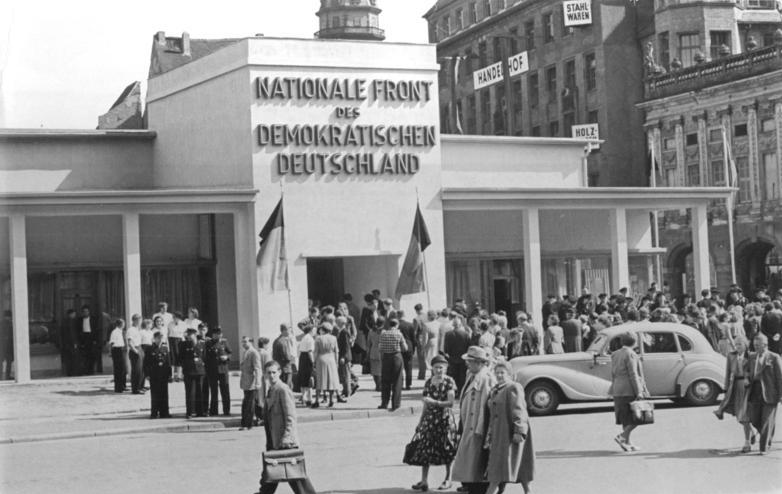
Pavilion of the National Front in Leipzig, 1953

The Nationale Front election poster from 1950

The National Front was the successor to the Demokratischer Block which had been founded in the Soviet occupation zone. The Front itself was founded on 30 March 1950. It operated through the issuing of a generally consistent proportion of seats (divided between the Front's parties and SED-controlled mass organisations) submitted in the form of a single list of candidates during each election to the People's Chamber. Seats were awarded on the basis of a set quota rather than vote totals. As voters only had the option of approving or rejecting the list in far-from-secret conditions, it "won" with virtually unanimous levels of support.

Although nominally a broad-based coalition of parties, in practice the SED was the only one with any real power. By ensuring that Communists dominated the lists, the SED essentially predetermined the composition of the People's Chamber.

In 1950-1951, the public rejection of the validity of the list by some German politicians resulted in some of them being imprisoned for "rejecting the electoral law of the German Democratic Republic" (as in the case of LDPD leader Günter Stempel). Although the SED had already become a full-fledged Stalinist "party of the new type" by the formation of the GDR, the other parties did not completely bend to the SED's will for a time. By the mid-1950s, however, the more courageous members of the constituent parties had been pushed out, and the parties had all been transformed into loyal partners of the SED. By this time, the SED itself had purged its few independent-minded members as well. The Front now took on a character similar to other groupings in the Eastern Bloc. For the next three decades, the minor parties in the Front had to accept the SED's "leading role" as a condition of their continued existence.

On 1 December 1989, the Front was effectively rendered impotent when the Volkskammer deleted the provision of the Constitution of East Germany that gave the SED a monopoly of power. Four days later, the Christian Democratic Union and Liberal Democratic Party, having thrown out their pro-Communist leaderships, withdrew from the Front. On 16 December the SED, having transformed itself into a democratic socialist party, reformed itself into the Party of Democratic Socialism. On 20 February 1990, an amendment to the constitution removed mention of the Front.

== Chairmen of the National Front ==
The National Front, as in institution, was led by a National Council that included representatives from all of its constituent organisations, with the SED being over-represented. The National Council elected a Presidium, whose chairman always was an independent politician. Despite the NF's power on paper, the chairman had almost no influence.

- Prof. Erich Correns (1950–1981)
- Prof. Lothar Kolditz (1981–1989)

== Electoral history ==
=== Volkskammer elections ===
Election	Votes	%	Seats	+/–	Position	Government
1950	12,088,745	99.6%	466 / 466	▲136	1^{st}	Sole legal coalition
1954	11,828,877	99.46%	466 / 466	Steady	1^{st}	Sole legal coalition
1958	11,689,110	99.87%	466 / 466	Steady	1^{st}	Sole legal coalition
1963	11,533,859	99.25%	434 / 434	▼32	1^{st}	Sole legal coalition
1967	11,197,265	99.93%	434 / 434	Steady	1^{st}	Sole legal coalition
1971	11,207,388	99.5%	434 / 434	Steady	1^{st}	Sole legal coalition
1976	11,245,023	98.58%	434 / 434	Steady	1^{st}	Sole legal coalition
1981	12,235,515	99.9%	500 / 500	▲66	1^{st}	Sole legal coalition
1986	12,392,094	99.94%	500 / 500	Steady	1^{st}	Sole legal coalition

== See also ==
- Politics of East Germany
- List of Volkskammer members (9th election period)
- Vietnamese Fatherland Front
- Democratic Front for the Reunification of the Fatherland
- Polish Committee of National Liberation/Front of National Unity
- National Front
- Fatherland Front
- People's Democratic Front/Front of Socialist Unity and Democracy
- Lao Front for National Construction
- National United Front of Kampuchea
