= Foundation of East Germany =

The Founding of East Germany (German: Gründung der Deutschen Demokratischen Republik), formally known as the German Democratic Republic, took place on October 7, 1949, and the following days a number of related events took place among them the Provisional People's Chamber, the Chamber of States, and the Provisional Government of East Germany were formed and Wilhelm Pieck was elected as the first president. During the existence of the German Democratic Republic, the event of the foundation was annually commemorated in the Republic Day which was a public holiday.

== Background ==
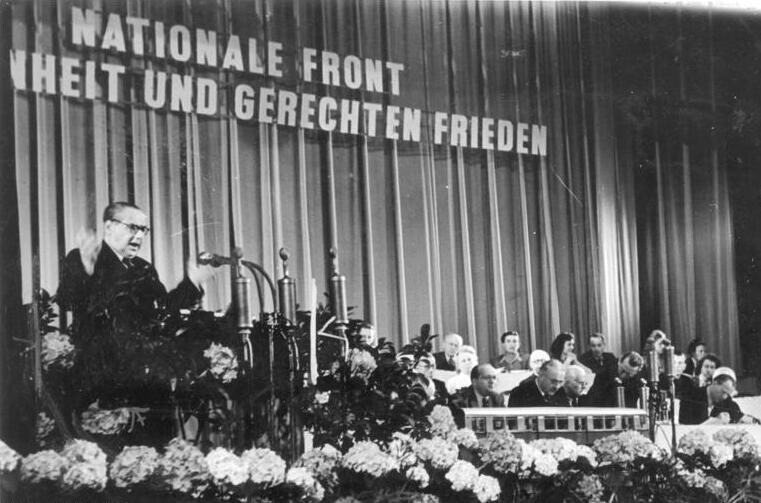
Hermann Kastner address the third German People's Congress in Admiralspalast, Berlin, May 1949

In 1945, the Soviet occupation zone in Germany (SBZ) was established according to the Yalta Agreement. The states of Mecklenburg, Saxony, Thuringia, Brandenburg, and Saxony-Anhalt were formed there. The Soviet sector of Berlin enjoyed a special status. The Soviet Military Administration in Germany (SMAD) promoted political development in its occupation zone based on its model, with the KPD (Communist Party of Germany) playing a key role, and from 1946 onward, following the unification with SPD, the Socialist Unity Party of Germany (SED). At the same time, party leader Joseph Stalin was interested in a united, neutral Germany, which is why some (pseudo-)democratic structures, such as the CDU and LDP, were permitted.

In 1947, the German People's Congress was formed as the first comprehensive representative body in the Soviet Occupation Zone, albeit with only delegates and without general elections. It included representatives of the various parties and mass organizations. In 1948, the division of Germany became more apparent after the currency reform. On May 15 and 16, 1949, the first elections to the third German People's Congress took place in the Soviet Occupation Zone. However, the only votes available were for approval or rejection of a unified list of the Democratic Bloc of all parties. After two counts, the vote was reportedly about 66 percent.

After the proclamation of the Basic Law and the founding of the Federal Republic of Germany on May 23, 1949, the German People's Council was formed in the Soviet Occupation Zone as a preliminary parliament by the German People's Congress, and the Constitution of East Germany was adopted. The Soviet Union, however, still hesitated to establish a new state. Only after the election of Konrad Adenauer as Chancellor of the Federal Republic of Germany on September 15 did an SED delegation, including Wilhelm Pieck, Otto Grotewohl, Walter Ulbricht, and other leading officials, travel to Moscow on September 16 for secret consultations. There, they presented their proposals for the founding of the German Democratic Republic. However, they had to wait ten days until Joseph Stalin gave his written consent to the detailed founding process negotiated with Soviet officials; they never met him in person.

After their return to East Berlin, preparations for the founding of the new state were made. However, the planned elections were postponed until mid-1950, which caused discontent among the bourgeois parties CDU and LDP, as they had hoped for a good election result.

== Events ==
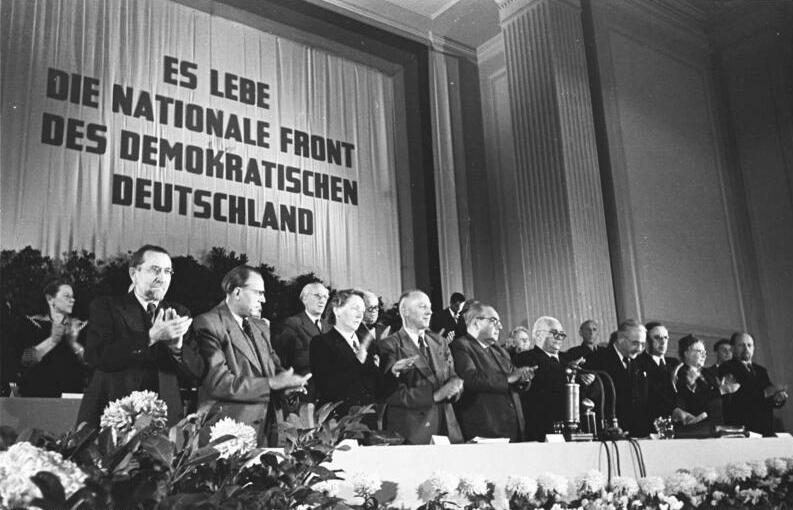
The foundation ceremony of the Germany Democratic Republic at the Building of Council of Ministers, October 7, 1949

On Friday, October 7, 1949, the German People's Council met at noon for its last session at the Building of Council of Ministers (which also housed the German Economic Commission) on Leipziger Straße. It dissolved and, after a recess, constituted itself as the Provisional People's Chamber.

The session resumed around 5 p.m. co-chairman of the Socialist Unity Party of Germany, Wilhelm Pieck was the first speaker. The law enacting the Constitution of the German Democratic Republic was then passed. Otto Grotewohl was tasked with forming the government. He then spoke first in the debate on the manifesto of the National Front of Democratic Germany. The National Front of the German Democratic Republic was also proclaimed.

On October 8, a new interzonal agreement (Frankfurt Agreement) was signed between representatives of East Germany and the Federal Republic of Germany in Frankfurt am Main on free trade between the two countries. (Its earlier planned conclusion had been postponed by the U.S occupation authorities.) The West Germany thus recognized the East Germany as an independent negotiating partner, even though it had often refused to do so.

On October 9, the SED party executive met. The meeting also discussed the future strategic approach toward the bourgeois parties CDU and LDP.

In the afternoon, there was a soccer match between a Hungarian and an East German selection in the new Stadion Mitte in Berlin in front of approximately 30,000 spectators.

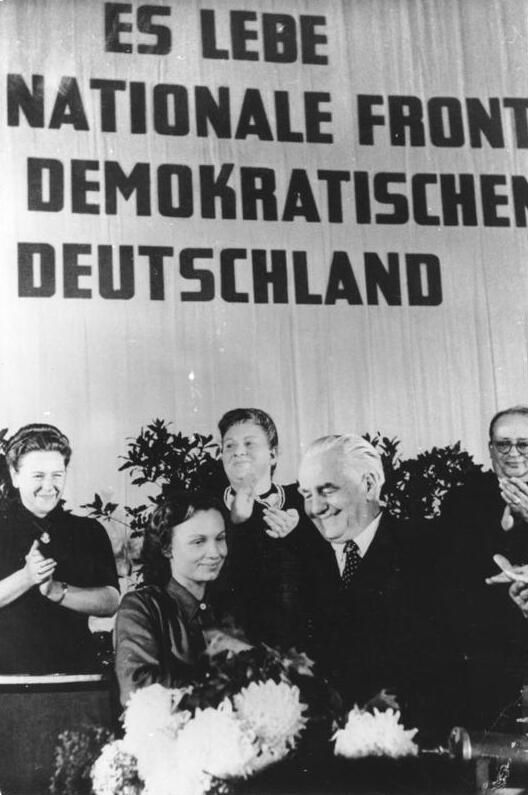
The youngest member of the Volkskammer, Margot Feist, congratulates Wilhelm Pieck on his election as President of the GDR on 11 October 1949

On October 10, the East Germany's Chamber of States was formed. It included representatives from Mecklenburg, Brandenburg, Saxony-Anhalt, Saxony, and Thuringia, with some East Berlin delegates having the right to observe.

Wilhelm Pieck asked the poet Johannes R. Becher to write lyrics for the East Germany's national anthem.

Around 8 p.m., future president Wilhelm Pieck, future Prime Minister Otto Grotewohl, SED General Secretary Walter Ulbricht, and several future government members arrived at the Soviet army headquarters of the Soviet Military Administration in Germany, General Vasily Chuikov, and his staff in Karlshorst district of Berlin. (The German Instrument of Surrender had also been signed there on May 8, 1945.) After a welcoming address, General Chuikov transferred administrative functions for the territory of East Germany to the future government. The Soviet Military Administration in Germany was transformed into the Soviet Control Commission (SKK), which officially was only to monitor compliance with the Potsdam Agreement.

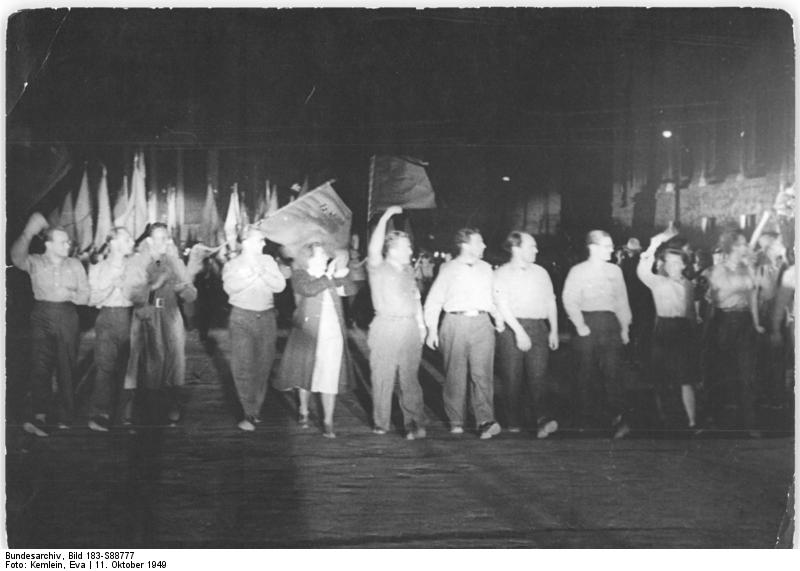
Mass rally in East Berlin on October 11, 1949

On October 11, Wilhelm Pieck was elected the first President of East Germany by the Provisional People's Chamber and the Chamber of States.

In the evening, there was a large demonstration with an official total of 200,000 Free German Youth members along Unter den Linden. These had been brought from all over the East Germany by trains and trucks. There was also a torchlit procession. FDJ chairman Erich Honecker recited the youth's oath to the German Democratic Republic.

On October 12, the Provisional Volkskammer met for the second time, again on Leipziger Straße. Prime Minister Otto Grotewohl presented his government, which included members of the SED and the bloc parties Christian Democratic Union (CDU), Liberal Democratic Party of Germany (LDP), National Democratic Party of Germany (NDPD), and Democratic Farmers' Party of Germany (DBD). This government was confirmed by the Provisional People's Chamber. Otto Grotewohl delivered his government declaration. The administrative functions of the German Economic Commission were transferred to the Provisional Government.

In the evening, the government was sworn-in by president Wilhelm Pieck at his official residence, the Schönhausen Palace in Niederschönhausen district of Berlin. This formally concluded the founding of the German Democratic Republic.

Celebrations were held in schools in East Berlin that day to mark the formation of the government. Schools then closed.

== Further events ==
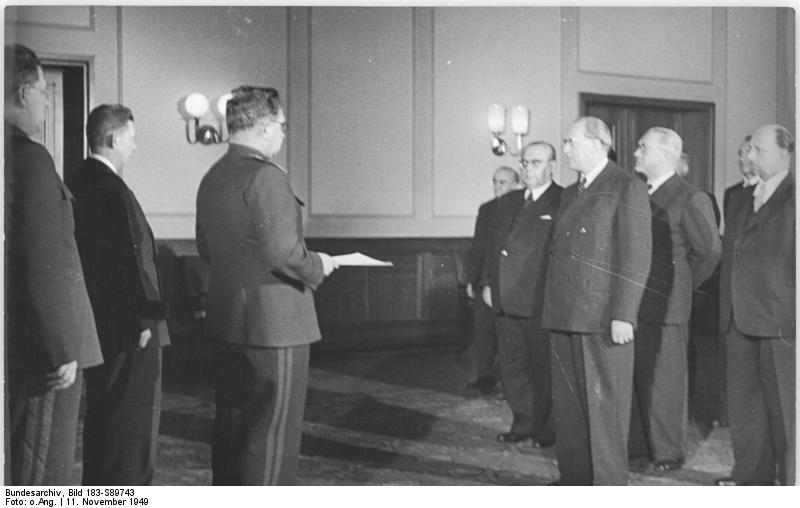
The GDR government under Vasily Ivanovich Chuikov: Transfer of administrative sovereignty in Berlin-Karlshorst on 11 November 1949

Over the next few weeks, the structures of the new state continued to be established.

On October 15, the Soviet Union formally established diplomatic relations with East Germany, followed by People's Republic of Bulgaria on October 17, Polish People's Republic and Czechoslovakia on October 18, Hungarian People's Republic on October 19, and Socialist Republic of Romania on October 22.

On November 5, the Central Committee of the Socialist Unity Party of Germany (SED) declared "Auferstanden aus Ruinen" (Rise from Ruins) by Johannes R. Becher and Hanns Eisler the national anthem of East Germany, and the Council of Ministers officially adopted this on the same day. On November 7, it was publicly performed for the first time at a state ceremony marking the anniversary of the October Revolution.

On November 11, the Provisional People's Chamber reconvened. The members of the government also attended a reception hosted by the Soviet Control Commission led by Vasily Chuikov at Soviet military headquarters in Berlin-Karlshorst. There, they were informed about the completion of the changes in the Soviet military administration.

On December 5, the Supreme Court and the General Prosecutor's Office of East Germany were established.

== Assessment ==
The new Provisional Government of the German Democratic Republic assumed the administrative and powers of the Soviet Military Administration in Germany and the German Economic Commission. However, it was not legitimized by elections, as was the West German federal government after the federal elections in August 1949. This made it vulnerable, but it would not have won free elections at that time. Maintaining power for ideological reasons remained an important foundation of its rule, even after the successful sham elections of 1950.

Gerhart Eisler said that "If we establish a government, we never give it up again, neither through elections nor other methods. Walter Ulbricht added that "Some have not yet understood that."

== See also ==
- Merger of the KPD and SPD
- Proclamation of the German Empire
- Proclamation of the republic in Germany
