= German election, 1949 =

German election, 1949 may refer to

- West German federal election, 1949, or
- East German Constitutional Assembly election, 1949
