= Provisional Government of the German Democratic Republic =

Government of the German Democratic Republic

First cabinet of Otto Grotewohl Cabinet Grotewohl I
- Provisional government of the German Democratic Republic

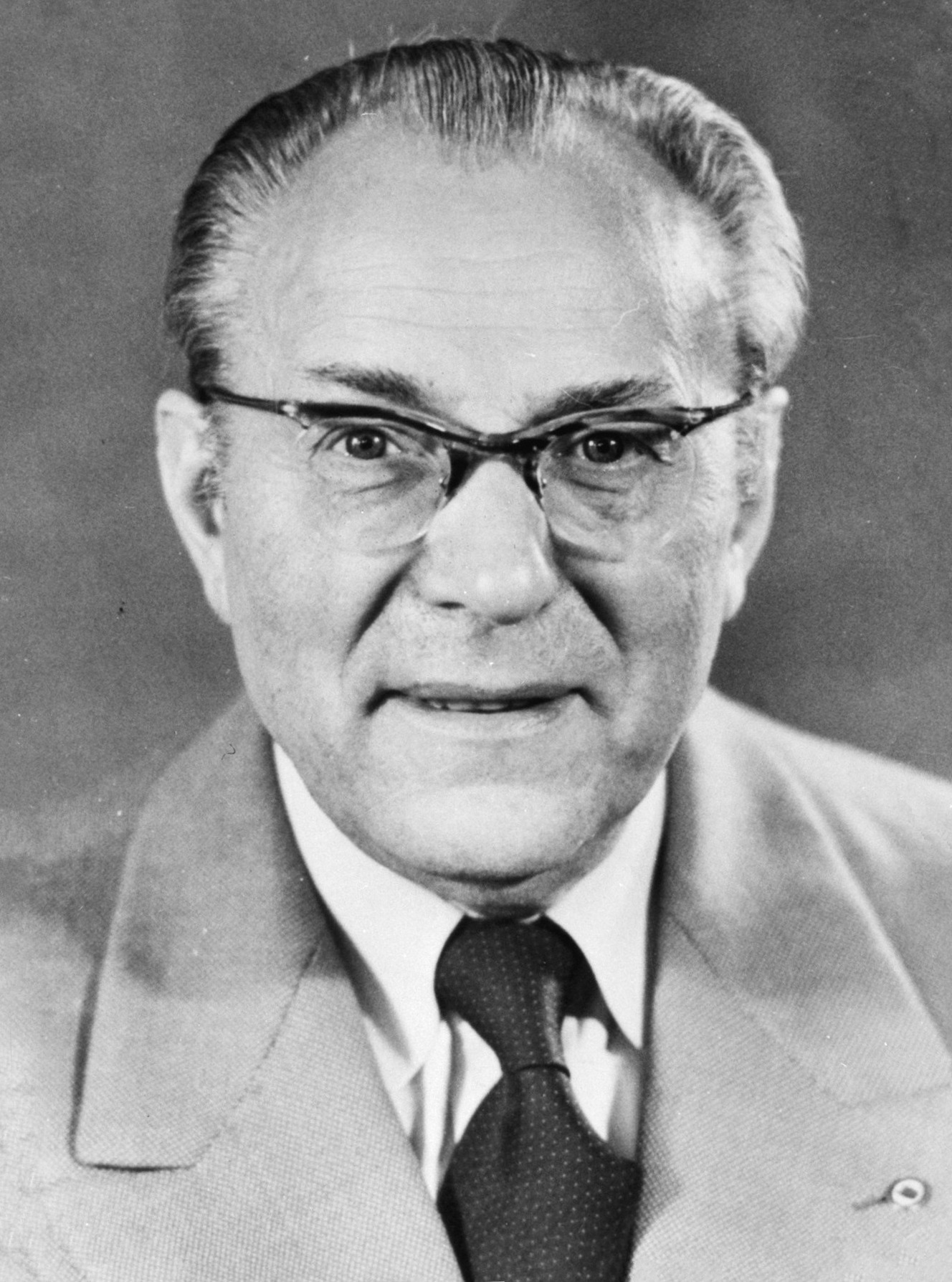
- Date formed: 7 October 1949
- Date dissolved: 7 November 1950

People and organisations
- President: Johannes Dieckmann (acting); Wilhelm Pieck
- Minister-President: Otto Grotewohl
- No. of ministers: 15

History
- Legislature terms: Provisional Volkskammer
- Predecessor: Flensburg Government (Nazi Germany), Allied Control Council, German Economic Commission (Soviet Military Administration)
- Successor: Grotewohl II

The First cabinet of Otto Grotewohl, also known as the Provisional Government of the GDR, was formed by a law on the government of the GDR (passed by the Provisional People's Chamber) on October 7, 1949. According to the law, members of the government were: the prime minister, his 3 deputies and his 14 ministers. The number of ministers would increase to 15 after the State Security Department was elevated to a ministry by the Law on the Formation of a Ministry for State Security of February 8, 1950). It existed until November 7, 1950, after which the Council of Ministers became the government of the GDR as the Second cabinet of Otto Grotewohl.

== Ministries ==
The government consisted of:

Portfolio	Minister	Took office	Left office	Party
Minister-President	Otto Grotewohl	7 October 1949	7 November 1950	SED
Deputy Minister-President	Walter Ulbricht	7 October 1949	7 November 1950	SED
Deputy Minister-President	Hermann Kastner	7 October 1949	1 July 1950	LDPD
Deputy Minister-President	Otto Nuschke	7 October 1949	7 November 1950	CDU
Ministry of Agriculture and Forestry	Ernst Goldenbaum	7 October 1949	7 November 1950	DBD
Ministry of Construction	Lothar Bolz	7 October 1949	7 November 1950	NDPD
Ministry of Finance	Hans Loch	7 October 1949	7 November 1950	LDPD
Ministry of Foreign Affairs	Georg Dertinger	7 October 1949	7 November 1950	CDU
Ministry for Foreign Trade and Material Supply	Georg Ulrich Handke	7 October 1949	11 November 1949	SED
Ministry for Inner-German Trade, Foreign Trade and Material Supply	Georg Ulrich Handke	11 November 1949	7 November 1950	SED
Ministry of Industry	Fritz Selbmann	7 October 1949	7 November 1950	SED
Ministry of the Interior	Karl Steinhoff	7 October 1949	7 November 1950	SED
Ministry of Justice	Max Fechner	7 October 1949	7 November 1950	SED
Minister for Post and Telecommunications	Friedrich Burmeister	7 October 1949	7 November 1950	CDU
Ministry of Public Education	Paul Wandel	7 October 1949	7 November 1950	SED
Office for Information at the Prime Minister of the GDR	Gerhard Eisler	12 October 1949	8 February 1950	SED
Minister of State Security	Wilhelm Zaisser	8 February 1950	7 November 1950	SED
Ministry of Trade and Supply	Karl Hamann	7 October 1949	7 November 1950	LDPD
Ministry of Transport	Hans Reingruber	7 October 1949	7 November 1950	Independent
Ministry for Labor and Health	Luitpold Steidle	7 October 1949	7 November 1950	CDU

== Ministry-level Committees ==
Portfolio	Minister	Took office	Left office	Party
Chairman of the State Planning Commission	Heinrich Rau	7 October 1949	7 November 1950	SED

== Sources ==
- "Government declaration by Otto Grotewohl (Berlin, 12 October 1949)". 27 February 2023.
- Herbert Hömig (1985). "Loch, Hans". Neue Deutsche Biographie (in German). Vol. 14. Berlin: Duncker & Humblot. pp. 742–743. (full text online).
- Wer war wer in der DDR?
- Georg Dertinger
- Carl Steinhoff: erster DDR-Innenminister : Wandlungen eines bürgerlichen Sozialisten / Lutz Maeke
- "Biographische Datenbanken". election.de (in German).
- Gesetz über die Regierung der DDR: Online-Veröffentlichung, retrieved 10 January 2018
- Gesetz über die Bildung eines Ministeriums für Staatssicherheit: https://www.verfassungen.de/de/ddr/mfsbildung50.htm Online-Veröffentlichung, retrieved 10 January 2018.

Government offices
Preceded by German Economic Commission (Soviet Military Administration)	Cabinets of the German Democratic Republic; 12 October 1949–15 October 1950	Succeeded by Grotewohl I
