= President of Germany (disambiguation) =

President of Germany may refer to:

- the President of the Federal Republic of Germany
- a president of Germany during the Weimar Republic
- a president or similar leader of the German Democratic Republic (East Germany)
- William I, President of North German Confederation in 1866—1871.

== Lists of presidents and other heads of state ==
- List of German presidents, which includes other heads of state, acting heads of state, etc.
