= Länderkammer =

Upper chamber of East Germany (1949–1958)

Chamber of States Länderkammer
- East Germany

Type
- Type: Upper house

History
- Established: 1949; 77 years ago
- Disbanded: 1958; 68 years ago
- Preceded by: Reichsrat of the Weimar Republic
- Succeeded by: Volkskammer 1958–1990; Bundesrat 1990–date
- Seats: 50

Meeting place
- Langenbeck-Virchow-Haus

The Länderkammer (lit. 'Chamber of States') was the upper chamber of the bicameral legislature of the German Democratic Republic (East Germany) from its founding in 1949 until 1952, at which time it was largely sidelined, when the five Länder (states) of East Germany ceased to exist and were replaced with smaller administrative regions. The Chamber of States itself was dissolved on 8 December 1958. The lower chamber, which continued in existence until German reunification in 1990, was the Volkskammer (People's Chamber).

In the Federal Republic of Germany the expression Länderkammer is sometimes used to denote the Bundesrat, although it is not classified as a legislative chamber of a bicameral legislature, but one of two unicameral legislative bodies.

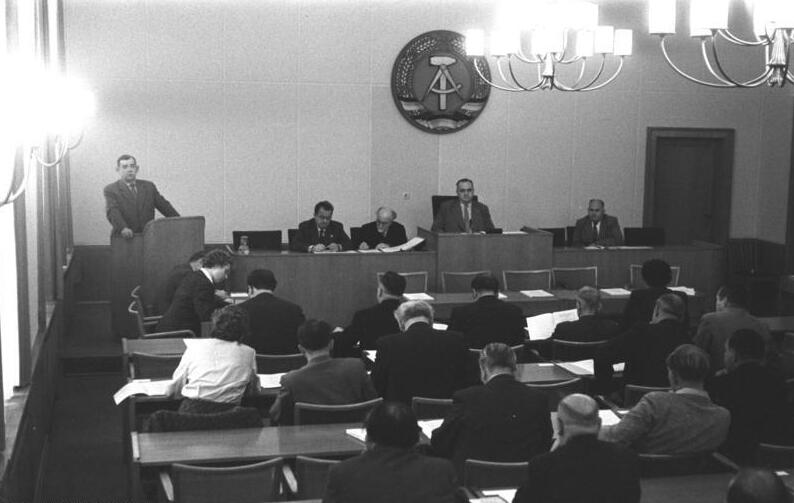
A Session of the Länderkammer in 1958. The Minister of the Interior Karl Maron is speaking.

== Idea and reality ==
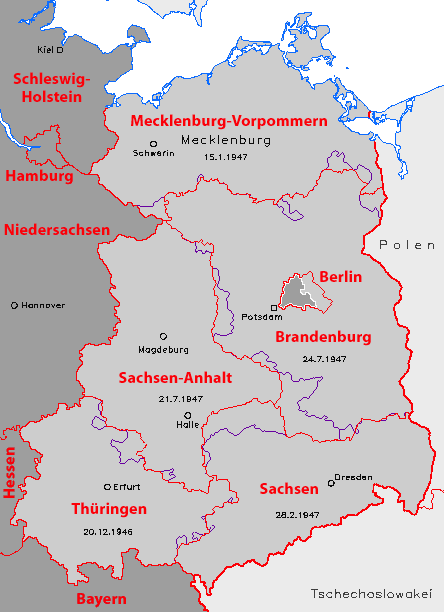
Länder in 1947 (purple), and in 1990 (red)

After 1945, the Soviet military administration established the five Länder of Mecklenburg-Vorpommern, Brandenburg, Saxony, Saxony-Anhalt and Thuringia.

Initially, in 1949, the communists aimed for a quasi-unitary state, with some degree of decentralization. Laws were to be made by the central legislature in East Berlin, and the Länder authorities were responsible for the implementation of the laws.

In practice, due to the democratic centralism of the SED, the GDR rapidly developed strong centralist tendencies. However, it initially operated in this bicameral framework in which the states were represented. The Länderkammer theoretically had the power to introduce bills and to veto laws proposed by the Volkskammer, although another vote in the Volkskammer could overturn such a veto. The Länderkammer never made use of its veto. The two chambers also elected the President of East Germany in joint session.

According to the Constitution of East Germany, in addition to the Volkskammer, a "provisional Länderkammer" was formed. The fifty members of the Länderkammer were to be determined by the assemblies in the various Länder, according to the memberships of these assemblies. Saxony sent thirteen delegates, Saxony-Anhalt eleven, Thuringia ten, Brandenburg nine, and Mecklenburg-Vorpommern seven. East Berlin sent thirteen delegates, but they did not have voting rights owing to Berlin as a whole still legally being occupied territory. (A similar arrangement existed in West Berlin, in which the city's delegates in the Bundestag and Bundesrat had no voting rights.)

In 1952, the East German Länder transferred their administrative functions to the smaller regional districts (Bezirke), effectively dissolving themselves. The Länderkammer remained in existence, but became increasingly redundant. Since the Landtages could no longer meet to elect members of the Länderkammer, the 1954 delegates for each Länder were chosen by a special meeting of the District Assemblies (Bezirkstage) of that state. The members of the Länderkammer elected in 1958 were directly elected by their Bezirkstage. These delegates were appointed as a "suicide squad," raising no objection as the Volkskammer abolished the Länderkammer and the Länder on 8 December 1958.

== Presidents of the Länderkammer ==
Name	Period	Party
Reinhold Lobedanz	October 11, 1949 – March 5, 1955	CDU
August Bach	March 5, 1955 – December 8, 1958	CDU

== Vice-Presidents of the Länderkammer ==
Name	Period	Party
August Frölich	1950 – 1958	SED
Hans Luthardt	1950 – 1958	NDPD
Erich Hagemeier	1950 – 1954	LDPD
Dr. Karl Mühlmann	1954 – 1958	LDPD
Max Suhrbier	1958	LDPD
Dietrich Besler	1950 – 1954	DBD
Albert Rödiger	1954 – 1958	DBD

== See also ==
- Administrative divisions of the German Democratic Republic
- Politics of East Germany
