= 1968 East German constitutional referendum =

East German referendum

6 April 1968

Results
Choice	Votes	%
Yes	11,536,803	96.57%
No	409,733	3.43%
Valid votes	11,946,536	99.80%
Invalid or blank votes	24,353	0.20%
Total votes	11,970,889	100.00%
Registered voters/turnout	12,208,986	98.05%

A constitutional referendum was held in East Germany on 6 April 1968. The new constitution was approved by 96.4% of voters, with turnout reported to be 98.1%, and came into force on 9 April.

== Background ==
On 1 December 1967 the Volkskammer established a commission to draw up a new constitution. This was by the Volkskammer with no dissenting votes on 26 March 1968, alongside a law on conducting a referendum to approve the constitution.

== Results ==
Choice	Votes	%
For	11,536,803	96.4
Against	409,733	3.4
Invalid/blank votes	24,353	–
Total	11,970,889	100
Registered voters/turnout	12,208,986	98.1
Source: Nohlen & Stöver
