= Democratic Bloc (East Germany) =

Political party in East Germany

The Democratic Bloc of Parties and Mass Organisations (German: Demokratischer Block der Parteien und Massenorganisationen) was the term used for the popular front of parties and mass organizations that, in accordance with the 1949 Constitution of the GDR and the GDR electoral laws, were entitled to submit electoral nominations for the Volkskammer as well as for the legislative bodies of municipalities, districts, and states in Soviet-occupied East Germany and the first years of the German Democratic Republic.

The "Democratic Bloc" was not a formal organization but a constitutional term for the arrangement of parties and mass organizations led by the SED. The term continued to be used even after the creation of the National Front in 1950, which was a formal organization that was explicitly included in the 1968 GDR Constitution.

== History ==
In parallel with the working staff of the CPSU European Advisory Commission commissioned in early 1944 to develop the exiled Communist Germany own political concept. A first draft was on 6 March 1944 on a working session of the exiled Communist Party presented by Wilhelm Florin. The guidelines developed by the Soviet concept of the future Communist Party saw as a government. After the unconditional surrender of the Wehrmacht on 8 May 1945 and the Berlin Declaration of the Commander in Chief of the four victorious powers of 5 June 1945 all political activity was prohibited in all zones of occupation. After consultation by Anton Ackermann, and Walter Ulbricht Gustav Sobottka on 4 June 1945 in Moscow allowed the Order № 2 of 10 of the Soviet Military Administration in Germany in June 1945, the formation and activity of anti-fascist parties in the Soviet Occupation Zone. With its call of 11 June 1945, the Communist Party came to Berlin as first advertised to the public and for cooperation:

The Central Committee of Communist Party of Germany is in the opinion that the above program can be used as a basis for the creation of a bloc of anti-fascist democratic parties (the Communist Party, the Social Democratic Party, the Centre Party and others) are used. We believe that such a block can form the solid foundation in the fight for the complete liquidation of the remnants of the Hitler regime and for the establishment of a democratic regime.

In addition to the block at the zone level corresponding blocks were set up at the country level. In Brandenburg, the existing three members from the four-party anti-fascist came together to comprise the democratic unit block of Brandenburg on 28 November 1945. In Thuringia, the antifascist-democratic bloc of Thuringia was formed on 17 August 1945. In Saxony and Saxony-Anhalt was founded on 29 August 1945.

In 1950, the National Front was founded as a formal organization for the popular front, though the term "Democratic Bloc" continued to be used to describe the arrangement.

== Electoral history ==
=== Deutscher Volkskongress elections ===
Election	Votes	%	Seats	+/–	Position	Government
1949	7,943,949	66.07%	1,525 / 1,525	▲1525	▲1st	Sole legal coalition
