= 1949 East German Constitutional Assembly election =

- 15–16 May 1949

All 1,525 seats in the German People's Congress
- Turnout: 95.23%
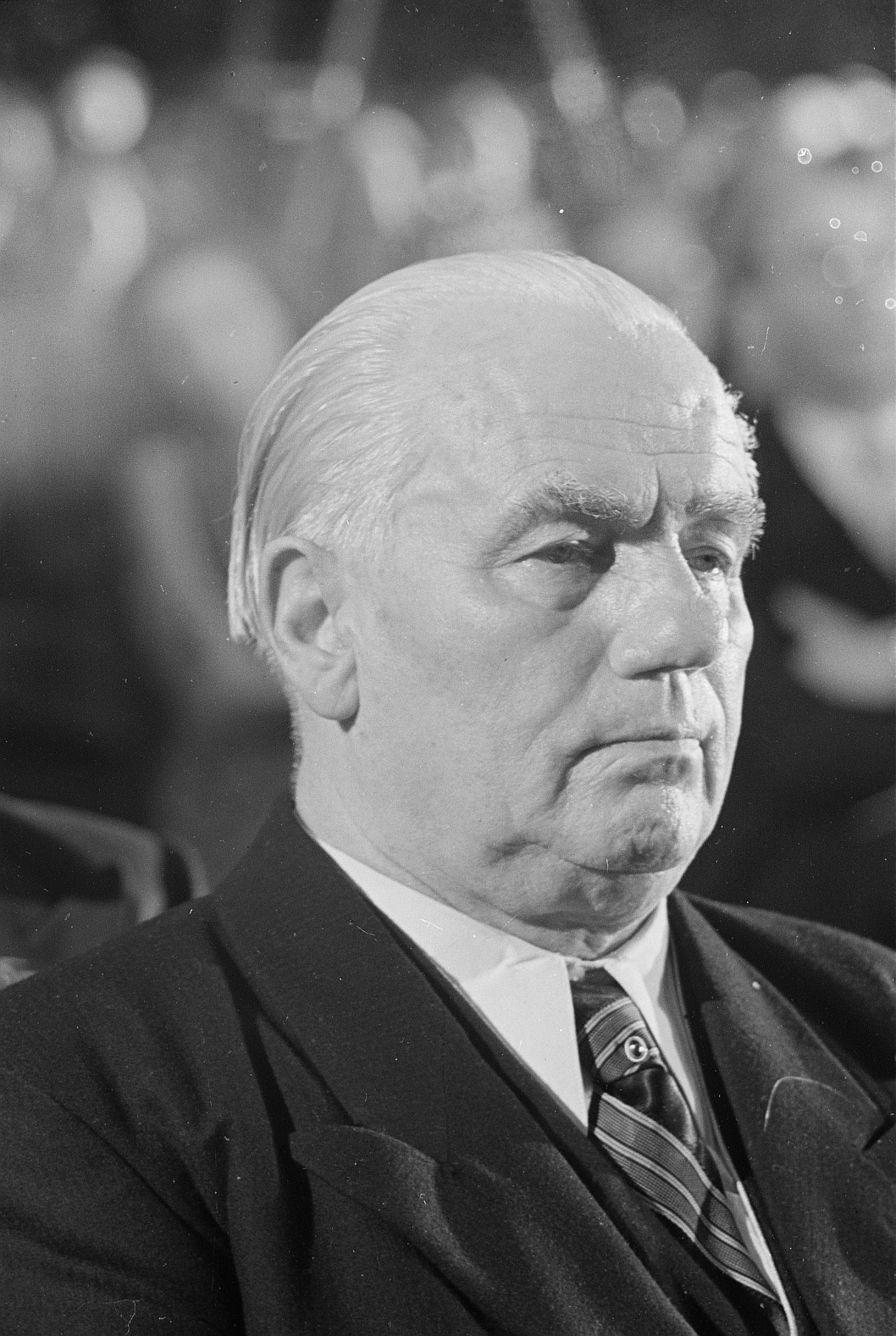
	First party
Leader	Wilhelm Pieck
Party	SED
Alliance	Democratic Bloc
Leader since	22 April 1946
Seats won	1,525
Chairman of the Council of Ministers after election
Otto Grotewohl
SED

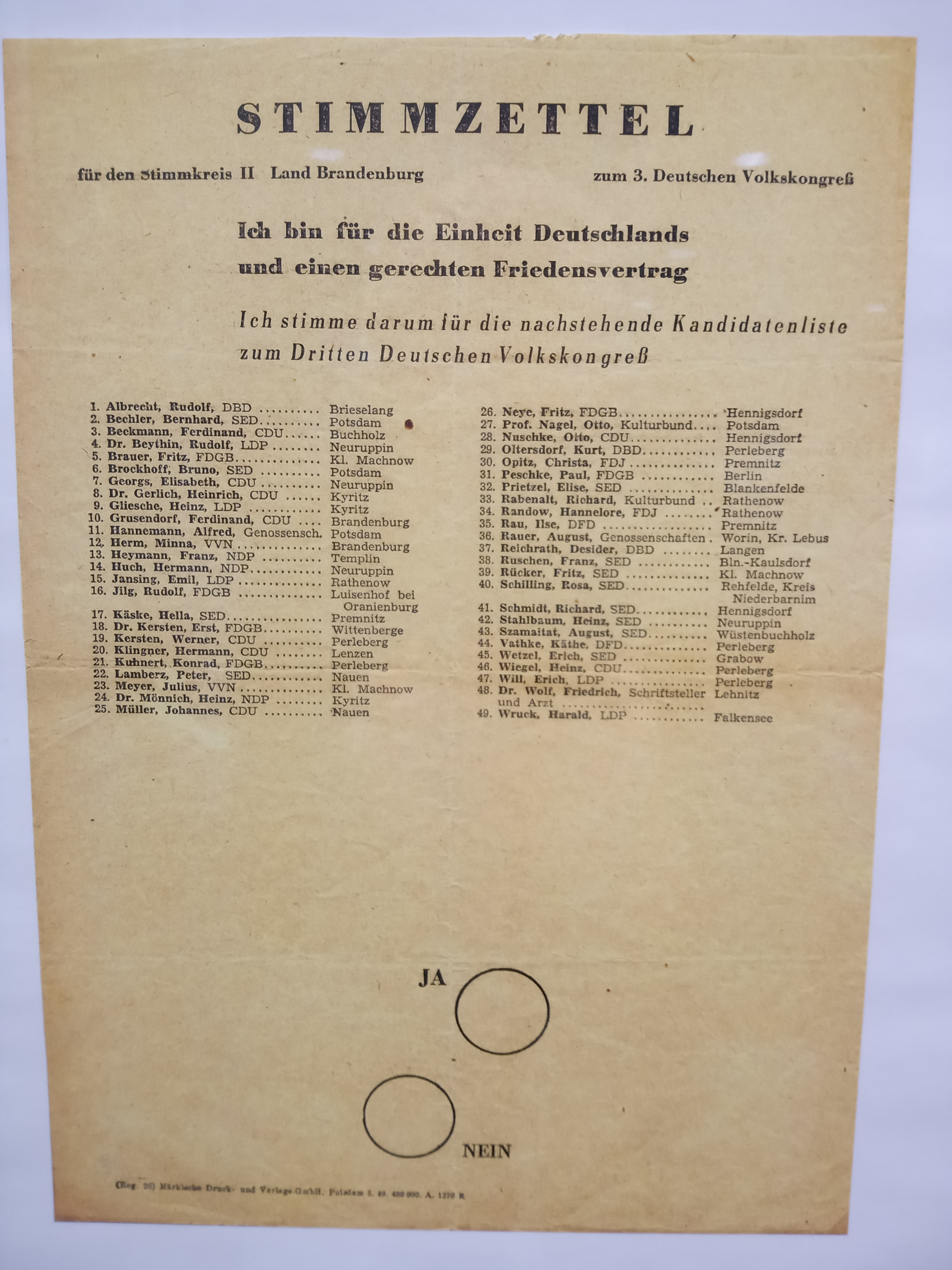
Ballot paper

Elections for the Third German People's Congress were held in East Germany on 15 and 16 May 1949. Voters were presented with a "Unity List" from the "Bloc of the Anti-Fascist Democratic Parties," which was dominated by the Communist-leaning Socialist Unity Party of Germany (SED).

== Overview ==
The ballot was worded "I am for the unity of Germany and a just peace treaty. I therefore vote for the following list of candidates for the Third German People's Congress." with voters having the options of voting "yes" and "no". (German: Ich bin für die Einheit Deutschlands und einen gerechten Friedensvertrag. Ich stimme darum für die nachstehende Kandidatenliste zum Dritten Deutschen Volkskongreß.) In much of the country, the vote was not secret.

According to official figures, 95.2 percent of eligible voters cast their ballots, with 66 percent approving the list. This was the lowest level of support ever recorded for an SED-dominated bloc during the four decades of Communist rule, despite conditions that made actual competition prohibitively difficult. In all subsequent elections until the Peaceful Revolution four decades later, the National Front, successor of the Democratic Bloc, would consistently claim 99 percent or more of the vote.

== Results ==
Party or alliance		Votes	%	Seats
Democratic Bloc	Socialist Unity Party	7,943,949	66.07	450
Democratic Bloc	Christian Democratic Union	7,943,949	66.07	225
Democratic Bloc	Liberal Democratic Party	7,943,949	66.07	225
Democratic Bloc	Cooperatives	7,943,949	66.07	100
Democratic Bloc	Democratic Farmers' Party	7,943,949	66.07	75
Democratic Bloc	National Democratic Party	7,943,949	66.07	75
Democratic Bloc	Democratic Women's League	7,943,949	66.07	50
Democratic Bloc	Free German Trade Union Federation	7,943,949	66.07	50
Democratic Bloc	Free German Youth	7,943,949	66.07	50
Democratic Bloc	Cultural Association	7,943,949	66.07	50
Democratic Bloc	Peasants Mutual Aid Association	7,943,949	66.07	50
Democratic Bloc	Union of Persecutees of the Nazi Regime	7,943,949	66.07	50
Democratic Bloc	Social Democratic Party (East Berlin)	7,943,949	66.07	25
Democratic Bloc	Independents	7,943,949	66.07	50
Against		4,080,272	33.93	–
Total		12,024,221	100.00	1,525
Valid votes		12,024,221	93.30	
Invalid/blank votes		863,013	6.70	
Total votes		12,887,234	100.00	
Registered voters/turnout		13,533,071	95.23	
Source: Nohlen & Stöver

== Aftermath ==
The Constitutional Assembly adopted East Germany's first constitution in October, and proclaimed the establishment of the German Democratic Republic on 7 October. It then transformed itself into the first Volkskammer.
