= Hermann Kastner =

German jurist and politician (1886–1957)

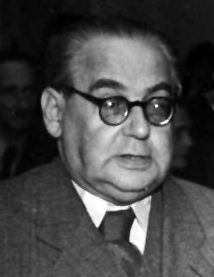
- Kastner in 1949

Deputy Prime Minister
- In office 11 October 1949 – July 1950
- Prime Minister: Otto Grotewohl
- Preceded by: Office established
- Succeeded by: Heinrich Rau

Personal details
- Born: 25 October 1886 Berlin, German Empire
- Died: 4 September 1957 (aged 70) Munich, West Germany
- Party: German Democratic Party; German State Party; Liberal Democratic Party of Germany
- Education: University of Berlin; University of Jena

Hermann Kastner (1886–1957) was a German politician and served as the deputy prime minister of East Germany between 1949 and 1950. He co-founded the Liberal Democratic Party of Germany (LDPD). He defected and obtained political asylum from West Germany shortly before he died in Munich.

== Early life and education ==
Kastner was born in Berlin on 25 October 1886. His father was a teacher. After graduating from a high school in Berlin in 1904 he received a degree in law and economics from the University of Berlin in 1908. Next year he obtained his doctorate degree in law from the University of Jena with a dissertation on the Reich Vaccination Law of 1874. In his thesis Kastner adopted a liberal approach towards the vaccination laws arguing that compulsory vaccination should be abolishee and that those who did not want to be vaccinated should only be fined an amount of money.

== Career and activities ==
Kastner worked at different city councils between 1912 and 1917. He joined the Prince Leopold Academy for Administrative and Constitutional Law in Detmold as a professor of law and was the president of the Imperial Cities Association from 1917 to 1919. He became a member of the German Democratic Party (DDP) in 1918 and began to work as a lawyer in Dresden from 1920. He was elected to the Saxony State Parliament in 1922 for the DDP, and his tenure lasted until 1930. He continued to serve at the Parliament between 1930 and 1933 during which he represented the German State Party.

Kastner cofounded the Democratic Party of Germany in 1945 which was renamed the Liberal Democratic Party of Germany in August that year. He was the president of the Saxony Bar and Notary Association from 1945 to 1946 and the chairman of the Saxony State Association of the LDPD from 1945 to 1947. He was a member of the Presidium of the Consultative Assembly of Saxony in 1946 and a member of the Saxon State Parliament for the LDPD between 1946 and 1950. He served as the vice president of the Parliament from 1946 to 1948. He was the minister of justice in the cabinets led first by Rudolf Friedrichs and then by Max Seydewitz between 14 December 1946 and 10 April 1948. He was also the deputy prime minister of Saxony.

Kastner was named as the first deputy chair of the LDPD in April 1948 and held the post until 1949. He became its chair along with Karl Hamann in October 1949, and his tenure lasted until July 1950. During this period he was also a deputy in the Provisional People's Chamber. He was appointed deputy prime minister of East Germany as part of the cabinet led by Prime Minister Otto Grotewohl in October 1949 and was in office until July 1950. Kastner was succeeded by Heinrich Rau as deputy prime minister in November 1950.

Kastner was expelled from the LDPD on 25 July 1950. The reason for his removal from both the post of deputy premiership and from the LDPD was the defection of his son to West Germany on 18 April 1950. Kastner was rehabilitated in 1951. He was named as the chairman of the Promotion Committee for Intelligence at the East German Council of Ministers with the rank of state secretary in 1951 which he held until 1955. He visited the Soviet Union before Stalin's death and met with Stalin in Crimea which was arranged by Vladimir Semyonov.

== Personal life, later years and death ==
Kastner converted to Catholicism in 1935. His first wife divorced him in 1944. He had a son who defected to West Germany in April 1950 and a daughter from this marriage. His second wife was Trude Mirtsching, a stenographer.

Kastner left East Germany with his wife in September 1956, and they received political asylum from West Germany in October 1956. He died of a heart attack in Munich on 4 September 1957 when he was on a train.

Years later it was revealed that Kastner was the leading informer of the Gehlen Organization, an intelligence agency established by the USA following the end of World War II.
