= Constitution of East Germany =

Constitution of the German Democratic Republic

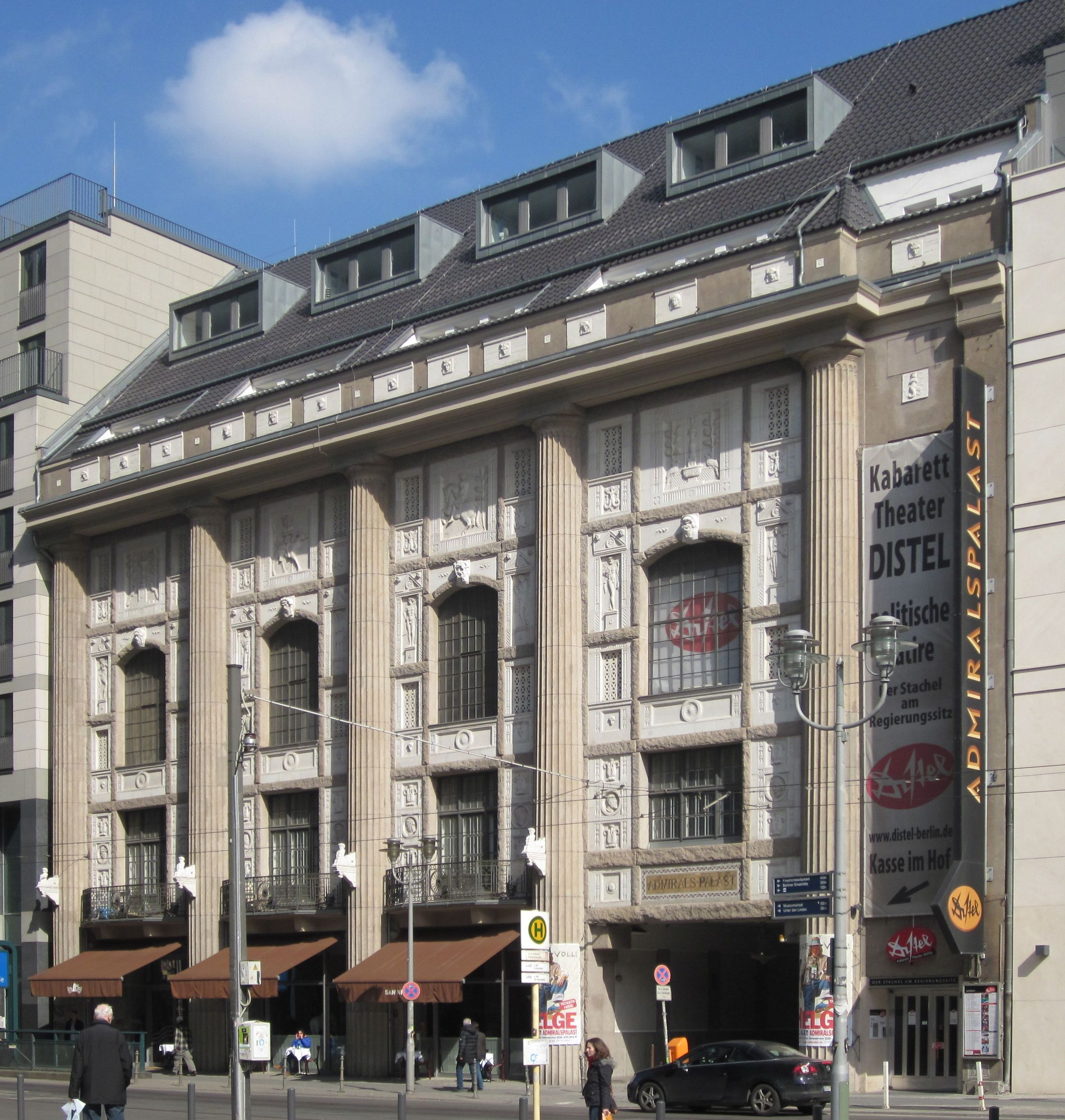
Admiralspalast in Berlin, site of the German People's Congress where the first GDR constitution was drafted.

The original Constitution of East Germany (the German Democratic Republic; German: Verfassung der Deutschen Demokratischen Republik) was promulgated on 7 October 1949. It was heavily based on the Weimar Constitution (Weimarer Reichsverfassung) and nominally established the GDR as a liberal democratic republic. In 1968, the East German government adopted a new, fully Communist constitution that was based on Marxism–Leninism, political unitarism, and collective leadership. There were further amendments to the 1968 constitution in 1974. With the political events of 1989, the 1968 constitution was purged of its Communist character. There were attempts to draft a completely new constitution for East Germany, but these efforts never materialized as momentum grew for unification with West Germany (the Federal Republic of Germany). The following October, East Germany ceased to exist, and its territory merged into West Germany.

== Background ==
In 1947 the German People's Congress met in Berlin. The People's Congress was meant to be an alternative to the Western London Conference of Foreign Ministers taking place at the same time. The People's Congress' aim was to establish an assembly which would represent the entire German nation and determine the nation's political future and prevent the division of post-war Germany. In all there were 2215 delegates sent to the congress (664 of whom represented Germans in zones occupied by the Western Powers). The second Congress, which had by this point been outlawed in Western occupied zones, met a year later and elected a Council (Volksrat). This council would seek to serve as an assembly representing the entire country, irrespective of occupying nation. This assembly designated a committee whose task it was to develop a constitution. Future Minister-President Otto Grotewohl was the chairman of this committee. An election was held in May 1949 to designate a People's Council. The German People's Congress met for a third time in 1949 and accepted the drafted constitution. On October 7, 1949, the People's Council then became the People's Chamber of the East German Republic, and the Peoples' Congress was reformed into the National Front political bloc, a process that was concluded with the formal establishment of the German Democratic Republic.

== 1949 constitution ==
Constitution of the German Democratic Republic
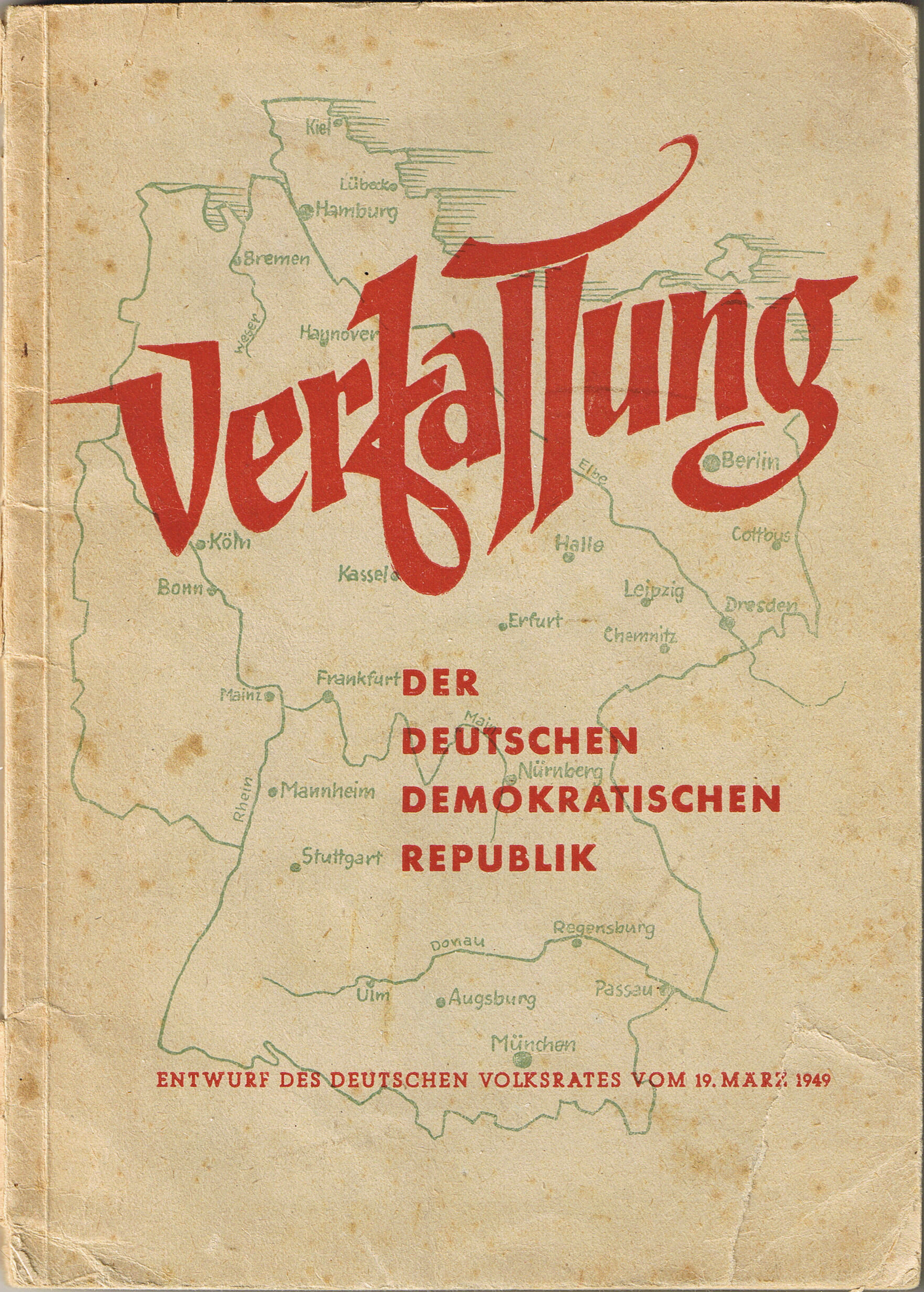
- Draft of the GDR constitution, March 1949
- Presented: 19 March 1949
- Ratified: 30 May 1949
- Date effective: 7 October 1949
- System: Federal parliamentary constitutional republic (until 1952); De facto unitary parliamentary constitutional republic (from 1952)
- Head of state: President of the Republic (until 1960); State Council (from 1960)
- Chambers: Upper House: Länderkammer (until 1958); Lower House: Volkskammer
- Executive: Council of Ministers led by the Minister President
- Judiciary: Supreme Court
- Federalism: Yes (until 1952); De jure only (from 1952)
- Repealed: 9 April 1968
- Commissioned by: German People's Congress

The German People, imbued with the desire to safeguard human liberty and rights, to reshape collective and economic life in accordance with the principles of social justice, to serve social progress, and to promote a secure peace and amity with all peoples, have adopted this Constitution.

— Preamble to the 1949 Constitution

=== Fundamentals of State Authority ===
The constitution begins by declaring the indivisibility of the German people as a nationality, and primacy of the states (Länder) in politics. The federal government is to be limited in its authority to issues which affect the whole of the nation, all other affairs falling to the states. Berlin is declared as the capital of the Republic.

The people are declared as the true source of political authority. Citizens therefore have the right to engage in political life at the local, county, and national level. This participation includes the right to vote in elections, referendums, and initiatives. Citizens also have the right to stand for election, and have the right to enter into public life whether it be political office or in the administration of justice. Citizens also have the right to petition the government.

Due to the authority emanating from the people, the constitution states the government must serve the common welfare of the people. This includes their personal liberty, providing for the general peace, and protecting democracy. Those people who are elected to office are ultimately responsible to their representative body and not to their individual party.

The constitution of the Republic is declared as the basis for all governmental action and the government must abide by its principles. The people have the right to resist any action which takes place outside of these principles. The people of the Republic and the government are also subject to international laws and statutes.

=== The Rights of the Citizen ===
The second section of the constitution deals with the rights of citizens. All citizens are declared equal before the law. However a citizen convicted of a felony is disqualified from certain rights and privileges, including the right to vote and hold public office. Gender equality is enshrined and any law which limits the equality of women is abolished.

Citizens have the right to personal liberty, privacy of the home and of the mail, and the right to live where they choose. Citizens have the right to freedom of expression within constitutionally applicable laws. This includes the freedom to assemble peacefully and unarmed. No person shall have these freedoms infringed based on their employment.

The constitution declares the freedom of the press from censorship. No citizen may be extradited, nor can non-citizens be extradited provided they are engaged in struggle similar in principle to the constitution. Citizens have the right to emigrate, and any changes to this law must be applicable to the whole nation and not on an individual basis. People have the right to free ethnic education and development. No person shall be deprived of using their native language in the judicial system, education, or politics.

Citizens are free to form societies and associations. Associations which are aligned with constitutional principles and which support democracy may be permitted to stand candidates for election.

The people have a right to labor organizing, and recognized trade unions have the right to call a strike action. The right to work is guaranteed. Every worker is entitled to recreation, annual vacation leave, sick leave and old age pension. Sundays, holidays, and May 1st are protected by law as days of rest. Citizens also have by right social insurance which provides for health, old age assistance, motherhood assistance, disability, etc. These rights shall be exercised through trade unions and work councils. All people have the right to a social insurance which provides for health, old age assistance, motherhood assistance, disability assistance, etc.

=== The Economic Order ===
The economy of the Republic is to be structured from the principles of social justice and the need to provide all people with an existence of human dignity. The constitution declares the economy must benefit the whole people and that each person will receive their fair share of the yield of production. Free enterprise is permitted as long as it fits within this scope.

The government will support co-operatives and the development of farmers, traders, and craftsmen. The economy is to be overseen by legislative bodies and it is the task of public officials to supervise and implement this economic plan. Private property is guaranteed by the state if it can exist within this scope. Inheritance is also guaranteed with inheritance tax being determined by law. Any restrictions on private property must be imposed only for the benefit of the general public.

Property and enterprises owned by war profiteers and Nazis is to be appropriated by the state without compensation. All monopolistic enterprises which seek to control production are to be abolished and prohibited. Large estates over 100 hectares are to be dissolved and redistributed without compensation.

Farmers are guaranteed ownership of their land, and intellectual workers are guaranteed rights by the state.

All mineral and exploitable resources are to be transferred to public ownership. The state shall ensure their use for the benefit of the whole of society.

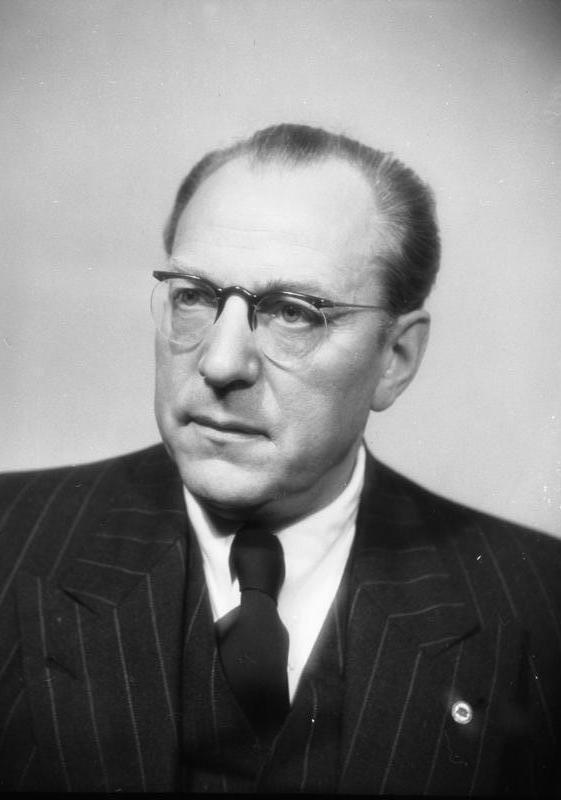
Otto Grotewohl, a SPD official who was instrumental in the creation of the SED and the 1949 Constitution.

Every citizen and family is entitled to a healthy and suitable dwelling. Considerations shall be made for victims of fascism, resettled people, severely disabled people, etc.

Property and income shall be progressively taxed with consideration made for family obligations.

=== Family and Motherhood ===
The constitution declares the family as being the foundation of collective life and is thus protected by the state. All laws pertaining to the family which undermine the equality of women are abrogated. During a woman's pregnancy she has the right to maternal care and protection from the state. The constitution outlines that institutions which protect a mother and children in their rights are to be created. Extramarital birth cannot not be ground for discrimination in any way, whether against the child or parents. Any former laws which go against this mandate are abrogated.

=== Education ===
Every citizen has an equal right to an education, may freely choose their vocation, and the teaching of art and science shall be free. The Laender will establish public school systems and the logistics for their operation, the Republic shall issue legislation to outline their basic function, and provide for the training of teachers.

It is the duty of the school to educate the students in the spirit of democracy and culture, to the end of making them responsible individuals who take part in their community. Parents shall be involved in the educational system through parent's councils.

Education is compulsory until the end of a student's 18th year. After finishing primary school, students will enter into with vocational/training or public schools. All students will also be afforded an opportunity to prepare for their admission to university through use of preparatory schools. These rights are extended to all the population.

Education is to be free. This means tuition, all text books, and instruction material that is used in compulsory education is to be furnished without cost. Scholarships will be provided to students as well based on need.

Religious education is reserved for religious institutions. These institutions are guaranteed the right to conduct religious education.

=== Organization of State Authority ===
==== Popular Representative Body ====
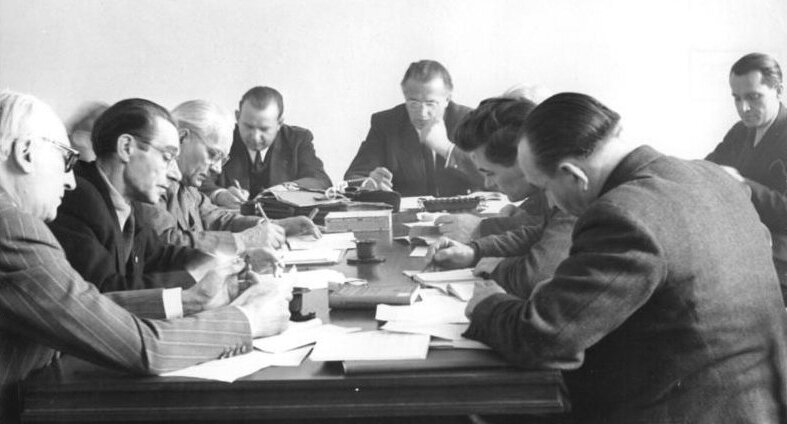
Rules Committee of the First Volkskammer, including Kurt Krüger, Felix Scheffler, and Theodor Brugsch.

The Volkskammer was referred to as the "highest organ of the Republic" (Höchstes Organ der Republik), but not as the "supreme organ of state power" (as in the Soviet model and the 1968 constitution); the 1949 constitution made reference neither to the traditional system of separate legislative, executive, and judicial branches nor to the single-branch model of fully communist constitutions.

The members of the Volkskammer, 400 in number, were constitutionally defined as representatives of "the people as a whole" and were nominally prohibited from having an imperative mandate. The Volkskammer was elected in universal, equal, direct elections on a secret ballot, by a system of proportional representation, for a term of four years; freedom and secrecy of the ballot were constitutionally guaranteed. In practice, both the prohibition of an imperative mandate and the constitutional guarantees of proportional representation and free elections were not followed; Volkskammer elections were done by a single "unity list" drawn up by the National Front of East Germany, and the allocation of seats between the SED and its bloc parties was based on pre-agreed quotas rather than voters' preferences.

All citizens over 18 years of age were eligible to vote and citizens over 21 years of age were permitted to stand for election.

The President was to convene the assembly no later than 30 days after an election. Elections were meant to take place no later than 60 days after a legislative term. In order for the assembly to dissolve (of its own power) more than half of the assembly must have consented.

The Volkskammer elected a Presidium, consisting of the President of the Volkskammer, the vice-presidents, and associate members. The Presidium was to stay in office until the next legislative section. When the assembly was not in session, three committees were to be elected to maintain government functioning: the Committee of General Affairs, the Committee of Economic and Financial affairs, and the Committee of Foreign Affairs.

A quorum consisted of at least half members being present. Unless the constitution said otherwise, legislation was to be adopted by majority vote.

The deliberations of the assembly were open to the public unless two thirds of the assembly requested an exclusion.

The functions of the Volkskammer were:

- Determine the principles of policy, and the implementation of policy
- The confirmation, supervision, and ability to recall parliament
- Determine administrative policies and the ultimate supervision of government agencies
- Legislate, except in the event of referendums
- Control of the Republic's finances, including the national budget, economic planning, loans and credit of the government, and ratifying treaties
- Granting amnesty
- Electing the President of the Republic (along with the Länderkammer), the election and recall of the members of the Supreme Court and the Prosecutor General

The Volkskammer was also to convene a Constitutional Committee. This committee was made up of representatives of political parties chosen in proportion to the composition of the Volkskammer, three members of the Supreme Court, and three German professors of constitutional law who were not also members of the Volkskammer. The Constitutional Committee was the only authority allowed to review the constitutionality of legislation; however, this was not true judicial review, as its decisions required confirmation by the Volkskammer. At least a third of the Volkskammer's membership, as well as the Volskammer presidium, the president, the government, and the Länderkammer, had the right to submit questions on unconstitutionality of laws to the Constitutional Committee; however, this right was not extended to the courts. No question of constitutionality has ever been made in practice.

==== States ====
The states were to be represented in a legislative chamber known as the Chamber of States (Länderkammer). There will be one representative for every five hundred thousand inhabitants of a state, but each state was to be represented by at least one member. The Länderkammer seemed to be inspired more by the Austrian Federal Council rather than the West German Bundesrat; like the Austrian upper chamber, Länderkammer representatives were to be elected by the legislatures of the states (Landtags) from their own membership, for the same term, and in proportion to their partisan compositions, and had free mandates and individual votes.

Like the Volkskammer, the Länderkammer also elected a Presidium made up of a president, vice-presidents, and associate members. The President of the Länderkammer was to convene the chamber whenever he deemed it necessary, or when one fifth of the members requested them to.

The meetings of the chamber were to be open to the public, but certain agenda topics may necessitate exclusion of the public. All decisions were to be decided by majority vote, unless the constitution declares otherwise.

The Länderkammer had the right to introduce legislation to the Volkskammer and could (nominally) reject legislation from the Volkskammer. The Volkskammer and Länderkammer may present their opinion to the other chamber.

Despite the abolition of the States in 1952, the Constitution continued to provide for a division of powers between a Federal and State government up until its formal repeal.

== 1968 constitution ==
Constitution of the German Democratic Republic
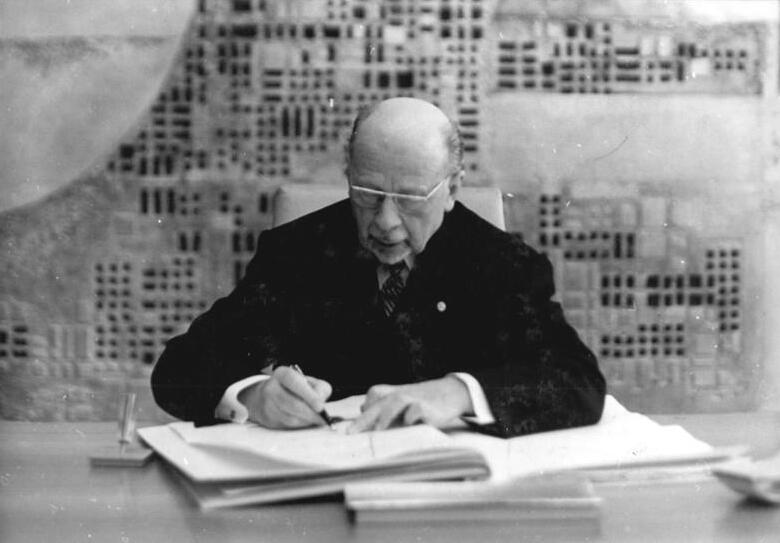
- Ulbricht signing the new constitution in the State Council boardroom, 8 April 1968
- Original title: Verfassung der Deutschen Demokratischen Republik
- Presented: 6 April 1968
- Ratified: 8 April 1968
- Date effective: 9 April 1968
- System: Unitary communist state (1968–1990); Federal parliamentary constitutional republic (from 1990)
- Head of state: State Council (until 1990); President of the Volkskammer (from 1990)
- Chambers: Volkskammer
- Executive: Council of Ministers headed by the Chairman of the Council of Ministers
- Federalism: No (until 1990); De jure only (Note: The Law on Constitutional Principles (Verfassungsgrundsätzegesetz) of 17 June 1990 already declared the DDR as a "free, democratic, federative, social and ecologically oriented Rechtstaat". However, it was only on 22 July 1990 that the State Implementation Law (Ländereinführungsgesetz), which formally defined the jurisdictions of the State governments, was passed. The Establishment of the States was initially set to take place on 14 October 1990; this was backdated to 3 October 1990 upon the signing of the German unification treaty.) (from 1990)
- Repealed: 3 October 1990

Imbued with the responsibility of showing the whole German nation the road to a future of peace and socialism, in view of the historical fact that imperialism, under the leadership of the United States of America and in concert with circles of West German monopoly capital, split Germany in order to build up West Germany as a base of imperialism and of struggle against socialism, contrary to the vital interests of the nation, the people of the German Democratic Republic, firmly based upon the achievements of the anti-fascist, democratic and socialist transformation of the socialist system, unitedly carrying on its working classes and sections the work and spirit of the Constitution of October 7, 1949, and imbued by the will to continue unswervingly and in free decision on the road of peace, social justice, democracy, socialism and international friendship, have given themselves this Socialist Constitution.

— Preamble to the 1968 Constitution

At the Seventh Party Congress of the SED in April 1967, Ulbricht called for a new constitution, declaring that the existing constitution no longer accorded "with the relations of socialist society and the present level of historical development". A new constitution was needed to conform with the Marxist–Leninist belief in the progression of history and the role of the working class led by the SED. The new constitution would also reflect the role of the state as the party's main instrument in achieving the goal of a socialist and eventually communist society. A commission in the Volkskammer was tasked in December 1967 to draft a new constitution. Two months later the commission produced a document, which, after "public debate", was submitted to a plebiscite on April 6, 1968. Approved by a 94.5 percent margin, the new Constitution went into effect three days later on 9 April 1968.

While the 1949 constitution was at least superficially a liberal democratic document, the 1968 constitution was a fully Communist document. Modeled closely on the 1936 Soviet Constitution, it integrated all the constitutional changes that had taken place since 1949 into a new "socialist" framework, but it reduced certain rights provided in the earlier version. Article 1 of the 1968 constitution began with the words, "The German Democratic Republic is a socialist state of the German nation. It is the political organization of the workers in the cities and in the countryside, who jointly under the leadership of the working class and their Marxist-Leninist party will realize Socialism."

While the old document made no mention of the SED, Article 1 of the new constitution unequivocally declared that "the leadership of the state is to be exercised through the working class and its Marxist-Leninist party"—the SED. The 1949 constitution had declared Germany a "democratic republic", whereas the new one described East Germany as a "socialist state of the German nation". Under the old constitution, power derived from "the people", while Article 2 of the new Constitution stated that power emanated from "the worker in city and country".

Significant changes introduced into the 1968 document included:

- Article 6, which committed the state to adhere to the "principles of socialist internationalism" and to devote special attention to its "fraternal ties" with the Soviet Union
- Article 9, which based the national economy on the "socialist ownership of the means of production"
- Article 20, which granted freedom of conscience and belief
- Article 21, which maintained that the "basic rights" of citizenship were inseparably linked with "corresponding obligations"
- Article 47, which declared that the principle of "democratic centralism" is the authoritative maxim for the construction of the socialist state

The 1968 document effectively codified the actual state of affairs that had prevailed in the GDR for two decades. It was one of Ulbricht's last significant victories before his ouster in 1971.

=== 1974 amendments ===
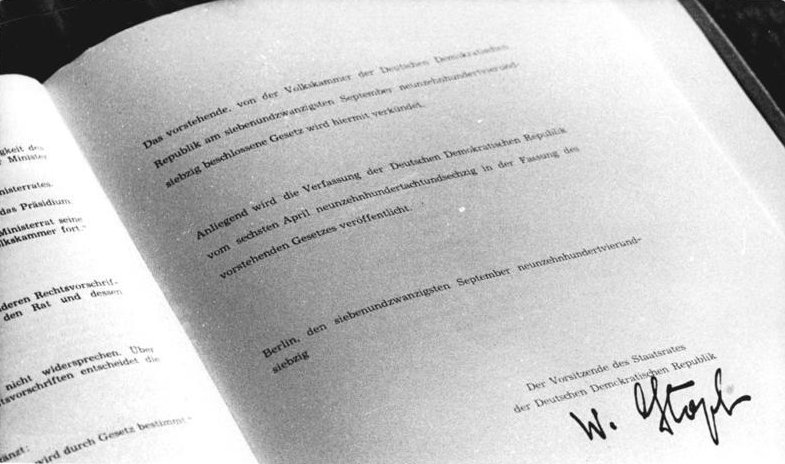
1974 amendment, signed by Chairman of the Council of State Willi Stoph.

For the first two decades of its existence, the GDR maintained that it was the sole lawful government of all of Germany, denouncing the Federal Republic as an unlawfully constituted NATO puppet state. In the early 1970s, following the rise of Erich Honecker and increased international recognition of the GDR, the SED abandoned reunification in favor of détente. The regime pursued a policy of Abgrenzung, or delimitation. The desired effect was to create a separate GDR national identity.

As a result, the 1968 constitution was amended by the Volkskammer on 27 September 1974 to delete the reference to the German nation; indeed, the use of the word "German" was cut back almost to a bare minimum. The amended document increased the emphasis on solidarity and friendship with the Soviet Union. In practice, however, ties between East Germans and their West German countrymen increased, in part due to the policies of Ostpolitik and détente followed by both East and West during the 1970s.

Article 1 of the amended constitution began with the words, "The German Democratic Republic is a socialist state of workers and farmers. It is the political organization of the workers in the cities and in the countryside under the leadership of the working class and their Marxist-Leninist party."

=== 1989–90 amendments ===
In the wake of the Peaceful Revolution and the fall of the Berlin Wall, the constitution was significantly revised in 1989 and 1990 to prune out its Communist character. Most notably, the phrase "under the leadership of the working class and their Marxist-Leninist party" in Article 1, which effectively gave the SED a monopoly of power, was deleted in December 1989; the State Council was abolished in April 1990, with its powers transferred to the Volkskammer presidium pending the re-establishment of the office of President of East Germany; a Law on Constitutional principles was passed on 17 June 1990, replacing statements about East Germany being a socialist state with those appropriate for a liberal democracy and social market economy on the West German model; and on 22 July 1990, the State Implementation Law was passed, providing for the re-establishment of the States of East Germany and the division of powers between the federal and state governments.

Article 1 of the Law on Constitutional Principles began with the words, "The German Democratic Republic is a free, democratic, federative, social and ecologically oriented Rechtsstaat. With regard to the federal system, this shall apply in accordance with a special amendment to the Constitution and legal provisions which are yet to be enacted."

== 1990 proposal ==
In April 1990, the democratic forum Runder Tisch (Round Table) developed a proposal for a new GDR constitution to reflect the democratic changes that swept across the GDR. However, by that time, the newly freely-elected Volkskammer (parliament) was moving in the direction of outright unification with the Federal Republic, and so the draft constitution went nowhere.

== See also ==
=== Constitutions of Germany ===
- Constitution of the German Empire (1871–1919)
- Weimar Constitution (1919–1933 (de jure 1949))
- Basic Law for the Federal Republic of Germany (Federal Republic of Germany, 1949–present)

=== Others ===
- History of East Germany
