= General Prosecutor's Office of East Germany =

Public prosecutor's office

The General prosecutor's of the German Democratic Republic was the highest prosecuting authority in the German Democratic Republic. According to Section 2 of the Law on the Public Prosecution Service of the German Democratic Republic, all other public prosecutor's offices in the GDR, including in particular the Chief Military Prosecutor, were subordinate to the General prosecutor. His term of office was five years (version of 1953) or four years (version of 1963), and he was elected by the People's Chamber of the GDR. The General prosecutor had the right to issue directives to the subordinate public prosecutor's offices under his authority and could appoint or dismiss them. By law, the General prosecutor was granted the right to participate in meetings of the Council of Ministers of the German Democratic Republic. The General prosecutor could also petition for cassation before the Supreme Court. He was also responsible for the criminal register and crime statistics.

== List ==
Nr.	Name	Start	End
1	Ernst Melsheimer	1949	1960
2	Josef Streit	1962	1986
3	Günter Wendland	1986	Dec. 1989
4	Harri Harland	Dec. 1989	Jan. 1990
5	Hans-Jürgen Joseph	Jan. 1990	Jun 1990
6	Günter Seidel	Jul 1990	Oct. 1990
