= Soviet occupation zone in Germany =

Allied-occupied area in Germany (1945–1949)

Soviet occupation zone in Germany Sowjetische Besatzungszone Советская оккупационная зона Германии
- Military occupation zone of the Soviet Union
- Flag of the Soviet Union

- The Soviet occupation zone in red

Anthem
- "State Anthem of the Union of Soviet Socialist Republics"
- Capital: Berlin
- Government
  - Type: Military occupation (member of the Eastern Bloc)
- Military governors
  - 1945–1946: Georgy Zhukov
  - 1946–1949: Vasily Sokolovsky
  - 1949: Vasily Chuikov
- Historical era: Post-World War II; Cold War
  - Surrender of Nazi Germany: 8 May 1945
  - German Democratic Republic established: 7 October 1949
Preceded by	Succeeded by
Nazi Germany	East Germany
- Today part of: Germany

The Soviet occupation zone in Germany (German: Sowjetische Besatzungszone (SBZ) or Ostzone, lit. 'East Zone'; Russian: Советская оккупационная зона Германии, romanized: Sovetskaya okkupatsionnaya zona Germanii) was an area of Germany that was occupied by the Soviet Union as a communist area, established as a result of the Potsdam Agreement on 2 August 1945. On 7 October 1949 the German Democratic Republic (GDR), commonly referred to in English as East Germany, was formally established in the Soviet occupation zone.

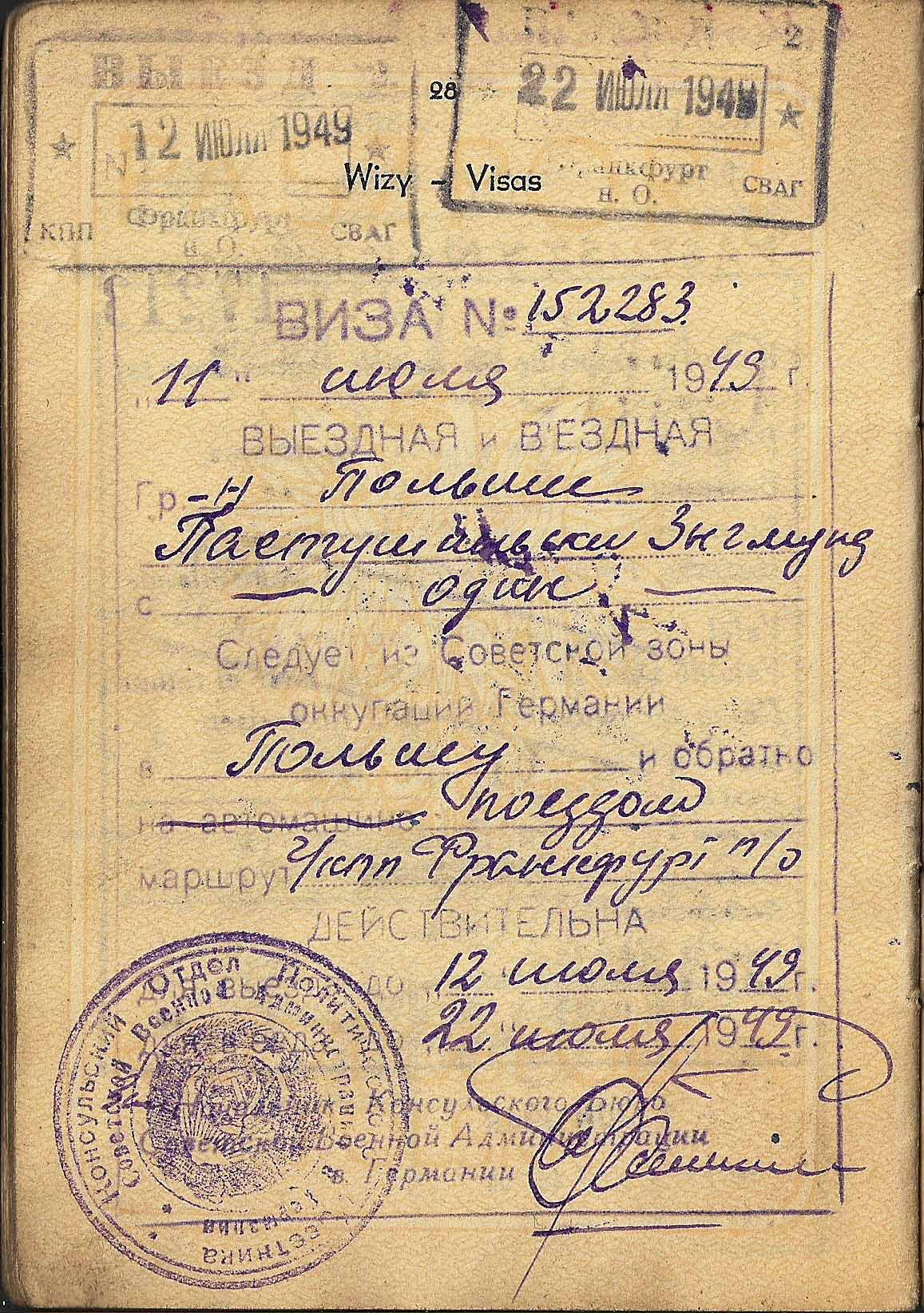
1949 Soviet visa from occupied Germany in a Polish service-passport

== Terms of the Potsdam Agreement and areas covered by the occupation ==
The SBZ was one of the four Allied occupation zones of Germany created at the end of World War II in Europe, with the Allied victory. According to the Potsdam Agreement, the Soviet Military Administration in Germany (German initials: SMAD) was assigned responsibility for the middle portion of Germany. Eastern Germany beyond the Oder-Neisse line, equal in territory to the SBZ, was to be annexed by the Polish People's Republic and its population expelled, pending a final peace conference with Germany.

== Areas ceded by the British and the Americans ==
By the time armed forces of the United States and United Kingdom began to meet Soviet Union forces, forming the Line of Contact, significant areas of what would become the Soviet zone of Germany were outside Soviet control. After several months of occupation, these gains by the British and the Americans were ceded to the Soviets by July 1945, according to the previously agreed occupation zone boundaries.

== Political parties ==
The SMAD allowed four political parties to develop, though they were all required to work together under an alliance known as the "Democratic Bloc" (later the National Front). In April 1946, the Social Democratic Party of Germany (SPD) and the Communist Party of Germany (KPD) were forcibly merged to form the Socialist Unity Party which later became the governing party of the GDR.

== Transition of the Nazi concentration camps into NKVD special camps ==
The SMAD set up ten "special camps" for the detention of Germans, making use of some former Nazi concentration camps.

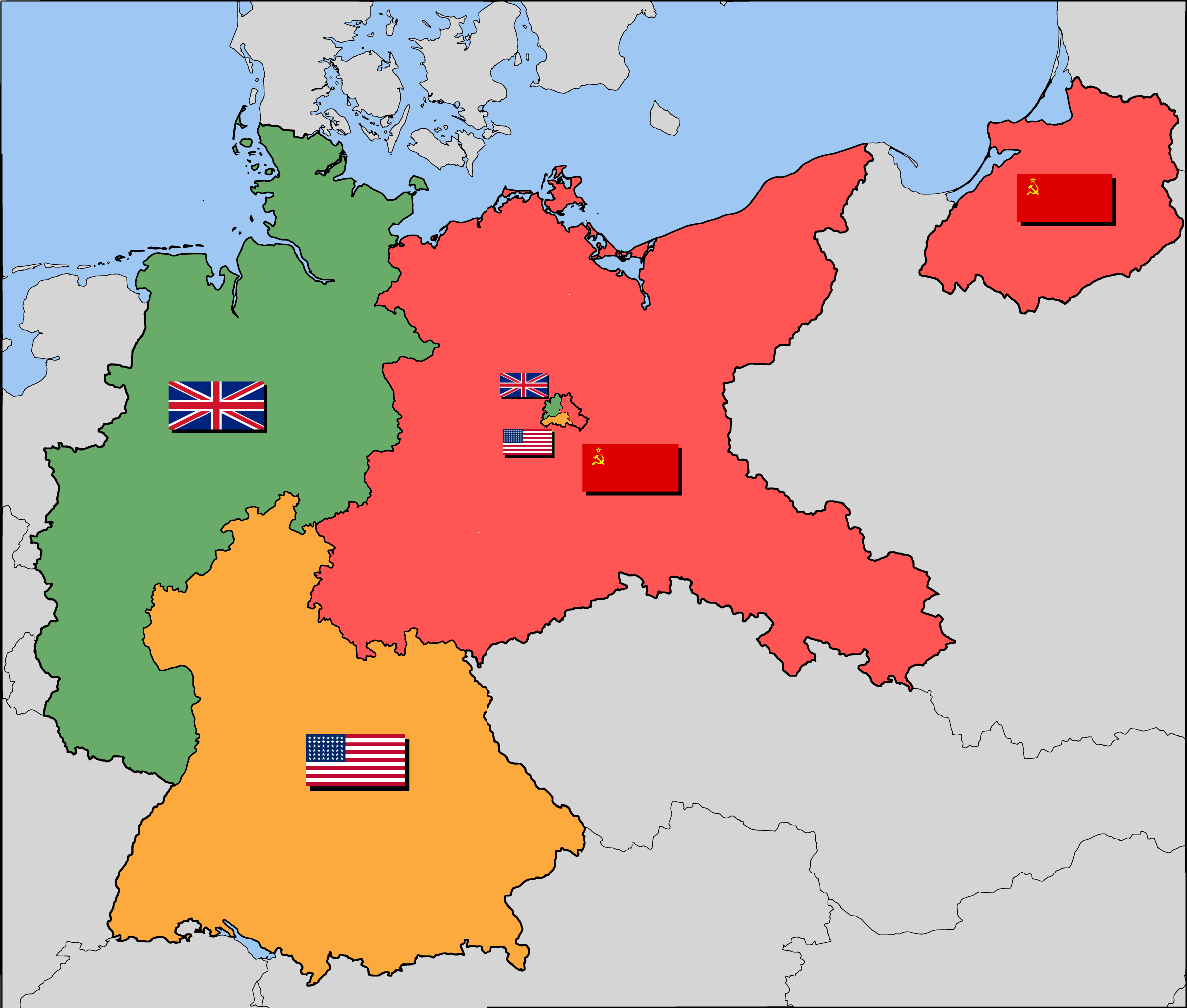
Originally planned occupation zones according to the London Protocol (1944)

States (Länder) of the Soviet zone and later also the GDR until 1952: Mecklenburg Brandenburg Saxony-Anhalt Saxony Thuringia

== Dissolution of Prussia ==
In 1945, the Soviet occupation zone consisted primarily of the central portions of Prussia. After Prussia was dissolved by the Allied powers in 1947, the area was divided between the German states (Länder) of Brandenburg, Mecklenburg, Saxony, Saxony-Anhalt and Thuringia. On 7 October 1949, the Soviet zone was formally abolished with the proclamation of the German Democratic Republic. In 1952, the Länder were dissolved and realigned into 14 districts (Bezirke), plus the district of East Berlin.

== Soviet proposal for a united Germany and disinterest by the Western Allies ==
In 1952, with the Cold War political confrontation well underway, Joseph Stalin sounded out the Western Powers about the prospect of a united Germany which would be non-aligned (the "Stalin Note"). The West's lack of interest in this proposal helped to cement the Soviet Zone's identity as the GDR for the next four decades.

== Terminology for the area used in West Germany ==
"Soviet zone" and derivatives (or also, "the so-called GDR") remained official and common names for East Germany in West Germany, which refused to acknowledge the existence of a state in East Germany until 1972, when the government of Willy Brandt extended a qualified recognition under its Ostpolitik initiative.

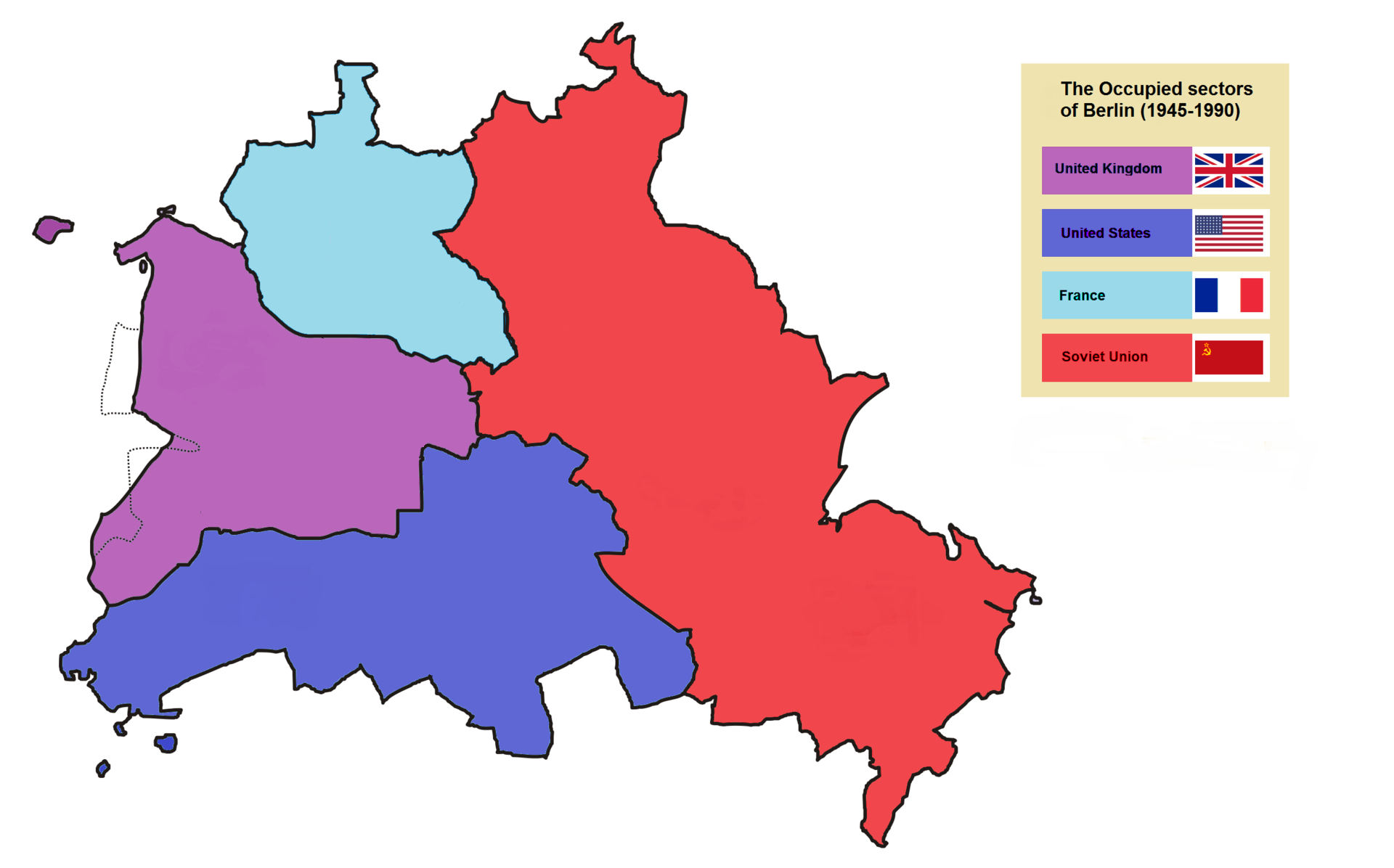
The occupied sectors of Berlin

== See also ==
- Allied-occupied Austria
- History of East Germany
- Bizone
- Trizone
- Group of Soviet Forces in Germany
- Stunde Null
