= President of East Germany =

Head of state from 1949 to 1960

President of the German Democratic Republic
- Präsident der Deutschen Demokratischen Republik
- Standard of the president (1955–1960)

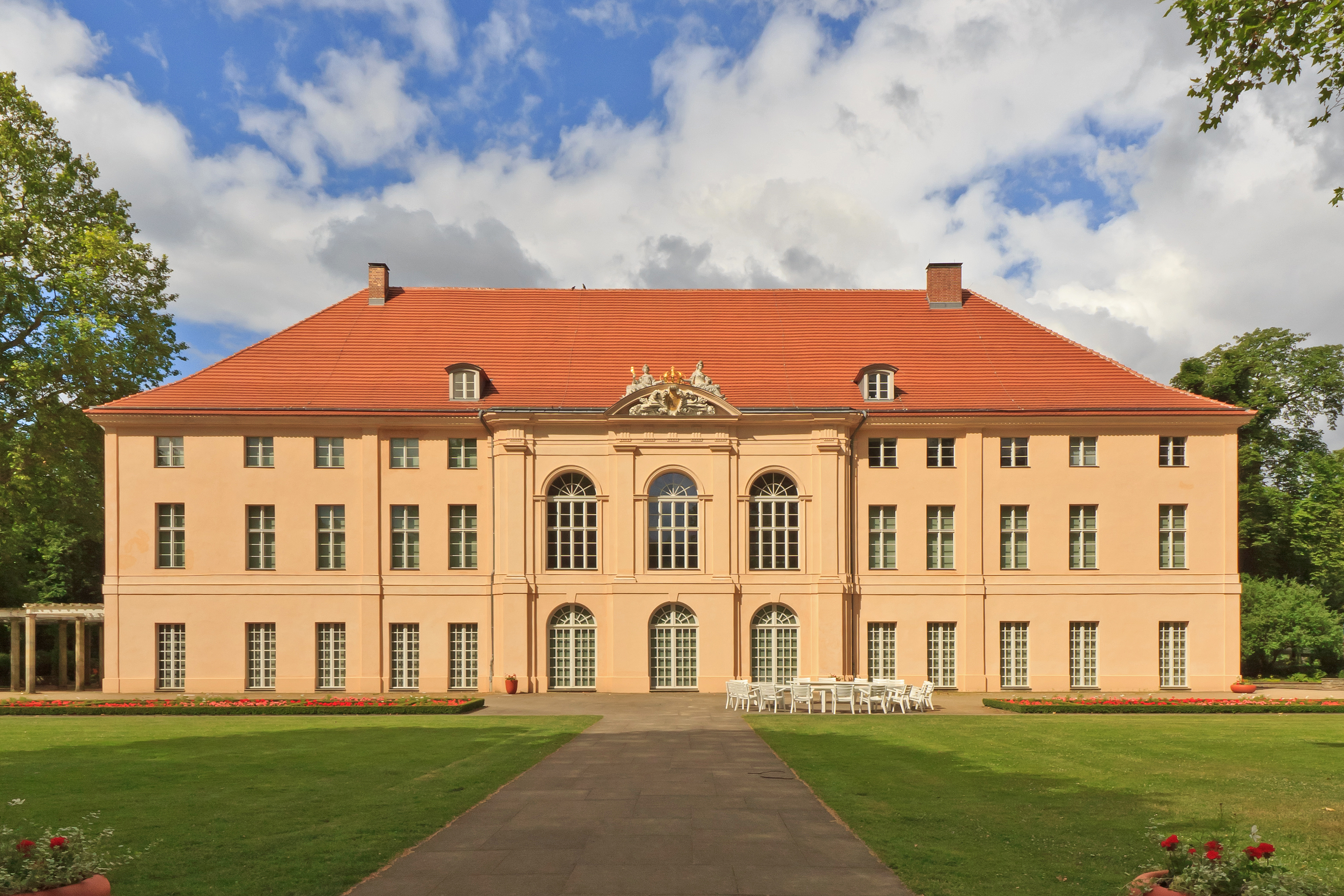
- Schönhausen Palace at Niederschönhausen in Pankow, Berlin.
- Residence: Majakowskiring 29, Pankow, East Berlin
- Seat: Schönhausen Palace, Pankow, East Berlin
- Appointer: People's Chamber; Chamber of States
- Precursor: Reichspräsident
- Formation: 11 October 1949
- First holder: Wilhelm Pieck
- Final holder: Wilhelm Pieck
- Abolished: 7 September 1960
- Superseded by: State Council of East Germany
- Deputy: President of the People's Chamber

The president of the German Democratic Republic (German: Präsident der Deutschen Demokratischen Republik) was the head of state of the German Democratic Republic, commonly known as East Germany, from 1949 until 1960. The office was created by the Constitution of 1949 (Section V) with the President of the Republic was elected by the People's Chamber (Volkskammer) and the Chamber of States (Länderkammer). The office was mostly ceremonial in nature and, if necessary, the president of the People's Chamber acted as the president of the state.

Wilhelm Pieck of the Socialist Unity Party of Germany (SED) was the sole incumbent as President of the German Democratic Republic, elected on 11 October 1949 shortly after the Foundation of East Germany and re-elected in 1953 and in 1957. On 7 September 1960, shortly after the death of Pieck, the Constitution was amended which abolished the office of president. The Law concerning the formation of the State Council of 12 September 1960 introduced the State Council of East Germany, a collective head of state, instead of the presidency. The State Council was abolished during the Die Wende in 1989 and 1990, with President of the People's Chamber Sabine Bergmann-Pohl acted as interim head of state.

== Election ==
The president of the Republic was elected for a term of four years by a joint session of the Volkskammer and the Länderkammer, which was convened and presided over by the President of the Volkskammer. Any citizen who was at least thirty-five years old was eligible for the post.

The administrative reform of 1952 led to the dissolution of the states (Länder) of East Germany. The Landerkammer thereby became meaningless; it met in 1954 for the last time and was formally abolished in 1958. As a result, the Volkskammer alone was responsible for the election of the president.

== Oath of office ==
On assuming office, the president of the Republic took the following oath before a joint session of the Volkskammer and the Landerkammer:

I swear that I will dedicate my strength to the welfare of the German people, that I will defend the Constitution and the laws of the Republic, that I will discharge my duties conscientiously and do justice to all.

== Impeachment ==
The president of the Republic might be recalled before the expiration of his term by a joint resolution of the Volkskammer and the Landerkammer. Such a resolution required a two-thirds majority of the statutory number of representatives.

== Duties and competences ==
Largely a ceremonial position (similarly to the president of West Germany), the duties and competences of the president of the Republic as stipulated in articles 104–108 of the Constitution of 1949:

- Promulgating the laws of the Republic.
- Receiving the oath of office from members of the Council of Ministers upon their assumption of duties.
- Representing the Republic in international relations.
- Concluding and signing treaties with foreign countries on behalf of the Republic.
- Accrediting and receiving ambassadors and ministers.

To become effective, all orders and decrees issued by the president of the Republic needed to be countersigned by the chairman of the Council of Ministers or the competent Minister.

The president exercised the right of pardon on behalf of the Republic. In this function he was advised by a committee of the Volkskammer.

== Incapacitation and vacancy ==
Whenever the president of the Republic was unable to attend to his office, he was represented by the president of the Volkskammer. If such incapacity is expected to continue for a protracted period, a substitute was to be appointed by (a specific) law.

Whenever the presidency was terminated prematurely, the same rule applied until the election of a new president.

President Pieck was already 73 years old when he won his first term in 1949. Although he served as co-chairman of the SED alongside Prime Minister Otto Grotewohl from 1949 to 1950, he never played a major role in the party. Most of the power was held by Walter Ulbricht, First Secretary of the party from 1950. This changed after the abolition of the presidential office, since the leader of the SED was usually also head of state.

== Abolition ==
After Wilhelm Pieck had died in 1960, the presidency was abolished in favor of a collective body, the State Council. The State Council was elected in the same way as the president, by the Volkskammer, and initially exercised the powers of the presidency. In reality, the State Council was effectively represented by its chairman, and it was reduced to a ceremonial body by 1974, with its chairman deriving real power from leadership of the SED.

With the Constitution of 1968, the last references to the presidency were eliminated.

After the Peaceful Revolution, there were plans to reintroduce the office of the president of the Republic by constitutional law from 1990 onward, which did not happen in the course of German reunification.

== Presidential standards ==
1949–1950

1950–1951

1951–1953

1953–1955

1955–1960

== Gallery ==
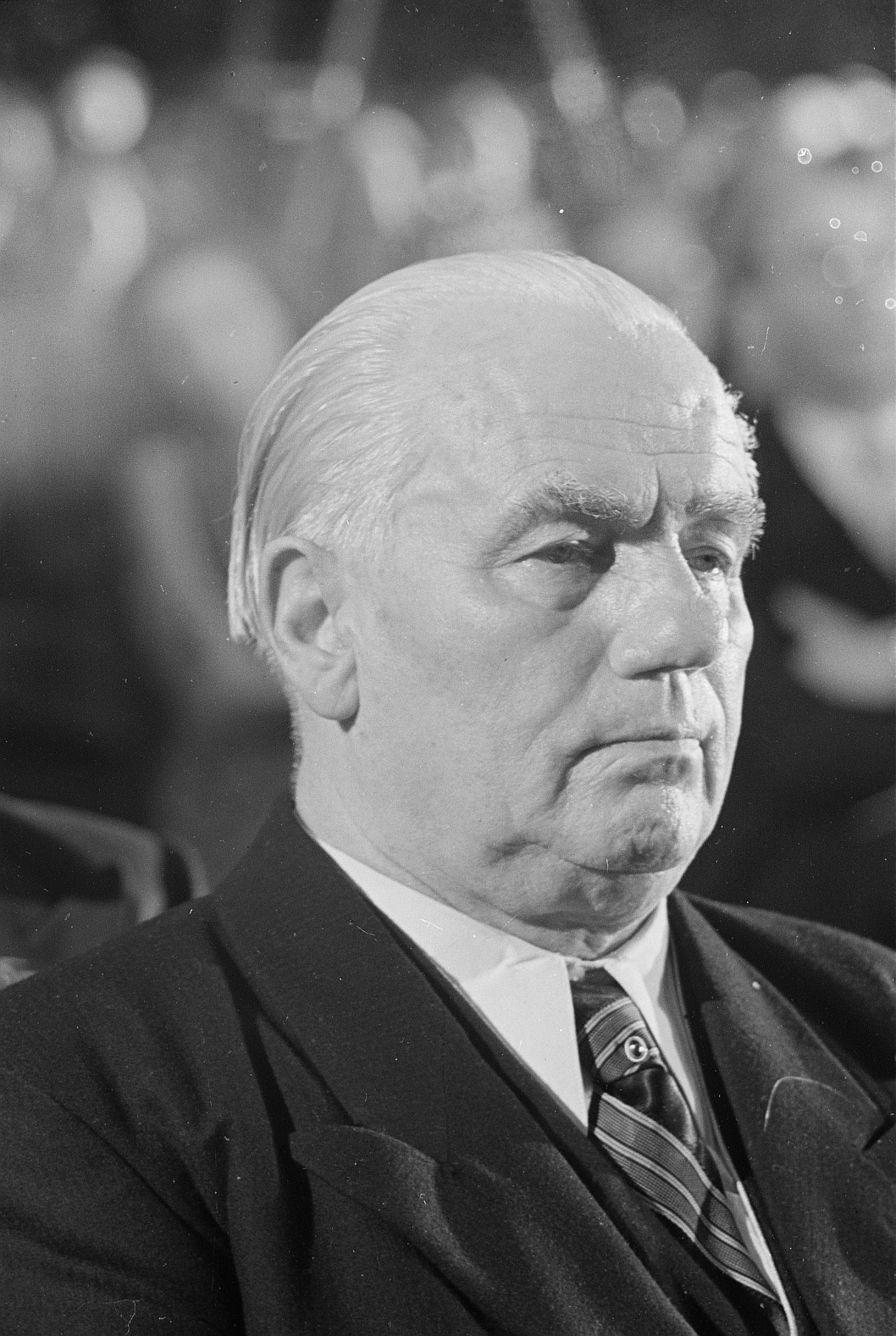
Wilhelm Pieck, 1950.

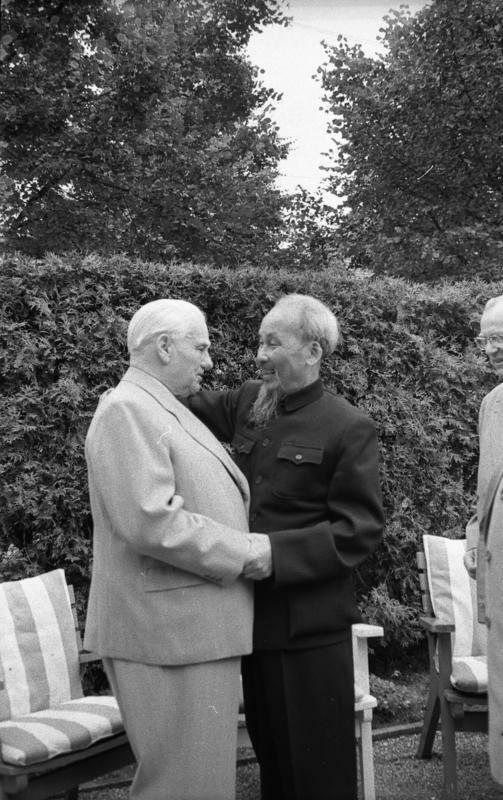
Pieck receiving Ho Chi Minh, President of North Vietnam (Democratic Republic of Vietnam), 1957.

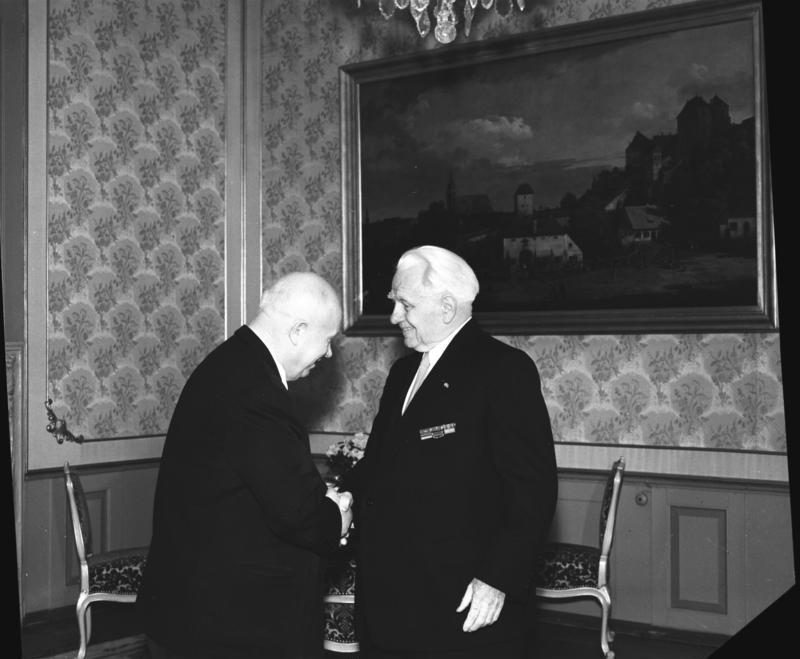
Pieck receiving Nikita Khrushchev, Premier of the Soviet Union, 1959.

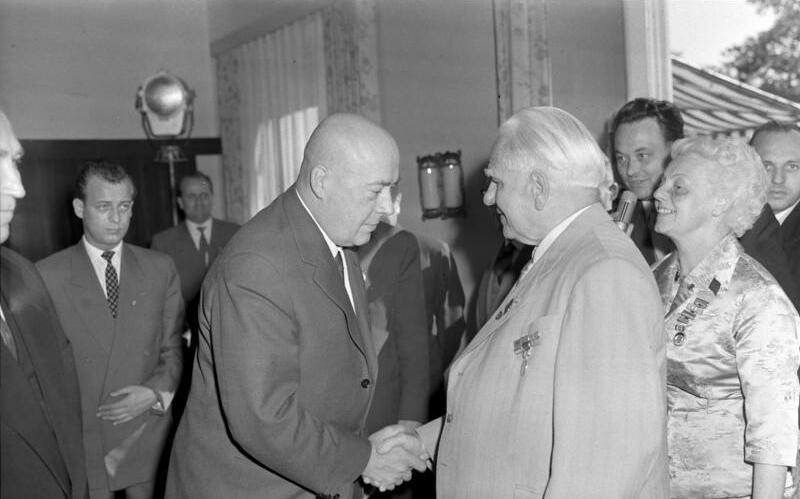
Pieck receiving Józef Cyrankiewicz, Prime Minister of the Polish People's Republic, 1959.

== See also ==
- President of Germany (1919–1945)
- President of Germany
