= Otto Grotewohl =

German politician (1894–1964)

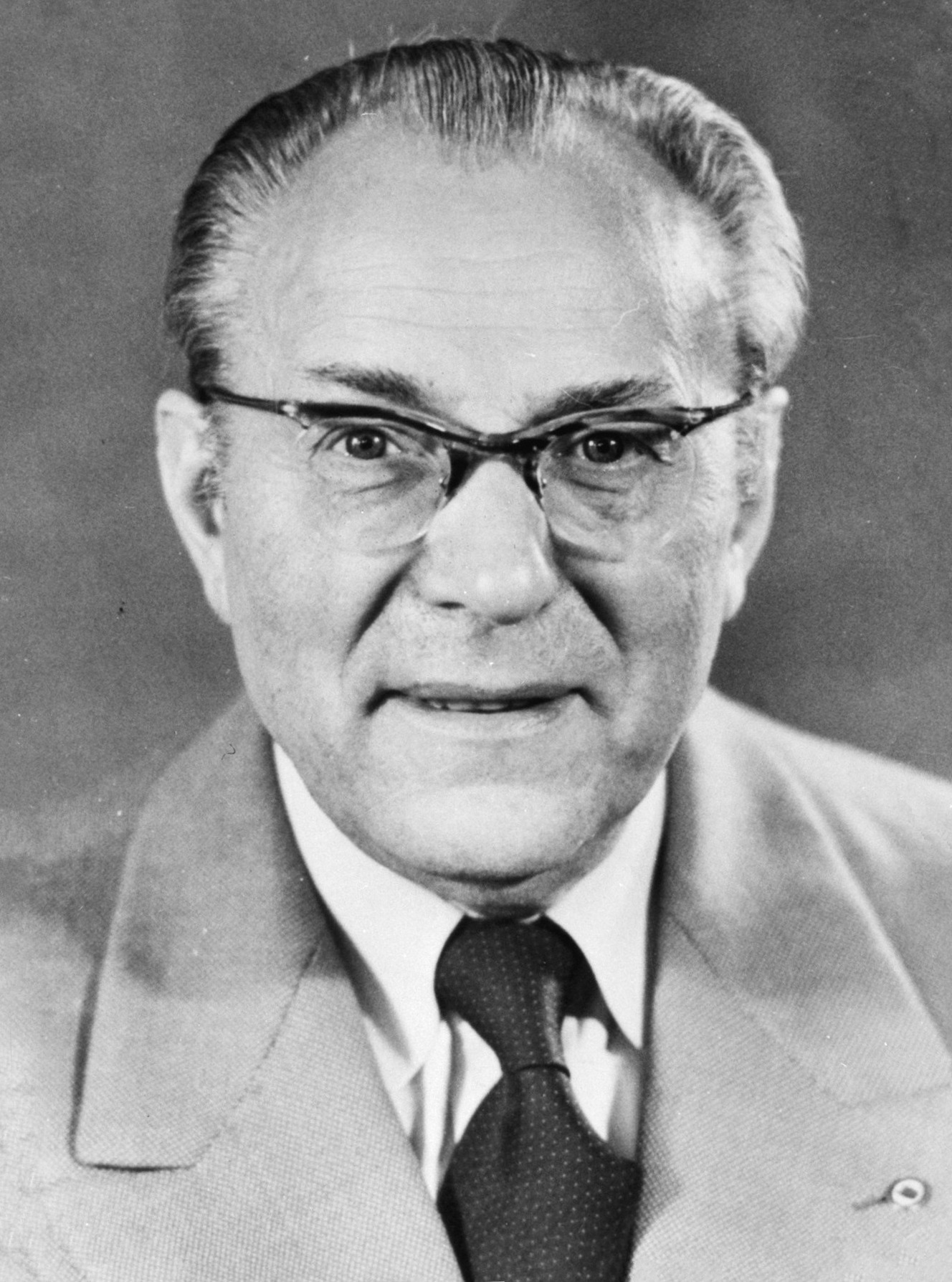
- Grotewohl in 1964

Chairman of the Council of Ministers (Note: Titled "Minister-President" until 8 December 1958.)
- In office 7 October 1949 – 21 September 1964 (Note: Though de jure in office until his death, Willi Stoph was acting Chairman since November 1960 because of Grotewohl's declining health due to leukemia.)
- First Deputy: Walter Ulbricht; Willi Stoph
- Preceded by: Position established
- Succeeded by: Willi Stoph

Chairman of the Socialist Unity Party
- In office 22 April 1946 – 25 July 1950 Serving with Wilhelm Pieck
- Deputy: Walter Ulbricht; Max Fechner
- Preceded by: Himself (as Co-Chairman of the Central Committee of the SPD)
- Succeeded by: Walter Ulbricht (as General Secretary)

Chairman of the Central Committee of the SPD
- In office 15 June 1945 – 22 April 1946 Serving with Erich Gniffke, Max Fechner
- Preceded by: Hans Vogel (as Chairman of the Sopade)
- Succeeded by: Himself (as Co-Chairman of the Socialist Unity Party)
Free State of Brunswick Government
Minister of Justice
In office 13 February 1923 – 24 December 1924
Minister-President	Heinrich Jasper
Preceded by	Ewald Vogtherr
Succeeded by	Johannes Lieff
In office 28 March 1922 – 23 May 1922
Minister-President	Otto Antrick
Preceded by	August Junke
Succeeded by	Heinrich Jasper (acting)
Minister of Public Education
In office 25 November 1920 – 23 May 1922
Minister-President	Sepp Oerter; August Junke; Otto Antrick
Preceded by	Sepp Oerter (acting)
Succeeded by	Rudolf Kaefer
Parliamentary constituencies
Member of the Volkskammer for Berlin
In office 18 March 1948 – 21 September 1964
Preceded by	Constituency established
Succeeded by	Eberhard Alff (1965)
Member of the Reichstag for South Hanover–Braunschweig
In office 31 October 1925 – 22 June 1933
Preceded by	Elise Bartels
Succeeded by	Constituency abolished
Member of the Landtag of the Free State of Brunswick
In office 22 June 1920 – 31 October 1925
Preceded by	Multi-member district
Succeeded by	Robert Oppermann

Personal details
- Born: Otto Emil Franz Grotewohl; 11 March 1894 Braunschweig, Duchy of Braunschweig, German Empire (now Lower Saxony, Germany)
- Died: 21 September 1964 (aged 70) East Berlin, East Germany
- Party: SPD (1912–1918, 1922–1946); USPD (1918–1922); SED (1946–1964)
- Spouse: Marie Martha Louise
- Children: 2
- Occupation: Politician; Printer

Military service
- Allegiance: German Empire
- Branch/service: Imperial German Army
- Years of service: 1914–1918
- Unit: 137th Infantry Regiment
- Battles/wars: World War I; Western Front (WIA)
- Central institution membership: 1949–1964: Full member, Politburo of the Central Committee; 1946–1964: Full member, Central Committee (Note: Party Executive Committee until 1950); Other offices held: 1960–1964: Deputy Chairman, State Council; 1960–1964: Member, State Council; 1960–1964: Member, National Defence Council; 1918–1919: Chairman, German-Dutch Border Workers' and Soldiers' Council

Otto Emil Franz Grotewohl (German pronunciation: [ˈɔtoː ˈɡʁoːtəvoːl]; 11 March 1894 – 21 September 1964) was a German politician who served as the first prime minister (Chairman of the Council of ministers) of the German Democratic Republic (East Germany) from its founding in October 1949 until his death in September 1964.

Grotewohl was a Social Democratic Party (SPD) politician in the Free State of Brunswick during the Weimar Republic and leader of the party branch in the Soviet Occupation Zone after World War II. Grotewohl led the SPD's merger with the Communist Party (KPD) to form the Socialist Unity Party of Germany (SED) in 1946 and served as co-chairman of the party with KPD leader Wilhelm Pieck until 1950. Grotewohl chaired the Council of Ministers after the formal establishment of the GDR in 1949 and served as the de jure head of government under First Secretary Walter Ulbricht until his death in 1964.

== Biography ==
=== Early years ===
Grotewohl was born on 11 March 1894 in Braunschweig to a middle-class Protestant family, the son of a master tailor, and was apprenticed to a printer. At the age of 16 he joined the youth wing of the Social Democratic Party of Germany. Grotewohl served in the 137th Infantry Regiment of the German Army during World War I (in which he was wounded several times), and served as chairman of the workers' and soldiers' council of the troops on the German-Dutch border from 1918 to 1919. He started his political career after the war as a leader of the Independent Social Democratic Party of Germany (USPD), and in 1920 was elected to the Landtag of the Free State of Brunswick in the Weimar Republic. Grotewohl served as a minister in numerous cabinets of the Brunswick state government, including Minister of Justice and Education from March to May 1922, and Minister of Justice from February 1923.

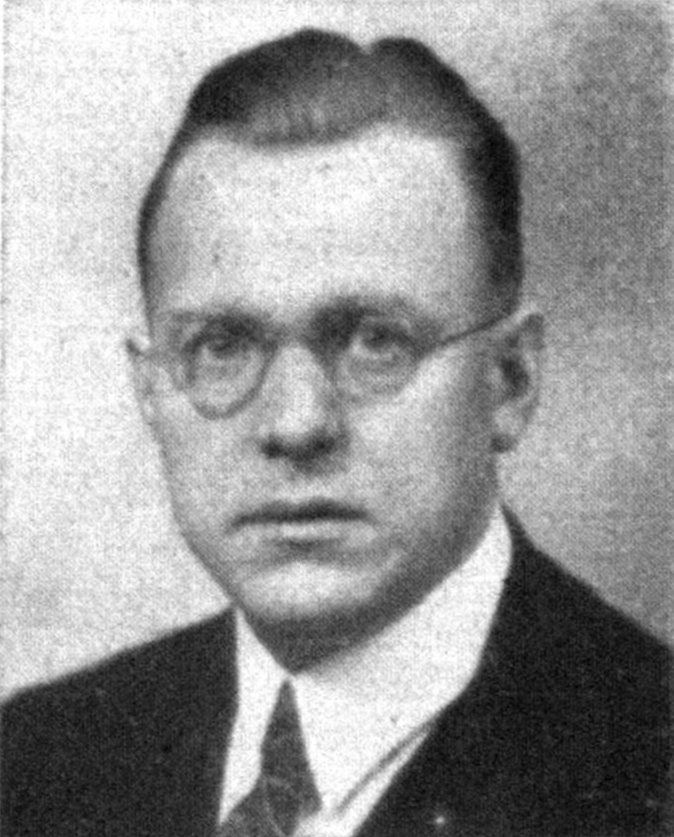
Grotewohl's official Reichstag portrait, 1930

In 1922, Grotewohl and the majority of the USPD members joined the Social Democratic Party, and on 31 October 1925 he became a member of parliament in the national Reichstag to replace the SPD representative Elise Bartels after her death. Grotewohl was elected to the Reichstag in his own right in the September 1930 election and re-elected in the July 1932, November 1932, and March 1933 elections.

=== Nazi era ===
Grotewohl was eventually dismissed as a representative in the Reichstag after the Machtergreifung, the establishment of Nazi Germany, and like other SPD members was subject to discrimination. On 23 March 1933, Grotewohl had voted against Chancellor Adolf Hitler's Enabling Act, a constitutional amendment allowing Hitler to enact laws without the Reichstag's approval, which passed. Grotewohl was brutally beaten, arrested and imprisoned several times by Nazi police and subsequently forced to leave Braunschweig, first moving to Hamburg then from 1938 to Berlin, where he worked as a greengrocer and industrial representative. Grotewohl joined a resistance group centered around Erich Gniffke, an SPD politician he knew from Braunschweig, but the group ended up ensuring the contact and economic survival of its members rather than resisting Nazi rule. In August 1938, Grotewohl was again brutally beaten, arrested and charged by Nazi police with treason before the People's Court. On 4 March 1939, Grotewohl was released from pre-trial detention and the court's procedure against him was discontinued after seven months. Grotewohl was again brutally beaten and arrested by Nazi police after Georg Elser's attempted assassination of Adolf Hitler and other high-ranking Nazis on 8 November 1939, spending about eight weeks in custody before being released. Grotewohl worked as a clerk in Berlin after his release and increasingly devoted his time to painting. Grotewohl had been scheduled for arrest again on 20 July 1944, but the Gestapo was unable to locate him because he was now living off-the-grid. According to Heinz Voßke's 1979 biography of Grotewohl, this lifestyle allowed him to avoid being conscripted into the Volkssturm during the closing months of World War II.

=== Formation of the Socialist Unity Party ===
After German defeat in World War II in May 1945, the country was occupied by the Allied forces and divided into four zones governed by the United States, the Soviet Union, the United Kingdom, and France, respectively. Grotewohl and several other former SPD politicians founded a branch of the re-established Social Democratic Party of Germany in the Soviet Occupation Zone, and he became the branch leader as Chairman of the Central Committee. Immediately after the war, the Soviets believed the Communist Party of Germany (KPD), rebuilt by the "Ulbricht Group" and led by Wilhelm Pieck, would naturally develop into the strongest political force in their zone with some guidance. However, Soviet leader Joseph Stalin and KPD deputy leader Walter Ulbricht began to push for a merger with the eastern SPD after the poor performance of communist parties in elections in Hungary and Austria in November 1945. The SPD in the Soviet zone faced increasing pressure from the Soviet Military Administration (SVAG) to merge with the KPD, despite historic animosity between the two parties. Unification was pushed by some members of Grotewohl's SPD in the Soviet zone and Berlin, under the belief that division between the main left-wing parties had led to Nazi rise to power. Grotewohl initially opposed the merger, but under duress from Ulbricht and SVAG soon yielded and became a proponent of a quick unification. Grotewohl's change of heart was fiercely opposed by Kurt Schumacher, a prominent member of the eastern SPD and anti-communist, who subsequently became leader of the western SPD after the merger.

In April 1946, the KPD and the eastern branch of the SPD merged as the Socialist Unity Party (SED), with Pieck and Grotewohl serving as co-chairmen. Grotewohl's hand appeared alongside Pieck's on the SED's "handshake" logo derived from the SPD-KPD congress establishing the party where he symbolically shook hands with Pieck. Grotewohl's position allowed him to avoid the systematic sidelining and exclusion of former SPD members that began soon after the merger. The few recalcitrant SPD supporters were condemned as "Agents of Schumacher" and shunted aside, accelerating a process that left the SED as essentially the KPD under a new name. Eventually, Grotewohl was one of the few holdovers from the SPD half of the merger to have a prominent post in the merged party.

In 1948, Grotewohl became Chairman of the constitutional committee of the German People's Council, the predecessor of the Volkskammer.

=== Prime minister ===
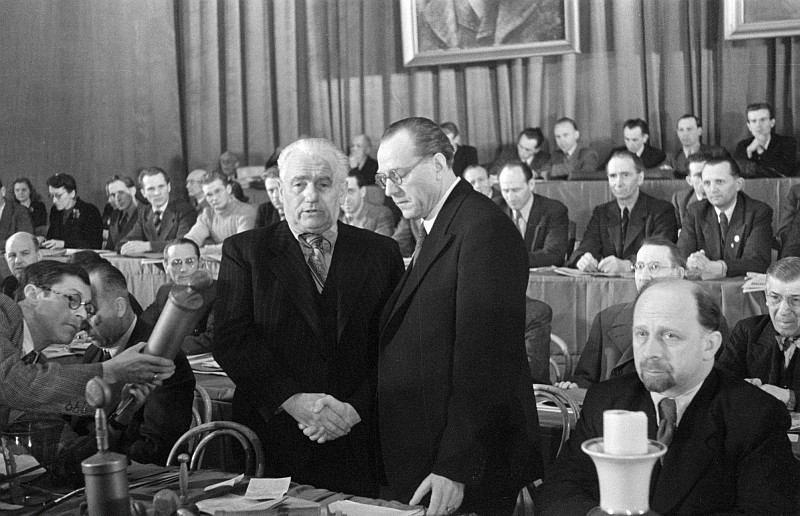
21 April 1946: Grotewohl (right) and Wilhelm Pieck (left) sealing the unification of the SPD and KPD with a symbolic handshake. Walter Ulbricht in the foreground to the right of Grotewohl.

On 12 October 1949, a few days after the formal proclamation of the new country, Grotewohl became the first prime minister (Ministerpräsident) of the German Democratic Republic (commonly known as East Germany or the GDR), five days after its establishment from the Soviet Occupation Zone with the SED as the ruling party. Grotewohl was appointed Chairman of the Council of Ministers (Ministerrat), the de jure government of the GDR, while Pieck served as State President. Although Grotewohl and Pieck were officially on equal footing, Grotewohl wielded far more real political power in state affairs than Pieck. In the East German political hierarchy, the prime minister was the highest state official, with the president nominally ranking second. Thus, for the GDR's first year of existence, Grotewohl was the most powerful politician in the country.

Grotewohl's power was significantly reduced in July 1950, when the SED restructured along more orthodox Soviet lines. Ulbricht became First Secretary of the SED's Central Committee, the de facto power center of the GDR, and thus the de facto leader of East Germany. Grotewohl remained as Chairman of the Council of Ministers and the official head of government without challenge from the SED. However, the Council of Ministers, despite being officially defined as the "government" of East Germany, was reduced to a transmission belt for policies made by the SED's Politburo. Grotewohl was thus left as mostly a figurehead without any real influence on state affairs. Grotewohl was a member of the delegation that signed the Treaty of Zgorzelec on the recognition of the Oder-Neisse border as a border between the GDR and the People's Republic of Poland. In 1957, Grotewohl advocated for the Rapacki Plan for a nuclear weapon-free zone in Central Europe.

Unlike Ulbricht and most of his other SED colleagues, Grotewohl was known to openly favour a more humane way of governing. He condemned abuses in the legal system in a major speech at the SED party conference on 28 March 1956. He also denounced illegal arrests, called for more respect for civil rights, and even called for lively debate in the Volkskammer. Grotewohl also made a veiled criticism of Justice Minister Hilde Benjamin's notoriously high-handed handling of political trials. Despite his open criticism of the SED's increasingly heavy-handed rule, Grotewohl retained his posts without reprisal because the Kremlin maintained its trust in him.

=== Last years and death ===
Grotewohl, who was 55 years old upon coming to power, faced rapidly declining health during his premiership. Grotewohl was repeatedly taken to a government hospital during the 1950s, typically minor examinations in which he was released on the same day, but also multi-day stays. However, Grotewohl was not only examined by specialist physicians in the GDR, who identified arteriosclerosis and incipient calcification of the coronary system in his heart in 1953, but also took advantage of the medical care of top Soviet politicians in Moscow. On 12 November 1953, Grotewohl visited the Kremlin Polyclinic in Moscow. Afterwards, Grotewohl completed a three-and-a-half-week cure on the Black Sea. He reportedly took advantage of these unofficial stays in Moscow to conduct political talks with the Kremlin, but there are no official records. From 1955, Grotewohl's doctors were worried about the condition of his cardiovascular system. In 1959, they finally diagnosed incipient heart failure and pushed for a reduction in workload. Due to the persistent high blood pressure and the chronic arrhythmia, the physicians feared a heart attack.

In 1960, Grotewohl was diagnosed with leukemia, and the course of the year saw his health deteriorate rapidly to the point he was barely able to participate in daily political business. On 4 April 1960, Grotewohl traveled to a four-week relaxing holiday on the Black Sea; eight months later, he arrived again for several weeks in the Soviet sanatorium in Barvikha. After his return from the Soviet Union, he reluctantly moved with his wife from Pankow to Wandlitz, giving in to a previous decision from Ulbricht. At the end of October 1960, Grotewohl had commissioned his top deputy, Willi Stoph, as acting prime minister, although he officially remained in office. The permanent cardiovascular disorders prevented Grotewohl's return to politics, and he was no longer able to participate actively in the meetings of the leadership committees of the party and the government. As his eyesight also faded, he could no longer read any script, which is why there are hardly any public speeches from him at the beginning of 1961. Despite the clear medical situation, his resignation was out of the question. On the contrary, in September 1960 Grotewohl became Deputy Chairman of the State Council, the collective body that was created on the base of the Presidency which was abolished after Wilhelm Pieck's death in 1960.

Grotewohl died on 21 September 1964, at 12:35 noon, in the Niederschönhausen area of Pankow, East Berlin, from the complications of a brain haemorrhage. A few hours later, the GDR flag on the Brandenburg Gate was lowered half-mast and the Deutscher Fernsehfunk broadcasting was interrupted. The GDR Council of Ministers ordered 3-day mourning period and Grotewohl was lying in state in the SED Headquarters. On 15 October, his ashes were buried at the Memorial to the Socialists (German: Gedenkstätte der Sozialisten) in the Friedrichsfelde Central Cemetery, Berlin.

== Legacy ==
After his death, the Wilhelmstrasse in East Berlin was renamed Otto-Grotewohl-Straße in his honor; the street officially retained this name until 1993, not long after the German reunification. On 15 April 1986, the present-day Mohrenstraße U-Bahn station in eastern Berlin, then known as the Thälmannplatz station, was also renamed Otto-Grotewohl-Straße. The Third German School in Chapayesky Lane, Moscow, was named the Otto Grotewohl School.

== Personal life ==
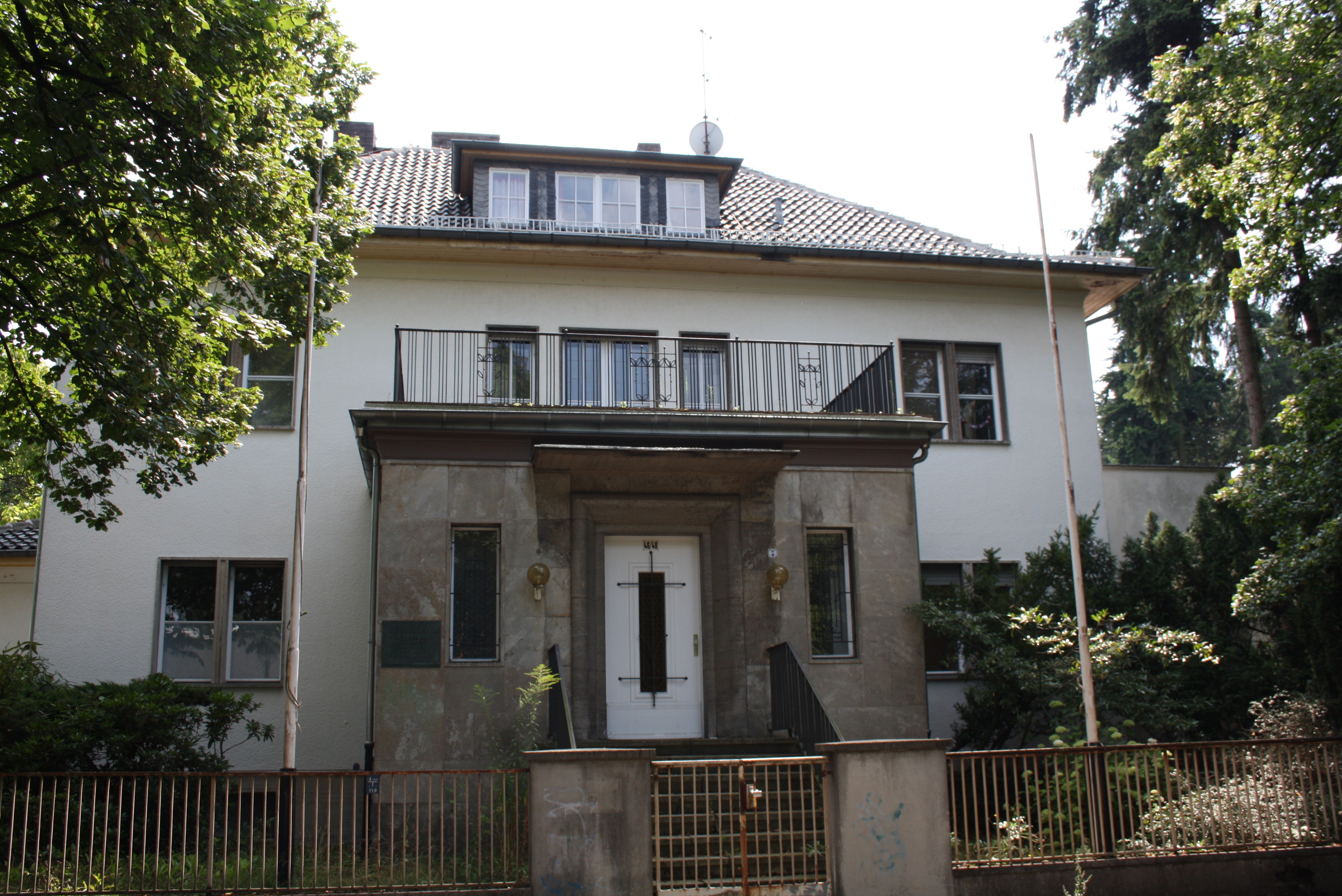
Grotewohl's house in 46 Majakowskiring in Berlin

Grotewohl was married to Marie Martha Louise (née Ohst) from 1919 until 1949. The couple had two children, a son Hans and daughter Dorle. Hans Grotewohl (1924–1999), was an architect who was sent by his father to lead a German Work Team for rebuilding Hamhung, North Korea, in 1954 after the Korean War. Grotewohl married his secretary, Johanna Schumann (née Danielzig) the same year as his divorce from Ohst.

He was an avid painter and amateur filmmaker.

== Notes ==
Political offices
Preceded by Count Lutz Schwerin von Krosigk as Leading Minister of the German Reich	Chairman of the Council of Ministers of the GDR; 1949–1964	Succeeded by Willi Stoph
Party political offices
Preceded by Post created	Chairman of the Socialist Unity Party of Germany (with Wilhelm Pieck); 1946–1950	Succeeded by Walter Ulbricht (as First Secretary)
