= Herbert Kroker =

German politician (1929–2022)

Chairman of the Working Committee of the SED
- In office 3 December 1989 – 6 December 1989
- Deputy: Heinz Albrecht; Dieter Klein; Eva Maleck-Lewy
- Preceded by: Egon Krenz (as General Secretary of the SED)
- Succeeded by: Gregor Gysi (as Chairman of the SED)

First Secretary of the Socialist Unity Party in Bezirk Erfurt
- In office 11 November 1989 – December 1989
- Second Secretary: Siegfried Stange
- Preceded by: Gerhard Müller
- Succeeded by: Position abolished
Volkskammer
Member of the Volkskammer for Erfurt-Land, Langensalza, Sömmerda
In office 25 June 1981 – 16 June 1986
Preceded by	Wolfgang Lungershausen
Succeeded by	Hans-Joachim Riebow

Personal details
- Born: Herbert Kroker; 24 August 1929 Groß Merzdorf, Lower Silesia, Weimar Republic
- Died: 14 April 2022 (aged 92) Erfurt, Thuringia, Germany
- Party: Socialist Unity Party (1954–1989)
- Other political affiliations: Party of Democratic Socialism
- Education: Hochschule für Ökonomie Berlin (Dipl.-Ök.); "Karl Marx" Party Academy (Dr. rer. oec.)
- Occupation: Politician; Party Functionary; Machinist
- Awards: Patriotic Order of Merit, 3rd class; Banner of Labor; Star of Peoples' Friendship

Herbert Kroker (24 August 1929 – 14 April 2022) was an East German combine director, politician and party functionary of the Socialist Unity Party (SED).

Originally a trade union functionary, Kroker later served as director of several state-owned enterprises, culminating in his 1970 appointment to lead the large industrial combine VEB Kombinat Umformtechnik "Herbert Warnke" Erfurt. He was replaced and demoted in 1983 due to disagreements with the SED's leadership.

During the Peaceful Revolution, he rose to become the last first secretary of the Bezirk Erfurt SED and, briefly in December 1989, led the SED itself during its restructuring.

== Life and career ==
=== Early career ===
Herbert Kroker was born on 24 August 1929 in Groß Merzdorf, Province of Lower Silesia, Prussia, Weimar Republic (now Gmina Marcinowice, Poland). Kroker, the son of a working-class family, began an apprenticeship in commercial work after completing primary school. In 1945, he was drafted into the Volkssturm and became a Soviet prisoner of war, where he remained for four months.

After World War II, he initially worked as a farm laborer on a Polish state estate and then completed an apprenticeship as a metalworker from 1946 to 1949. Until 1953, he worked in this profession at the "G. Kohl" factory in Chemnitz and as an assembler at VEB Lufttechnische Anlagen Berlin. In 1953, he joined the Free German Trade Union Federation (FDGB) and, in 1954, the ruling Socialist Unity Party of Germany (SED).

From 1953 to 1955, he worked as a skilled worker and was chairman of the factory trade union leadership (BGL) at VEB Starkstromanlagenbau Karl-Marx-Stadt. After taking a one-year course at the Central School of the IG Metall, he was made the BGL chairman at VEB Industriewerke Karl-Marx-Stadt, serving from 1958 to 1961.

In 1961, he was made chairman of the Bezirk Karl-Marx-Stadt IG Metall. He continued to serve as a full-time FDGB functionary as organizer of the FDGB federal board at VVB Werkzeugmaschinen Karl-Marx-Stadt from 1963. The next year, Kroker was promoted to be the organizer of the SED Central Committee there, joining the SED's apparatus.

=== Combine director ===
From 1967 to 1968, Kroker completed a distance learning course at the Berlin School of Economics, graduating with a diploma in economics (Dipl.-Ök.). After a stint as director of the VEB Pressen- und Scherenbau Erfurt from 1969 to 1970, he was made general director of the newly-formed VEB Kombinat Umformtechnik "Herbert Warnke" Erfurt. The combine bundled 25 plants in 19 companies in 16 cities together, the main factory in Erfurt alone having 5.500 employees.

The combine was a leading manufacturer and exporter of production lines and machines for metal forming and plastics processing, 90% of the combine's products were exported, including 80% to the USSR and the other Eastern Bloc countries.

In 1979, while serving as combine director, he additionally earned a doctorate in economics (Dr. rer. oec.) from the SED's "Karl Marx" Party Academy. In addition to his role as general director, Kroker was a member of the Erfurt city SED leadership from 1979 and the Bezirk Erfurt SED leadership from 1981. He was also made a member of the Volkskammer that year, nominally representing Erfurt's suburbs.

=== Dismissal ===
Kroker eventually found himself at odds with the SED's leadership. Ahead of Erich Honecker's May 1981 Japan state visit, Kroker objected to the decision of SED Central Committee secretary for economics Günter Mittag to import 10,000 Mazda cars as a gesture of goodwill, arguing that it would be better to import another 10,000 VW Golf instead. He argued that there was a very beneficial collaboration with the Volkswagen Group in many areas, which could be further developed.

He was transferred to Apolda as the director of the VEB Feuerlöschgerätewerk in 1982 and eventually replaced as general director in 1983. He later worked from 1986 as the director of the VEB Weimar-Werk for agricultural machinery. Kroker additionally had to leave the Bezirk Erfurt SED leadership and the Volkskammer in 1986.

=== Peaceful Revolution ===
During the Peaceful Revolution, on 11 November 1989, Kroker was elected to succeed deposed Gerhard Müller as First Secretary of the Bezirk Erfurt SED.

After the collective resignation of the Politburo and the Central Committee on 3 December 1989, he also led the temporary working committee of the SED (German: Arbeitsausschuß zur Vorbereitung des außerordentlichen Parteitages) until the party congress on December 6, making him the de jure leader of the SED for several days. in this role, he prepared the party's transition into democracy, but he also faced criticism that he lacked democratic legitimacy.

Kroker remained a member of the Party of Democratic Socialism (PDS), the SED's successor.
