= Gerhard Müller (politician) =

German politician (1928–2020)

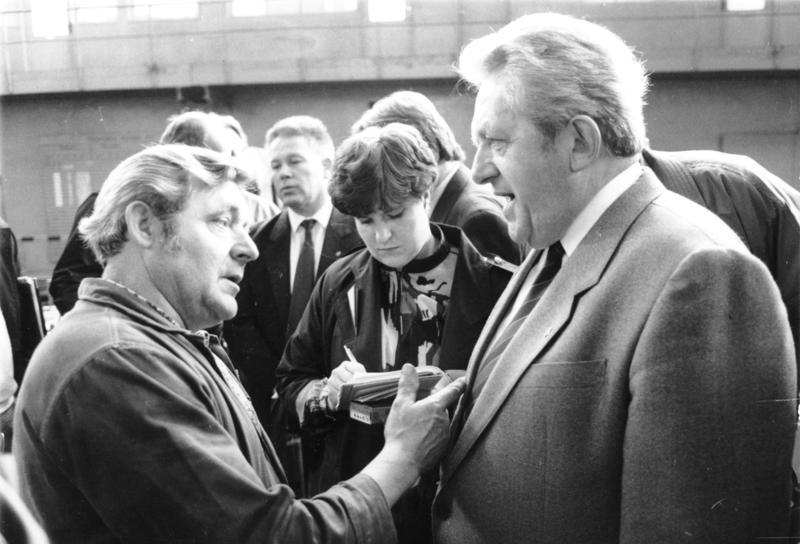
- Müller (right) in 1989

First Secretary of the Socialist Unity Party in Bezirk Erfurt
- In office 11 April 1980 – 11 November 1989
- Second Secretary: Adolf Wicklein; Kurt Rundnagel; Wolfgang Pforte
- Preceded by: Alois Bräutigam
- Succeeded by: Herbert Kroker

Second Secretary of the Socialist Unity Party in Bezirk Neubrandenburg
- In office February 1974 – April 1980
- First Secretary: Johannes Chemnitzer
- Preceded by: Gerhard Zettler
- Succeeded by: Werner Breitsprecher
Volkskammer
Member of the Volkskammer for Nordhausen, Sondershausen
In office 25 June 1981 – 16 November 1989
Preceded by	multi-member district
Succeeded by	Klaus Köhlitz

Personal details
- Born: Gerhard Müller; 4 February 1928 Chemnitz, Free State of Saxony, Weimar Republic
- Died: 19 June 2020 (aged 92) Neubrandenburg, Mecklenburg-Vorpommern, Germany
- Party: Socialist Unity Party (1946–1989)
- Other political affiliations: Social Democratic Party (1946)
- Education: Party Academy Karl Marx
- Occupation: Politician; Party Functionary; Teacher
- Awards: Patriotic Order of Merit, 1st class; Order of Karl Marx; Hero of Labour
- Central institution membership: 1985–1989: Candidate member, Politburo of the Central Committee; 1981–1989: Full member, Central Committee; Other offices held: 1965–1974: First Secretary, Socialist Unity Party in Neubrandenburg-Land; 1955–1963: Secretary for Economics, Public Education, and Culture, Socialist Unity Party in Bezirk Neubrandenburg

Gerhard Müller (4 February 1928 – 19 June 2020) was a German teacher, politician and party functionary of the Socialist Unity Party (SED).

In the German Democratic Republic, he served as the longtime First Secretary of the SED in Bezirk Erfurt and was a candidate member of the Politburo of the Central Committee of the SED.

== Life and career ==
=== Early career ===
Gerhard Müller was born on 4 February 1928, in Chemnitz, growing up in a working-class family. His early education spanned from 1934 to 1942 at the primary school in Bad Brambach, followed by a brief period at the commercial school in Auerbach. In 1942, he switched to the Teacher Training Institute in Auerbach, where he studied until January 1945.

Afterward, he was enlisted in the Reich Labor Service and experienced the end of World War II within its ranks. Until January 1946, Müller worked as a construction worker in Landwüst and later in Plauen. In the winter of 1946, he obtained a place at the Teacher Training Institute in Bad Elster, resuming his studies until August 1946. During this time, Müller initially joined the SPD but later became a member of the SED due to the forced merger of the SPD and KPD. He also joined the FDGB (Free German Trade Union Federation) and the FDJ (Free German Youth).

Commencing the school year 1946/47, he began teaching as a Neulehrer at the elementary school in Breitenfeld in the Vogtland region. After completing his first teaching examination in 1948, he was appointed as the school's headmaster. In 1950, Müller successfully completed his second teaching examination and then transitioned to the council of Oelsnitz district, where he served until 1952 as the district's training leader and deputy district school councilor. In 1952, he was appointed as the district school councilor. However, in February 1953, he was delegated to his first three-year course at the Karl Marx Party Academy, which he completed in August 1955, earning a diploma in social sciences.

=== Bezirk Neubrandenburg SED career ===
After this, Gerhard Müller was delegated by the SED to the Bezirk Neubrandenburg, where he served as the secretary for economics, public education, and culture in the local SED leadership until 1963. Concurrently, from 1962 to 1966, he pursued distance education at the Neubrandenburg Vocational School of Agriculture, graduating as an agricultural engineer. Due to the double responsibilities of distance learning and party activities, he was relieved of his role as secretary in the district leadership in 1963. Until 1965, Müller was tasked with leading the department of schools, higher education, and culture at the SED leadership in Neubrandenburg. During this time, he also served as the deputy head of the ideological commission of the Bezirk leadership. In 1964, he was appointed as an upper-level secondary school teacher.

The SED appointed Müller as the First Secretary of the SED in the rural district of Neubrandenburg (later Neubrandenburg-Land and not to be confused with the city and Bezirk of the same name) in 1965, a position he held until 1974. During this tenure, he briefly taught as a specialized teacher for civic education in extended secondary schools in 1966. Between 1969 and 1970, he participated in a one-year special training course for qualifying senior party cadres at the Central Institute for Socialist Economic Management under the SED Central Committee.

In February 1974, when the Second Secretary of the Bezirk Neubrandenburg SED, Gerhard Zettler, was replaced, Müller was appointed as his successor at the district delegates' conference held in mid-February 1974. This made him the second most powerful figure in the Bezirk after the First Secretary Johannes Chemnitzer, and effectively chief of staff of the local SED leadership.

=== Bezirk Erfurt SED career ===
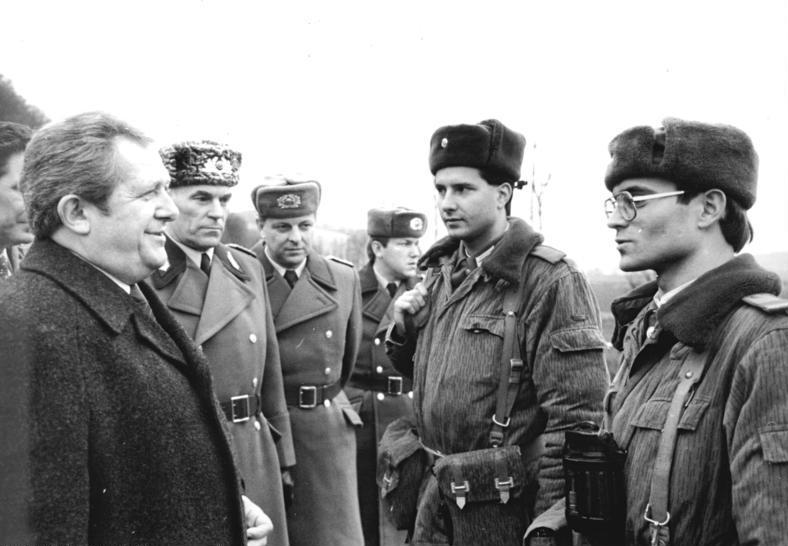
Müller (left) visiting border guards in February 1986

In April 1980, following intense internal criticism reported anonymously to Erich Mückenberger, the then-chairman of the Central Party Control Commission, Alois Bräutigam, the long-standing First Secretary of the SED in Bezirk Erfurt, resigned from his position, officially citing health reasons. Simultaneously, on 11 April 1980, during a session of the Bezirk Erfurt SED, Müller was co-opted into the Bezirk leadership and appointed as the new First Secretary.

Unlike all other Bezirk First Secretaries at that time, Müller was not a member of the SED Central Committee (ZK) at that point. It wasn't until the X. Party Congress of the SED in 1981 that he was elected as a member of the ZK. Following Müller, only four new Bezirk First Secretaries were appointed until November 1989.

Additionally, he ran for the Volkskammer elections for the first time in 1981 and served as a deputy in the 8th and 9th legislative periods. In the lead-up to the XI. Party Congress of the SED in 1986, the last personnel changes occurred. At the 11th session of the SED Central Committee on 22 November 1985, three new candidate members of the Politburo of the Central Committee of the SED, the de facto highest leadership body in East Germany, were elected: Werner Eberlein, Siegfried Lorenz, and Gerhard Müller. This ascent positioned Müller within the leading party body of the SED.

Müller's tenure was viewed negatively. His leadership style was authoritarian, occasionally described as feudalistic, similar to his predecessors. He was also viewed as a hardliner: During the summer of 1989, he delivered several speeches praising the violent suppression of the student unrest in China as exemplary.

Müller was awarded the Patriotic Order of Merit in 1978, the Karl Marx Order in 1984, and the Hero of Labour title in 1988.

=== Peaceful Revolution ===
On 9 November 1989, the long-anticipated 10th session of the Central Committee of the SED took place. Prior to this session, the incumbent Politburo had resigned collectively. Despite Müller's extensive tenure as the First Secretary of an Bezirk SED leadership, he stood for re-election to the Politburo. However, among the members of the Central Committee, he failed to garner enough votes and was not elected to the new Politburo. This loss of trust led him to submit his resignation as the First Secretary before the Bezirk Erfurt SED Delegates' Conference scheduled for 11 November 1989 in Erfurt. His resignation request was granted by the remaining leadership. Herbert Kroker was elected as his successor.

He was removed by his party from the Volkskammer a week later, on 16 November 1989. On the same day, the newly elected Central Party Control Commission of the SED, chaired by Werner Eberlein, convened for the first time. They laid out provisions to hold both former First Secretaries, Hans Albrecht of Bezirk Suhl and Gerhard Müller, accountable for legal violations. For the first time, the party newspaper Neues Deutschland highlighted Müller's alleged legal transgressions.

On 29 November 1989, considering the existing legally relevant allegations, the commission recommended expulsion from the party. Subsequently, on 1 December 1989, the Erfurt Criminal Police initiated an investigation against Müller on suspicion of breach of trust through unjustified use of financial resources, focusing mainly on him having funneled public money into the construction of a luxurious hunting lodge near Luisenthal. At the final session of the SED Central Committee on 3 December 1989, Müller was expelled from both the Central Committee and the SED.

=== Reunified Germany ===
Regarding legal matters, on 1 June 1990, Müller was charged, and in 1992, he was convicted of incitement to breach of trust and fraud, resulting in an eight-month prison sentence, which was served with ten months of pretrial detention. In 1992, another trial concerning breach of trust in Erfurt commenced but was later suspended.

Subsequently, on 3 November 1994, the Erfurt Regional Court sentenced him to eight months in prison, suspended on probation, for incitement to electoral fraud during the municipal elections in the German Democratic Republic (East Germany) in 1989.

Müller resided in Neubrandenburg and was a member of the DKP. He died on 19 June 2020, at the age of 92.
