= Alois Bräutigam =

German-Czech politician (1916–2007)

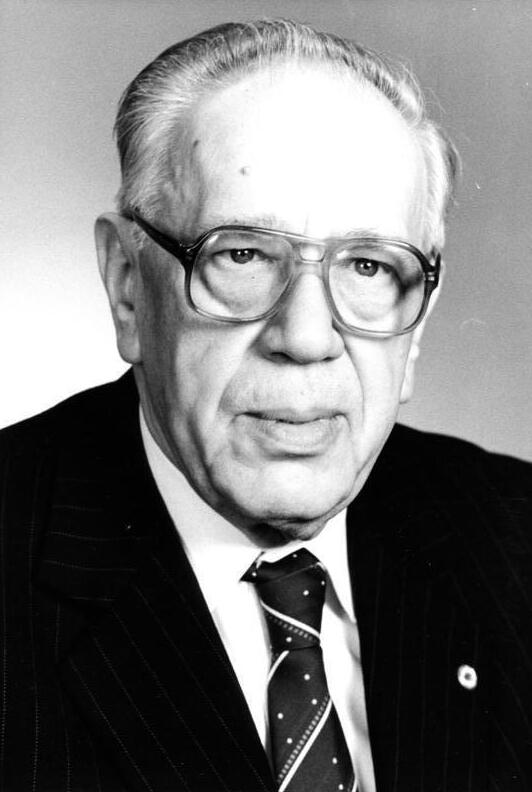
- Bräutigam in 1988

First Secretary of the Socialist Unity Party in Bezirk Erfurt
- In office 27 June 1958 – 11 April 1980
- Second Secretary: Paul Roscher; Adolf Wicklein
- Preceded by: Hermann Fischer
- Succeeded by: Gerhard Müller

First Secretary of the Socialist Unity Party at SDAG Wismut
- In office December 1954 – June 1958
- Second Secretary: Rolf Weihs
- Preceded by: Günter Röder
- Succeeded by: Rolf Weihs
Volkskammer
Member of the Volkskammer for Eisenach, Gotha
In office 3 December 1958 – 25 June 1981
Preceded by	multi-member district
Succeeded by	Ludwig Mecklinger

Personal details
- Born: 28 April 1916 Grünlas, Bohemia, Austria-Hungary
- Died: 10 January 2007 (aged 90) Erfurt, Thuringia, Germany
- Party: Socialist Unity Party (1946–1989)
- Other political affiliations: Communist Party of Germany (1946); Communist Party of Czechoslovakia (1934–1946)
- Education: "Karl Marx" Party Academy
- Occupation: Politician; Party Functionary; Policeman; Miner
- Awards: Patriotic Order of Merit, 1st class; Banner of Labor; Order of Karl Marx; Star of Peoples' Friendship
- Central institution membership: 1958–1989: Full member, Central Committee; Other offices held: 1963–1972: Member, National Defence Council; 1953–1954: First Secretary, Socialist Unity Party in Erfurt; 1950–1951: First Secretary, Socialist Unity Party in Weimar district; 1949–1950: First Secretary, Socialist Unity Party in Arnstadt district

Alois Bräutigam (28 April 1916 – 10 January 2007) was a German-Czech miner, policeman, politician and party functionary of the Socialist Unity Party (SED).

Born in the Kingdom of Bohemia, Bräutigam joined the Communist Party of Czechoslovakia and was a member of a local resistance movement during World War II.

He moved to the Soviet occupation zone after the war, where he became a SED functionary. He served as the longtime First Secretary of the Bezirk Erfurt SED before being forced into retirement in 1980.

== Life and career ==
=== Czechoslovakia ===
Bräutigam, the son of a miner, was born on 28 April 1916 in Grünlas, Bohemia, Austria-Hungary (today Loučky, part of Nové Sedlo, Czech Republic). He completed an apprenticeship as a bricklayer from 1929 to 1932 after attending elementary school in Nové Sedlo. He then worked both in this profession and as a miner.

In 1929, he joined the Communist Youth Association, in 1932 became a member of the Combat Community for Red Sports Unit, and in 1934, he joined the Communist Party of Czechoslovakia as well as the Union of Friends of the Soviet Union.

From 1937 to 1938, he served in the Czechoslovak Army. After a brief period of unemployment, he served in the Wehrmacht from January to April 1939. At the start of World War II in September 1939, he was drafted back into the Wehrmacht and served in an artillery regiment.

He participated in the French Campaign in May/June 1940. After falling ill, he was discharged from the front in February 1942 and held the rank of Obergefreiter.

Until 1945, he worked again as a miner in a clay pit and participated in illegal political work against the Nazi regime as a member of the local resistance movement in Neusattl in 1944/45.

After the war, he was head of the Antifa Office in Neusattl and served in the Czechoslovak police force in 1945/1946.

=== Early career ===
In 1946, he moved to Schmalkalden in the Soviet occupation zone. In February 1946, he joined the KPD (Communist Party of Germany), and after the forced merger of the KPD and SPD (Social Democratic Party of Germany) in April 1946, he became a member of the SED (Socialist Unity Party of Germany).

From July 1946 to January 1947, he was a Volkspolizei policeman (sergeant) at the Schmalkalden district police office and from 1946 to 1949, a city councilor in Schmalkalden.

In 1947, he became a full-time SED employee, initially as a political staff member and chairman of the SED in Schmalkalden. From 1947 to 1952, he was a member of the SED state leadership in Thuringia.

From July 1949 to November 1950, he was the First Secretary of the Arnstadt district SED, and from November 1950 to 1951, First Secretary of the Weimar district SED.

In 1951/52, he studied at the "Karl Marx" Party Academy. Subsequently, from January to May 1953, he was head of the State Organs Department of the Bezirk Erfurt SED. From June 1953 to 1954, he was First Secretary of the SED in Erfurt and a city councilor there.

=== SDAG Wismut SED First Secretary ===
In December 1954, Bräutigam was transferred to the uranium mining company Soviet-German joint-stock company (SDAG) Wismut SED as First Secretary, succeeding Günther Röder.

The SDAG Wismut SED party organization, titled territorial party leadership (German: Gebietsparteileitung), held the rank of a Bezirk party organization, unlike all other industrial party organizations, as SDAG Wismut was a massive mining undertaking with dozens of locations. It was described as a "state within a state".

The Niederschlema mining disaster, with 33 dead and over 100 injured, and subsequent cover-up happened during his tenure.

=== Bezirk Erfurt SED First Secretary ===
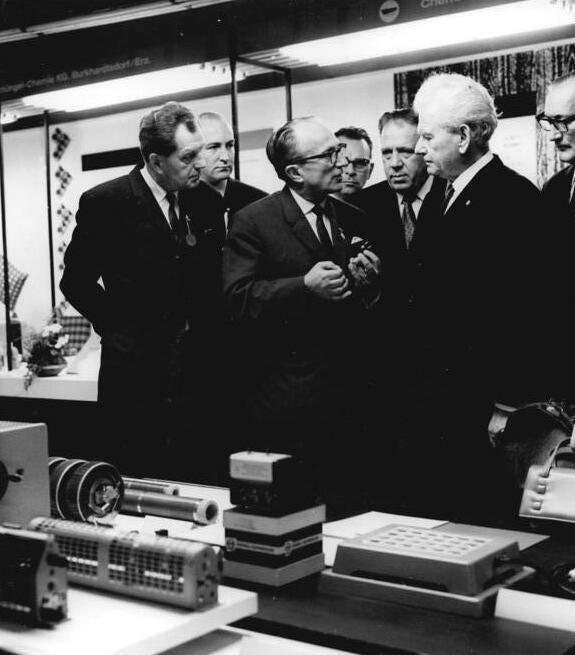
Bräutigam (right of center) and Hermann Matern (right) visiting the party conference of the satellite party CDU in Erfurt in October 1968

In June 1958, he returned to the Bezirk Erfurt SED, succeeding Hermann Fischer as First Secretary. Fischer was demoted to chairman of the Bezirk Erfurt SED Party Control Commission.

He additionally became a full member of the Central Committee of the SED in June (V. Party Congress), serving until its collective resignation in December 1989, and of the Volkskammer in December, nominally representing a constituency in the southwest of his Bezirk.

In the 1960s, he also was a member of the National Defense Council of the GDR, likely due to the significant northwestern border of Bezirk Erfurt with West Germany, though he had to leave in 1972.

Bräutigam's tenure was described as authoritarian.

Bräutigam was awarded the Medal of Merit of the GDR in 1960, Patriotic Order of Merit in silver, in gold in 1966 and the honor clasp to this order in 1981, the Banner of Labor in 1964, the Order of Karl Marx in 1976 and the Star of Peoples' Friendship in 1986.

=== Retirement ===
In April 1980, Bräutigam had to announce his resignation, officially for health reasons, following massive internal criticism that had been anonymously directed at Erich Mückenberger, then the Chairman of the Central Party Control Commission. On 11 April 1980, Gerhard Müller, Second Secretary of the Bezirk Neubrandenburg SED, was appointed as the new First Secretary.

Bräutigam was allowed to remain in the Central Committee, but retired from the Volkskammer in 1981 and was transferred to a politically irrelevant position at the People's Solidarity, a SED-controlled mass organization providing welfare for elderly people. Bräutigam initially joined the People's Solidarity's Central Board as deputy chairman in 1981, but became chairman in June 1982 upon the retirement of Robert Lehmann. He resigned on 11 December 1989.

After the Peaceful Revolution, Bräutigam withdrew from public life. He died in early 2007 and was buried in the main cemetery in Erfurt.
