= Gerda Szepansky =

- Born: Gerda Lange; 6 September 1925; Berlin, Germany
- Died: 3 August 2004; Berlin, Germany
- Occupations: Author; Journalist; Political activist School teacher Stage performer
- Political party: SED; SEW
- Spouse: Wolfgang Szepansky (1910-2008)
- Children: Regina Szepansky (1965-2019) and 3 others

Gerda Szepansky (born Gerda Lange: 6 September 1925 - 3 August 2004) was a teacher in West Berlin who lost her job for political reasons. She had dreamed of working as a journalist since childhood, and following her dismissal was able to focus on building a successful career producing "cheerful stories about dogs and babies" for magazines. She also appeared on stage in post-war Berlin in cabaret and independent theatre groups. She married a concentration camp survivor (who was also a committed communist) and, after their children had grown up, published a number of popular history books focusing on contemporary history and on the Hitler years through which she had lived as a teenager, and during which her husband had been a resistance activist. Literary success and the passing of the years brought her a measure of official respectability: in 1996 she was a recipient of the Order of Merit ("Bundesverdienstkreuz am Bande").

== Life ==
Gerda Lange was born and grew up in central Berlin. Her childhood ambition to embark on a career as a journalist proved unrealistic under Hitlerism during the war or indeed, with the centre of Berlin reduced to rubble and life a daily battle for survival, during its immediate aftermath. There was, however, a desperate shortage of working-age population and of teachers, which was recognised as an important social issue by the military administrators responsible for Berlin. She embarked on a career as a school teacher under the emergency "New Teachers" scheme. It was at an afterhours meeting of antifascist teachers that she met and teamed up with another teacher, Wolfgang Szepansky, a communist who had survived the Nazi years. On 27 September 1947 the two of them married. The children whom they taught formed a neat line as the young couple made their way to the registry office. Despite the widespread austerity of the times, there was some disappointment among their young witnesses that there was no bridal carriage and that they had arrived for the ceremony on foot.

Following the West German currency reform (from which the Soviet occupation zone, including the eastern part of Berlin, was excluded) and the ensuing eleven month Soviet blockade of Berlin, there was an intensification of political and administrative divisions between the eastern part of Berlin and the parts under US, British or French administration, which would come to be known soon after 1949 as "West Berlin". The Tempelhof quarter of Berlin in which the Szepanskys had ended up living was in the U.S. (western) sector of the city. They were nevertheless both members of the recently launched Socialist Unity Party, a successor party to the Communist Party which was already securely rooted in the Soviet zone, but had completely failed to gain traction with more than a handful of voters in Berlin's western sectors. After 1949, the Szepanskys found themselves viewed with intensifying suspicion at work. That year or shortly afterwards they were both dismissed from the West Berlin schools service. In the case of Gerda Szepansky, at least one source refers to her dismissal having resulted from "aktiver Betätigung im Sinne der SED", a convoluted but widely requoted expression referencing her involvement with the East German Socialist Unity Party.

During May 1949, the western occupation zones were rebranded and relaunched as the U.S. sponsored German Federal Republic (West Germany), followed in October 1949 by the rebranding and relaunch of the Soviet sponsored German Democratic Republic (East Germany) in what had hitherto been known as the Soviet occupation zone. The Berlin blockade of 1948/49 and other increasingly alarming "cold war" events had left public opinion in West Berlin deeply suspicious of the Soviets and their comrades in East Berlin. The East German enterprise was frequently seen as no more than an unconvincing proxy for Moscow's continuing imperialist ambitions. Nevertheless, each year, on May Day, the Szepanskys would hang a large red flag from the balcony of the apartment they shared with their children at Berlin-Mariendorf. One year a neighbour alerted the police. As the political division of Berlin came to be matched, during the 1950s and 1960s, with physical barriers, members of the Socialist Unity Party of West Berlin like the Szepanskys were urged by neighbours to "go over there - across "the wall" to East Germany. But their roots were in what had become West Berlin, along with their parents, friends and apartment. They had, in any case, discovered that it was perfectly possible to "show solidarity with the east" from the west.

Gerda Szepansky's stage career was evidently relatively brief. Needing a job following her exclusion from the teaching profession, in or before 1951, she took charge of the "Kulturclub" ("Arts and culture club") of the West Berlin section of the Society for German–Soviet Friendship ("Gesellschaft für Deutsch-Sowjetische Freundschaft" / DSF), and the management of the Majakowski Gallery, an exhibition space operated under the auspices of the DSF along the Kurfürstendamm (avenue). At around the same time, following a lengthy period of unemployment, her husband became club house manager at the West Berlin terminus-offices of the (East German) "Reichsbahn" (national railway service). Both the Szepanskys' salaries came from "over there" - East Germany.

By the middle of the 1960s, she was the mother of four small if growing children. According to a fellow journalist she and her husband were the perfect "political dreamer". Although Wolfgang Szepansky had been a teacher when he and Gerda met up, before 1933 he had been and artist. As their family grew he was the philosopher-artis and, on occasion, the dreamer, while Gerda ran the family, attending to everything from the family finances to the morning cocoa. She nevertheless remained politically committed. During the 1970s, she was involved in the political campaigns of the time, demonstrating with comrades against the locating of nuclear weapons and U.S. military bases in West Germany, Section 218 of the West German penal code (concerning abortion), and what she and her husband (and others) saw as the collective amnesia of the political establishment concerning the Hitler years and their legacy. As far as Gerda and Wolfgang Szepansky were concerned during this period, they and the German Democratic Republic were on the right side of history.

By 1978, when her first book was published, Gertda Szepansky was already 53. "Der erste Schritt" (1978) concerns women of the "'68 movement in Germany". Further books followed, dealing with women's lives and the Hitler years.

Szepansky was also a member of the Berlin-based New Literature Society ("Neue Gesellschaft für Literatur" / NGL), an elected member of the organisation's controlling committee between 1980 and 1982. The NGL was a pioneering authors' association which had been founded un 1973 by Ingeborg Drewitz. In 1996, with 700 members, it could be described as Berlin's strongest literary association, but was dissolved in 2004 by which time some members felt that reunification had made many of its objectives superfluous or redundant.

In 1996, Wolfgang and Gerda Szepansky, who had both lost their jobs in the teaching service at the behest of German government agencies in (West) Berlin forty-five years earlier, were both recipients of the Order of Merit ("Verdienstkreuz am Bande"). Supporters would clearly say that it was Germany that had caught up with the tide of history.

Gerda Szepansky's final months were blighted by illness, from which she died on 3 August 2004. Despite having selected a husband fiftenn years her senior, she predeceased him by four years. Following an exceptionally well attended funeral celebration then urn containing what remained of her body was buried in the presence of her immediate family at the Marienhof II protestant cemetery, close to her home.

== Selected works ==
- Der erste Schritt. Erzählungen. Edition Neue Wege, Berlin 1978, ISBN 3-88348-019-3.
- "Blitzmädel", "Heldenmutter", "Kriegerwitwe". Frauenleben im Zweiten Weltkrieg.(weitere Auflagen 1985, 1986, 1987, 1989, 1990, 1991, 1995).
- Frauen leisten Widerstand. 1933 bis 1945. Lebensgeschichten nach Interviews und Dokumenten. Fischer-Taschenbuch-Verl., Frankfurt am Main 1983, ISBN 3-596-23741-6 (weitere Auflagen 1988, 1989, 1994).
- Die stille Emanzipation. Frauen in der DDR. Fischer-Taschenbuch-Verl., Frankfurt am Main 1995, ISBN 3-596-12075-6.
- (Co-Hrsg. und Vorwort von Helga Schwarz) ... und dennoch blühten Blumen. Frauen-KZ Ravensbrück. Dokumente, Berichte, Gedichte und Zeichnungen vom Lageralltag 1939–1945. (PDF; 1,7 MB) Landeszentrale für Politische Bildung, Potsdam 2000, ISBN 3-932502-25-6.
- Lauf schneller, mein Herz, die Zeit bleibt nicht stehen. Erzählungen – Eigendruck im Selbstverlag 2004
