= Hans-Dieter Fritschler =

East German politician (1941–2021)

- Fritschler c. 1989

First Secretary of the Socialist Unity Party in Bad Salzungen district
- In office 1 April 1982 – December 1989
- Second Secretary: Kurt-Jürgen Riese
- Preceded by: Hans-Joachim Herzog
- Succeeded by: Position abolished

First Secretary of the Free German Youth in Bezirk Suhl
- In office 10 October 1973 – 7 September 1978
- Preceded by: Helmut Weisleder
- Succeeded by: Rosita Kleinpeter

Personal details
- Born: Hans-Dieter Fritschler; 18 May 1941 Hildburghausen, State of Thuringia, Nazi Germany (now Germany)
- Died: 19 September 2021 (aged 80) Suhl, Thuringia, Germany
- Party: Socialist Unity Party
- Other political affiliations: Party of Democratic Socialism (1989–2007); The Left (2007–2021)
- Children: 2
- Education: Jugendhochschule „Wilhelm Pieck“; "Karl Marx" Party Academy (Dipl.-Ges.-Wiss.)
- Occupation: Politician; Party Functionary; Forestry Worker

Hans-Dieter Fritschler (18 May 1941 – 19 September 2021), more commonly known by his initials HDF, was an East German politician and party functionary of the Socialist Unity Party (SED).

Fritschler was a local functionary of the Free German Youth (FDJ) and SED in Bezirk Suhl in the 1970s and 1980s, culminating in his 1982 appointment as First Secretary of the SED in the district of Bad Salzungen.

Dubbed "Sisyphus in Bad Salzungen", he rose to international prominence through his depiction in the 1988 book Der Erste, which provided an at-the-time candid look behind the scenes of the SED and openly discussed problems of the East German society and command economy.

After the Peaceful Revolution, he was initially unemployed, eventually working for the SED's successor, the Party of Democratic Socialism (PDS) until becoming disabled after a coma.

== Early life ==
Fritschler was born in 1941 in Hildburghausen to a poor working-class family. His father died during the war and he was raised alongside his six siblings by his mother, who worked in a tea factory.

At age 14, Fritschler completed Volksschule and took on an apprenticeship as a forestry worker, working in nearby Heldburg. Fritschler voluntarily joined the recently founded National People's Army in 1955 and was stationed in Bezirk Rostock near the Baltic Sea, at Prora. There, he also met his future wife Ingrid.

While he had already joined the ruling Socialist Unity Party (SED) earlier, it was primarily due to his working-class identity. He only became a convinced party member through the political officer of his unit, who was a father figure to him. Furthermore, he was motivated by contempt for the opponents of East Germany, whom he saw as "fat speculators".

== Free German Youth career ==
Fritschler soon became a full-time functionary of the FDJ, the only legal youth movement in East Germany, initially working as an instructor of the FDJ in the district of Hildburghausen. In that role, he drove through the district with a motorcycle, collecting membership fees from local FDJ organizations. After attending a one-year course for youth functionaries at the FDJ Youth Academy "Wilhelm Pieck" at the Bogensee, he rose to lead the Hildburghausen FDJ as First Secretary by 1966.

In 1969, Fritschler left his position as First Secretary to attend a three-year course at the SED's "Karl Marx" Party Academy in Berlin, graduating with a diploma in social sciences (Dipl.-Ges.-Wiss.). He thereafter worked at the Central Council of the FDJ for another year in 1973, preparing the 10th World Festival of Youth and Students taking place in East Berlin.

He returned to Bezirk Suhl in October of that year as First Secretary of the Bezirk Suhl FDJ, a position he would hold for the next five years. As Bezirk FDJ First Secretary, he was a statutory member of the Bezirk Suhl SED Secretariat.

== Socialist Unity Party career ==
Fritschler was transferred to the apparatus of the SED in 1980 as Second Secretary of the SED in the district of Hildburghausen. Unexpectedly to him, in April 1982, he was promoted to First Secretary of the SED in the district of Bad Salzungen, the largest district of Bezirk Suhl by population. He replaced Hans-Joachim Herzog, who was dismissed after only a year in office for alleged embezzlement.

This made him the leading politician of the district, heading a party organization with, at last count, 119 employees. For Fritschler, this promotion came out of nowhere and he felt overwhelmed by the personal responsibility and power bundled in the office of First Secretary.

Fritschler additionally was a full member of the Bezirk Suhl SED leadership.

== Der Erste ==
In 1980, local author Landolf Scherzer asked the Culture Secretary of the Bezirk Suhl SED if he could accompany the First Secretary of the Bezirk SED or of a district SED for the purpose of gathering information for a book. He eventually was allowed to accompany Fritschler for four weeks in November and December 1986.

The resulting 1988 book, titled Der Erste. Protokoll einer Begegnung (English: The First One. Minutes of an encounter) was seen by the West German press as providing an unvarnished, behind-the-scenes look at the SED, portraying Fritschler both as First Secretary as well as in private, including moments of contradictions and self-doubt. Unusual for a work published before the Peaceful Revolution, it openly discussed deficiencies of the East German command economy, especially shortages, and also societal issues, including alcoholism. This led to the book being dubbed "a small avant-garde piece of Glasnost for the GDR".

=== Reception ===
Der Erste became a bestseller almost immediately, the first two print runs quickly selling out. The book would later be adapted into a theatre play and a radio drama. A second edition published in 1997 added an additional chapter titled "Der letzte Erste" (English: The last First One), covering the events of the Peaceful Revolution in Bad Salzungen in December 1989.

Fritschler himself initially faced criticism from within the party, especially in the Bezirk Suhl party organization, where the book was considered taboo. His party organization was accused of "hackwork" and of failing to correctly identify and solve problems. Hans Albrecht, his superior as First Secretary of the Bezirk Suhl SED, tried to pressure him to rescind critical statements in the book, but Fritschler refused. Albrecht also unsuccessfully attempted to limit the book's circulation by instituting a preferential sale to the National's People Army.

The internal criticism only subsided when Kurt Hager, Secretary of the Central Committee responsible for culture, approved of the book, and it even became required reading for high-ranking SED functionaries.

== Later years and death ==
Fritschler remained an active member in the SED's successor parties, the Party of Democratic Socialism (PDS) and The Left, serving on the Council of Elders of The Left in Thuringia.

He initially continued to lead the Bad Salzungen district PDS after the Peaceful Revolution, but eventually resigned. After German reunification, he had to move out of his apartment in Bad Salzungen's Nappenplatz and into a Plattenbau, being unable to afford the rent He and several members of his family were left unemployed for quite some time. By November 1992, he worked as a helper at a friend's car dealership in Bad Salzungen. He was later employed by the Thuringian PDS, among other things he served as their campaign manager in the late 1990s and early 2000s. He eventually had to leave this job due to brain surgery and a coma lasting several months, leaving him disabled and reliant on a wheelchair.

Fritschler lived in a high-rise Plattenbau in Suhl's city centre with his wife for the rest of his life. He died in the morning of 19 September 2021 at age 80. Condolences came from Bodo Ramelow, at the time Minister-President of Thuringia.
