= National Defence Council (East Germany) =

East German government body responsible for military and national defense affairs

National Defense Council of the German Democratic Republic
- Nationaler Verteidigungsrat der DDR (German)
- Arms of the GDR

- Arms of the NVA

- Standard of the chairman

Supreme command of the National People's Army overview
- Formed: 16 March 1960
- Dissolved: 6 December 1989 (de facto); 3 October 1990 (de jure)
- Type: National defense
- Headquarters: Strausberg

The National Defense Council of the German Democratic Republic (German: Nationaler Verteidigungsrat der DDR - NVR) was created in 1960 as the supreme state body of the German Democratic Republic (also known as East Germany or the GDR) in charge of national defense matters, including mobilization planning. The NVR held the supreme command of the GDR's armed forces (including the internal security forces), and the NVR's chairman was considered the GDR's commander-in-chief.

== Background ==
The predecessor of the NVR, the Security Commission of the Politbüro of the Central Committee of the Socialist Unity Party of Germany (SED), met for the first time on 6 July 1954. With the enactment of the "Law on the Formation of the National Defense Council of the GDR" on 13 February 1960, the Security Commission was transformed into the NVR. When the State Council was created on 12 September 1960 to replace the office of President, the law creating the State Council (which amended the 1949 GDR Constitution) also acknowledged the role of the NVR in GDR defense policy. On 9 April 1968, when the 1968 GDR Constitution became effective, the NVR was designated as the supreme leadership body of the state in time of war or national emergency, with full legislative and executive authority. The first session of the NVR convened on 16 March 1960; the 78th, and last, session convened on 16 June 1989.

== Composition of the NVR ==
The NVR consisted of a chairman and at least 12 members, all of whom were members of the CC of the SED; most were also members of the CC's Politbüro. Some of the members of the NVR also held leadership roles in the "armed organs" (bewaffnete Organe) of the state: the National People's Army, the Volkspolizei, and the Ministry of State Security. Subordinate to the NVR were the regional (Bezirk) and district (Kreis) operational directorates (Einsatzleitungen), whose chairmen were also the first secretaries of the regional and district party organizations of the SED.

== Leadership of the NVR ==
The NVR strengthened Walter Ulbricht's claim as the leading political force in the SED, as he became the NVR's first chairman, even though Wilhelm Pieck was still president of the GDR at the time. Upon Erich Honecker's rise to power in 1971, he replaced Ulbricht as chairman of the NVR. Egon Krenz became chairman of the NVR on 24 October 1989 following Honecker's resignation as state and party leader, but held on to power himself for only a few weeks in the wake of the Die Wende and the fall of the Berlin Wall.

== Abolition ==
When Egon Krenz, Honecker's successor as leader of the SED, failed in his bid to preserve Communist rule in East Germany, he resigned from his offices in party and government, including as Chairman of the NVR, on 6 December 1989. The NVR's remaining members were dismissed en masse on the same day, and the NVR's powers were assumed by the State Council, now headed by LDPD leader Manfred Gerlach (who was chosen to symbolize the end of the SED's monopoly on power).

The State Council was abolished in turn by the first freely-elected Volkskammer after 1990 East German general election, with its powers (including those it assumed from the NVR) assumed by the Presidium of the People's Chamber, headed by Volkskammer President Sabine Bergmann-Pohl.

== Judicial consequences following German reunification ==
After German reunification in October 1990, individual members of the NVR were prosecuted in connection with their political responsibility for the regime's border policies, including the use of deadly force (Schießbefehl) and the deaths of escapees along the inner-German border and the Berlin Wall. As an example, in 1997, Krenz was convicted and sentenced to 6½ years in prison for his role in the deaths of four escapees, although he actually served just under four years (13 January 2000 to 18 December 2003) before being released on parole.

== Security arrangements for members of the NVR ==
An underground bunker was built in Prenden, near Wandlitz, for the members of the NVR; this was the largest bunker complex in the GDR.

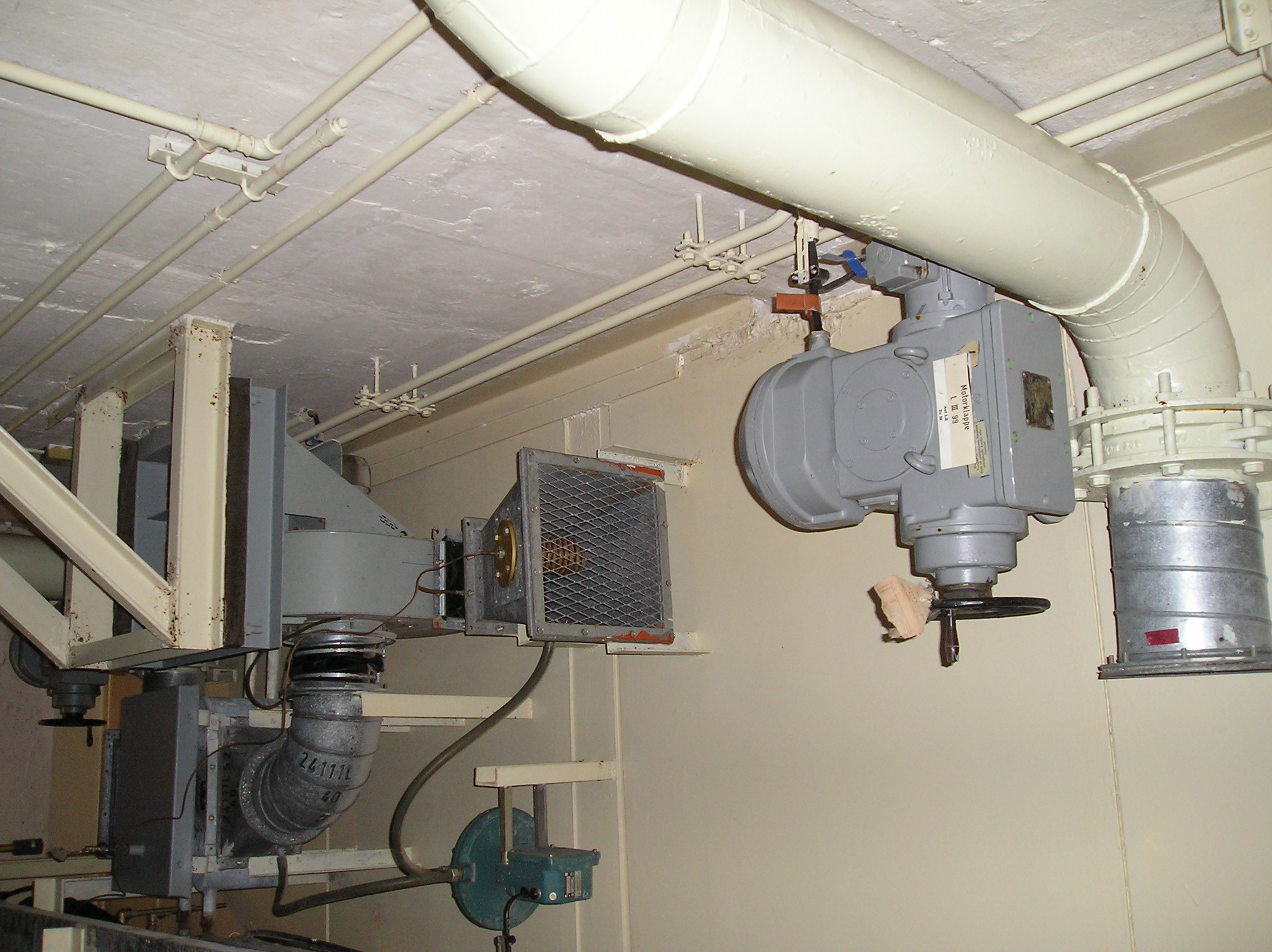

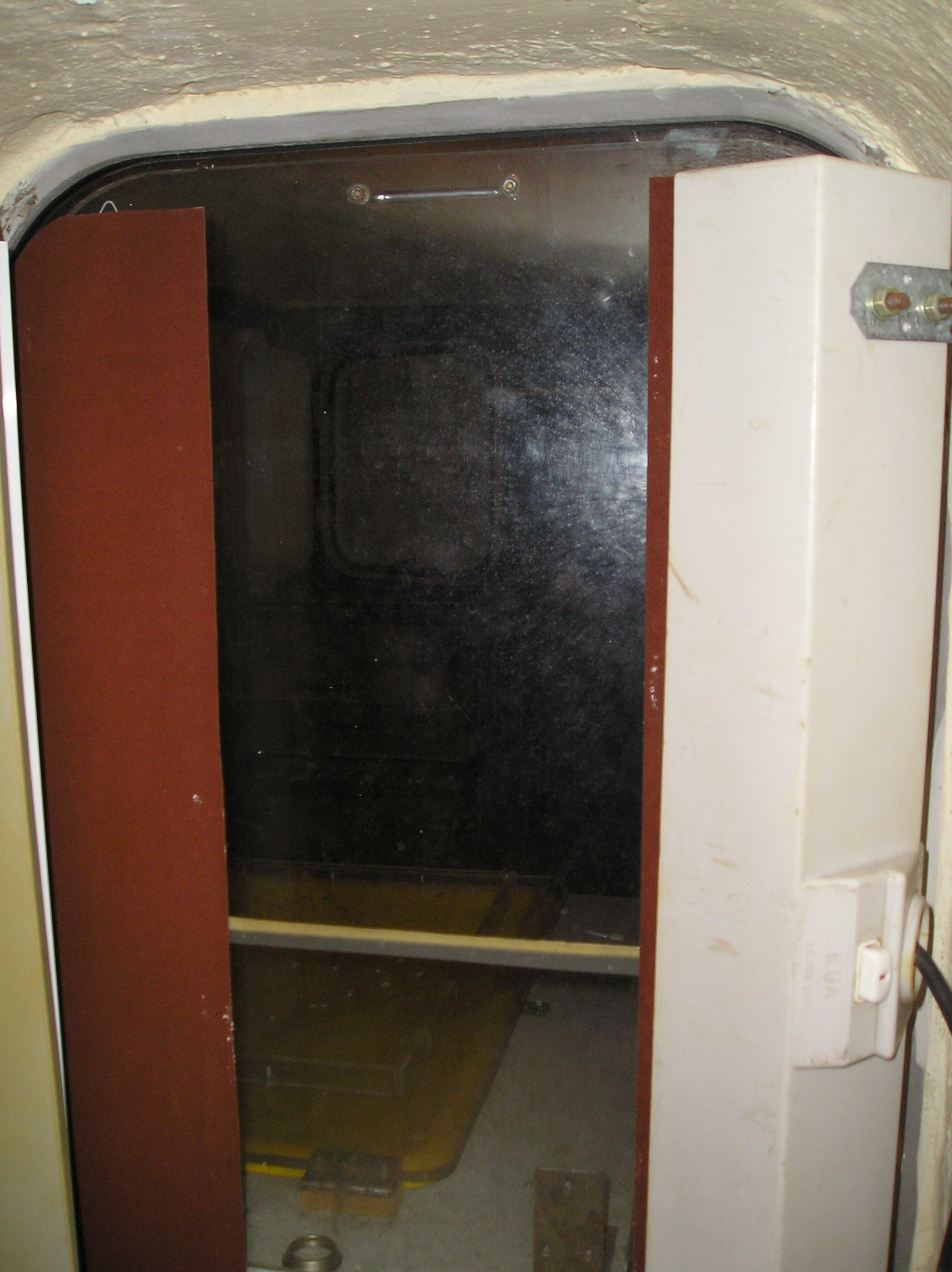

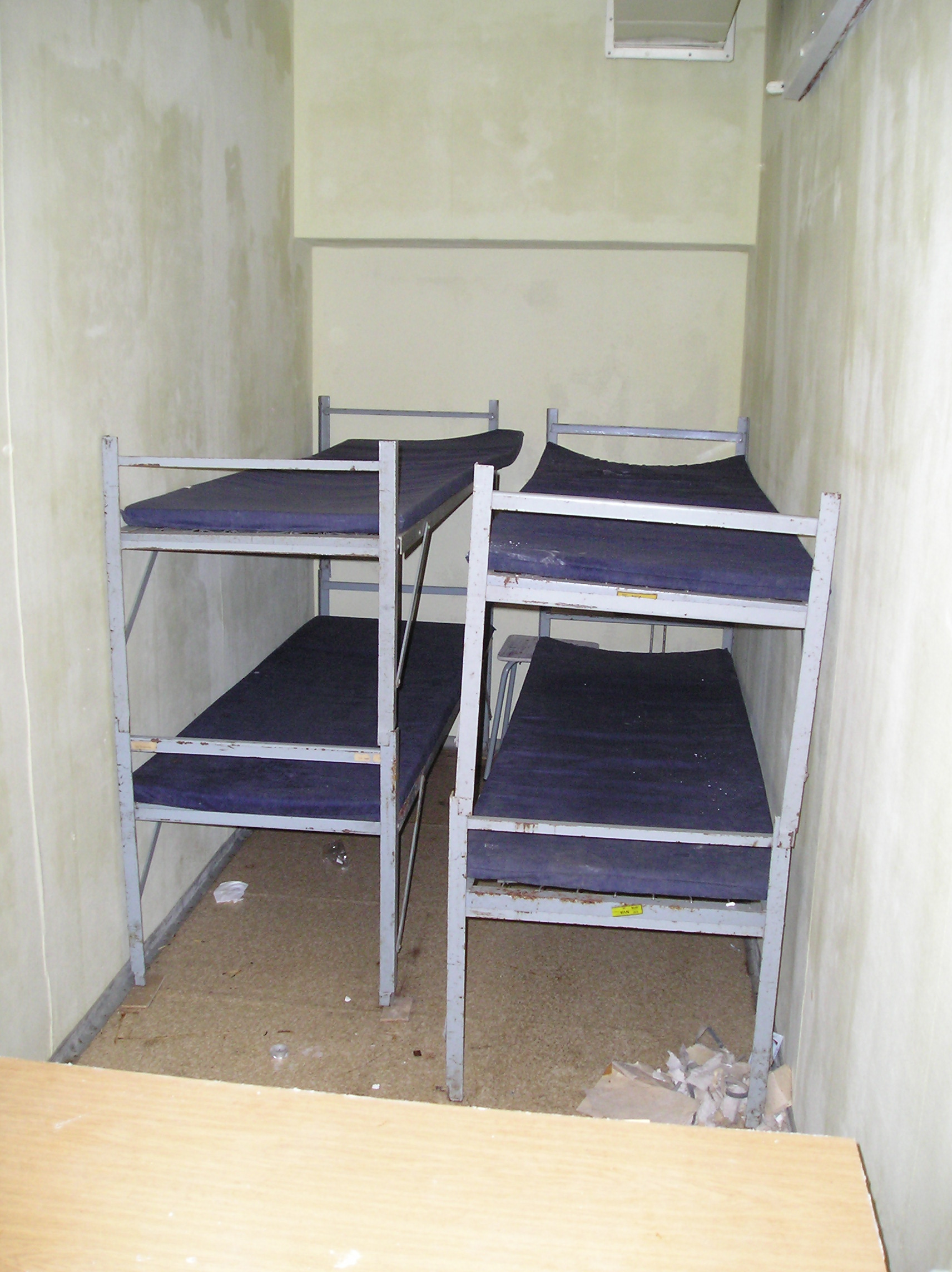

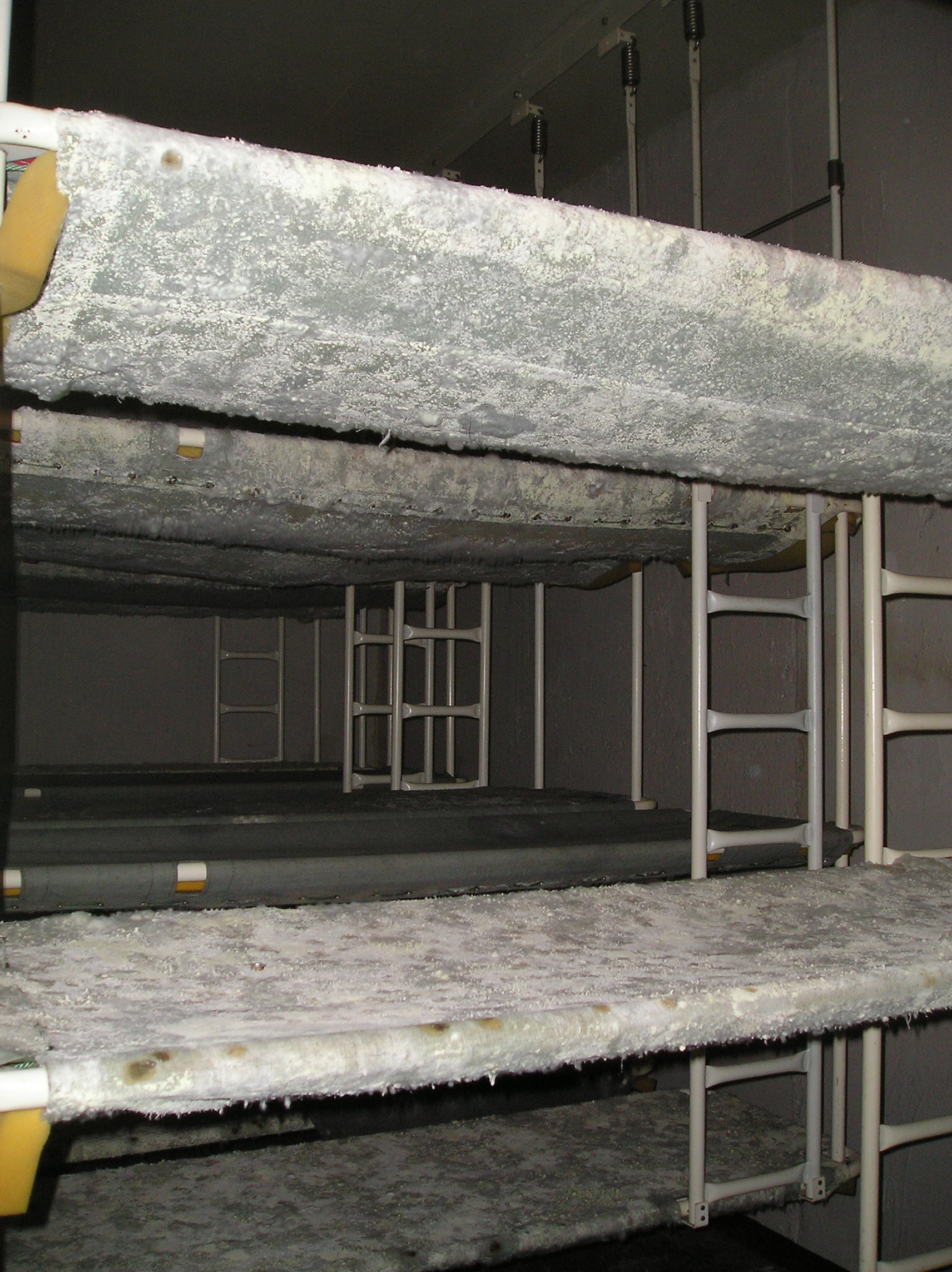

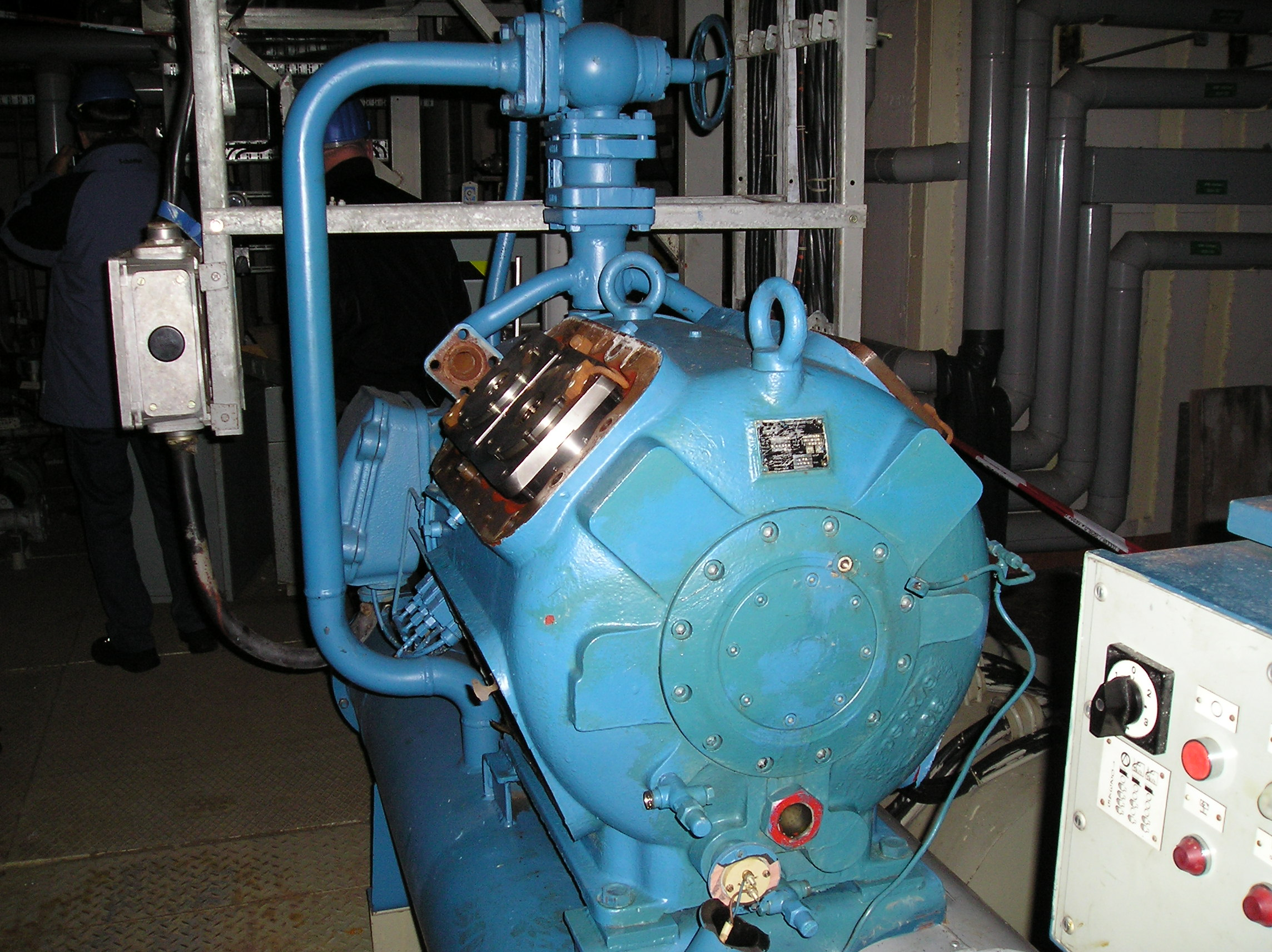

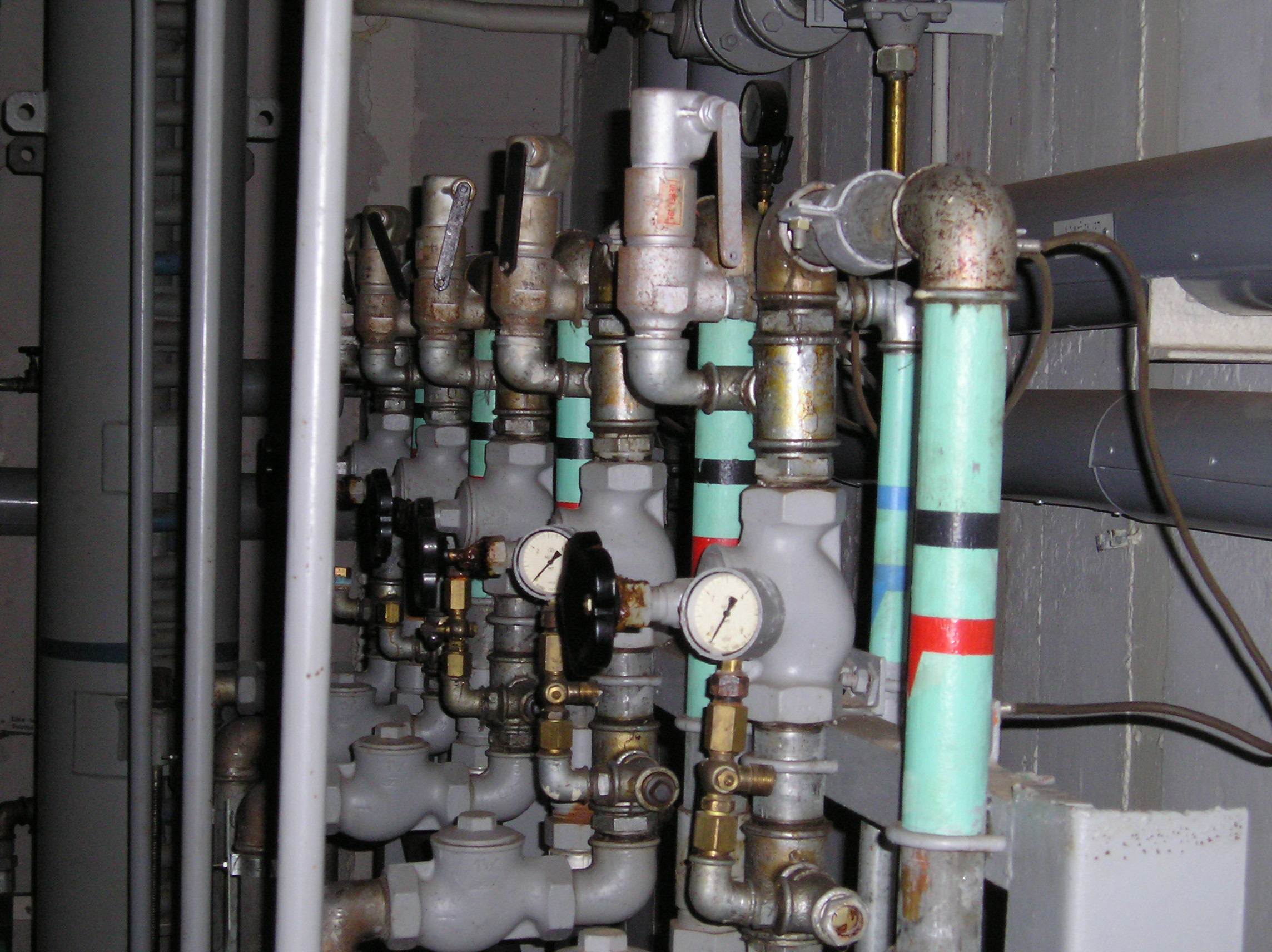

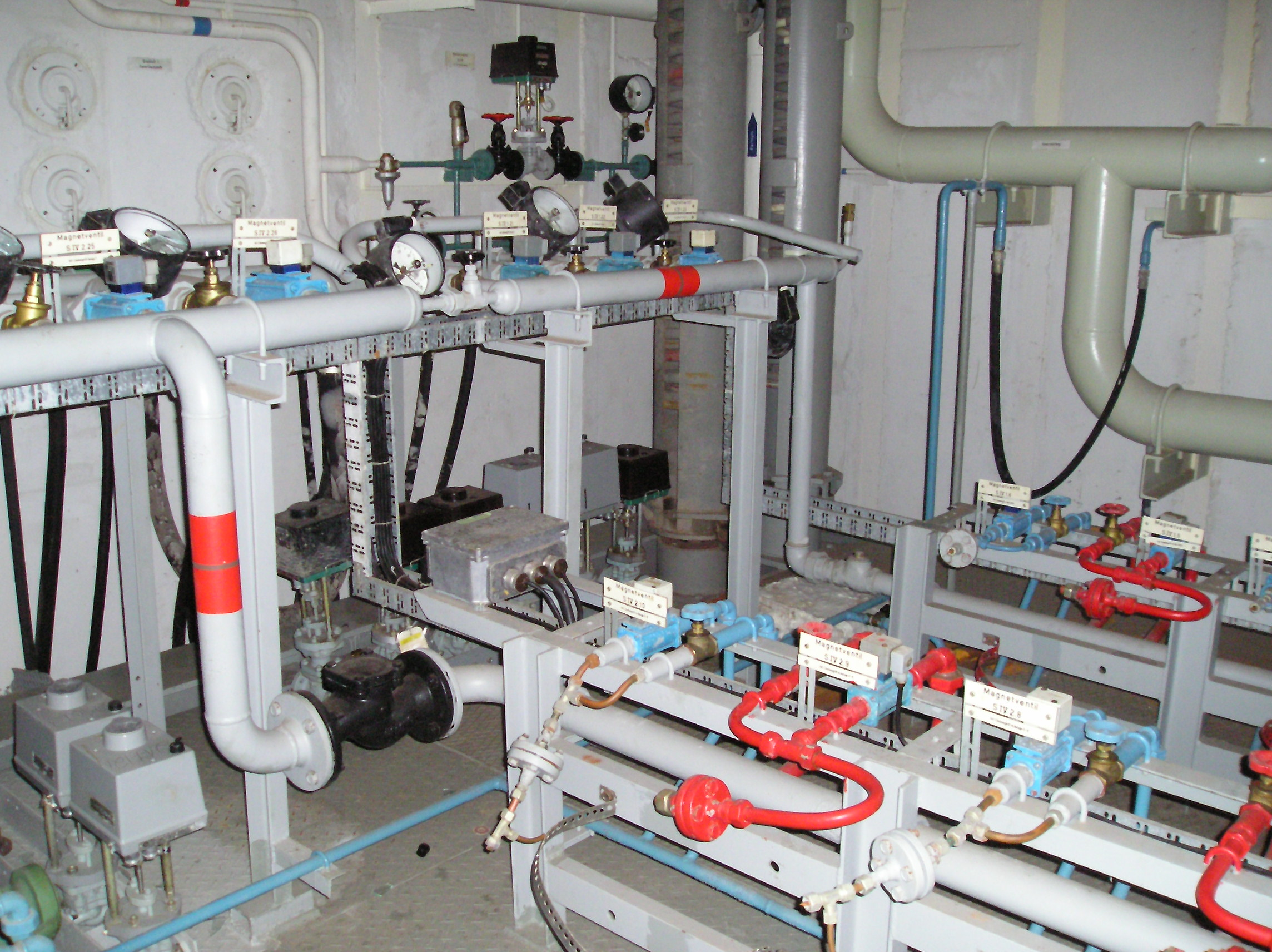

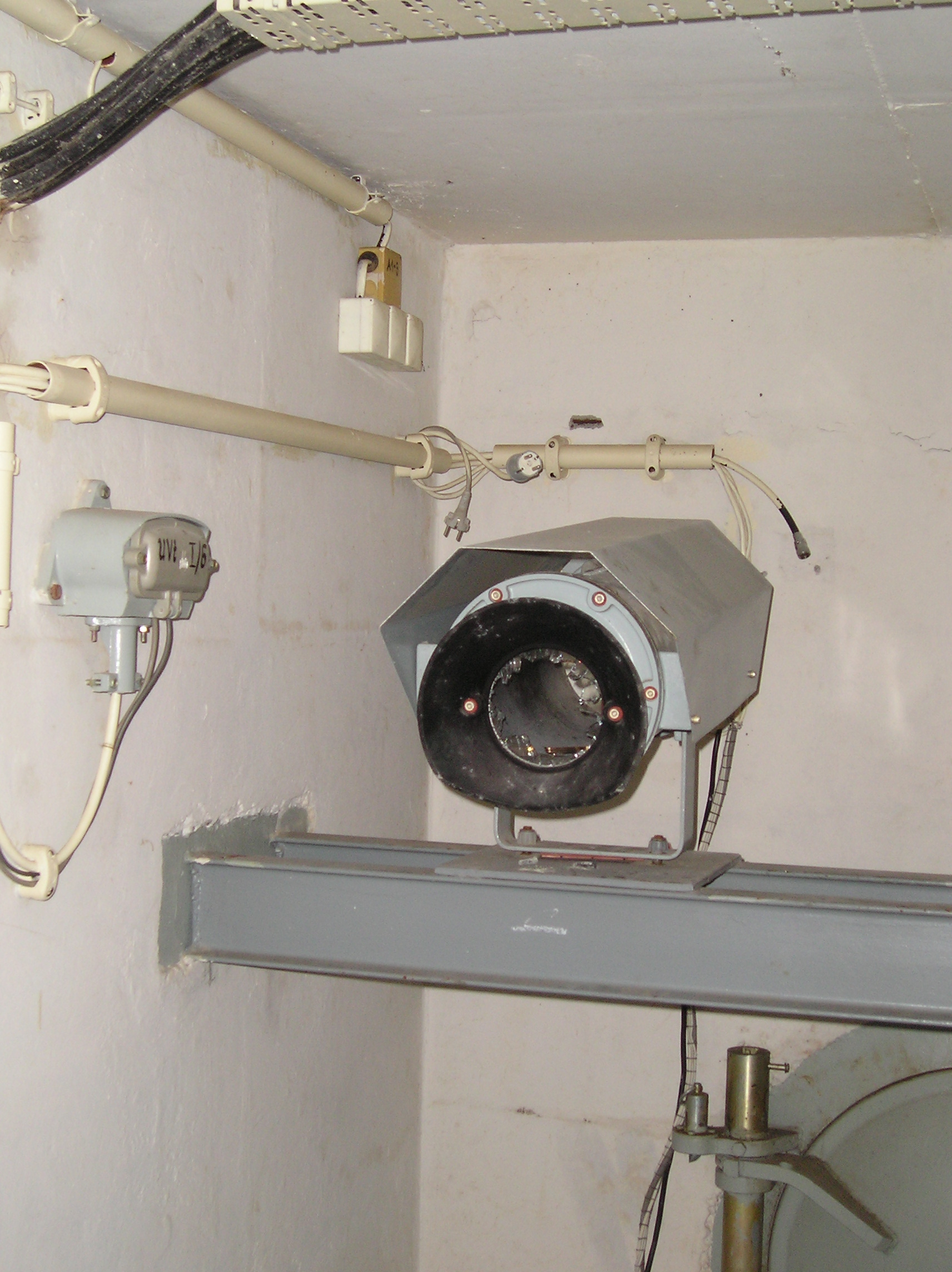

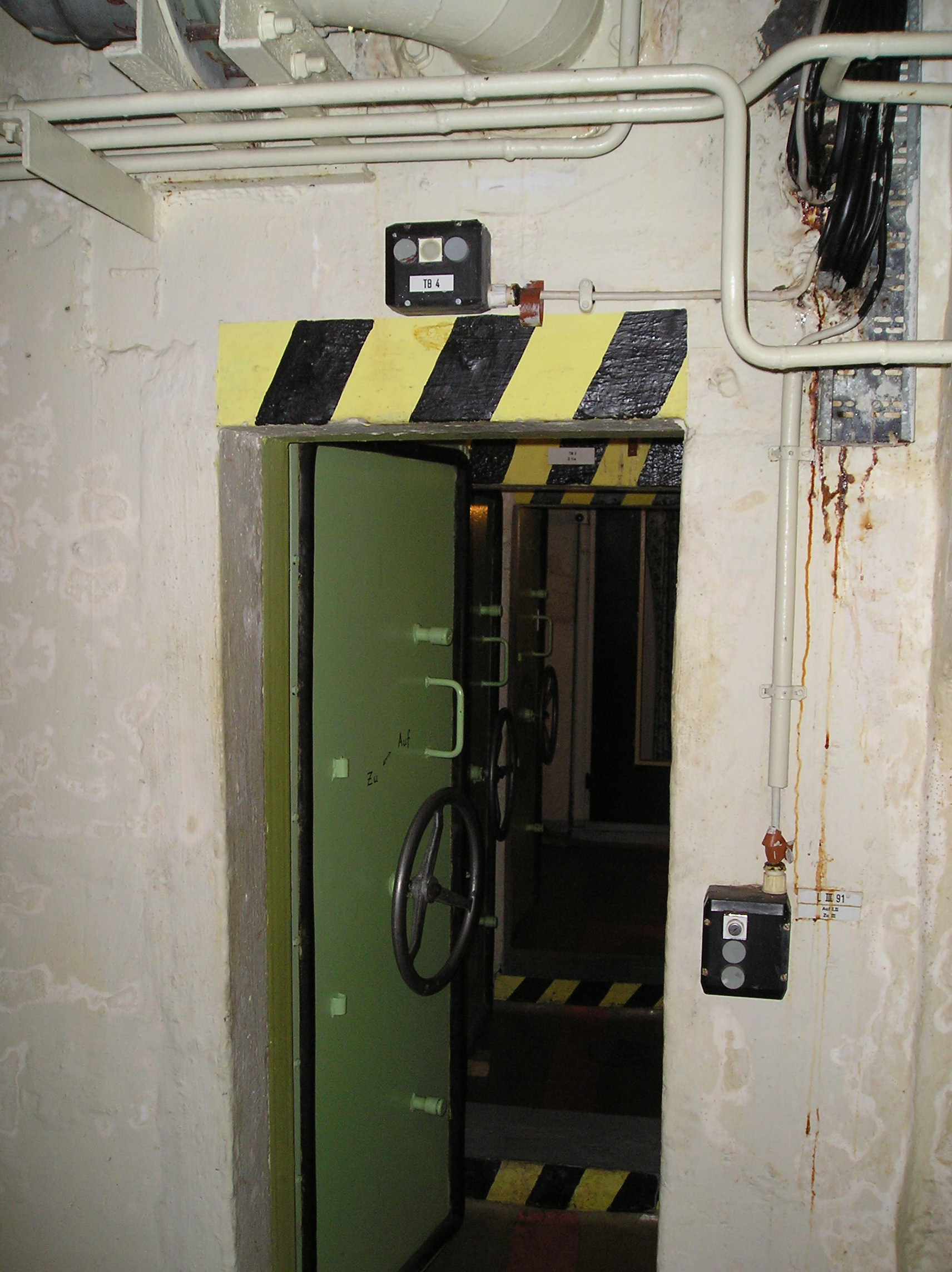

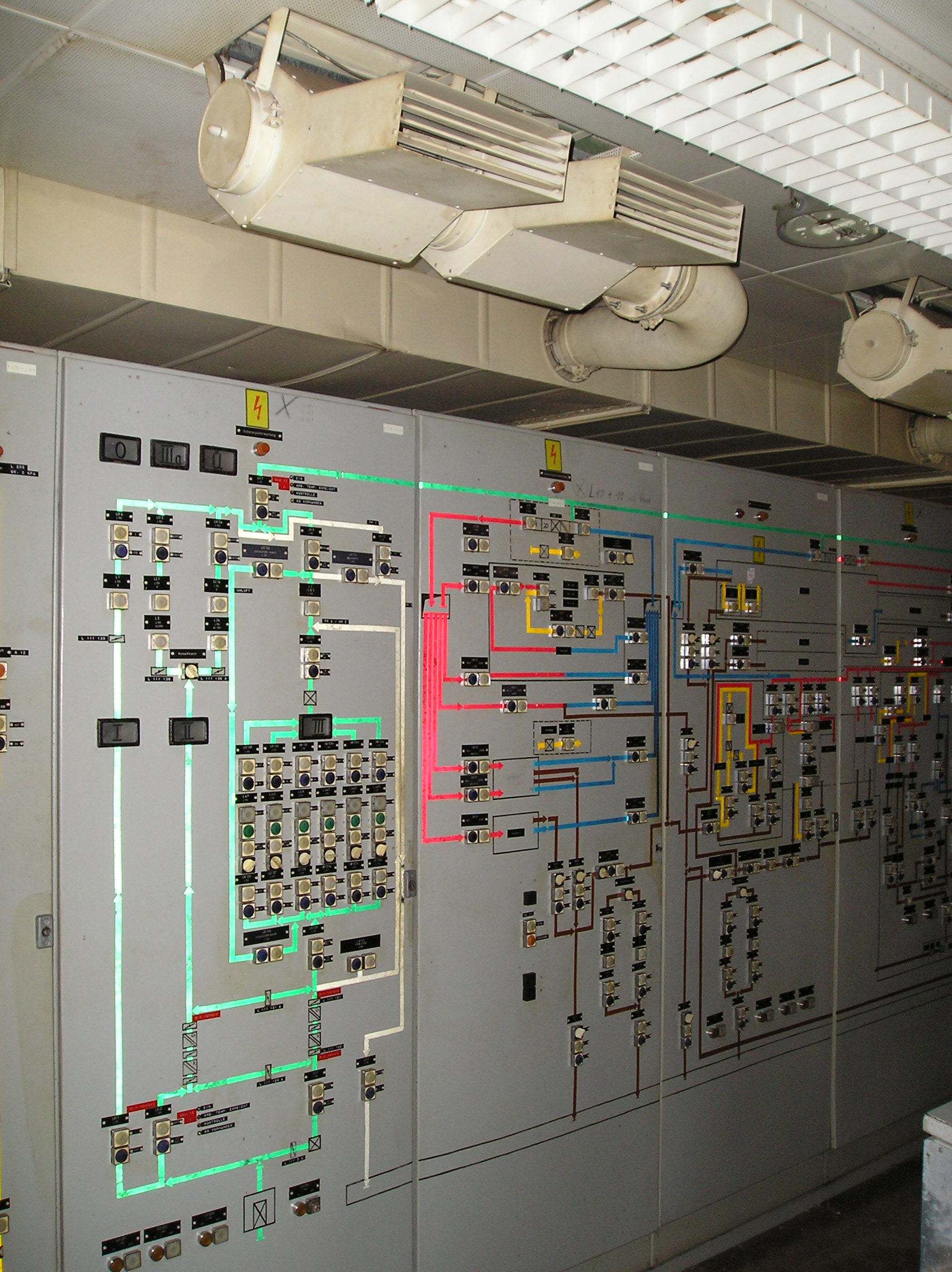

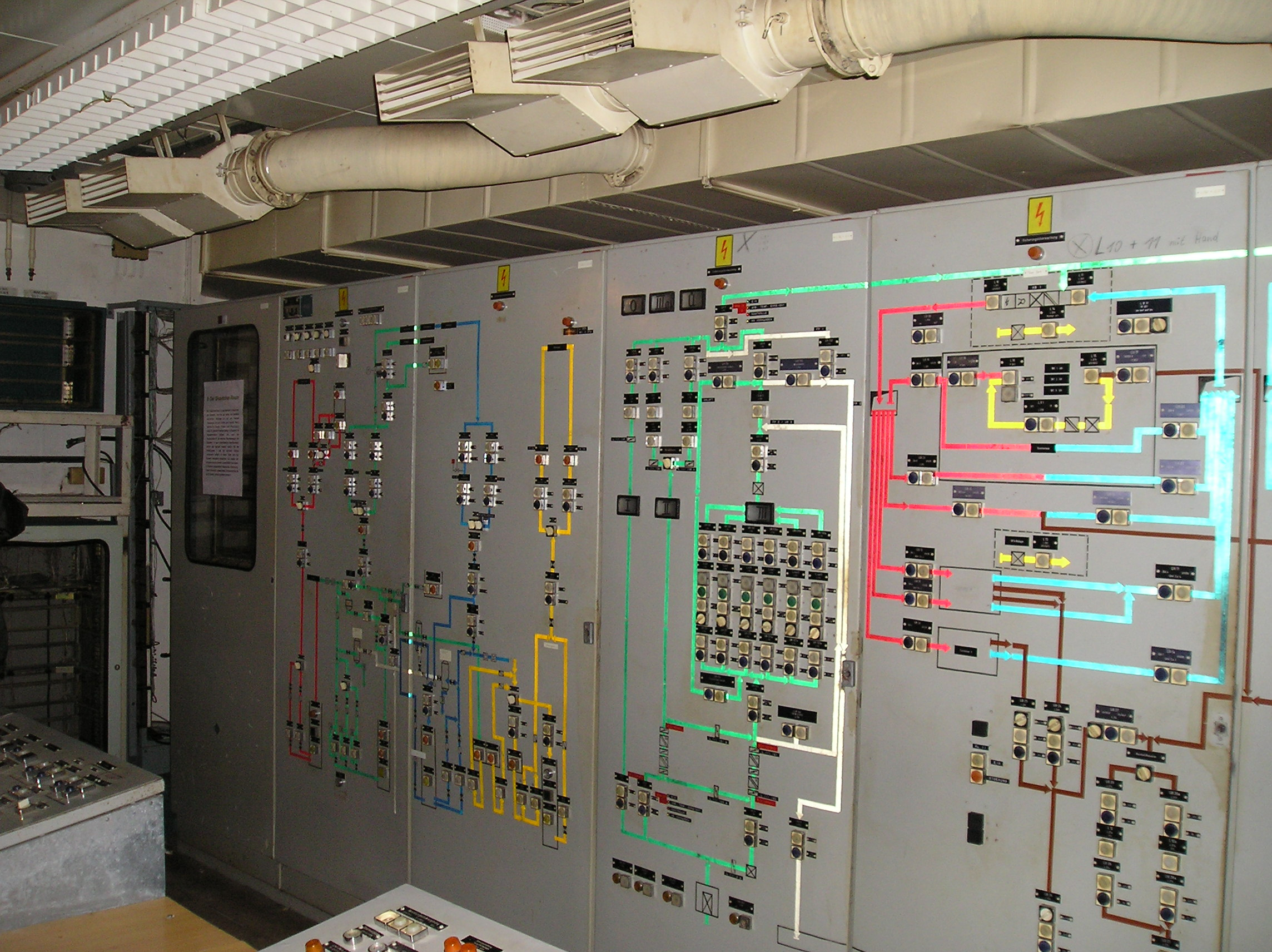

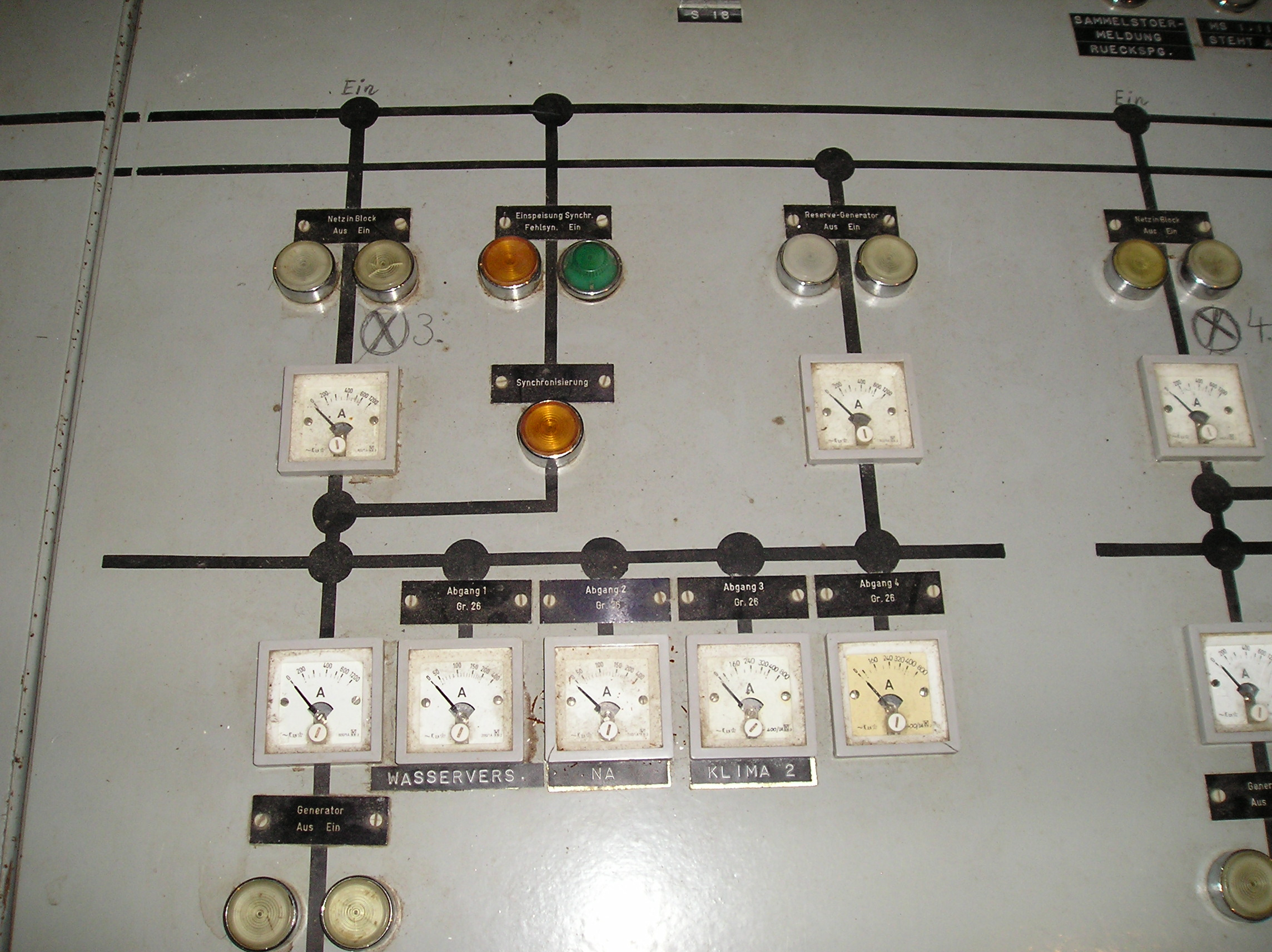

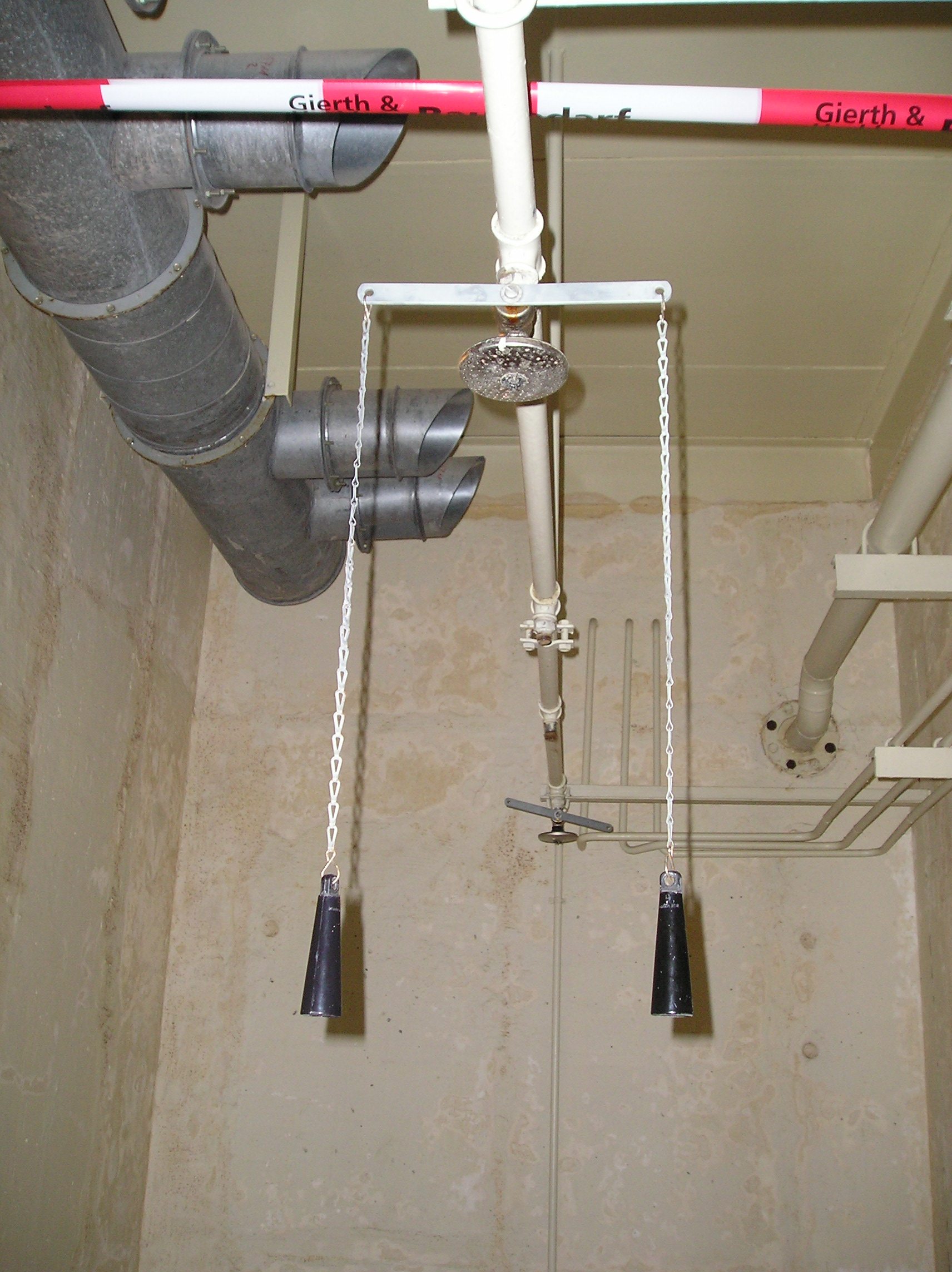

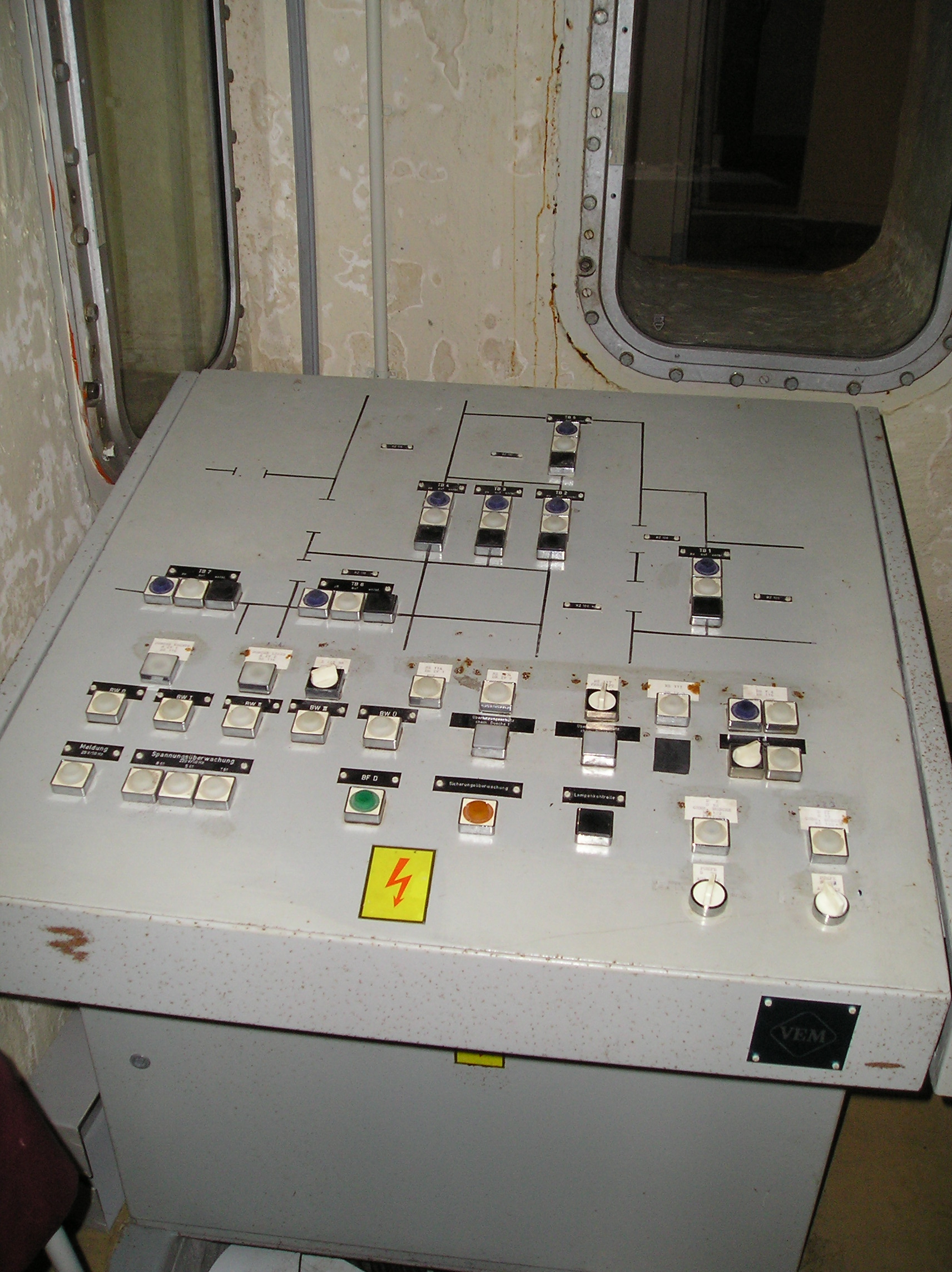

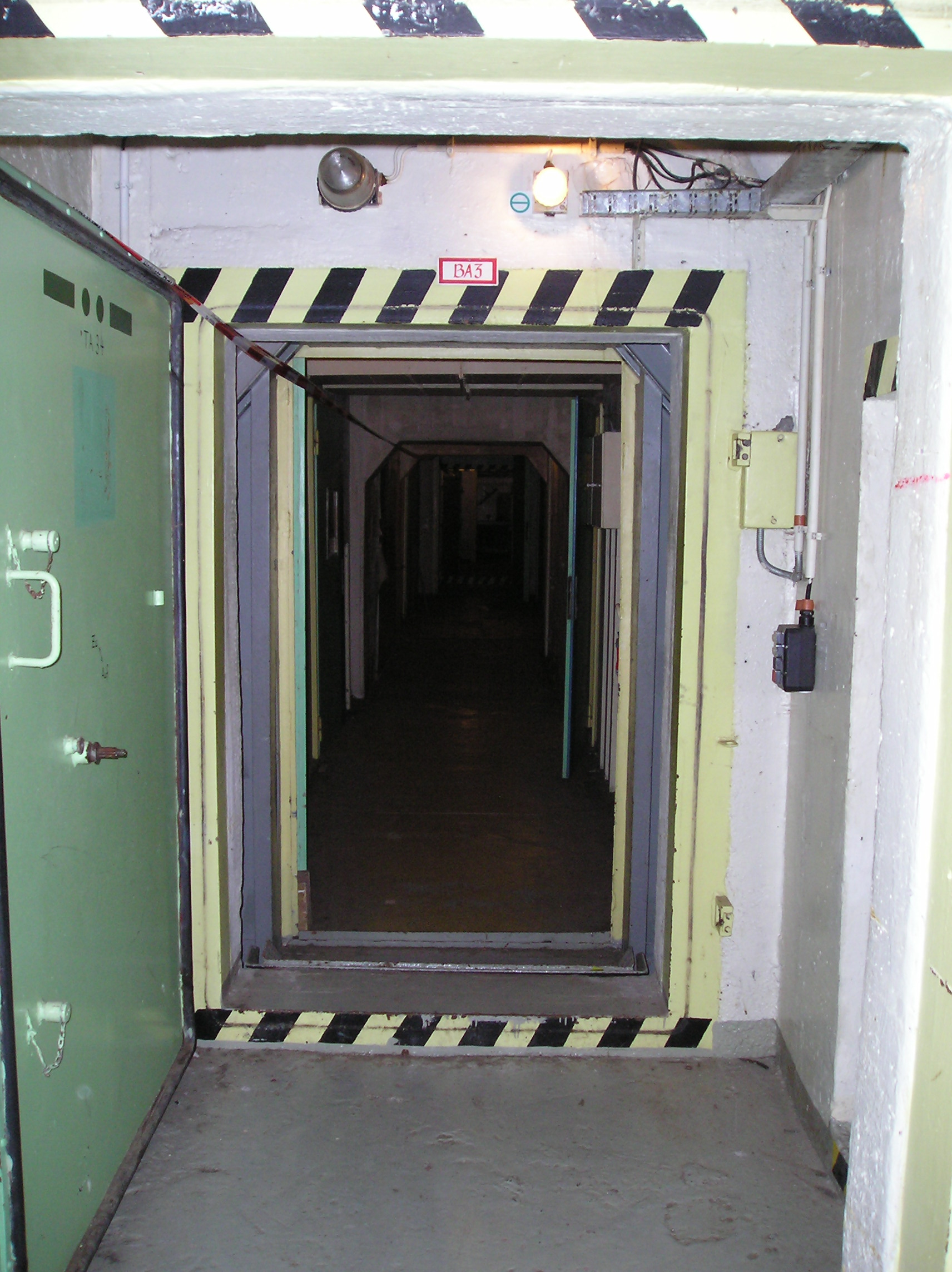

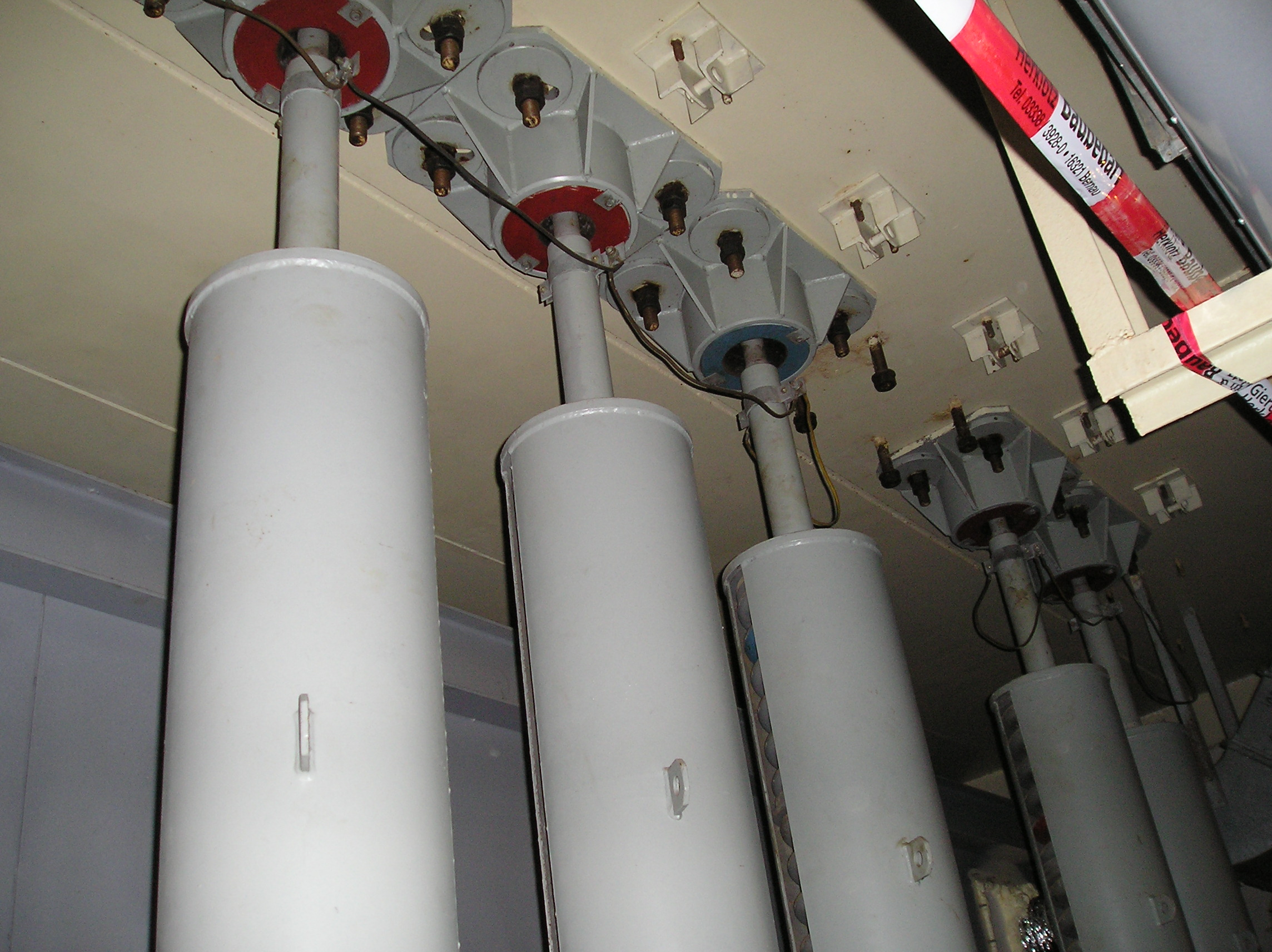

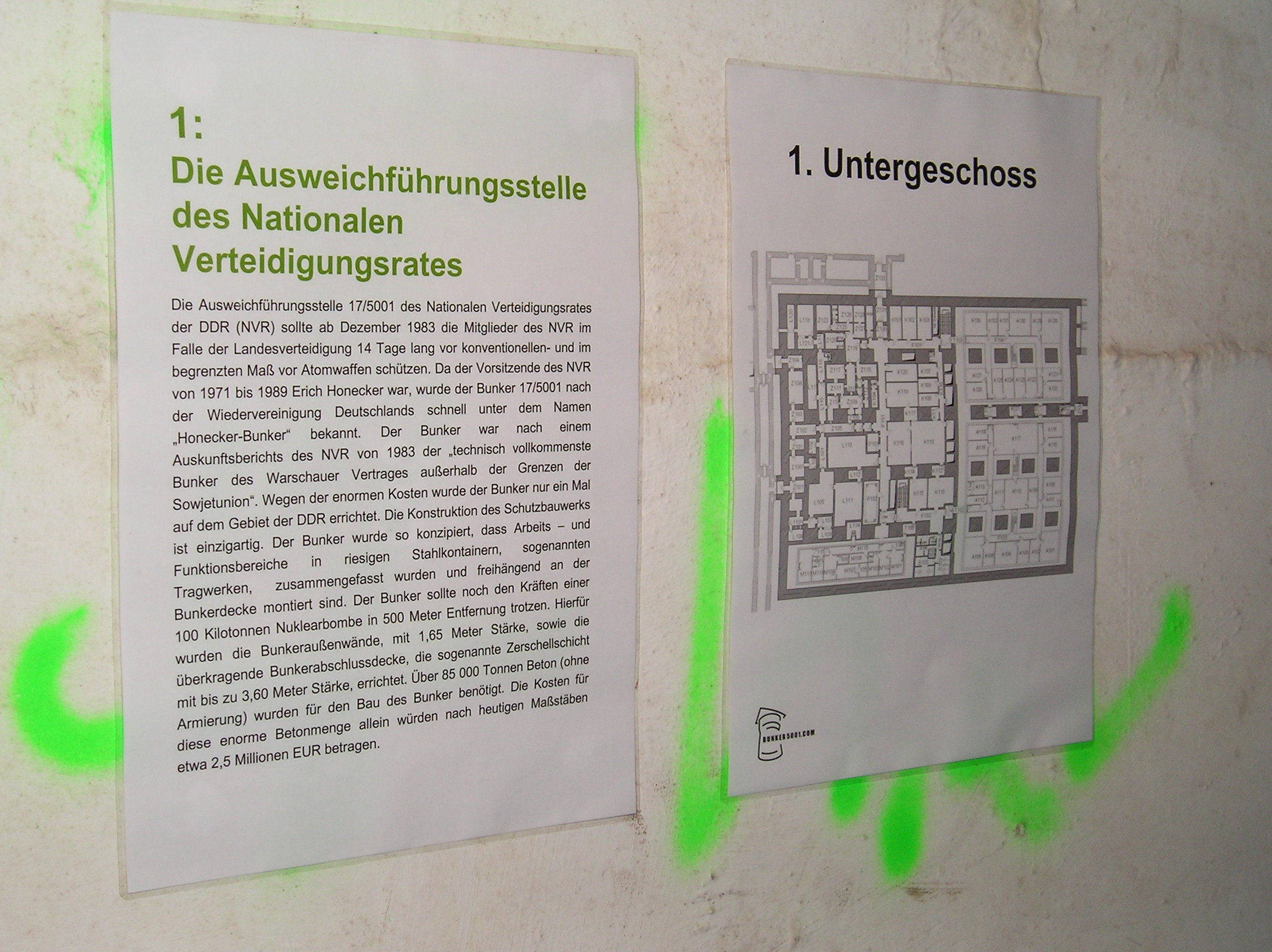

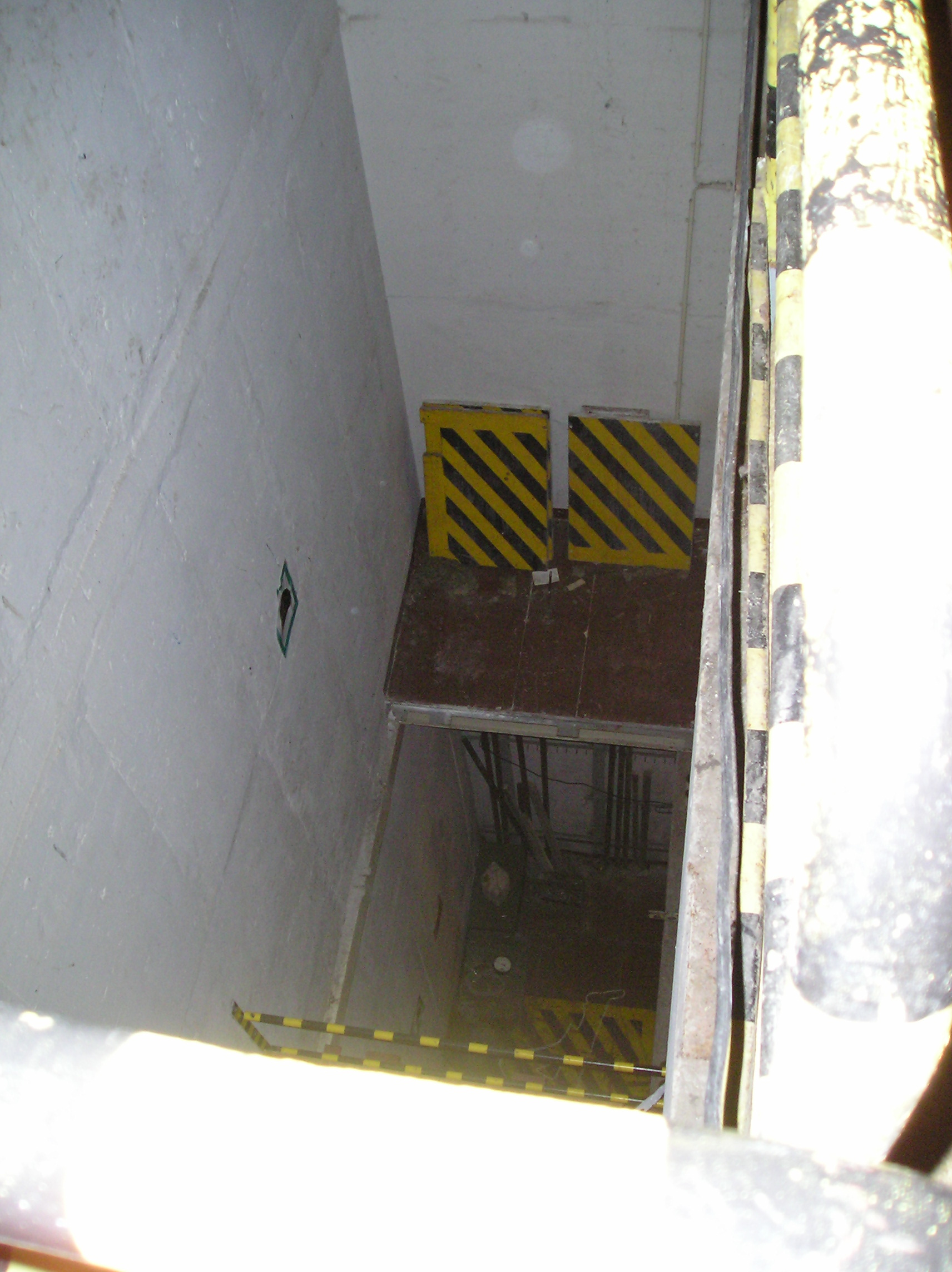

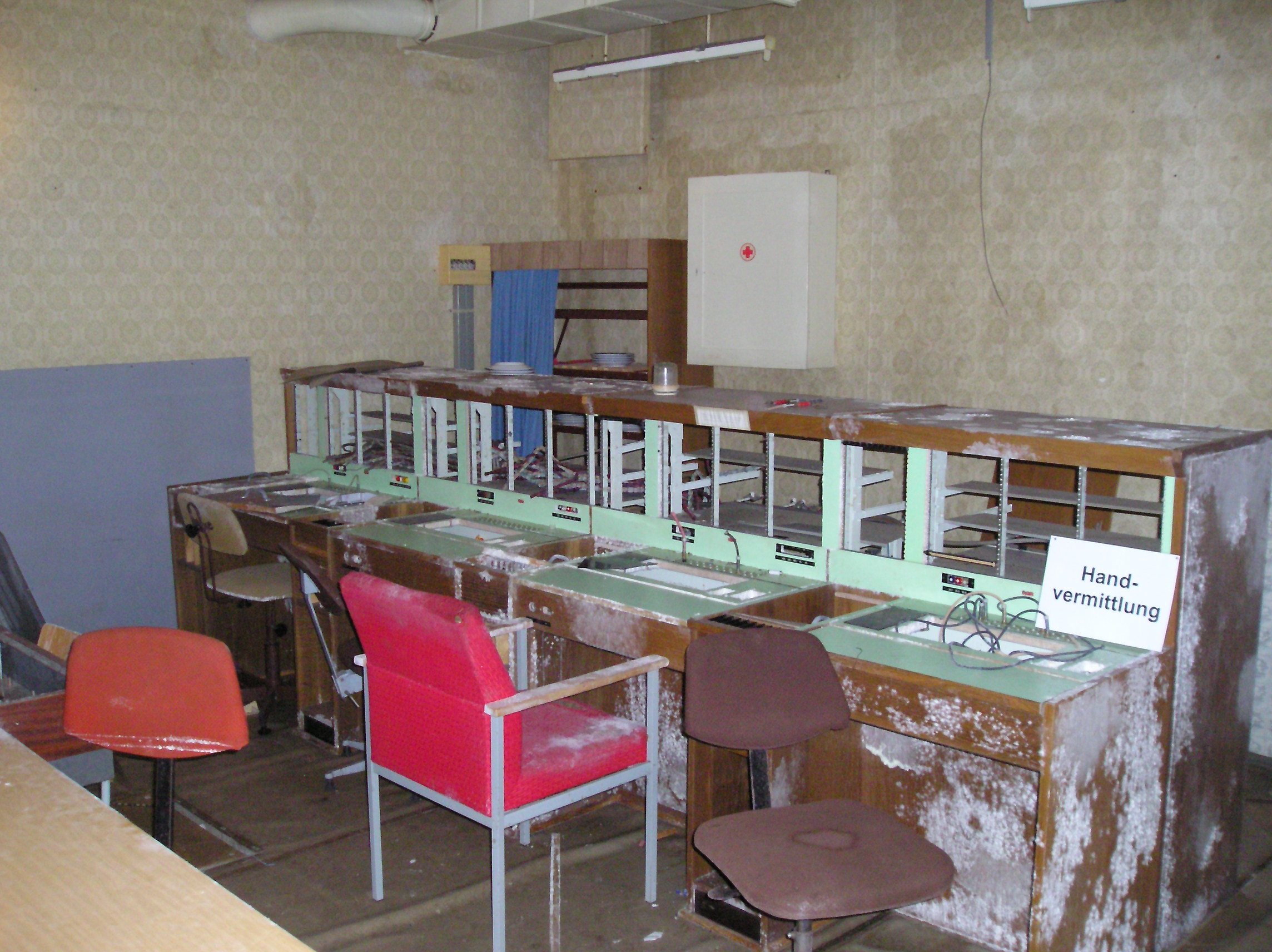

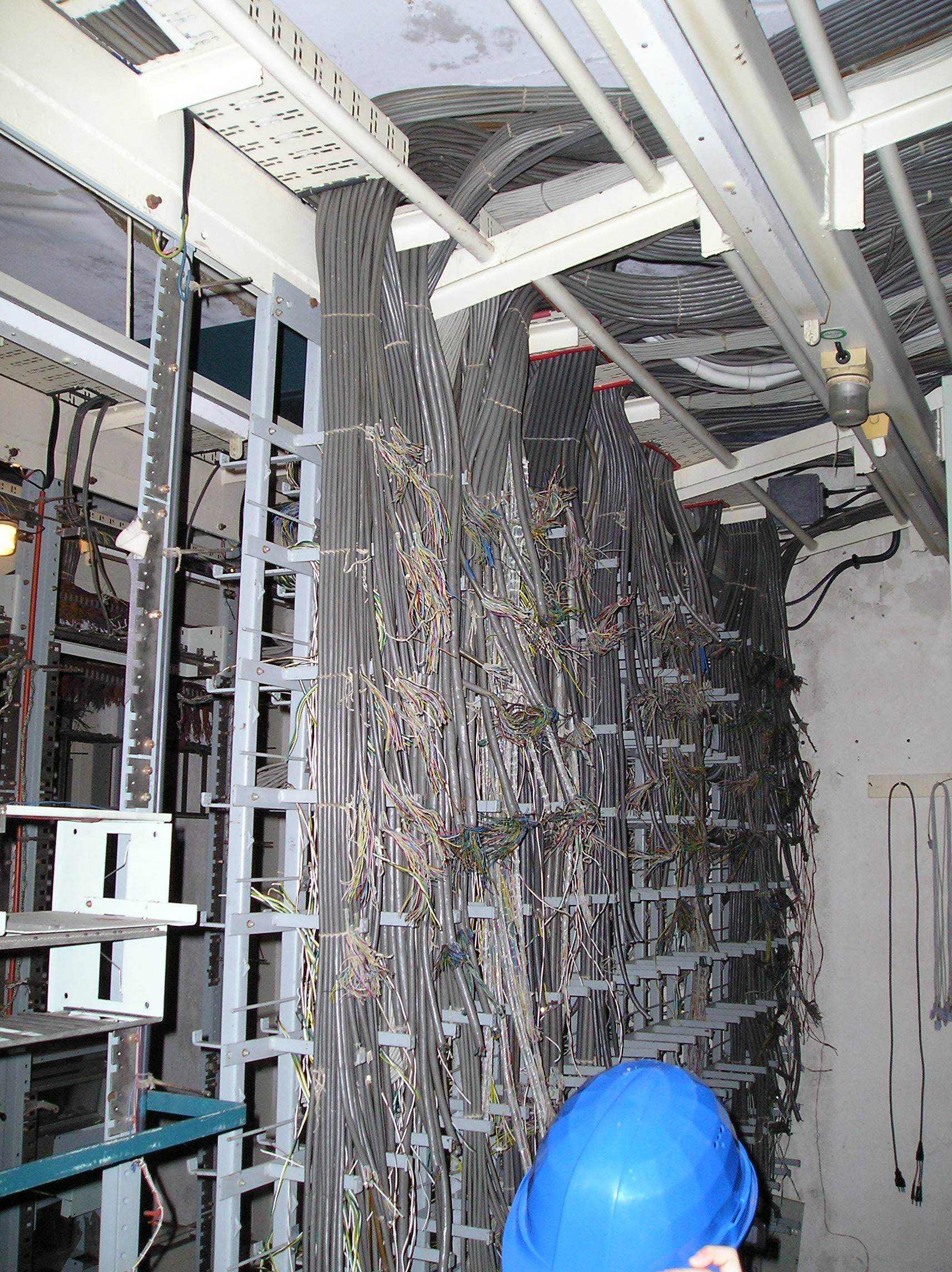

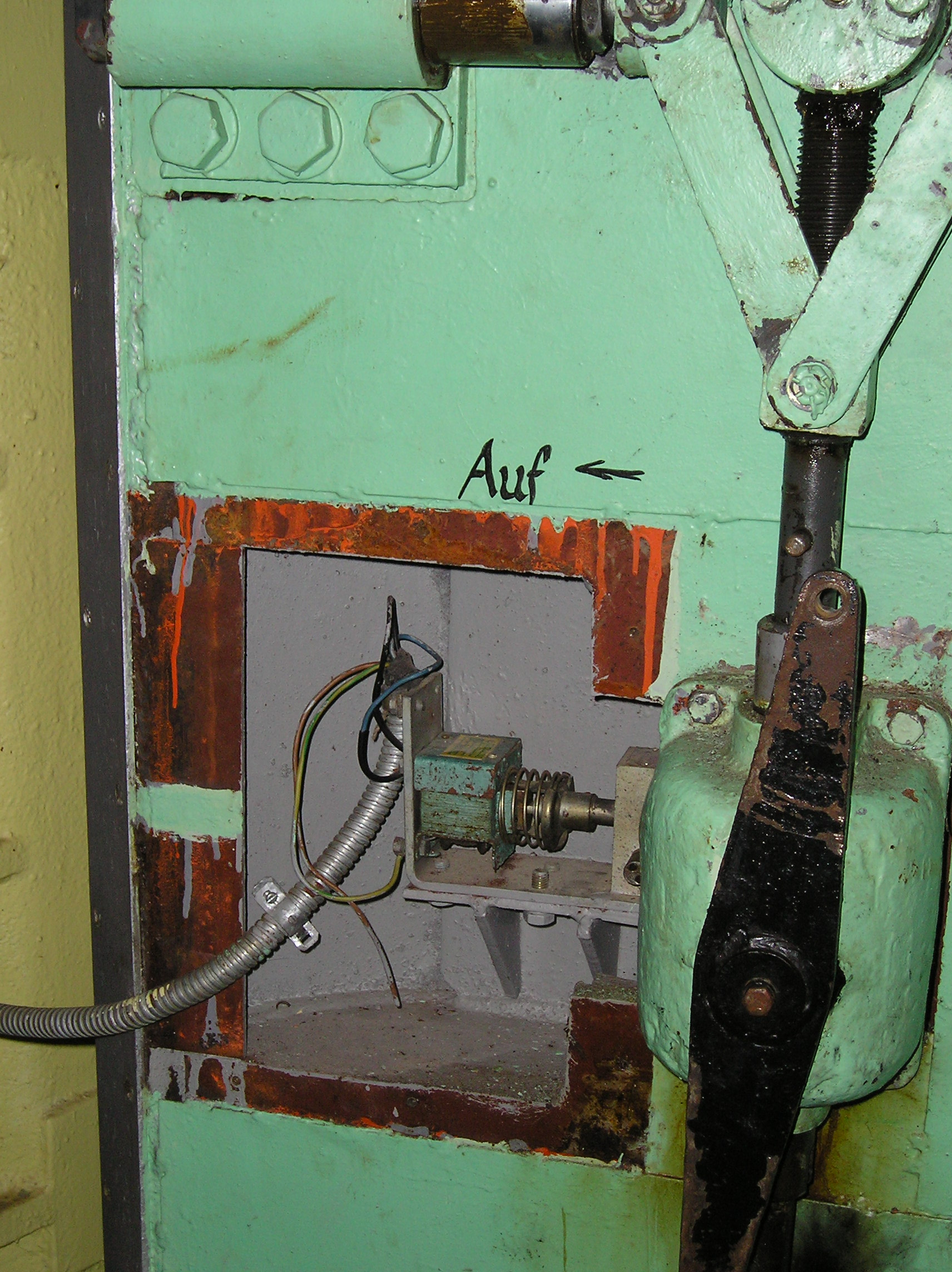

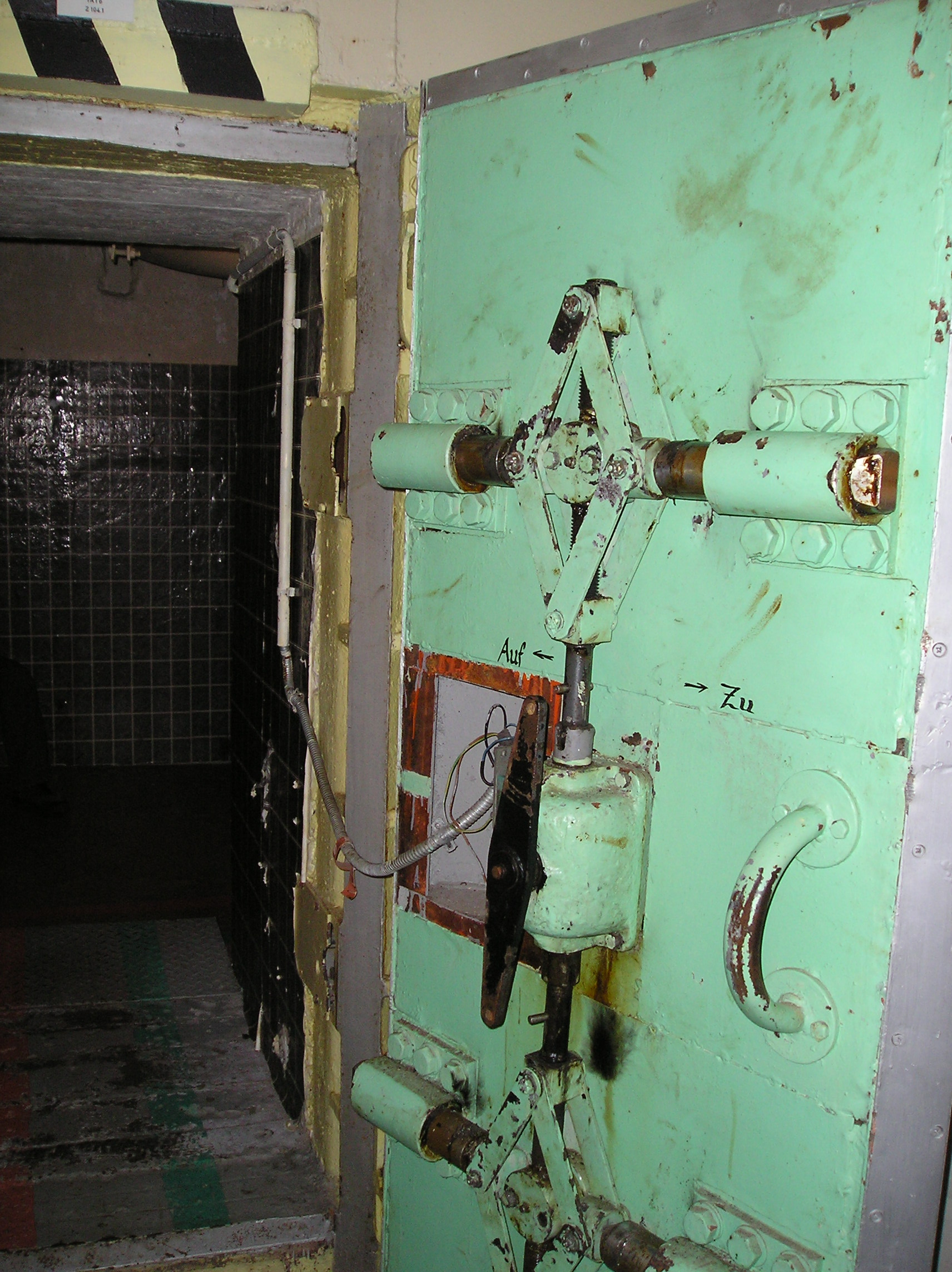

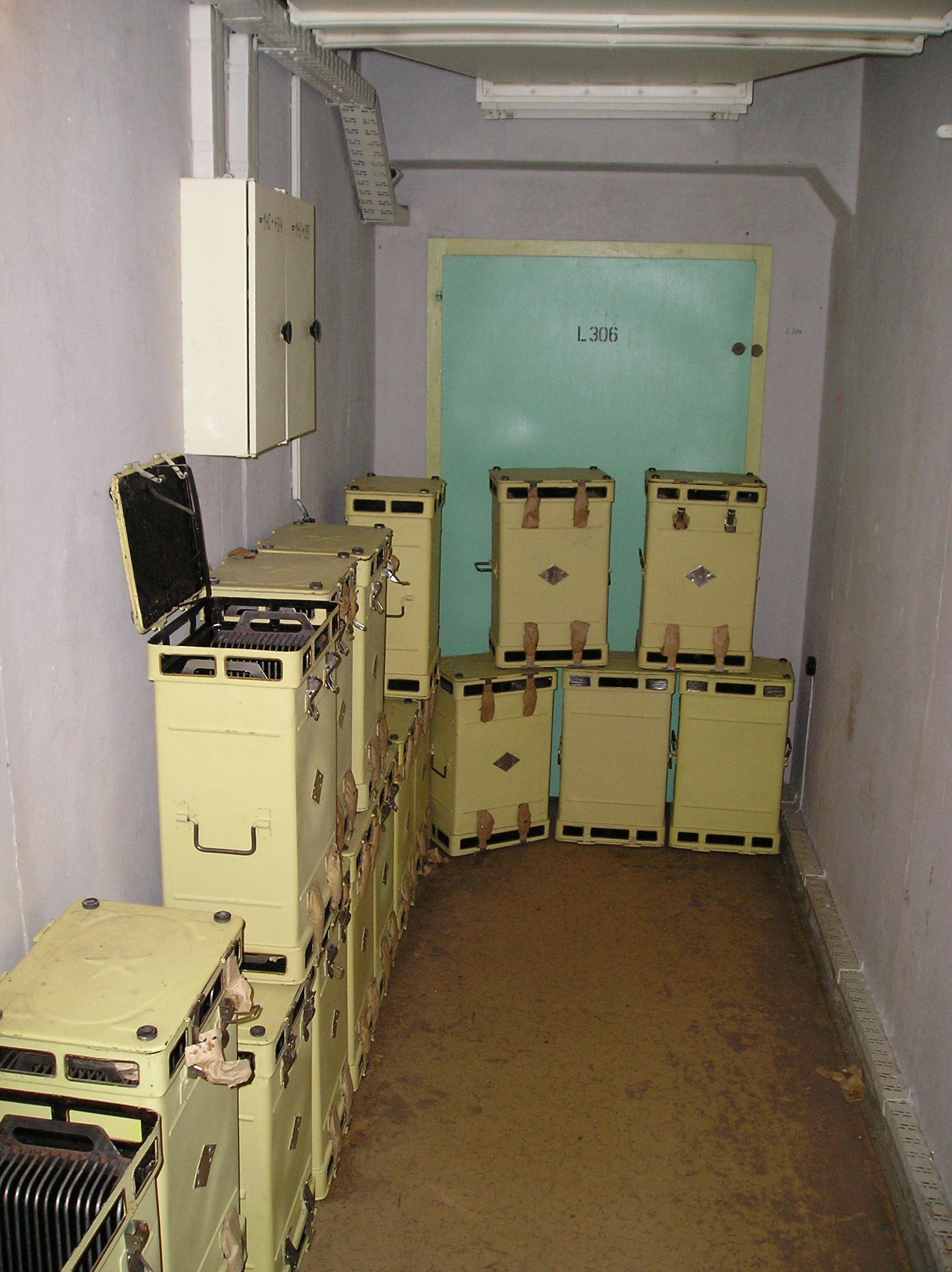

== Members of the NVR (mid-1989) ==
- Erich Honecker (Member of the Politbüro, Chairman of the State Council and General Secretary of the SED), Chairman of the NVR
- Fritz Streletz (Chief of Staff of the National People's Army (NVA)), Secretary of the NVR
- Willi Stoph (Member of the Politbüro, Chairman of the Council of Ministers)
- Heinz Keßler (Member of the Politbüro, Minister of National Defense)
- Erich Mielke (Member of the Politbüro, Minister of State Security)
- Friedrich Dickel (Minister of the Interior)
- Horst Brünner (Director of the Main Political Administration of the NVA)
- Egon Krenz (Member of the Politbüro, a Deputy Chairman of the State Council), SED CC Secretary for Security Questions, etc.
- Alfred Neumann (Member of the Politbüro, First Deputy Chairman of the Council of Ministers)
- Werner Krolikowski (Member of the Politbüro, First Deputy Chairman of the Council of Ministers)
- Horst Sindermann (President of the People's Chamber)
- Günter Mittag (Member of the Politbüro, SED CC Secretary for Economics)
- Werner Felfe (Member of the Politbüro, SED CC Secretary for Agriculture)
- Kurt Hager (Member of the Politbüro, Director of the Ideological Commission of the Politbüro)
- Günther Kleiber (Member of the Politbüro, First Deputy Chairman of the Council of Ministers)
- Wolfgang Herger (Department Head for Security Questions in the SED CC)
- Werner Eberlein (Member of the Politbüro, First Secretary of the SED Regional Directorate Magdeburg)
- Hans Albrecht (First Secretary of the SED Regional Directorate Suhl)

== See also ==
- National Defense Commission of North Korea
