= Hans Albrecht (politician) =

East German politician (1919–2008)

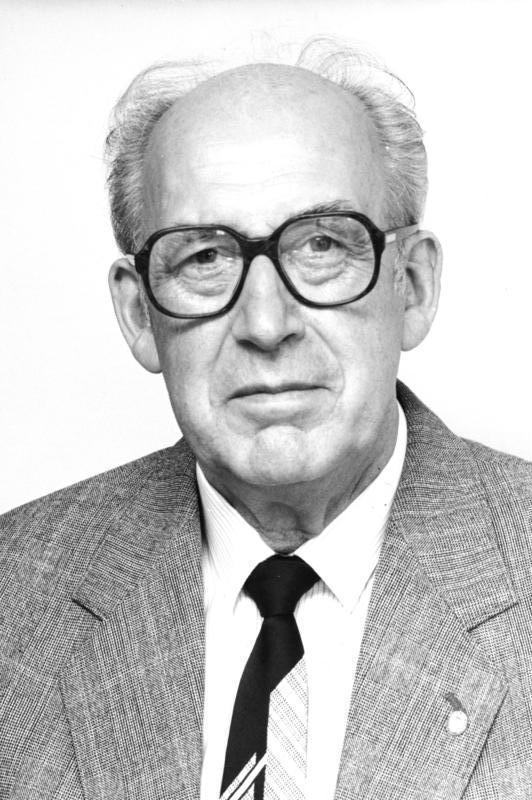
- Albrecht in 1989

First Secretary of the Socialist Unity Party in Bezirk Suhl
- In office 15 August 1968 – 2 November 1989
- Second Secretary: Karl-Heinz Heiliger; Walter Weiss; Gerhard Koszycki
- Preceded by: Otto Funke
- Succeeded by: Peter Pechauf
Volkskammer
Member of the Volkskammer for Bezirk Suhl
In office 16 June 1986 – 16 November 1989
Preceded by	Otto Funke
Succeeded by	Rosel Neuhäuser
Constituency	Bad Salzungen, Hildburghausen, Meiningen, Neuhaus am Rennweg, Sonneberg, №1
In office 26 November 1971 – 16 June 1986
Preceded by	Herbert Recknagel
Succeeded by	Otto Funke
Constituency	Suhl-Stadt, Suhl-Land, Ilmenau, Schmalkalden, №2

Personal details
- Born: Hans Albrecht; 22 November 1919 Bochum, Province of Westphalia, Free State of Prussia, Weimar Republic (now North Rhine-Westphalia, Germany)
- Died: 27 March 2008 (aged 88) Berlin, Germany
- Party: Socialist Unity Party (1946–1989)
- Other political affiliations: Social Democratic Party (1945–1946)
- Education: "Karl Marx" Party Academy; Bergakademie Freiberg (Dipl.-Ing. oec.)
- Occupation: Politician; Party Functionary; Locksmith
- Awards: Patriotic Order of Merit, 1st class; Order of Karl Marx
- Central institution membership: 1963–1989: Full member, Central Committee; 1954–1963: Candidate member, Central Committee; Other offices held: 1972–1989: Member, National Defence Council; 1965–1968: First Deputy Chairman, Workers' and Peasants' Inspection; 1960–1963: Chairman, Council of Bezirk Frankfurt (Oder); 1958–1960: Chairman, Bezirk Frankfurt (Oder) BWR; 1954–1958: First Secretary, Socialist Unity Party in Stalinstadt; 1952–1954: First Secretary, Socialist Unity Party in Eberswalde; 1951–1952: First Secretary, Socialist Unity Party in Frankfurt (Oder)

Hans Albrecht (22 November 1919 – 27 March 2008) was an East German politician and party functionary of the Socialist Unity Party (SED).

Albrecht served as the First Secretary of the SED in Bezirk Suhl for over twenty-one years, becoming known for his particularly authoritarian leadership style. In the Berlin Wall shooting trials, he was sentenced to five years and one month in prison for manslaughter.

== Life and career in East Germany ==
=== Early life and career ===
Hans Albrecht was born in Bochum in the heavily industrialized Ruhr area (then part of the Prussian Province of Westphalia) on 22 November 1919 to a working-class family. A few months after completing his apprenticeship as a locksmith in 1938, he was drafted into the Luftwaffe of the Wehrmacht for the duration of World War II.

After the war, Albrecht settled in Saxony, worked as a heating engineer, and joined the newly reconstituted Social Democratic Party (SPD) in his hometown of Bennewitz. He became a member of the Socialist Unity Party (SED) in 1946 following the SPD's forced merger with the Communist Party of Germany (KPD). He became a full-time party functionary the same year, rising through the ranks of the SED in the district of Grimma in northwest Saxony.

In 1950, he attended a one-year course at the SED's "Karl Marx" Party Academy in Berlin. Subsequently, he served as First Secretary of the SED in Frankfurt (Oder) from 1951 to 1952, Eberswalde from 1952 to 1954 and finally Stalinstadt from 1954 onward. In April of that year (IV. Party Congress), he was elected as a candidate member of the Central Committee of the SED. He held this status until January 1963 (VI. Party Congress), after which he was made a full member.

In 1958, Albrecht was promoted to the regional government of Bezirk Frankfurt (Oder) as chairman of the Bezirk Economic Council, rising to head the Council of Bezirk Frankfurt (Oder) in August 1960, formally making him head of government of the Bezirk. However, he was de facto subservient to the local SED leadership. From March 1963, he was delegated to the Industrial Institute of the Bergakademie Freiberg, which he completed with a degree in industrial engineering (Dipl.-Ing. oec.). Afterwards, he was made first deputy chairman of the Workers' and Peasants' Inspection, succeeding Günter Sieber, who became Minister for Trade and Supply.

=== Bezirk Suhl SED First Secretary ===
On 15 August 1968, he succeeded Otto Funke as First Secretary of the Bezirk Suhl SED leadership, a position he held for 21 years until 1989. Funke officially retired for health reasons. Bezirk Suhl had the smallest population and was the most geographically isolated East German Bezirk.

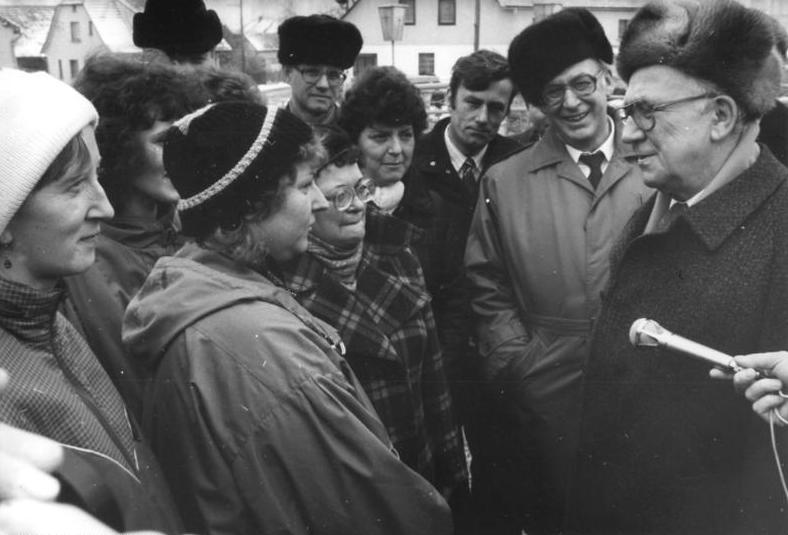
Albrecht (right of center) and Volkskammer President Horst Sindermann (right) visiting farmers in Kaltensundheim in February 1988

He additionally became member of the Volkskammer in 1971, nominally representing constituencies in his Bezirk, first Suhl and its suburbs, then the rural southeast of Bezirk Suhl. In 1972, he was elected to the National Defense Council, likely due to the Bezirk's long western border with West Germany.

Albrecht's twenty-one-year rule over Bezirk Suhl was viewed negatively. His leadership style was authoritarian, occasionally described as dictatorial, and he was viewed as a hardliner. Albrecht has been described as an "Icke-Berliner" with little connection to Bezirk Suhl. He also became known for shuffling local SED functionaries around to make sure none of them would be able to establish a power base and challenge him.

In 1988, he unsuccessfully tried to pressure Bad Salzungen SED First Secretary Hans-Dieter Fritschler to rescind his statements in the book Der Erste. The book provided an unfalsified account of Fritschler's work as a local SED functionary and detailed East Germany's problems, including dysfunction stemming from the Bezirk Suhl SED leadership.

=== Peaceful Revolution ===
Early on during the Peaceful Revolution, on 2 November 1989, the Bezirk Suhl SED removed Albrecht from the position of First Secretary and installed reformer Peter Pechauf as his successor. He was removed by his party from the Volkskammer two weeks later, on 16 November 1989. At its last session on 3 December 1989, the Central Committee expelled Albrecht from the Central Committee and from the SED shortly before its collective resignation.

Shortly after the Peaceful Revolution, Albrecht was arrested for abuse of power and embezzlement. In October 1992, he was sentenced by the Meiningen Regional Court to 22 months in prison for incitement to embezzlement. He did not have to serve the sentence because he had already served more than half of it in pre-trial detention.

=== Reunified Germany ===
After the German reunification, he was indicted in May 1991 as part of the Berlin Wall shooting trials with another arrest warrant. As part of the trials against former members of the National Defense Council of the GDR, he was charged with "complicity in manslaughter" (political responsibility for the fatal shootings at the Berlin Wall) before the Berlin Regional Court. Albrecht's defense repeatedly tried claiming he was unable to stand trial for health reasons.

On 16 September 1993, he was sentenced to four and a half years in prison for incitement to manslaughter. The verdict was changed in the appeal by the Federal Court of Justice on 26 July 1994, to manslaughter as an indirect perpetrator and the sentence was increased to five years and one month. Since Albrecht's defense raised constitutional complaints, he initially remained free.

On 12 November 1996, the Federal Constitutional Court dismissed the constitutional complaints of Albrecht and others, arguing that the killing of refugees was the most serious injustice that precluded the justification of those responsible by East German laws. Albrecht served his sentence in a Berlin prison.

Following his release from prison, Albrecht went into retirement. He died on 27 March 2008 in Berlin at the age of 88.
