= Bezirk Erfurt =

District of Erfurt Bezirk Erfurt
- District (Bezirk) of East Germany
- 1952–1990
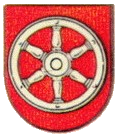
- Flag Coat of arms

- Location of Bezirk Erfurt within the German Democratic Republic
- Capital: Erfurt
- Area
  - 1989: 7,349 km^{2} (2,837 sq mi)
- Population
  - 1989: 1,240,400
- Government
- SED First Secretary
  - 1952–1953: Erich Mückenberger
  - 1953–1957: Hans Kiefert
  - 1957–1958: Hermann Fischer
  - 1958–1980: Alois Bräutigam
  - 1980–1989: Gerhard Müller
  - 1989: Herbert Kroker
- Chairman of the Council of the Bezirk
  - 1952–1962: Willy Gebhardt
  - 1962–1985: Richard Gothe
  - 1985: Horst Lang (acting)
  - 1985–1990: Arthur Swatek
  - 1990: Horst Lang (acting)
  - 1990: Josef Duchač (as Regierungsbevollmächtigter)
- History
  - Established: 1952
  - Disestablished: 1990
Preceded by	Succeeded by
Thuringia	Thuringia
- Today part of: Germany

The Bezirk Erfurt was a district (Bezirk) of East Germany. The administrative seat and the main town was Erfurt.

== History ==
The district was established, along with the other 13, on 25 July 1952, substituting the old German states. After 3 October 1990 it was disestablished following German reunification, becoming again part of the state of Thuringia.

== Geography ==
=== Position ===
The Bezirk Erfurt bordered the Bezirke of Magdeburg, Halle, Gera and Suhl. It also bordered West Germany.

=== Subdivision ===
The Bezirk was divided into 15 Kreise: 2 urban districts (Stadtkreise) and 13 rural districts (Landkreise):

- Urban districts : Erfurt; Weimar.
- Rural districts : Apolda; Arnstadt; Eisenach; Erfurt-Land; Gotha; Heiligenstadt; Langensalza; Mühlhausen; Nordhausen; Sömmerda; Sondershausen; Weimar-Land; Worbis.
