= Neulehrer =

Teachers educated in occupied Germany

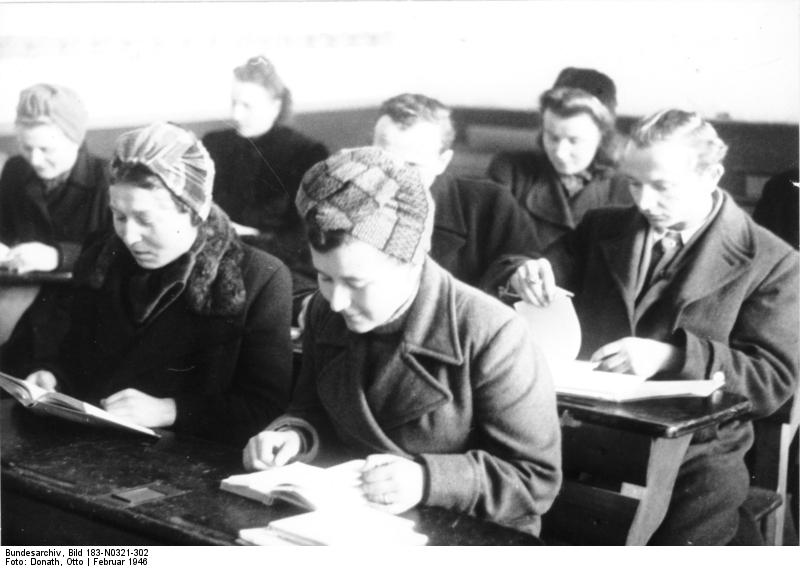
Training of new teachers in the Soviet occupation zone in Berlin-Lichtenberg in 1946

Neulehrer (literally "new teacher") was the name given to educational personnel graduating from a course not integrated in a degree, introduced by the Allies in the four occupation zones of Germany from 1945 to 1949. The Allies' goal was to substitute all teachers influenced by Nazi ideology in German schools and guarantee that German youth would receive a pro-democracy education (reeducation and denazification).

For the recovery of education after the end of the Second World War in Germany, the path to teaching was opened to graduates through short courses, and in the Soviet occupation zone also to young workers.

All persons who could demonstrate having an academic degree were accepted into the program, as long as they had no link with the Nazi Party or with its state organs. The program mainly taught pedagogy as it was known at the time, so that in a few months the students could work as teachers. In the Soviet occupation zone the courses normally lasted 4 to 8 months, often in specially designed schools, where young workers were specially promoted. In the western occupation zones all universities opened pedagogy courses that graduated new teachers in one year or less.

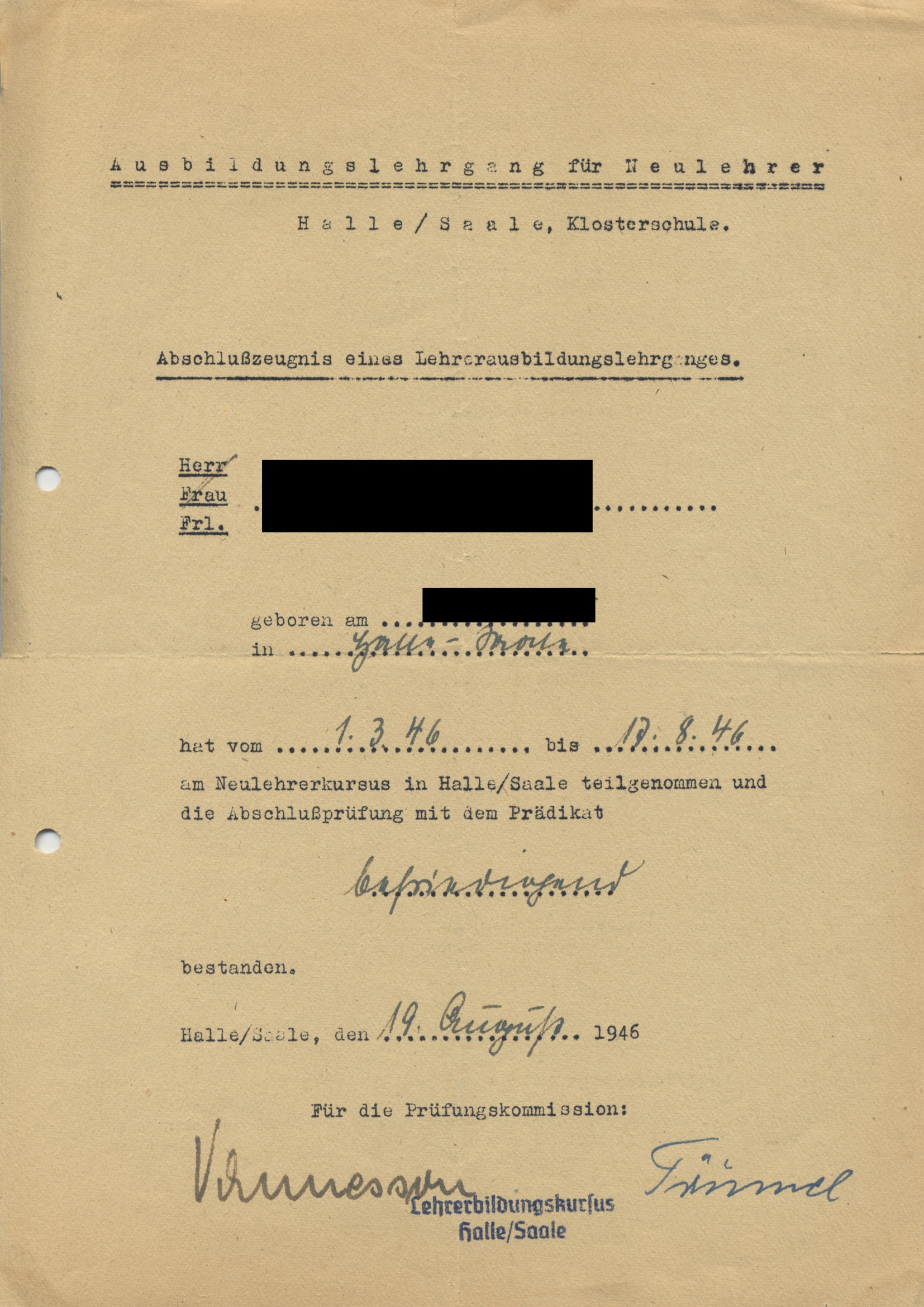
German Democratic Republic course certificate (with hidden name).

Although in the first school year a few teachers with a Nazi past were still tolerated, the directives for their stay in their jobs gradually became more strict. In the western occupation zones starting from 1947 some teachers with Nazi ties could return to teaching after "Entbräunungskursen" (denazification courses), while in the Soviet occupation the programme was so extensive that a large part of the existing teacher corps was replaced with approximately 40,000 new teachers. Although the old teachers questioned the quality of a professional retraining of at maximum one year, thanks to the general academical formation of the new teachers the result was good enough and allowed for a stable job for members of professions that had no other alternatives in post-war Germany. The large majority of the new teachers remained for a long time in their new jobs.

In the Soviet occupation zone the introduction of new teachers also served to guarantee the Socialist Unity Party of Germany (SED) control over school education. In 1949 already 67.8% of teaching positions were filled by new teachers. 47.7% of these teachers belonged to the SED, 13% to the Liberal Democratic Party and 10% to the east German Christian Democratic Union, the later two being bloc parties under SED control. In that way the SED achieved ample control over school education.
