= Bezirk Suhl =

District of East Germany

District of Suhl Bezirk Suhl
- District (Bezirk) of East Germany
- 1952–1990
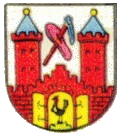
- Flag Coat of arms

- Location of Bezirk Suhl within the German Democratic Republic
- Capital: Suhl
- Area
  - 1989: 3,856 km^{2} (1,489 sq mi)
- Population
  - 1989: 595,200
- Government
- First Secretary of the Socialist Unity Party
  - 1952–1954: Adolf Färber
  - 1954–1956: Kurt Schneidewind
  - 1956–1968: Otto Funke
  - 1968–1989: Hans Albrecht
  - 1989–1990: Peter Pechauf
- Chairman of the Council of the Bezirk
  - 1952–1958: Fritz Sattler
  - 1958–1967: Wilhelm Behnke
  - 1967–1990: Arnold Zimmermann
  - 1990: Helmuth Vierling (acting)
  - 1990: Werner Ulbrich (as Regierungsbevollmächtigter)
- Legislature: Bezirkstag Suhl
- History
  - Established: 1952
  - Disestablished: 1990
Preceded by	Succeeded by
Thuringia	Thuringia
- Today part of: Germany

The Bezirk Suhl was a district (Bezirk) of East Germany. The administrative seat and the main town was Suhl.

== History ==
The district was established, with the other 13, on 25 July 1952, substituting the old German states. After 3 October 1990 it was disestablished as a consequence of the German reunification, becoming again part of the state of Thuringia.

== Geography ==
=== Position ===
The Bezirk Suhl, the westernmost and the smallest of the GDR, bordered with the Bezirke of Erfurt and Gera. It bordered also with West Germany.

=== Subdivision ===
The Bezirk was divided into 9 Kreise: 1 urban district (Stadtkreis) and 8 rural districts (Landkreise):

- Urban district : Suhl.
- Rural districts : Bad Salzungen; Hildburghausen; Ilmenau; Meiningen; Neuhaus; Schmalkalden; Sonneberg; Suhl-Land.
