= List of leaders of administrative divisions of East Germany =

This article lists the leaders of administrative divisions of East Germany, officially the German Democratic Republic (GDR; German: Deutsche Demokratische Republik, DDR). GDR was a country that existed from 1949 to 1990, when the eastern portion of Germany was part of the Eastern Bloc during the Cold War.

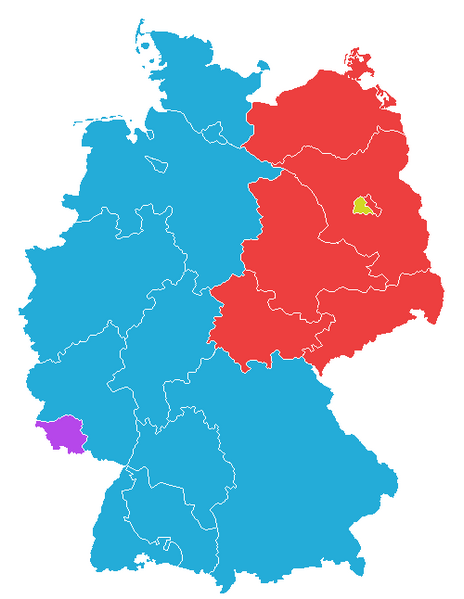
Länder of the GDR, in red.

Until 1952, GDR was divided into 5 states (German: Länder), from north to south: Mecklenburg, Brandenburg, Saxony-Anhalt, Saxony and Thuringia.

Bezirke of the GDR, with their capitals in red.

From 1952 until 1990, GDR was divided into 14 Regions (German: Bezirke), each named after their capitals, from north to south: Rostock, Neubrandenburg, Schwerin, Potsdam, Frankfurt, Magdeburg, Cottbus, Halle, Leipzig, Erfurt, Dresden, Karl-Marx-Stadt (named Chemnitz until the 1953 Karl Marx Year), Gera and Suhl.

Due to its special status, East Berlin (German: Ost-Berlin) was originally not counted as a Bezirk. In 1961, after the Berlin Crisis of 1961 and the construction of the Berlin Wall, East Berlin came to be recognised in GDR administration as the Bezirk Berlin, though it retained a special status until the adoption of the revised 1968 Constitution.

== Officeholders ==
Socialist Unity Party of Germany (SED)
Party of Democratic Socialism (PDS)
Liberal Democratic Party of Germany (LDPD)
German Democratic Party (DDP)
Christian Democratic Union of Germany (CDU)
Social Democratic Party of Germany (SPD)

=== States (Länder) ===
==== Mecklenburg ====
Location of Mecklenburg within the GDR.

Party leaders

No.	Portrait	Name (Birth–Death)	Took office	Left office
First Secretaries of the Socialist Unity Party of Germany (SED)
1		Carl Moltmann (1884–1960)	21 April 1946	9 December 1949
1		Kurt Bürger (1894–1951)	21 April 1946	28 July 1951
2		Karl Mewis (1907–1987)	28 July 1951	1 August 1952

State leaders

No.	Portrait	Name (Birth–Death)	Took office	Left office	Political party
President of the State Administration
1		Wilhelm Höcker (1886–1955)	9 July 1945	31 July 1945	SPD
President
1		Wilhelm Höcker (1886–1955)	31 July 1945	9 December 1946	SPD (until 1946)
		Wilhelm Höcker (1886–1955)	31 July 1945	9 December 1946	SED (until 1946)
Ministers-President
1		Wilhelm Höcker (1886–1955)	9 December 1946	20 July 1951	SED
2		Kurt Bürger (1894–1951)	20 July 1951	28 July 1951†	SED
3		Bernhard Quandt (1903–1999)	24 August 1951	23 July 1952	SED
State Spokesperson (Landessprecher)
–		Martin Brick (born 1939)	3 August 1990	2 October 1990	CDU

==== Brandenburg ====
Location of Brandenburg within the GDR.

Party leader

No.	Portrait	Name (Birth–Death)	Took office	Left office
First Secretary of the Socialist Unity Party of Germany (SED)
1		Willy Sägebrecht (1904–1981)	21 April 1946	23 July 1952
1		Friedrich Ebert Jr. (1894–1979)	21 April 1946	4 December 1948
2		Paul Bismark (1888–1951)	4 December 1948	2 December 1949

State leaders

No.	Portrait	Name (Birth–Death)	Took office	Left office	Political party
President of the Provisional Administration
1		Karl Steinhoff (1892–1981)	4 July 1945	20 December 1946	SPD
Ministers-President
2		Karl Steinhoff (1892–1981)	20 December 1946	5 December 1949	SPD (until 1946)
		Karl Steinhoff (1892–1981)	20 December 1946	5 December 1949	SED (until 1946)
2		Rudolf Jahn (1906–1990)	5 December 1949	23 July 1952	SED
State Spokesperson (Landessprecher)
–		Jochen Wolf (1941–2022)	3 August 1990	2 October 1990	SPD

==== Saxony-Anhalt ====
Location of Saxony-Anhalt within the GDR.

Party leaders

No.	Portrait	Name (Birth–Death)	Took office	Left office
First Secretary of the Socialist Unity Party of Germany (SED)
1		Bernard Koenen (1889–1964)	7 April 1946	1 August 1952
1		Bruno Böttge (1891–1967)	7 April 1946	4 December 1948
2		Werner Bruschke (1898–1995)	4 December 1948	1949

State leaders

No.	Portrait	Name (Birth–Death)	Took office	Left office	Political party
Ministers-President
1		Erhard Hübener (1881–1952)	20 July 1945	13 August 1949	LDPD
2		Werner Bruschke (1898–1995)	13 August 1949	23 July 1952	SED
State Spokesperson (Landessprecher)
–		Karl-Hermann Steinberg (1941–2021)	3 August 1990	2 October 1990	CDU

==== Saxony ====
Location of Saxony within the GDR.

Party leaders

No.	Portrait	Name (Birth–Death)	Took office	Left office
First Secretaries of the Socialist Unity Party of Germany (SED)
1		Wilhelm Koenen (1886–1963)	21 April 1946	4 December 1948
2		Otto Buchwitz (1879–1964)	21 April 1946	4 December 1948
3		Erich Mückenberger (1910–1998)	4 December 1948	9 December 1949
4		Ernst Lohagen (1897–1971)	4 December 1948	27 June 1952
5		Karl Schirdewan (1907–1998)	27 June 1952	26 July 1952

State leaders

No.	Portrait	Name (Birth–Death)	Took office	Left office	Political party
Ministers-President
1		Rudolf Friedrichs (1892–1947)	1 July 1945	13 June 1947†	SPD (until 1946)
		Rudolf Friedrichs (1892–1947)	1 July 1945	13 June 1947†	SED (until 1946)
2		Max Seydewitz (1892–1987)	31 July 1947	23 July 1952	SED
State Spokesperson (Landessprecher)
–		Rudolf Krause	3 August 1990	2 October 1990	CDU

==== Thuringia ====
Location of Thuringia within the GDR.

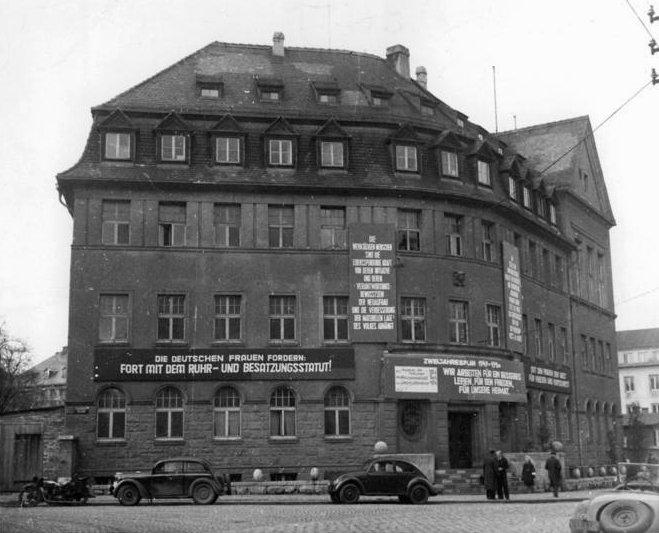
Thuringia SED building

Party leaders

No.	Portrait	Name (Birth–Death)	Took office	Left office
First Secretaries of the Socialist Unity Party of Germany (SED)
1		Heinrich Hoffmann (1899–1979)	7 April 1946	16 December 1949
1		Werner Eggerath (1900–1977)	7 April 1946	6 September 1947
2		Erich Kops (1905–1961)	6 September 1947	16 December 1949
3		Erich Mückenberger (1910–1998)	16 December 1949	26 July 1952

State leaders

No.	Portrait	Name (Birth–Death)	Took office	Left office	Political party
Leader of the State Administration
1		Rudolf Paul (1893–1978)	16 July 1945	4 December 1946	DDP (until 1946)
		Rudolf Paul (1893–1978)	16 July 1945	4 December 1946	SED (until 1946)
Ministers-President
1		Rudolf Paul (1893–1978)	4 December 1946	1 September 1947	SED
2		Werner Eggerath (1900–1977) (Note: Acting to 8 October 1947.)	2 September 1947	23 July 1952	SED
State Spokesperson (Landessprecher)
–		Josef Duchač (born 1938)	3 August 1990	2 October 1990	CDU

=== Regions (Bezirke) ===
==== Rostock ====
Location of Bezirk Rostock within the GDR.

Party leaders

No.	Portrait	Name (Birth–Death)	Took office	Left office
First Secretaries of the Socialist Unity Party of Germany (SED)
1		Karl Mewis (1907–1987)	1 August 1952	21 July 1961 (promoted to Chairman of the State Planning Commission)
2		Harry Tisch (1927–1995)	21 July 1961	29 April 1975 (transferred to Free German Trade Union Federation)
3		Ernst Timm (1926–2005)	29 April 1975	12 November 1989 (deposed)
4		Ulrich Peck (born 1948)	12 November 1989	January 1990

Government leaders

No.	Portrait	Name (Birth–Death)	Took office	Left office	Political party
Chairman of the Bezirk Commission
1		Erhard Holweger (1911–1976)	1952	1952	SED
Chairmen of the Bezirk Council
1		Erhard Holweger (1911–1976)	August 1952	6 August 1952	SED
2		Hans Warnke (1896–1984)	August 1952	May 1959	SED
3		Harry Tisch (1927–1995)	May 1959	July 1961	SED
4		Karl Deuscher (1917–1993)	July 1961	June 1969	SED
5		Willy Marlow (1928–2007)	June 1969	February 1986	SED
6		Eberhard Kühl (born 1936)	February 1986	December 1989	SED
7		Götz Kreuzer (born 1940)	December 1989	1990	SED
Government Commissioner (Regierungsbevollmächtigter)
1		Hans-Joachim Kalendrusch (born 1939)	June 1990	2 October 1990	CDU

==== Neubrandenburg ====
Location of Bezirk Neubrandenburg within the GDR.

Party leaders

No.	Portrait	Name (Birth–Death)	Took office	Left office
First Secretaries of the Socialist Unity Party of Germany (SED)
1		Willi Wiebershausen (1917–1960)	September 1952	August 1953
2		Max Steffen (1909–1988)	September 1953	October 1960 (deposed and demoted)
3		Georg Ewald (1926–1973)	October 1960	16 February 1963 (transferred to Council of Ministers)
4		Johannes Chemnitzer (1929–2021)	16 February 1963	14 November 1989 (deposed)
5		Wolfgang Herrmann (born 1939)	14 November 1989	11 December 1989
6		Jürgen Zelm (born 1953)	11 December 1989	3 March 1990

Government leaders

No.	Portrait	Name (Birth–Death)	Took office	Left office	Political party
Chairman of the Bezirk Commission
1		Wilhelm Steudte (1897–1973)	1952	1952	SED
Chairmen of the Bezirk Council
1		Wilhelm Steudte (1897–1973)	August 1952	December 1953	SED
2		Hans Jendretzky (1897–1992)	December 1953	February 1957	SED
3		Horst Brasch (1922–1989)	1957	May 1959	SED
4		Kurt Guter (1921–2001)	May 1959	July 1962	SED
5		Lothar Geissler (born 1927)	July 1962	February 1967	SED
6		Adolf Garling (1925–2022)	February 1967	March 1972	SED
7		Gottfried Sperling (1921–1991)	April 1972	November 1977	SED
8		Heinz Simkowski (1931–2008)	November 1977	January 1990	SED
—		Wolfgang Otto (born 1947); Acting Chairman	January 1990	June 1990	SED
Government Commissioner (Regierungsbevollmächtigter)
1		Martin Brick (born 1939)	June 1990	2 October 1990	CDU

==== Schwerin ====
Location of Bezirk Schwerin within the GDR.

Party leaders

No.	Portrait	Name (Birth–Death)	Took office	Left office
First Secretaries of the Socialist Unity Party of Germany (SED)
1		Bernhard Quandt (1903–1999)	1 August 1952	28 January 1974 (deposed and demoted to Committee of Antifascist Resistance Fighters)
2		Heinz Ziegner (1928–2015)	28 January 1974	3 November 1989 (deposed)
3		Hans-Jürgen Audehm (born 1940)	3 November 1989	December 1989

Government leaders

No.	Portrait	Name (Birth–Death)	Took office	Left office	Political party
Chairman of the Bezirk Commission
1		Wilhelm Bick (1903–1980)	1952	1952	SED
Chairmen of the Bezirk Council
1		Wilhelm Bick (1903–1980)	August 1952	June 1958	SED
2		Josef Stadler (1906–1984)	June 1958	July 1960	SED
3		Michael Grieb (1921–2003)	July 1960	April 1968	SED
4		Rudi Fleck (1930–2012)	April 1968	8 December 1989	SED
—		Siegfried Hempelt (born 1931); Acting Chairman	December 1989	June 1990	SED
Government Commissioner (Regierungsbevollmächtigter)
1		Georg Diederich (born 1949)	June 1990	2 October 1990	CDU

==== Potsdam ====
Location of Bezirk Potsdam within the GDR.

Party leaders

No.	Portrait	Name (Birth–Death)	Took office	Left office
First Secretaries of the Socialist Unity Party of Germany (SED)
1		Kurt Seibt (1908–2002)	1 August 1952	April 1956 (transferred to study at the CPSU Higher Party School "W. I. Lenin")
—		Eduard Götzl (1921–1986); Acting	April 1956	September 1957 (resumed his role as secretary for economic affairs)
(1)		Kurt Seibt (1908–2002)	September 1957	3 June 1964 (transferred to Council of Ministers)
2		Werner Wittig (1926–1976)	3 June 1964	8 January 1976†
3		Günther Jahn (1930–2015)	23 January 1976	15 November 1989 (resigned)
4		Heinz Vietze (born 1947)	15 November 1989	February 1990

Government leaders

No.	Portrait	Name (Birth–Death)	Took office	Left office	Political party
Chairman of the Bezirk Commission
1		Curt Wach (1906–1974)	1 August 1952	8 August 1952	SED
Chairmen of the Bezirk Council
1		Curt Wach (1906–1974)	8 August 1952	January 1953	SED
2		Josef Stadler (1906–1984)	April 1953	February 1957	SED
3		Herbert Rutschke (1905–1978)	February 1957	June 1960	SED
4		Franz Peplinski (1910–1991)	June 1960	December 1962	SED
5		Herbert Puchert (1914–1997)	January 1963	May 1971	SED
6		Günter Pappenheim (1925–2021)	May 1971	February 1974	SED
7		Werner Eidner (born 1923)	February 1974	June 1977	SED
8		Herbert Tzschoppe (1927–2023)	June 1977	June 1990	SED
Government Commissioner (Regierungsbevollmächtigter)
1		Jochen Wolf (1941–2022)	June 1990	2 October 1990	SPD

==== Frankfurt ====
Location of Bezirk Frankfurt within the GDR.

Party leaders

No.	Portrait	Name (Birth–Death)	Took office	Left office
First Secretaries of the Socialist Unity Party of Germany (SED)
1		Gerhard Grüneberg (1921–1981)	1 August 1952	February 1958 (promoted to Central Committee Secretariat)
2		Eduard Götzl (1921–1986)	April 1958	2 August 1961 (deposed and demoted)
3		Erich Mückenberger (1910–1996)	2 August 1961	22 May 1971 (transferred to Central Party Control Commission)
4		Hans-Joachim Hertwig (1928–1988)	22 May 1971	28 August 1988†
5		Christa Zellmer (1930–2002)	3 November 1988	11 November 1989 (resigned)
6		Bernd Meier (1944–2005)	15 November 1989	February 1990

Government leaders

No.	Portrait	Name (Birth–Death)	Took office	Left office	Political party
Chairman of the Bezirk Commission
1		Franz Peplinski (1910–1991)	1 August 1952	8 August 1952	SED
Chairmen of the Bezirk Council
1		Franz Peplinski (1910–1991)	8 August 1952	September 1956	SED
2		Günter Springer (1922–2013)	November 1956	June 1960	SED
3		Hans Albrecht (1919–2008)	August 1960	March 1963	SED
4		Harry Mönch (born 1925)	March 1963	May 1969	SED
5		Siegfried Sommer (1925–2003)	May 1969	November 1989	SED
6		Gundolf Baust (1941–2004)	20 November 1989	June 1990	SED
Government Commissioner (Regierungsbevollmächtigter)
1		Britta Schellin (born 1963)	June 1990	2 October 1990	SPD

==== Magdeburg ====
Location of Bezirk Magdeburg within the GDR.

Party leaders

No.	Portrait	Name (Birth–Death)	Took office	Left office
First Secretaries of the Socialist Unity Party of Germany (SED)
1		Alois Pisnik (1911–2004)	1 August 1952	11 February 1979 (deposed)
2		Kurt Tiedke (1924–2015)	11 February 1979	22 June 1983 (transferred to "Karl Marx" Party Academy)
3		Werner Eberlein (1919–2002)	22 June 1983	12 November 1989 (transferred to Central Party Control Commission)
4		Wolfgang Pohl (born 1940)	12 November 1989	December 1989
5		Manfred Dunkel	December 1989	February 1990

Government leaders

No.	Portrait	Name (Birth–Death)	Took office	Left office	Political party
Chairman of the Bezirk Commission
1		Josef Hegen (1907–1969)	1952	1952	SED
Chairmen of the Bezirk Council
1		Josef Hegen (1907–1969)	August 1952	June 1953	SED
2		Paul Hentschel (1913–1959)	June 1953	20 November 1959	SED
—		Bruno Kiesler (1925–2011); Acting Chairman	1957	1958	SED
3		Kurt Ranke (1920–1999)	September 1960	June 1985	SED
4		Siegfried Grünwald (1938–2022)	September 1985	June 1990	SED
Government Commissioner (Regierungsbevollmächtigter)
1		Wolfgang Braun (1939–2016)	11 June 1990	2 October 1990	CDU

==== Cottbus ====
Location of Bezirk Cottbus within the GDR.

Party leaders

No.	Portrait	Name (Birth–Death)	Took office	Left office
First Secretaries of the Socialist Unity Party of Germany (SED)
1		Franz Bruk (1923–1996)	1 August 1952	August 1953
2		Albert Stief (1920–1998)	August 1953	May 1969
3		Werner Walde (1926–2010)	1 June 1969	9 November 1989 (resigned)
4		Wolfgang Thiel (born 1948)	13 November 1989	February 1990

Government leaders

No.	Portrait	Name (Birth–Death)	Took office	Left office	Political party
Chairman of the Bezirk Commission
1		Werner Manneberg (1923–2000)	1 August 1952	11 August 1952	SED
Chairmen of the Bezirk Council
1		Werner Manneberg (1923–2000)	11 August 1952	June 1959	SED
2		Heinz Krüger (1919–2015)	July 1959	February 1962	SED
—		Rudolf Müller (1911–af. 1985); Acting Chairman	1962	1962	SED
3		Hans Schmidt (1915–1995)	June 1962	May 1971	SED
4		Irma Uschkamp (1929–2014)	May 1971	April 1989	SED
5		Peter Siegesmund (1940–2021)	June 1989	June 1990	SED
Government Commissioner (Regierungsbevollmächtigter)
1		Karl-Heinz Kretschmer (born 1948)	June 1990	2 October 1990	CDU

==== Halle ====
Location of Bezirk Halle within the GDR.

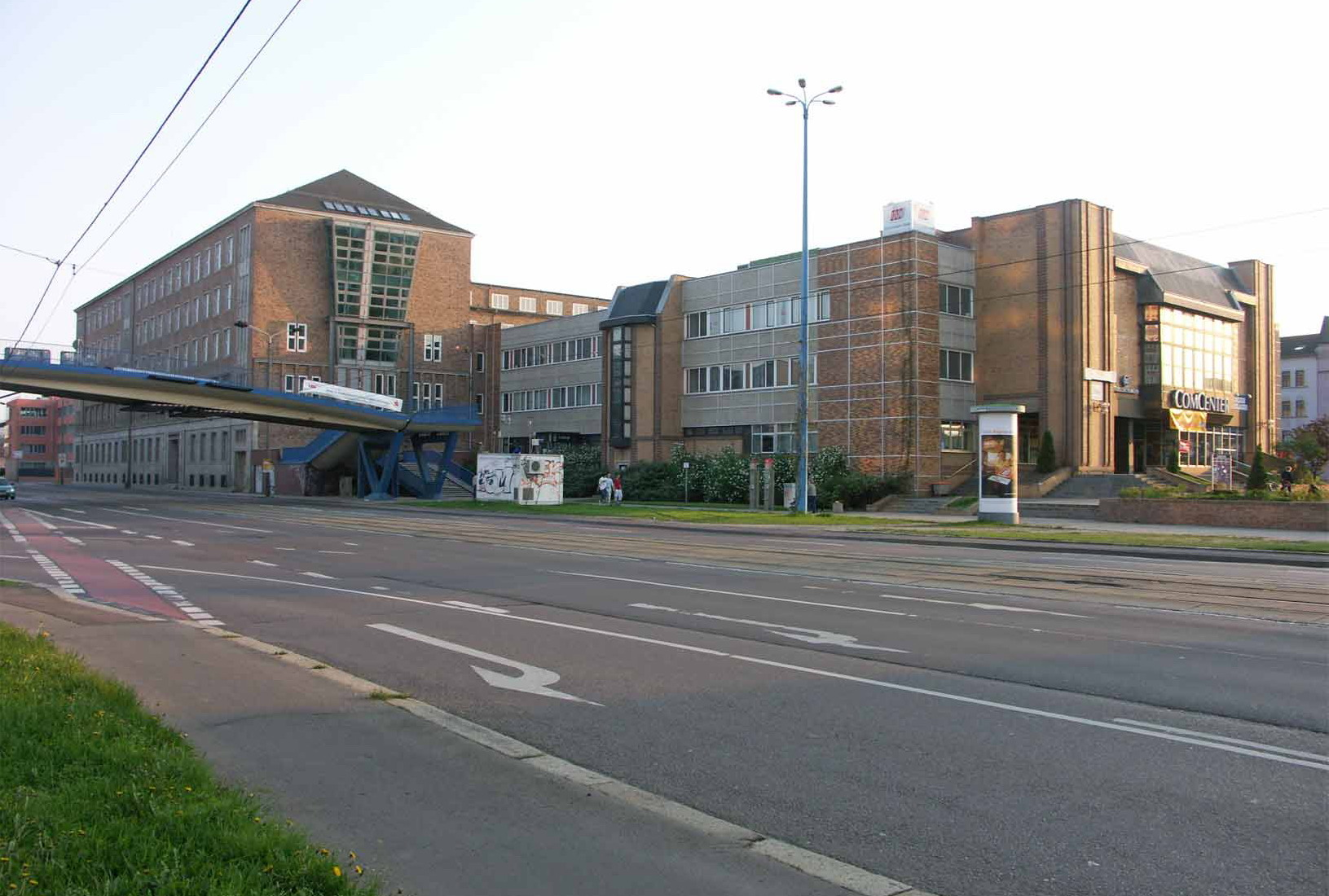
Former Bezirk Halle SED building, still known today as "Café Böhme" in local vernacular, in May 2006

Party leaders

No.	Portrait	Name (Birth–Death)	Took office	Left office
First Secretaries of the Socialist Unity Party of Germany (SED)
1		Bernard Koenen (1889–1964)	August 1952	1953 (appointed Ambassador to Czechoslovakia)
2		Heinz Glaser (1920–1980)	1953	September 1954 (transferred to Bezirk Gera)
3		Franz Bruk (1923–1996)	September 1954	April 1958 (demoted to secretary for agitation and propaganda)
(1)		Bernard Koenen (1889–1964)	April 1958	February 1963 (retired)
4		Horst Sindermann (1915–1990)	February 1963	22 May 1971 (promoted to First Deputy Chairman of the Council of Ministers)
5		Werner Felfe (1928–1988)	22 May 1971	4 May 1981 (promoted to Central Committee Secretariat)
6		Hans-Joachim Böhme (1929–2012)	4 May 1981	9 November 1989 (deposed)
7		Roland Claus (born 1954)	9 November 1989	February 1990

Government leaders

No.	Portrait	Name (Birth–Death)	Took office	Left office	Political party
Chairman of the Bezirk Commission
1		Werner Bruschke (1898–1995)	1952	1952	SED
Chairmen of the Bezirk Council
1		Werner Bruschke (1898–1995)	August 1952	November 1954	SED
2		Helmut Becker (1917–1998)	December 1954	June 1958	SED
3		Otto Leopold (1901–1975)	July 1958	March 1966	SED
4		Helmut Klapproth (1928–2011)	May 1966	February 1984	SED
5		Alfred Kolodniak (born 1931)	February 1984	January 1990	SED
6		Wolfgang Süss (born 1934)	January 1990	June 1990	SED
Government Commissioner (Regierungsbevollmächtigter)
1		Klaus Keitel (1939–2026)	June 1990	2 October 1990	CDU

==== Leipzig ====
Location of Bezirk Leipzig within the GDR.

Party leaders

No.	Portrait	Name (Birth–Death)	Took office	Left office
First Secretaries of the Socialist Unity Party of Germany (SED)
1		Karl Schirdewan (1907–1998)	July 1952	December 1952 (promoted to Central Committee Secretariat)
2		Paul Fröhlich (1913–1970)	January 1953	19 September 1970†
3		Horst Schumann (1924–1993)	21 November 1970	5 November 1989 (retired)
4		Roland Wötzel (born 1938)	5 November 1989	February 1990

Government leaders

No.	Portrait	Name (Birth–Death)	Took office	Left office	Political party
Chairmen of the Bezirk Council
1		Karl Adolphs (1904–1989)	August 1952	March 1959	SED
2		Erich Grützner (1910–2001)	April 1959	February 1974	SED
3		Rolf Opitz (1929–2006)	February 1974	December 1989	SED
4		Joachim Draber (born 1939)	December 1989	June 1990	SED
Government Commissioner (Regierungsbevollmächtigter)
1		Rudolf Krause (born 1939)	June 1990	2 October 1990	CDU

==== Erfurt ====
Location of Bezirk Erfurt within the GDR.

Party leaders

No.	Portrait	Name (Birth–Death)	Took office	Left office
First Secretaries of the Socialist Unity Party of Germany (SED)
1		Erich Mückenberger (1910–1998)	26 July 1952	July 1953 (promoted to Central Committee Secretariat)
2		Hans Kiefert (1905–1966)	August 1953	February 1957 (transferred to East Berlin)
3		Hermann Fischer (1911–1967)	February 1957	27 June 1958 (demoted)
4		Alois Bräutigam (1916–2007)	27 June 1958	11 April 1980 (deposed and demoted to People's Solidarity)
5		Gerhard Müller (1928–2020)	11 April 1980	11 November 1989 (deposed)
6		Herbert Kroker (1929–2022)	11 November 1989	December 1989

Government leaders

No.	Portrait	Name (Birth–Death)	Took office	Left office	Political party
Chairman of the Bezirk Commission
1		Willy Gebhardt (1901–1973)	26 July 1952	1 August 1952	SED
Chairmen of the Bezirk Council
1		Willy Gebhardt (1901–1973)	1 August 1952	9 October 1962	SED
2		Richard Gothe (1928–1985)	9 October 1962	17 January 1985	SED
—		Horst Lang (born 1938); Acting Chairman	17 January 1985	5 March 1985	SED
3		Arthur Swatek (1932–1990)	6 March 1985	4 February 1990	SED
—		Horst Lang (born 1938); Acting Chairman	5 February 1990	8 June 1990	SED
Government Commissioner (Regierungsbevollmächtigter)
1		Josef Duchac (born 1938)	8 June 1990	2 October 1990	CDU

==== Dresden ====
Location of Bezirk Dresden within the GDR.

Party leaders

No.	Portrait	Name (Birth–Death)	Took office	Left office
First Secretaries of the Socialist Unity Party of Germany (SED)
1		Hans Riesner (1902–1976)	August 1952	February 1957
2		Fritz Reuter (1911–2000)	February 1957	May 1960
3		Werner Krolikowski (1928–2016)	May 1960	3 October 1973 (promoted to Central Committee Secretariat)
4		Hans Modrow (1928–2023)	3 October 1973	14 November 1989 (promoted to Chairman of the Council of Ministers)
5		Hans-Joachim Hahn (1934–2022)	15 November 1989	January 1990

Government leaders

No.	Portrait	Name (Birth–Death)	Took office	Left office	Political party
Chairmen of the Bezirk Council
1		Rudolf Jahn (1906–1990)	August 1952	November 1958	SED
2		Walter Weidauer (1899–1986)	December 1958	January 1961	SED
3		Günter Witteck (born 1928)	February 1961	March 1963	SED
4		Manfred Scheler (1929–2014)	March 1963	July 1982	SED
(3)		Günter Witteck (born 1928)	July 1982	December 1989	SED
5		Wolfgang Sieber (1934–2017)	December 1989	February 1990	SED
6		Michael Kunze (born 1944)	February 1990	June 1990	SED
Government Commissioner (Regierungsbevollmächtigter)
1		Siegfried Ballschuh	June 1990	2 October 1990	CDU

==== Karl-Marx-Stadt ====
Location of Bezirk Karl-Marx-Stadt within the GDR.

Party leaders

No.	Portrait	Name (Birth–Death)	Took office	Left office
First Secretaries of the Socialist Unity Party of Germany (SED)
1		Walter Buchheim (1904–1979)	July 1952	October 1959 (transferred to Free German Trade Union Federation)
2		Rolf Weihs (1920–2000)	January 1960	February 1963 (deposed and demoted)
3		Paul Roscher (1913–1993)	February 1963	March 1976
4		Siegfried Lorenz (born 1930)	March 1976	11 November 1989 (promoted to Central Committee Secretariat)
5		Norbert Kertscher (born 1954)	11 November 1989	1990

Government leaders

No.	Portrait	Name (Birth–Death)	Took office	Left office	Political party
Chairman of the Bezirk Council
1		Max Müller (1899–1977)	August 1952	March 1960	SED
2		Werner Felfe (1928–1988)	March 1960	September 1963	SED
3		Heinz Arnold (1920–2000)	1963	January 1981	SED
4		Lothar Fichtner (born 1934)	February 1981	June 1990	SED
Government Commissioner (Regierungsbevollmächtigter)
1		Albrecht Buttolo (born 1947)	11 June 1990	2 October 1990	CDU

==== Gera ====
Location of Bezirk Gera within the GDR.

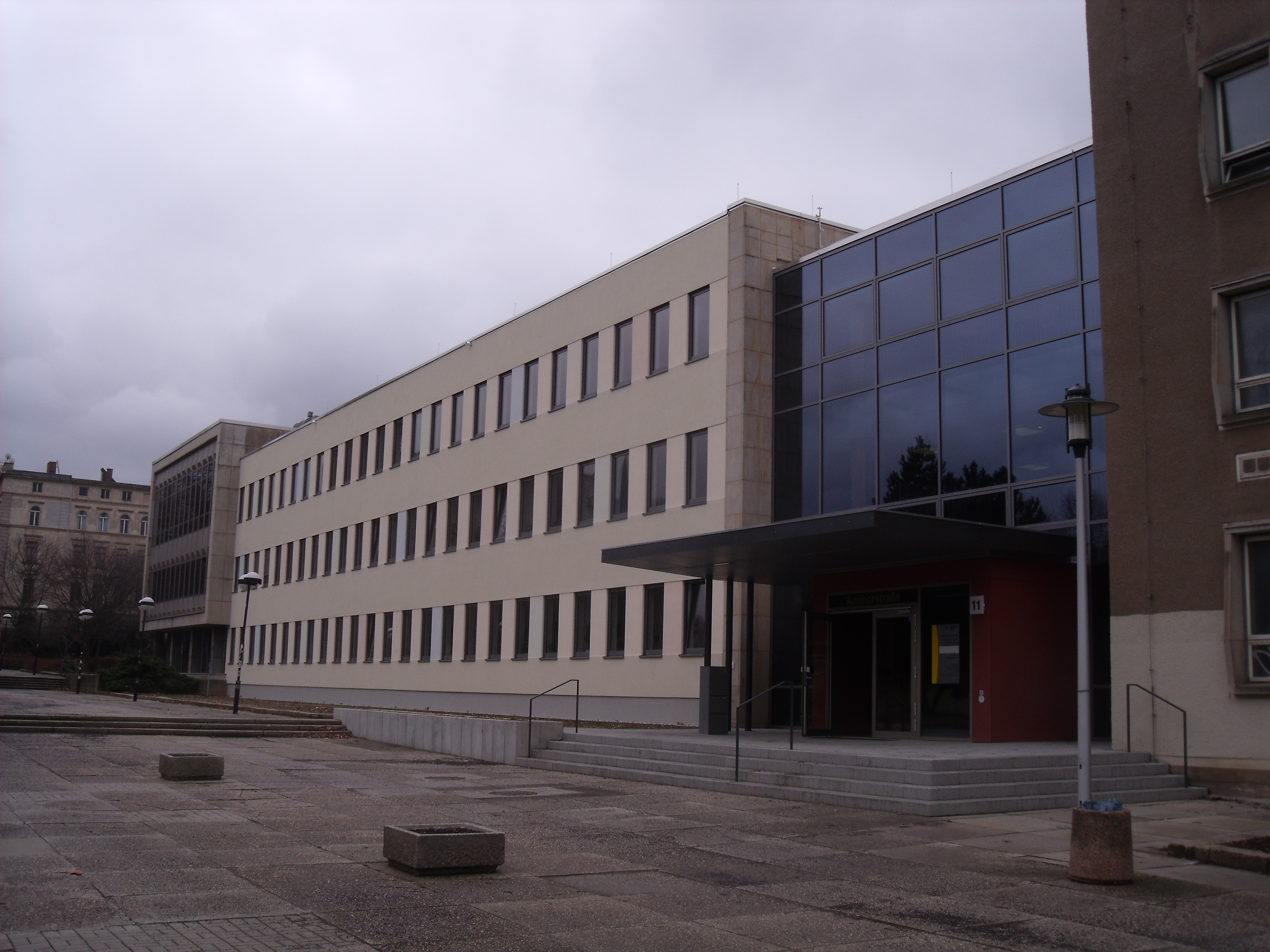
Former Bezirk Gera SED building in March 2012

Party leaders

No.	Portrait	Name (Birth–Death)	Took office	Left office
First Secretaries of the Socialist Unity Party of Germany (SED)
1		Otto Funke (1915–1999)	26 July 1952	1955 (transferred to Bezirk Suhl)
2		Heinz Glaser (1920–1980)	1955	August 1959 (deposed)
3		Paul Roscher (1913–1993)	September 1959	14 February 1963 (transferred to Bezirk Karl-Marx-Stadt)
4		Herbert Ziegenhahn (1921–1993)	14 February 1963	2 November 1989 (deposed)
5		Erich Postler (born 1940)	2 November 1989	December 1989

Government leaders

No.	Portrait	Name (Birth–Death)	Took office	Left office	Political party
Chairman of the Bezirk Commission
1		Lydia Poser (1909–1984)	26 July 1952	1 August 1952	SED
Chairmen of the Bezirk Council
1		Lydia Poser (1909–1984)	1 August 1952	14 October 1959	SED
2		Albert Wettengel (1921–2004)	14 October 1959	19 May 1965	SED
3		Horst Wenzel (1914–1974) (Note: Acting to 8 November 1965.)	20 May 1965	28 March 1973	SED
4		Rudolf Bahmann (1929–1977)	28 March 1973	19 September 1977	SED
—		Joachim Mittasch; Acting Chairman	20 September 1977	8 December 1977	SED
5		Karl-Heinz Fleischer (1932–2008)	9 December 1977	30 May 1983	SED
6		Werner Ullrich (1928–1999)	30 May 1983	9 January 1990	SED
7		Helmut Luck (born 1930) (Note: Acting from 1 June 1990.)	10 January 1990	8 June 1990	SED
Government Commissioner (Regierungsbevollmächtigter)
1		Peter Lindlau	8 June 1990	2 October 1990	CDU

==== Suhl ====
Location of Bezirk Suhl within the GDR.

Party leaders

No.	Portrait	Name (Birth–Death)	Took office	Left office
First Secretaries of the Socialist Unity Party of Germany (SED)
1		Adolf Färber (1912–1987)	26 July 1952	August 1954
2		Kurt Schneidewind (1912–1983)	November 1954	September 1956
3		Otto Funke (1915–1997)	September 1956	15 August 1968 (deposed and demoted to Committee of Antifascist Resistance Fighters)
4		Hans Albrecht (1919–2008)	15 August 1968	2 November 1989 (deposed)
5		Peter Pechauf (1941–2025)	2 November 1989	February 1990

Government leaders

No.	Portrait	Name (Birth–Death)	Took office	Left office	Political party
Chairman of the Bezirk Commission
1		Fritz Sattler (1896–1964)	26 July 1952	1 August 1952	SED
Chairmen of the Bezirk Council
1		Fritz Sattler (1896–1964)	1 August 1952	29 November 1958	SED
2		Wilhelm Behnke (1914–1975)	29 November 1958	26 July 1967	SED
3		Arnold Zimmermann (1922–2015)	26 July 1967	16 May 1990	SED
—		Helmuth Vierling (born 1945); Acting Chairman	16 May 1990	8 June 1990	SED
Government Commissioner (Regierungsbevollmächtigter)
1		Werner Ulbrich (born 1939)	8 June 1990	2 October 1990	CDU

==== SDAG Wismut ====
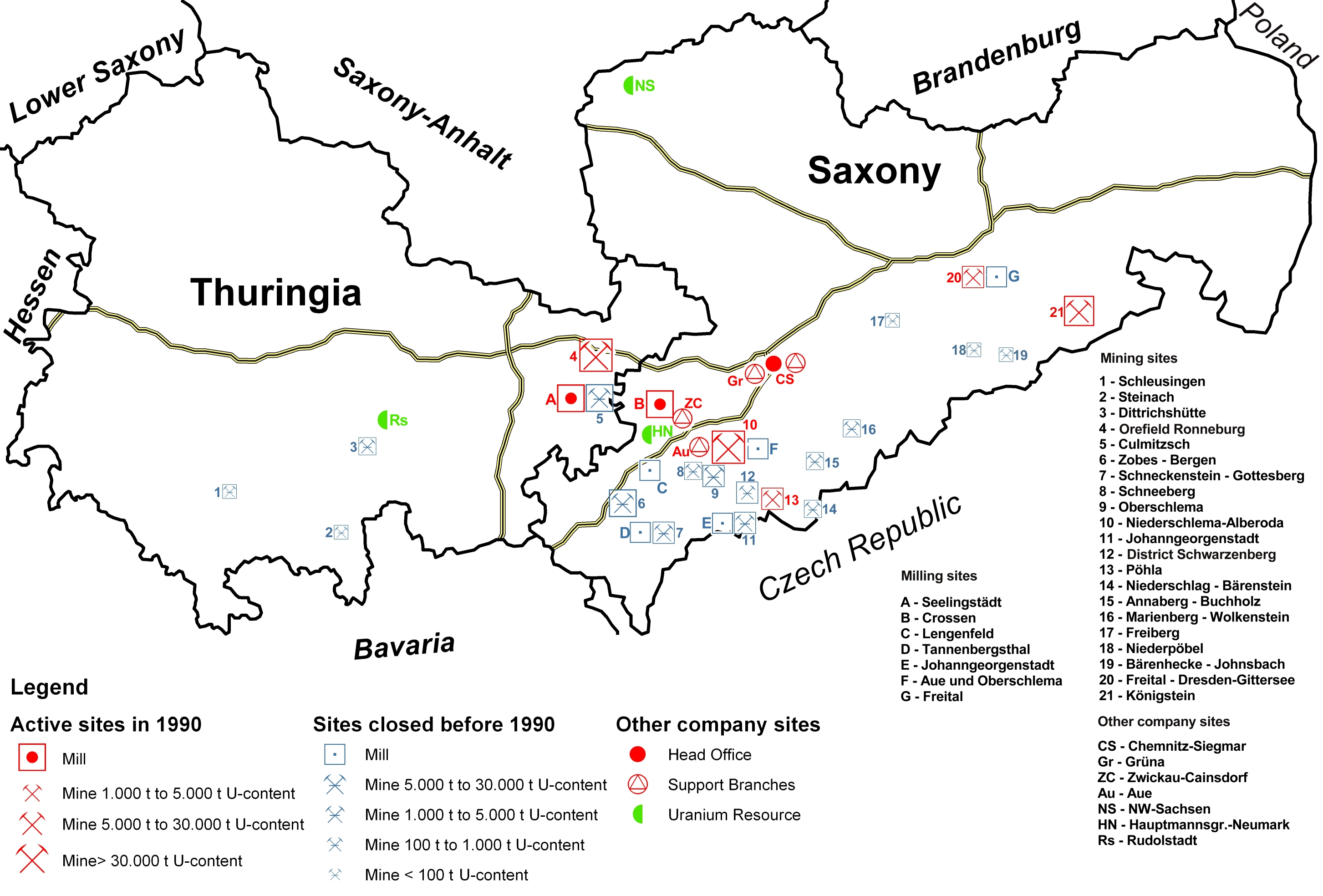
Locations of Wismut in Saxony and Thuringia

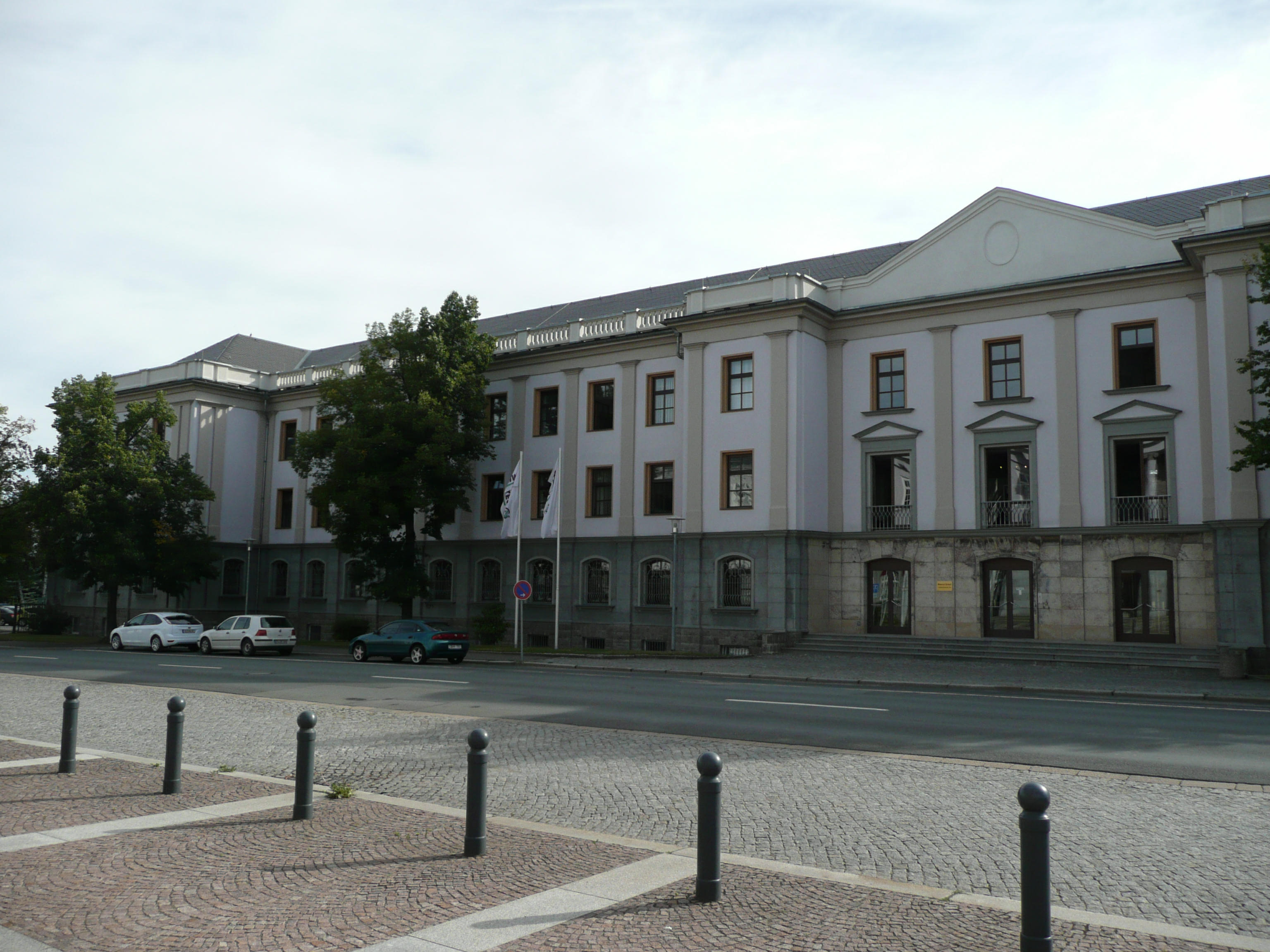
Former SDAG Wismut SED building in Chemnitz in August 2008

General Director

No.	Portrait	Name (Birth–Death)	Took office	Left office
General Director of SDAG Wismut
1		Michail Mitrofanowitsch Malzew (1904–1982)	10 May 1947	12 June 1951
2		Walentin Nikanorowitsch Bogatow (1909–1980)	12 June 1951	1957
3		Wassili Alexejewitsch Sobko (1911–2004)	1957	August 1961
4		Semjon Nikolajewitsch Woloschtschuk (1911–2004)	August 1961	April 1986
5		Horst Bellmann (1949–)	April 1986	November 1989
6		Horst Richter (1938–)	November 1989	1 January 1991

Party leaders

No.	Portrait	Name (Birth–Death)	Took office	Left office
First Secretaries of the Socialist Unity Party of Germany (SED)
1		Kurt Böhme (1913–1991)	October 1947	March 1951 (deposed)
—		Horst Dohlus (1925–2007); Acting	March 1951	October 1951
2		Günter Röder	October 1951	December 1954
3		Alois Bräutigam (1916–2007)	December 1954	June 1958 (transferred to Bezirk Erfurt)
4		Rolf Weihs (1920–2000)	June 1958	24 March 1960 (transferred to Bezirk Karl-Marx-Stadt)
5		Kurt Kieß (1914–1970)	24 March 1960	30 December 1970†
6		Alfred Rohde (1921–1990)	5 February 1971	12 November 1989 (deposed)
7		Heinz Freitag (1936–2002)	12 November 1989	7 December 1989 (party organization dissolved)

=== East Berlin ===
Location of East Berlin within the GDR.

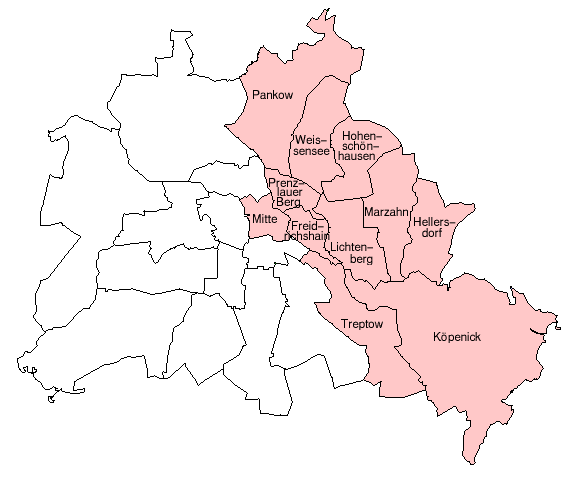
Boroughs of East Berlin (1987).

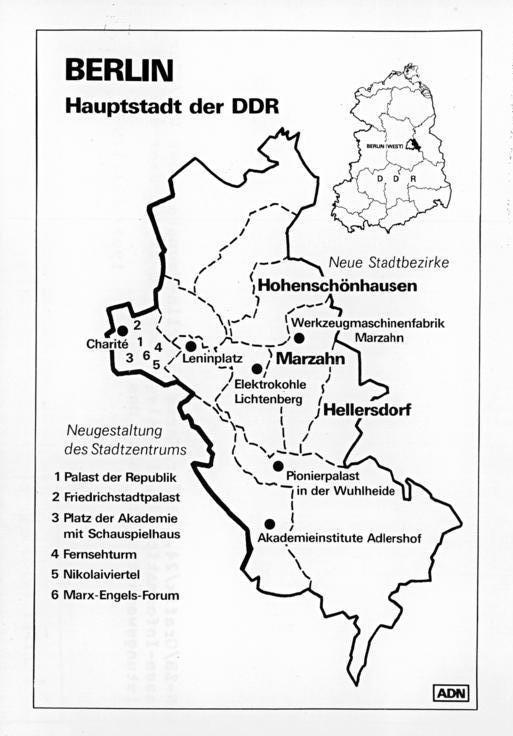
Map of East Berlin (1989).

Party leaders

No.	Portrait	Name (Birth–Death)	Took office	Left office
First Secretaries of the Socialist Unity Party of Germany (SED)
1		Hermann Matern (1893–1971)	21 April 1946	18 October 1948 (transferred to Central Party Control Commission)
2		Hans Jendretzky (1897–1992)	18 October 1948	August 1953 (deposed and demoted)
3		Alfred Neumann (1909–2001)	August 1953	February 1957 (promoted to Central Committee Secretariat)
4		Hans Kiefert (1905–1966)	February 1957	February 1959 (deposed and demoted)
5		Paul Verner (1911–1986)	February 1959	26 November 1971 (promoted within Central Committee Secretariat)
6		Konrad Naumann (1928–1992)	26 November 1971	22 November 1985 (deposed)
7		Günter Schabowski (1929–2015)	22 November 1985	10 November 1989 (promoted within Central Committee Secretariat)
8		Heinz Albrecht (born 1935)	10 November 1989	11 February 1990

The Party Leadership was considered responsible for all of Berlin until the Socialist Unity Party of West Berlin was split from the SED in 1962. However, even after the formal split, the SEW continued to function de facto as a branch of the SED.

No.	Portrait	Name (Birth–Death)	Took office	Left office
First Secretaries of the Socialist Unity Party of West Berlin (SEW)
1		Gerhard Danelius (1913–1978)	24 November 1962	18 May 1978
2		Horst Schmitt (1925–1989)	18 May 1978	22 April 1989

Government leaders

No.	Portrait	Name (Birth–Death)	Took office	Left office	Political party
Lord Mayors
1		Friedrich Ebert Jr. (1894–1979) (Note: Provisional to 17 October 1954.)	30 November 1948	5 July 1967	SED
2		Herbert Fechner (1913–1998)	5 July 1967	11 February 1974	SED
3		Erhard Krack (1931–2000)	11 February 1974	15 February 1990	SED (until 1989)
		Erhard Krack (1931–2000)	11 February 1974	15 February 1990	PDS (from 1989)
—		Hannelore Mensch (born 1937); Acting Lord Mayor [Acting for Krack]	January 1979	1980	SED
—		Ingrid Pankraz (born 1948); Acting Lord Mayor	15 February 1990	23 February 1990	PDS
4		Christian Hartenhauer (born 1948)	23 February 1990	30 May 1990	SPD
5		Tino Schwierzina (1927–2003)	30 May 1990	3 October 1990 (11 January 1991)	SPD

Under Article 16 of the German unification treaty (Einigungsvertrag), until the formation of a Berlin-wide government after the first city-wide elections, the Senate of West Berlin and the Magistrat of East Berlin served as a joint government for all of Berlin, headed jointly by the Governing Mayor of West Berlin and the Lord Mayor of East Berlin.

No.	Portrait	Name (Birth–Death)	Took office	Left office	Political party	No.	Portrait	Name (Birth–Death)	Took office	Left office	Political party
Governing Mayor						Lord Mayor					
11		Walter Momper (born 1945)	(16 March 1989); 3 October 1990	24 January 1991	SPD	5		Tino Schwierzina (1927–2003)	(30 May 1990); 3 October 1990	11 January 1991	SPD
11		Walter Momper (born 1945)	(16 March 1989); 3 October 1990	24 January 1991	SPD	—		Thomas Krüger (born 1959); Acting Lord Mayor	11 January 1991	24 January 1991	SPD

== See also ==
- Politics of East Germany
- Leadership of East Germany
- States of Germany
  - Regions of Germany
