= Bezirk Dresden =

Disestablished district of East Germany

District of Dresden Bezirk Dresden
- District (Bezirk) of East Germany
- 1952–1990
- Flag Coat of arms

- Location of Bezirk Dresden within the German Democratic Republic
- Capital: Dresden
- Area
  - 1989: 6,738 km^{2} (2,602 sq mi)
- Population
  - 1989: 1,757,400
- Government
- SED First Secretary
  - 1952–1957: Hans Riesner
  - 1957–1960: Fritz Reuter
  - 1960–1973: Werner Krolikowski
  - 1973–1989: Hans Modrow
  - 1989–1990: Hans-Joachim Hahn
- Chairman of the Council of the Bezirk
  - 1952–1958: Rudolf Jahn
  - 1958–1961: Walter Weidauer
  - 1961–1963: Günter Witteck
  - 1963–1982: Manfred Scheler
  - 1982–1989: Günter Witteck
  - 1989–1990: Wolfgang Sieber
  - 1990: Michael Kunze
  - 1990: Siegfried Ballschuh (as Regierungsbevollmächtigter)
- History
  - Established: 1952
  - Disestablished: 1990
Preceded by	Succeeded by
Saxony (1945–1952)	Saxony
- Today part of: Germany

The Bezirk Dresden was a district (Bezirk) of East Germany that lasted from 1952 to 1990. Dresden would be reabsorbed into Saxony after the reunification of Germany. The administrative seat and the main town was Dresden.

== History ==
The district was established, with the other 13, on 25 July 1952, with the disestablishment of the old German states. After 3 October 1990 it was disestablished upon German reunification, becoming again part of the state of Saxony.

== Geography ==
=== Position ===
The Bezirk Dresden was the easternmost Bezirk of East Germany. It, bordered on the 'Bezirke' of Cottbus, Leipzig and Karl-Marx-Stadt, as well as on Czechoslovakia and Poland. It was broadly similar in area to the later Direktionsbezirk Dresden, which functioned from 1990 to 2012.

=== Subdivision ===
The Bezirk was divided into 17 Kreise: 2 urban districts (Stadtkreise) and 15 rural districts (Landkreise):

- Urban districts: Dresden; Görlitz.
- Rural districts: Bautzen; Bischofswerda; Dippoldiswalde; Dresden-Land; Freital; Görlitz; Großenhain; Kamenz; Löbau; Meißen; Niesky; Pirna; Riesa; Sebnitz; Zittau.

== See also ==
- Direktionsbezirk Dresden
- Administrative divisions of East Germany
- Bezirk Karl-Marx-Stadt
- Bezirk Leipzig
