= Max Seydewitz =

German politician (1892–1987)

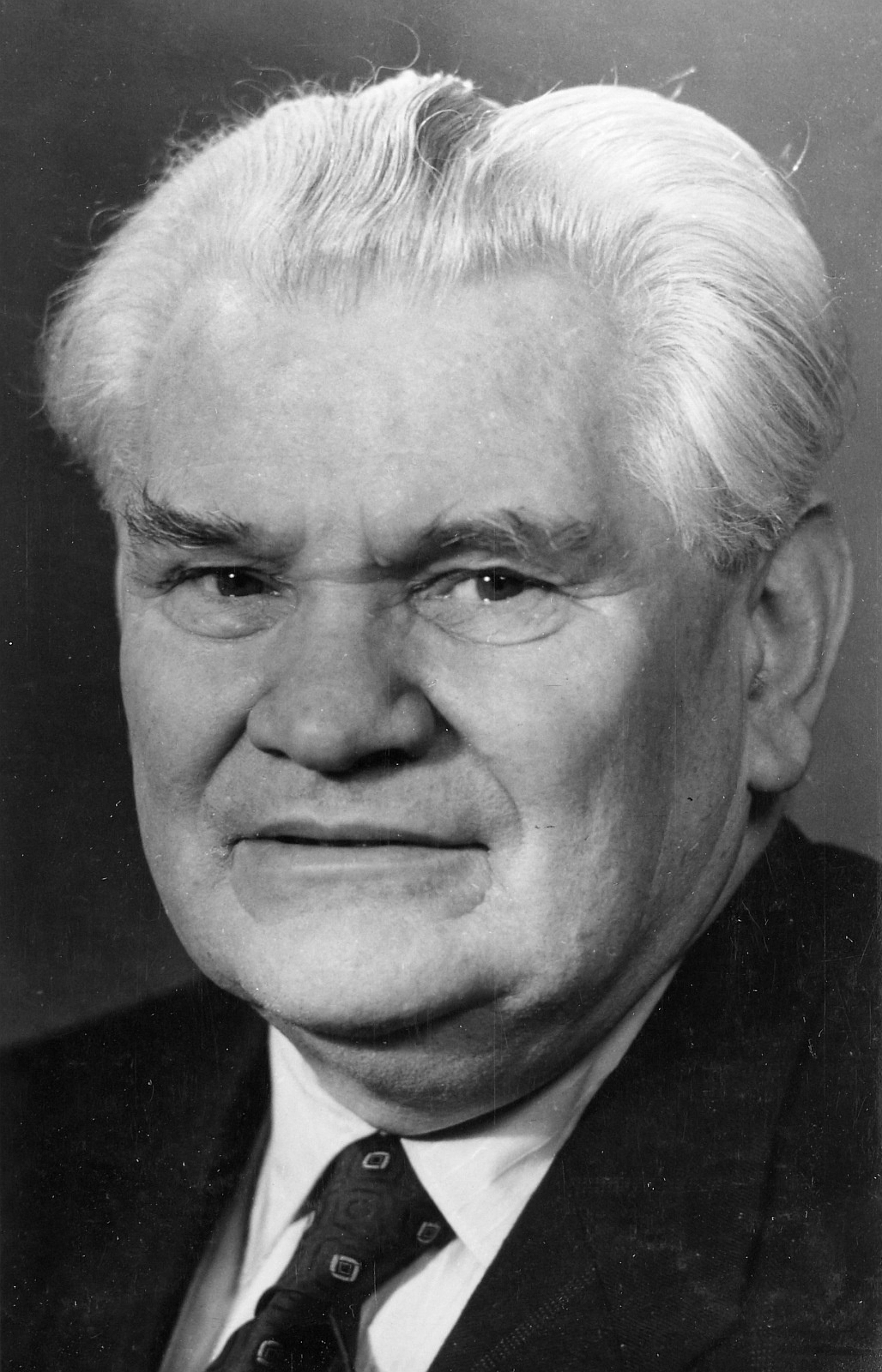
- Seydewitz in 1956

Minister-President of Saxony
- In office 31 July 1947 – 23 July 1952
- Preceded by: Rudolf Friedrichs
- Succeeded by: Position abolished

Member of the Volkskammer
- In office 18 March 1948 – 8 February 1987
- Preceded by: Constituency established
- Succeeded by: Michael Rammer

Chairman of the Socialist Workers' Party of Germany
- In office September 1931 – March 1933
- Serving with: Kurt Rosenfeld; Heinrich Ströbel
- Preceded by: Position established
- Succeeded by: Jacob Walcher (de facto)

Member of the Reichstag for Chemnitz–Zwickau
- In office 27 May 1924 – 31 July 1932
- Preceded by: Multi-member district
- Succeeded by: Multi-member district

Personal details
- Born: 19 December 1892 Forst, Province of Brandenburg, German Empire
- Died: 8 February 1987 (aged 94) Dresden, Bezirk Dresden, East Germany
- Party: SPD (1910–1931); SAPD (1931–1946); SED (1946–1987)
- Spouse(s): Erna Hilbert (m. 1915, divorced) Ruth Lewy (m. 1929)
- Children: 3
- Occupation: Printer; Politician; Writer

Max Seydewitz (December 19, 1892 – February 8, 1987) was a German politician (SPD, SAPD and SED) who served as the Minister-President of Saxony from 1947 to 1952. He also served in the Reichstag of the Weimar Republic and the Volkskammer of the German Democratic Republic.

== Life ==
Max Seydewitz was born in a small town some 25 km (15 miles) east of Cottbus and 150 km (90 miles) south-east of Berlin. His father was a tanner. He attended school locally and undertook an apprenticeship as a book printer. He joined a socialist youth movement in 1907 and in 1910 became a member of the SPD. He served as a soldier in the war between 1914 and 1915 when he was released from the army on grounds of "unsuitability" for war. From 1918 till 1920 he worked as contributing editor on the "Volksblatt" ("People's Voice"), a socialist newspaper in Halle before moving to Zwickau where from 1920 till 1931 he served as Editor in Chief with "Saxony Volksblatt", a daily newspaper of the political left.

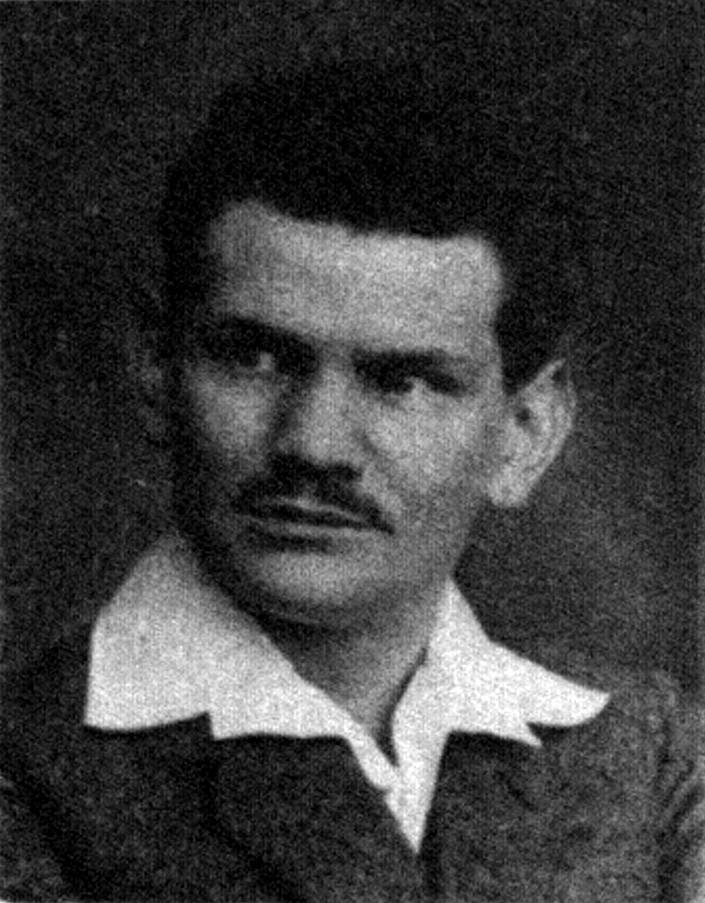
Seydewitz's official Reichstag portrait, 1924

Seydewitz was elected to the Reichstag in May 1924, representing Chemnitz–Zwickau. In 1931, after the left wing of the SPD was expelled, Seydewitz alongside members such as Kurt Rosenfeld established the Socialist Workers' Party of Germany, of which he became the co-chair.

After the Nazi seizure of power, Seydewitz fled Germany and eventually settled in Stockholm and worked as a journalist. During his exile he established contact with the Communist Party of Germany. For a period he was a resident in the Soviet Union and during the Great Purge he was suppressed, although he was later cleared of all charges. His two sons, however, were sent to gulags and were not released until after the Second World War.

In 1945 he arrived at Berlin and in 1946 he became a member of the Socialist Unity Party of Germany and was for a brief period editor of the theoretical organ of SED, Einheit. From 1946 to 1947 he was director of the Berliner Rundfunk.

Seydewitz was elected by the Saxon state parliament as Prime Minister of Saxony and became a member of the Volkskammer. In 1951 was attacked as part of an internal party campaign against former SAPD members and had to practice “self-criticism”. With the dissolution of the federal states in 1952, he lost his position as Prime Minister of Saxony, but remained a member of the Volkskammer until his death in 1987.

From 1955 to 1968 Seydewitz was director of Staatliche Kunstsammlungen Dresden.

Seydewitz died in 1987 in Dresden.

== Statistical comparisons ==
Born in Forst (Lausitz), Seydewitz was the oldest former Minister-President of Germany from November 26, 1985 to May 5, 1991 preceded by Hans Ehard and succeeded by Bruno Diekmann. If one only counts the minister-presidents of the GDR he was oldest from August 1981 to October 8, 1991; preceded by Karl Steinhoff and succeeded by Werner Bruschke.

== Publications ==
- Die Krise des Kapitalismus und die Aufgabe der Arbeiterklasse. Verlag der Marxistischen Büchergemeinde, Berlin 1931
- Todesstrahlen und andere neue Kriegswaffen, mit Kurt Doberer. Malik-Verlag, London 1936
- Stalin oder Trotzki? Die UdSSR und der Trotzkismus. Eine zeitgeschichtliche Untersuchung. Malik-Verlag, London 1938.
- Hakenkreuz über Europa? Vannier, Paris 1939
- Civil Life in Wartime Germany. The Story of the Home Front. New York 1945.
- Es geht um Deutschland. Sachsen-Verlag, Dresden 1949. (gesammelte Rundfunkkommentare 1946–1947).
- Der Antisemitismus in der Bundesrepublik. Mit Ruth Seydewitz, Hrsg. Ausschuß für deutsche Einheit, Berlin 1956
- Das Dresdener Galerie Buch: 400 Jahre Dresdener Gemäldegalerie, mit Ruth Seydewitz, Verlag der Kunst, Dresden 1957
- Deutschland zwischen Oder und Rhein: Ein Beitr. zur neuesten dt. Geschichte. Kongress-Verlag, Berlin 1958
- Zerstörung und Wiederaufbau von Dresden Berlin (Ost) 1955. (ab 3. Auflage: Die unbesiegbare Stadt)
- Die Dresdener Kunstschätze: Zur Geschichte d. Grünen Gewölbes u.d. anderen Dresdener Kunstsammlungen, mit Ruth Seydewitz, VEB Verlag der Kunst, Dresden 1960
- Ruth und Max Seydewitz, Die Dame mit dem Hermelin: Der grösste Kunstraub aller Zeiten. Henschelverlag, Berlin (Ost) 1963
- Es hat sich gelohnt zu leben. Lebenserinnerungen eines alten Arbeiterfunktionärs. Dietz Verlag, Berlin (Ost) 1976.
- Dresden, Musen und Menschen. Ein Beitrag zur Geschichte der Stadt, ihrer Kunst und Kultur. Buchverlag Der Morgen, Berlin, 1988
