= Weidauer =

Weidauer is a surname. Notable people with the surname include:

- Sophie Weidauer (born 2002), German footballer
- Walter Weidauer (1899–1986), German politician
