= Bruno Diekmann =

German politician (1897–1982)

Minister-President of Schleswig-Holstein
- In office 29 August 1949 – 5 September 1950

Member of the German Bundestag
- In office 1953–1969

Personal details
- Born: 19 April 1897 Kiel, German Empire
- Died: 11 January 1982 (aged 84) Kiel, West Germany
- Political party: Social Democratic Party of Germany
- Occupation: Politician

Bruno Diekmann (19 April 1897 – 11 January 1982) was a German politician (SPD) from Kiel and Minister-President of Schleswig-Holstein (1949–1950).

From 5 May 1991 to 11 May 1992, Diekmann was the oldest former Minister-President of Germany, preceded by Max Seydewitz. He is still the oldest Minister-President of the states of the Federal Republic of Germany (FRG), succeeded by Werner Bruschke of the GDR. If only minister-presidents of the FRG are counted, he was the oldest since 27 March 1990, preceded by Hans Ehard.

== Political career ==
| Position | Start time | Elected In | End time |
|---|---|---|---|
| Member of the 2nd German Bundestag | 6 October 1953 | 1953 West German federal election | 6 October 1957 |
| Member of the Landtag of Schleswig-Holstein | 8 May 1947 | - | 31 May 1950 |
| Minister-President of Schleswig-Holstein | 29 August 1949 | - | 5 September 1950 |
| Member of the Landtag of Schleswig-Holstein | 7 August 1950 | | 7 January 1954 |
| Member of the 3rd German Bundestag | 15 October 1957 | 1957 West German federal election | 15 October 1961 |
| Member of the 4th German Bundestag | 17 October 1961 | 1961 West German federal election | 17 October 1965 |
| Member of the 5th German Bundestag | 19 October 1965 | 1965 West German federal election | 19 October 1969 |
