= Kurt Fischer (politician, born 1900) =

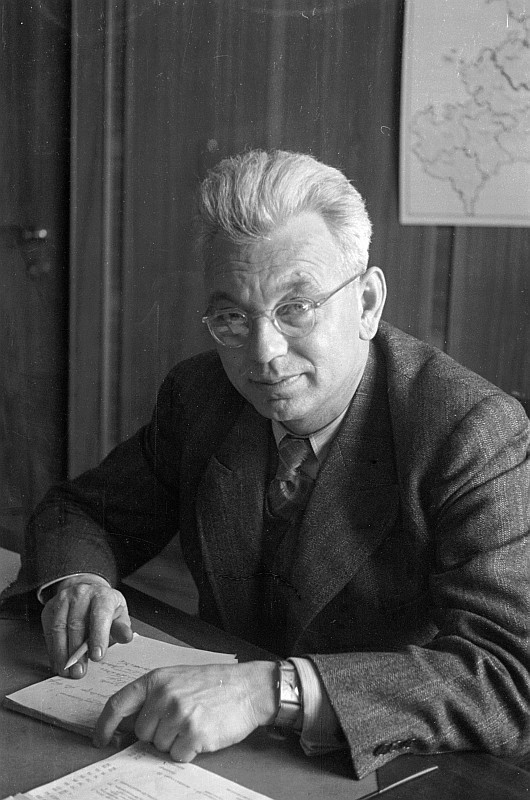
Fischer in 1945

Kurt Fischer (1 July 1900, Halle (Saale) – 22 June 1950, Bad Colberg) was a German politician (KPD, SED).

== Biography ==
Fischer was born in to a working-class family and worked as a teacher. In 1917 he became a member of the Spartacus League and in 1919 he joined the Communist Party of Germany. Because of his involvement in the March Action he fled Germany for the Soviet Union and worked as a teacher.

He returned to Germany in 1923 and edited various newspapers and was party secretary of the KPD in Mecklenburg. He traveled to the Soviet Union again and joined the Communist Party of the Soviet Union and became a Comintern activist while studying at the Frunze Military Academy.

Until the outbreak of the Second World War, Fischer was a spy for the GRU in China and was temporarily a military advisor to Mao Zedong. In 1934 Fischer was arrested in Vienna and was released after nine months in prison. Between 1939 and 1941 Fischer worked within the Red Army for the NKVD, after which he taught at the Lenin University in Kazan. From 1943 Fischer was an agitator of the National Committee For a Free Germany (NKFD) in Soviet prisoner-of-war camps and employees of the broadcaster Free Germany.

Immediately after the end of the Second World War, Fischer was sent to the Soviet occupation zone as an employee of Anton Ackermann in the KPD initiative group for Saxony, and in May 1945 he was appointed deputy to Dresden's Lord Mayor Rudolf Friedrichs. He was appointed Minister of the Interior of Saxony in July 1945 and was Friedrichs' deputy as Prime Minister of Saxony. The collaboration between the two was marked by constant conflict. Unconfirmed rumors linked Fischer with the premature death of the Saxon Prime Minister.

After the unification of the SPD and KPD in 1946, Fischer belonged to the Socialist Unity Party of Germany and its state executive committee in Saxony and was a member of the Saxon state parliament In 1946. On July 12, 1948 he was appointed General Inspector to succeed Erich Reschke as President of the German Administration of the Interior (DVdI) When the German Democratic Republic was founded , the Ministry of the Interior emerged from the DVdI, and Fischer was appointed head of the Volkspolizei on October 12, 1949. From 1949 he was a member of the Volkskammer of East Germany.

== Honors and awards ==
- In Karl-Marx-Stadt, the Stadion an der Gellertstraße was named after him from 1950 to 1990. The sanatorium in Bad Colberg bore his name from 1984.
- 1946 honorary doctorate at the Technical University of Dresden
- In the Kleinzschocher district of Leipzig, Diezmannstrasse was named after Kurt Fischer from 1950 to 1951.
- 1951 Renaming of today's Pastor-Niemöller-Platz in Berlin-Niederschönhausen to Kurt-Fischer-Platz and the adjacent Bismarckstraße to Kurt-Fischer-Straße , in 1992 the name was changed to Hermann-Hesse-Straße.
- In 1969 Kurt Fischer was posthumously awarded the Order of the Red Banner by the Soviet Union.
- In East Berlin there was a dynamo sports community named after him, whose handball team played temporarily in the GDR League (= II. League).
- In Dresden , today's Stauffenbergallee was called Dr.-Kurt-Fischer-Allee from 1950 until the fall of the Wall, and Olbrichtplatz was called Dr.-Kurt-Fischer-Platz.
- A memorial plaque on the enclosure of Wackerbarth Castle still commemorates the meeting of the Soviet military (Anastas Mikoyan and Ivan Konev) with German politicians (Hermann Matern, Kurt Fischer and Rudolf Friedrichs) on May 8, 1945.
- The district office of the MfS in Nordhausen resided at different locations during its forty years of existence: from (unknown) to December 12, 1989 in Dr.-Kurt-Fischer-Strasse (today Ludolfinger Strasse 13).
