= Magnus Poser =

German politician (1907–1944)

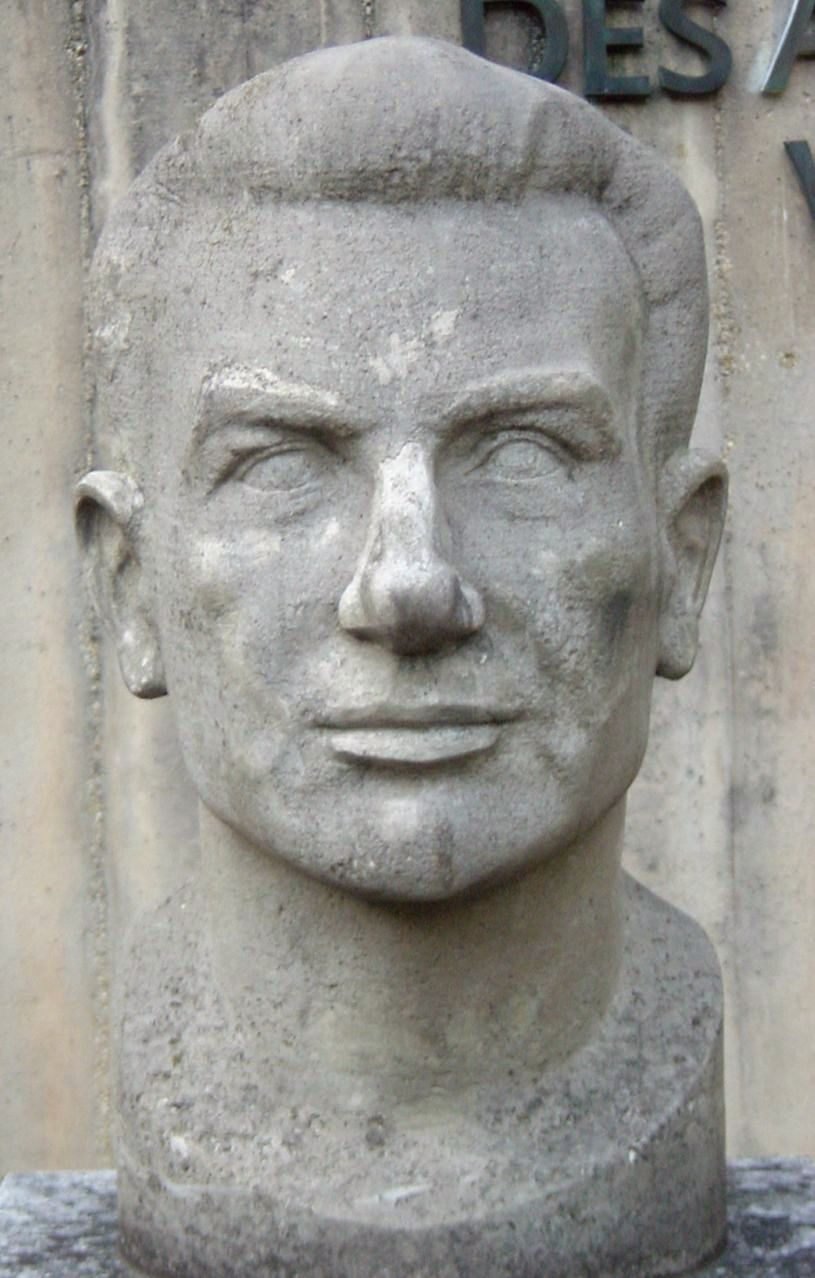
- Bust of Poser in Jena's Nordfriedhof (North Cemetery)
- Born: 26 January 1907; Jena, German Empire
- Died: 21 July 1944 (aged 37); Buchenwald concentration camp, Nazi Germany
- Political party: Communist Party of Germany (1928-)
- Spouse: Lydia Poser

Magnus Poser (26 January 1907 – 21 July 1944) was a member of the German anti-Nazi resistance.

== Life ==
Poser was born in Jena on 26 January 1907, the son of a carpenter and the youngest of four children. He attended school in Jena and after the end of the First World War joined the Free Socialist Youth, the forerunner of the Young Communist League of Germany. After leaving school, he began training as a carpenter, which he completed in 1925. After passing his apprenticeship exam, Poser worked as a wandering journeyman carpenter in Switzerland, Austria, Hungary, Czechoslovakia, Denmark, Finland and the Soviet Union.

In 1928 Poser returned to Jena, and joined the Communist Party of Germany. Shortly afterwards he found a job at the Carl Zeiss company. Poser also become involved in Friends of Nature, through which he came into contact with many leftist intellectuals and activists. In 1929, he joined a proletarian Freethinkers association. On 26 November 1930, Poser lost his job at Carl Zeiss after being sentenced to three months in prison for "trespassing".

After the Nazi Party seized power, Poser joined an underground, illegal resistance group. He was arrested again on 26 November 1933, taken to the Bad Sulza concentration camp. On 20 April 1934, he was sentenced to two years and four months in prison for “preparing to commit high treason”, by the high court in Jena. He served this sentence in the Ichtershausen Prison. After that, Poser worked again as a carpenter. On 26 September 1936, a few weeks after his release, he married Lydia Orban, whom he had known for a long time from the Young Communist League and who had also been sentenced to two years in prison with him. Despite being monitored by the police, he formed a resistance group in Jena that operated an illegal printing press. In early 1942 he got into contact with Theodor Neubauer. From then on, Poser was one of the leading members of the anti-Nazi resistance in Thuringia. Poser's organization had connections to Franz Jacob and Anton Saefkow in Berlin as well as the anti-Nazi military opposition around Claus von Stauffenberg and the Kreisau Circle.

On 14 July 1944, Poser was arrested at work and transferred to the headquarters of the Gestapo in Weimar. After undergoing interrogation and torture, he allegedly tried to flee on the night of 20 July 1944, but was said to have been hit by five shots in an adjacent park. As a result of these injuries, Poser died in the infirmary of the Buchenwald concentration camp on 21 July 1944.
