= Bezirk Gera =

District of East Germany

District of Gera Bezirk Gera
- District (Bezirk) of East Germany
- 1952–1990
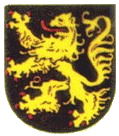
- Flag Coat of arms

- Location of Bezirk Gera within the German Democratic Republic
- Capital: Gera
- Area
  - 1989: 4,004 km^{2} (1,546 sq mi)
- Population
  - 1989: 742,000
- Government
- SED First Secretary
  - 1952–1955: Otto Funke
  - 1955–1959: Heinz Glaser
  - 1959–1963: Paul Roscher
  - 1963–1989: Herbert Ziegenhahn
  - 1989: Erich Postler
- Chairman of the Council of the Bezirk
  - 1952–1959: Lydia Poser
  - 1959–1965: Albert Wettengel
  - 1965–1973: Horst Wenzel
  - 1973–1977†: Rudolf Bahmann
  - 1977: Joachim Mittasch (acting)
  - 1977–1983: Karl-Heinz Fleischer
  - 1983–1990: Werner Ulbrich
  - 1990: Helmut Luck
  - 1990: Peter Lindlau (as Regierungsbevollmächtigter)
- History
  - Established: 1952
  - Disestablished: 1990
Preceded by	Succeeded by
Thuringia	Thuringia
- Today part of: Germany

The Bezirk Gera was a district (Bezirk) of East Germany. The administrative seat and main town was Gera.

== History ==
The district was established, with the other 13, on 25 July 1952, replacing the old German states. After 3 October 1990 it was disestablished following German reunification, becoming again part of the state of Thuringia.

== Geography ==
=== Position ===
The Bezirk Gera had borders with the Bezirke of Suhl, Erfurt, Halle, Leipzig and Karl-Marx-Stadt, as well as with West Germany.

=== Subdivision ===
The Bezirk was divided into 13 Kreise: 2 urban districts (Stadtkreise) and 11 rural districts (Landkreise):

- Urban districts : Gera; Jena.
- Rural districts : Eisenberg; Gera-Land; Greiz; Jena-Land; Lobenstein; Pößneck; Rudolstadt; Saalfeld; Schleiz; Stadtroda; Zeulenroda.
