= Lydia Poser =

German politician (1909–1984)

Member of the Volkskammer
- In office 1950–1963

Chairman of the Gera Bezirk Council
- In office 1952–1959
- Preceded by: position established
- Succeeded by: Albert Wettengel

Member of the Landtag of Thuringia
- In office 1946–1952

Personal details
- Born: January 30, 1909 Heidersbach, Suhl, German Empire
- Died: December 30, 1984 (aged 75) Jena, German Democratic Republic
- Party: Socialist Unity Party of Germany (1946–); Communist Party of Germany (1929–1946)
- Spouse: Magnus Poser

Lydia Poser (née Orban, 30 January 1909 – 30 December 1984) was a German politician of the KPD and SED and widow of the executed Communist official Magnus Poser.

== Life ==
Poser was born as Lydia Orban into a working-class family in Heidersbach, now a part of Suhl. After completing her studies at Volksschule and Lyceum, she trained for work as a typist and took a job with a Jena engineering business. In 1925 she joined the Young Communist League of Germany and became an employee of the local Communist Party office in Jena and Erfurt. From 1927 to 1930, she was chair of the Young Communist working group for Jena, and officially joined the Communist Party in 1929. Following the Nazi seizure of power, she was detained and placed in protective custody for anti-fascist activities. From November to December 1933 she was in the district court jail in Weimar, and was then transferred to the Bad Sulza concentration camp. In April 1934, she was convicted by the Superior Regional Court (Oberlandesgericht) in Jena of "preparation for high treason" and transferred to the women's prison in Gräfentonna. She was released in April 1936 and, from 1937 to 1941 worked once again as a typist and from 1941 to 1945 as a cashier.

After the war, she again became an official for the Communist Party and a member of the party leadership in Jena, now within the Soviet occupation zone. Poser actively encouraged the merger of the KPD and SPD into the Socialist Unity Party of Germany, as both she and her husband had worked in worked in solidarity with SPD members in opposing the Nazi regime. From 1946 she was a member of the regional executive of the SED, and from May 1946 to 1948 she was mayor of Jena.

With the 1946 regional elections in Soviet Occupation Zone, Poser was elected to the Landtag of Thuringia and joined the executive committee. Between 1948 and 1959, she had a variety of official positions in the government of the province of Thuringia and, following the elimination of the state ("Land") level of government, in the Gera district ("Bezirk Gera"). From 1948 to 1950 she was a member of the Landtag and from 1950 to 1952 Chair of the Provincial Commission for State Control. After the abolition of provinces within East Germany in 1952, she became chair of the district council (Rat des Bezirkes), for Gera, representative within the Gera district parliament, and a member of the SED executive for the Gera district. In 1959, she resigned from her positions on medical grounds. She was later the chair of the Committee of Antifascist Resistance Fighters (KdAW) for Gera district.

From 1950 to 1963, she was a member of the national legislature ("Volkskammer"), sitting as a representative of the ruling Socialist Unity (SED) party.

== Honours ==
- For its 400th anniversary celebration in 1958, the Friedrich-Schiller-Universität Jena named Poser an honorary senator (Ehrensenator).
- On her 65th birthday on 30 January 1974, Poser was named an honorary citizen of the city of Jena. On 20 March 1991, after the fall of the GDR, this honour was retracted by the city council.
- She received the Patriotic Order of Merit three times, in 1954, 1969, and 1978, the last at the highest level (honor clasp in gold).

== Literature ==
- Steffen Kachel: Ein rot-roter Sonderweg? Sozialdemokraten und Kommunisten in Thüringen 1919 bis 1949. [= Veröffentlichungen der Historischen Kommission für Thüringen, Kleine Reihe Band 29]. Böhlau, Köln/Weimar/Wien, ISBN 978-3-412-20544-7, S. 562.
