= Karl Steinhoff =

German politician (1929–1990)

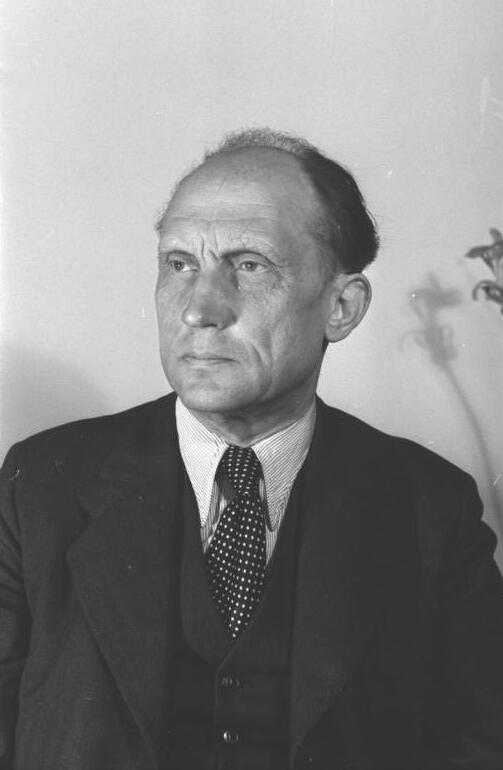
- Steinhoff in 1951

Minister for the Interior
- In office 7 October 1949 – 9 May 1952
- Minister-President: Otto Grotewohl
- Preceded by: Position established
- Succeeded by: Willi Stoph

Minister-President of Brandenburg (Note: as President of the Provincial Administration until 18 December 1946)
- In office 4 July 1945 – 5 December 1949
- Deputy: Bernhard Bechler
- Preceded by: Position established
- Succeeded by: Rudolf Jahn
Volkskammer
Member of the Volkskammer
In office 8 November 1950 – 19 November 1954
Preceded by	Constituency established
Succeeded by	multi-member district

Personal details
- Born: Carl Steinhoff; 24 November 1892 Herford, Province of Westphalia, Kingdom of Prussia, German Empire (now North Rhine-Westphalia, Germany)
- Died: 19 July 1981 (aged 88) Wilhelmshorst, Bezirk Potsdam, East Germany
- Party: Socialist Unity Party (1949–1981)
- Other political affiliations: Social Democratic Party (1923–1946)
- Education: University of Münster (Dr. jur.)
- Occupation: Politician; Civil Servant; Lawyer
- Central institution membership: 1949–1950: Candidate member, Politburo of the Central Committee; 1949–1954: Full member, Central Committee; Other offices held: 1949–1950: Member, Provisional Volkskammer; 1948–1949: Member, German People's Council; 1929–1932: Vice President, East Prussia; 1928–1929: Vice President, Regierungsbezirk Gumbinnen; 1926–1928: District Administrator, Landkreis Zeitz

Karl Steinhoff (November 24, 1892 – July 19, 1981) was a Minister-president (Ministerpräsident) of the German state (Land) of Brandenburg, then part of East Germany, and later served as East Germany's Minister of the Interior.

== Biography ==
Born in Herford, Steinhoff studied law from 1910 through 1921 at the Universities of Freiburg, Munich, Königsberg, Berlin, and Münster, earning his doctorate in 1921. From 1921 to 1923, he was active in the Ministry of the Interior and Justice; in 1924 served as Legation Secretary (Legationssekretär) of the Saxon legation in Berlin; in 1925-26 as a government advisor (Regierungsrat) in the administration (Amtshauptmannschaft) of Zittau; in 1927–28 as district chief (Landrat) of Zeitz; and later as a vice president (Regierungsvizepräsident) in Gumbinnen and vice president (Vize-Oberpräsident) in Königsberg.

Politically, he had joined the Social Democratic Party of Germany (SPD) in 1923. Amidst the turmoil of the early 1930s (see Nazi Germany), he was given time off in 1932 and dismissed from government service in 1933. From 1940 to 1945, during World War II, he served as lawyer for a cardboard-box wholesale business in Berlin.

At the end of the war in 1945, he became president of the provincial administration (Provinzialverwaltung) of Brandenburg. He joined the Socialist Unity Party of Germany (SED) in 1946, and from 1946 to 1949 served as Brandenburg's Minister-President and as a member of its state parliament. From 1949-52 he was East Germany's Minister of the Interior; his dismissal at the end of that time was arranged by Walter Ulbricht.

During that time, he was a member of the German People's Council (Deutscher Volksrat) from 1948–49, and from 1950 to 1954 a member of the Volkskammer. Within the SED, he was a member of the central committee of the SED from 1949-54. He also served as a professor of administrative law at Humboldt University in Berlin from 1949-55.

He received the Fatherland Order of Merit (Vaterländischer Verdienstorden), the honor clip (Ehrenspange) to the Fatherland Order of Merit, and the Order of Karl Marx.

He was the oldest former Minister-President of East Germany. Steinhoff was preceded by Wilhelm Höcker and succeeded by Max Seydewitz.
