= Eduard Götzl =

German-Czech politician (1921–1986)

First Secretary of the Socialist Unity Party in Bezirk Frankfurt (Oder)
- In office April 1958 – 2 August 1961
- Second Secretary: Erich Heyl; Rudolf Held
- Preceded by: Gerhard Grüneberg
- Succeeded by: Erich Mückenberger

First Secretary of the Socialist Unity Party in Bezirk Potsdam
- Acting
- In office April 1956 – August 1957
- Second Secretary: Margarete Langner
- Preceded by: Kurt Seibt
- Succeeded by: Kurt Seibt

Personal details
- Born: 18 February 1921 Bečov nad Teplou, Czechoslovakia
- Died: 16 January 1986 (aged 64) Potsdam, Bezirk Potsdam, East Germany
- Party: Socialist Unity Party (1946–1989)
- Other political affiliations: Communist Party of Germany (1945–1946)
- Education: "Karl Marx" Party Academy; CPSU Higher Party School "W. I. Lenin"
- Occupation: Politician; Party Functionary; Policeman
- Awards: Patriotic Order of Merit, 1st class
- Central institution membership: 1954–1963: Full member, Central Committee; 1950–1954: Candidate member, Central Committee; Other offices held: 1970–1979: First Secretary, Socialist Unity Party in Rathenow district; 1963–1970: Chairman, Bezirk Potsdam ABI; 1951–1951: First Secretary, Socialist Unity Party in Erfurt

Eduard Götzl (18 February 1921 – 16 January 1986) was a German-Czech politician and party functionary of the Socialist Unity Party (SED).

He moved to the Soviet occupation zone after the war, where he became a SED functionary. He most notably served as First Secretary of the Bezirk Frankfurt (Oder) SED in the late 1950s and early 1960s. Götzl was however removed from office in August 1961 and only held minor positions afterwards.

== Life and career ==
=== Czechoslovakia ===
Götzl, the son of a worker, attended elementary school in Bečov nad Teplou and vocational school in Karlovy Vary. He trained as a mechanic and worked in that profession afterward. In 1936, he became a member of the Socialist Workers' Youth of Czechoslovakia.

During World War II, Götzl was initially conscripted into military service and then worked as an armaments worker in the aircraft industry from 1943 to 1945.

=== Early career ===
In 1945, he moved to the Soviet occupation zone. That year, he joined the KPD (Communist Party of Germany), and after the forced merger of the KPD and SPD (Social Democratic Party of Germany) in April 1946, he became a member of the SED (Socialist Unity Party of Germany).

From 1945 to 1946, he served in the Volkspolizei. Between 1946 and 1949, he worked as an instructor for the Thuringia SED. He was made a full member of its leadership in 1949.

From 1949 to 1950, he studied at the SED's "Karl Marx" Party Academy in Berlin, after which he was made a candidate member of the Central Committee of the SED in July 1950 (III. Party Congress) and party secretary at the steel and rolling mill Maxhütte in Unterwellenborn.

In July 1951, Götzl was promoted to First Secretary of the SED in Erfurt, but was transferred to Bezirk Potsdam in August, where he was made director of the steel and rolling mill in Brandenburg an der Havel.

=== Bezirk Potsdam SED ===
After being made a full member of the Central Committee of the SED in April 1954 (IV. Party Congress), Götzl left his position as director in August to study at the CPSU Higher Party School "W. I. Lenin" in Moscow.

He returned in July 1955 and was made secretary for economic affairs of the Bezirk Potsdam SED in September 1955.

Götzl served as acting First Secretary of the Bezirk Potsdam SED from April 1956 to August 1957 while Seibt attended the CPSU Higher Party School. After Seibt’s return, Götzl resumed his role as secretary for economic affairs until March 1958.

=== Bezirk Frankfurt (Oder) SED First Secretary ===
In April 1958, Götzl was promoted to First Secretary of the SED in neighbouring Bezirk Frankfurt (Oder), succeeding Gerhard Grüneberg, who had joined the Politburo and Secretariat of the Central Committee of the SED. He additionally became member of the Volkskammer later that year.

=== Long retirement ===
Götzl was dismissed on 2 August 1961 by the Central Committee Secretariat because he could not ensure "the strict implementation of party resolutions". He was replaced by Erich Mückenberger, who had lost his position as SED Agriculture Secretary to Grüneberg in the year prior.

Götzl had to retire from both the Central Committee and Volkskammer, in January 1963 (VI. Party Congress) and November 1963 respectively. He was transferred back to Bezirk Potsdam, serving as First Deputy Chairman of the Bezirk government from September 1961 to August 1963. A major demotion considering Bezirk governments were completely subservient to their respective local SED leadership.

From September 1963 to January 1970, he headed the Workers' and Farmers' Inspection in Bezirk Potsdam. He only rejoined the SED's nomenklatura in February 1970 when he was made First Secretary of the SED in Rathenow district, a mostly rural district in the western part of Bezirk Potsdam. He was relieved of his duties for health reasons in January 1979.

Götzl was married and had two children. He lived as a widower in Potsdam and died at the age of 64. His urn was interred in the New Cemetery in Potsdam.
