= Gerhard Grüneberg =

German politician (1921–1981)

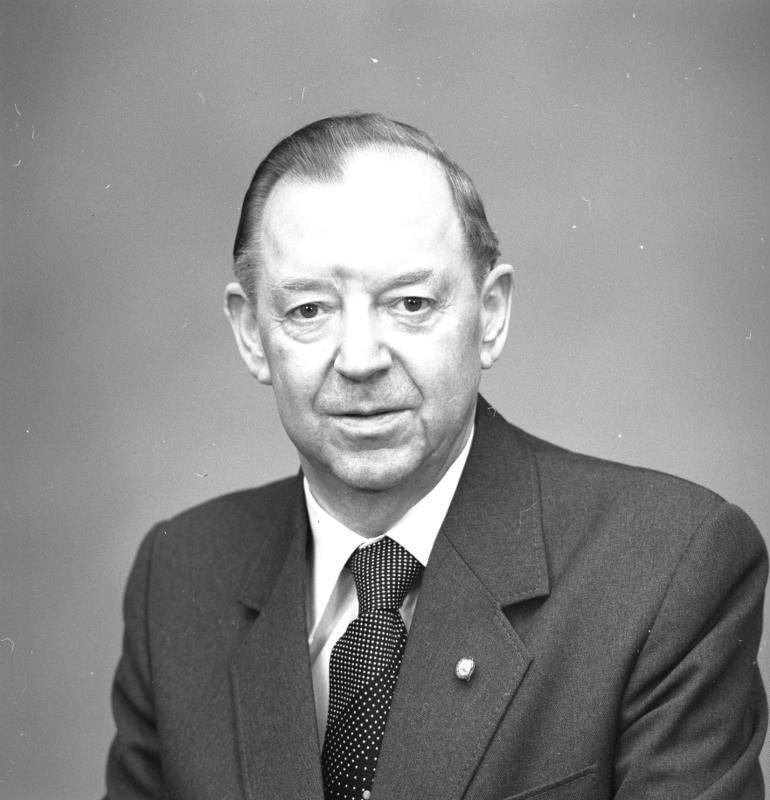
- Grüneberg in 1981

Secretary for Agriculture of the Central Committee Secretariat
- In office 2 August 1961 – 10 April 1981
- General Secretary: Walter Ulbricht; Erich Honecker
- Preceded by: Erich Mückenberger
- Succeeded by: Werner Felfe

Secretary for State and Legal Affairs of the Central Committee Secretariat
- In office 6 February 1958 – 19 June 1971
- First Secretary: Walter Ulbricht
- Preceded by: Walter Ulbricht
- Succeeded by: Friedrich Ebert Jr.

First Secretary of the Socialist Unity Party in Bezirk Frankfurt (Oder)
- In office 1 August 1952 – February 1958
- Second Secretary: Marianne Blankenhagen; Erich Heyl
- Preceded by: Willy Sägebrecht (as First Secretary of the SED in Brandenburg)
- Succeeded by: Eduard Götzl
Volkskammer
Member of the Volkskammer for Brandenburg-Stadt, Brandenburg-Land, Belzig, Rathenow
In office 3 December 1958 – 10 April 1981
Preceded by	multi-member district
Succeeded by	Günter Schabowski

Personal details
- Born: Gerhard Grüneberg; 29 August 1921 Lehnin, Province of Brandenburg, Free State of Prussia, Weimar Republic (now Kloster Lehnin, Brandenburg, Germany)
- Died: 10 April 1981 (aged 59) East Berlin, East Germany
- Resting place: Memorial of the Socialists, Friedrichsfelde Central Cemetery
- Party: Socialist Unity Party (1946–1981)
- Other political affiliations: Communist Party of Germany (1946)
- Education: "Karl Marx" Party Academy
- Occupation: Politician; Party Functionary; Bricklayer
- Awards: Iron Cross, 2nd class; Patriotic Order of Merit, 1st class; Order of Karl Marx
- Central institution membership: 1966–1981: Full member, Politburo of the Central Committee; 1959–1966: Candidate member, Politburo of the Central Committee; 1959–1981: Full member, Central Committee; 1958–1959: Candidate member, Central Committee; Other offices held: 1949–1952: Secretary for Cadre Affairs, Socialist Unity Party in Brandenburg; 1948–1949: First Secretary, Socialist Unity Party in Guben district

Gerhard Grüneberg (10 August 1921 – 10 April 1981) was a German politician and high-ranking party functionary of the Socialist Unity Party (SED).

In the German Democratic Republic, he served as the First Secretary of the SED in Bezirk Frankfurt (Oder) and was a member of the Politburo of the Central Committee of the SED. From the 1960s to the early 1980s, he was the powerful SED Agriculture Secretary, instituting various reforms to the GDR's collectivized agricultural sector.

== Life and career ==
Grüneberg grew up in humble circumstances in Lehnin, Brandenburg. His parents were members of the Communist Party of Germany (KPD) since 1919 and 1928, respectively. From 1928 to 1933, Grüneberg was a member of the Jung-Spartacus League.

After completing elementary school, Grüneberg learned the trade of a bricklayer (1936–1939) and worked in this field until his conscription into the Kriegsmarine in the spring of 1941. He served on various ships, reached the rank of a Maat, and was awarded the Iron Cross, 2nd class.

In July 1943, Grüneberg married Elly Lehmann, with whom he had two children. After the war, he was captured by the British and released in August 1945, after which he worked as a bricklayer in Oldenburg, Lower Saxony.

== Political career ==
=== Early career ===
Grüneberg moved to Brandenburg in the Soviet Occupation Zone at the turn of 1945/46. On 1 March 1946, he joined the KPD, which merged with the SPD later that year to form the Socialist Unity Party of Germany (SED).

Initially, he continued working as a bricklayer and in 1947, spent around six months as a Neulehrer in Oranienburg. The SED then delegated him to the Niederbarnim district party school. Gerhard Grüneberg initially worked in the SED local leadership in Oranienburg and, starting from 1 September 1947, served as the department head for party education, recruitment, culture, and education in the SED district leadership in Guben.

At the age of just 26, he became the First Secretary of the district in 1948, the highest official in the region. In 1948, he attended the state party school in Schmerwitz near Wiesenburg/Mark. After two years as the First Secretary, the SED brought Grüneberg to the Brandenburg State Leadership in 1949. In the state's inner circle of power, the secretariat, he was in charge of cadre work.

=== Bezirk Frankfurt (Oder) SED career ===
With the dissolution of the states in 1952, Grüneberg moved to the SED Bezirk Frankfurt (Oder) Leadership as the First Secretary. Alongside his work, he completed a distance-learning program at the "Karl Marx" Party Academy, earning a diploma in social sciences.

=== Central Committee Secretary ===
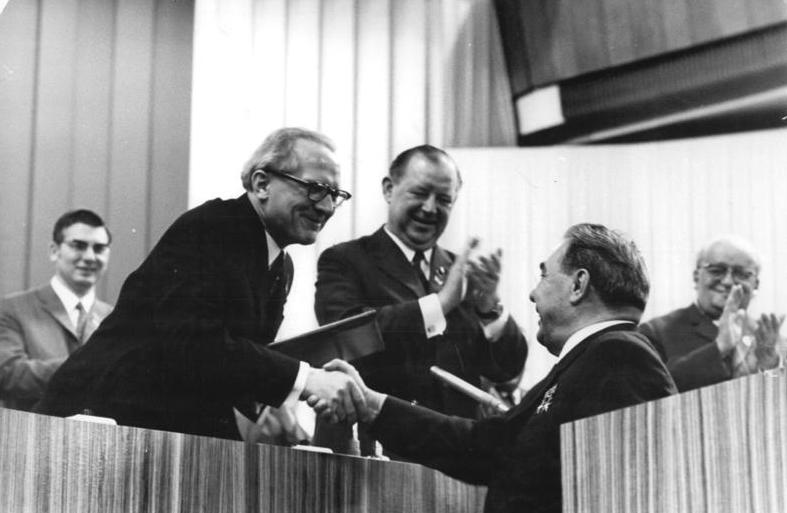
Grüneberg (center) between Erich Honecker (left of center) and Soviet leader Leonid Brezhnev (right of center) at the 6th SED Party Congress in June 1971

In 1958, Grüneberg achieved his next career advancement. He became the secretary of the SED Central Committee for State and Legal Affairs and concurrently became a member of the Volkskammer, nominally representing a constituency in southwestern Bezirk Potsdam.

On 13 December 1959, he became a candidate member and on 15 September 1966, a full member of the Politburo of the Central Committee of the SED. The Politburo appointed him as the head of their agricultural commission.

=== SED Agriculture Secretary ===
In 1960, he became the Secretary for Agriculture of the SED Central Committee. From 4 July 1962, Grüneberg also served as the 'Minister for Coordinating Tasks in Agriculture' and was a member of the Presidium of the Council of Ministers in 1962/63. Additionally, in 1963, he took charge of the Bureau for Agriculture at the Politburo, became a member of the Council for Agriculture and Food Economy, and from 1966, a member of the Presidium of the GDR Research Council.

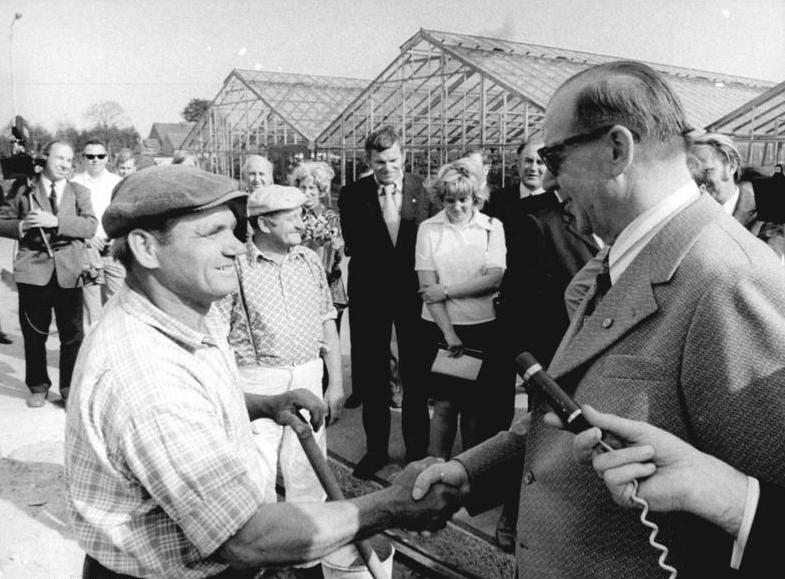
Grüneberg (right) visiting farmers in Lehnin in May 1974

In the 1960s and 1970s, Grüneberg was the key agricultural policymaker of the SED and thus the GDR. As a consequence, he implemented many ideas aimed at industrializing the collectively managed agriculture since 1960. The most significant aspect became the gradual separation of animal and plant production, starting in the mid-1960s. This was particularly evident under the leadership of Erich Honecker, under whom Grüneberg expanded his power after falling out of favor with Walter Ulbricht in 1969 due to 'exaggerations.'

By the late 1970s, it became evident that the systematic operational separation between arable farming and animal husbandry was a failure, and the sizes of the farms became almost unmanageable. This led to internal criticism of Grüneberg – notably by the Central Committee Secretary for Economics, Günter Mittag. Grüneberg, together with his ally Bruno Kiesler (Head of the Agriculture Department of the Central Committee), attempted to alleviate the consequences through increased cooperation, which yielded limited success.

Even before his death, an agricultural policy shift began, intensifying under his successor as the Central Committee Secretary for Agriculture, Werner Felfe.

Felfe was awarded the Patriotic Order of Merit in 1959, 1964 and 1971 and the Karl Marx Order in 1979.

=== Death ===
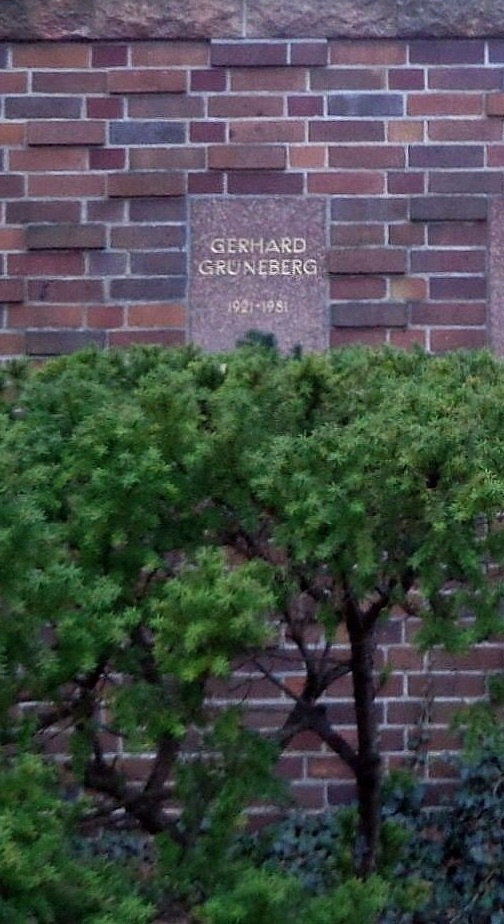
Grüneberg's grave in 2021

Grüneberg died in 1981 at the age of 59 from a tumor. A state funeral took place at the SED Central Committee House in Berlin.

He was interred at the Memorial of the Socialists at the Friedrichsfelde Central Cemetery in Berlin-Lichtenberg. Paul Verner delivered the eulogy.
