= Curt Wach =

German politician (1906–1974)

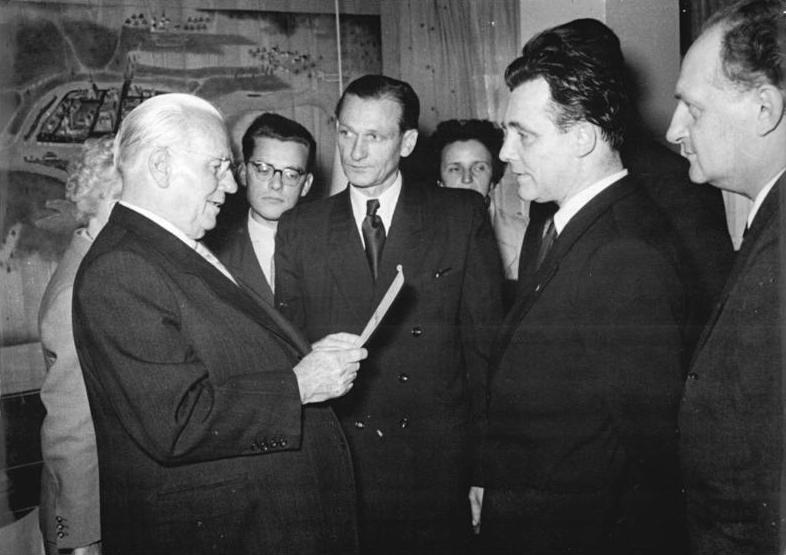
Wilhelm Pieck (left), Curt Wach (center), and Hermann Henselmann (2nd from right) during their visit to the Children's Department Store on Berlin, Karl-Marx-Allee (1954).

Curt Wach (February 5, 1906 in Gersdorf near Hainichen – June 18, 1974) was a German politician (KPD/SED). He served as Chairman of the Potsdam District Council and as Minister of Trade and Supply in the GDR.

== Life ==
Wach, the son of a farm laborer, attended primary school and learned the trade of a machinist. He worked in this profession, as well as a laborer in a paper mill and a brickworks. In 1920, he became a member of the German Metal Workers' Union. In 1927, he joined the Communist Party of Germany (KPD) and served as a works council member at the Framo works in Frankenberg. Starting in 1928, he worked as an instructor in the KPD's Hainichen area. Wach attended the KPD Party School in Thalheim and was a lecturer there. From 1932, he served as the political leader of the KPD sub-district Riesa and was a member of the Secretariat of the KPD District Leadership Saxony.

Following the Nazi rise to power, Wach participated in communist resistance. In May 1933, he was arrested and sentenced to 21 months of penal labor by the Second Criminal Senate of the Higher Regional Court of Dresden in April 1934. After completing his prison term at Waldheim Prison, he was transferred to Sachsenburg concentration camp and was not released until 1936. He worked as a naturopath and a lathe operator. Wach was arrested again in January 1945, but managed to escape in March 1945.

In 1945/1946, Wach was the mayor of Hainichen. He became a member of the SED in 1946 and was at times the secretary of the SED state leadership in Saxony for the Upper Lusatia region. From 1946 to 1950, he was district councilor and district council chairman of the Dippoldiswalde Rural District. From 1950 to July 1952, he was the First Chairman of the State Commission for State Control in Brandenburg, and from 1952 to 1953, he served as Chairman of the Potsdam District Council.

From February 1953 to July 1959, Wach served as Minister of Trade and Supply in the GDR and was a member of the Presidium of the Council of Ministers from November 1954 to December 1958. In 1959, he retired for health reasons.

== Awards ==
- Patriotic Order of Merit of the German Democratic Republic in Silver (1957)
- Medal for Fighters Against Fascism (1958)

== Literature ==
- Ursula Hoffmann-Lange: Die Veränderungen in der Sozialstruktur des Ministerrates der DDR 1949–1969. Droste Verlag, Düsseldorf 1971, ISBN 3-7700-0281-4, p. 79 and 100.
- Gabriele Baumgartner: Wach, Kurt [sic!]. In: Gabriele Baumgartner, Dieter Hebig (Eds.): Biographical Handbook of the SBZ/DDR. 1945–1990. Volume 2: Maassen – Zylla. K. G. Saur, Munich 1997, ISBN 3-598-11177-0, p. 968.
- Martin Broszat et al. (Eds.): SBZ-Handbuch: Staatliche Verwaltungen, Parteien, gesellschaftliche Organisationen und ihre Führungskräfte in der Sowjetischen Besatzungszone Deutschlands 1945–1949. 2nd edition. Oldenbourg Wissenschaftsverlag, Munich 1993, ISBN 3-486-55262-7, p. 1049.
- Friederike Sattler: Wirtschaftsordnung im Übergang. Politik, Organisation und Funktion der KPD/SED im Land Brandenburg bei der Etablierung der zentralen Planwirtschaft in der SBZ/DDR 1945–52. Lit, Münster 2002, ISBN 3-8258-6321-2, p. 968.
