= Walter Weidauer =

German politician (1899–1986)

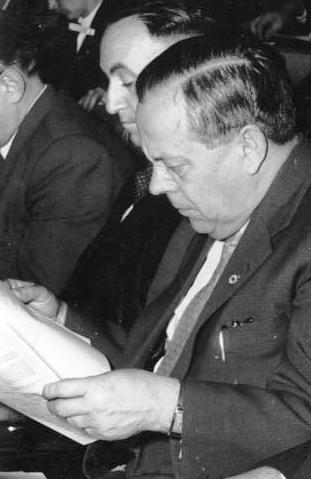
- Walter Weidauer (1958)
- Born: Arno Walter Weidauer; 28 July 1899; Lauter, Kingdom of Saxony, German Empire
- Died: 13 March 1986 (aged 86); Dresden, Bezirk Dresden, East Germany
- Occupation: Politician
- Political party: KPD; SED
- Spouse(s): ______; Alma Liddi Querfeld (1901-?); Anna (Anni) Jänicke (1905-1957); Käthe Martha Naumann (1915-1977)
- Children: Inge Taubert (1928-2009) and others

Walter Weidauer (28 July 1899 – 13 March 1986) was a German politician. He was the "lord mayor" (Oberbürgermeister) of Dresden during the most intensive period of the city's rebuilding, between 1946 and 1958.

== Life ==
=== Early years ===
Arno Walter Weidauer was born at the tail end of the nineteenth century in Lauter, a small town in the Kingdom of Saxony some 20 km (12 miles) from the German frontier with Bohemia which at that time was still part of the Austro-Hungarian Empire. His father worked from home as a weaver of punnets/baskets. He attended school locally and then between 1914 and 1917, undertook an apprenticeship as a carpenter. In 1918, the year of his nineteenth birthday, he was briefly called up for military service. He joined the Workers' Youth Movement in 1916 and in 1919 joined the Independent Social Democratic Party of Germany (Unabhängige Sozialdemokratische Partei Deutschlands, USPD) which had broken away from the Social Democratic Party of Germany (SPD /)Sozialdemokratische Partei Deutschlands) a couple of years earlier primarily, at that time, because of the mainstream party's continuing support for the war. Like many USPD party members he quit the party after a couple more years, and in 1922 switched to the Communist Party (KPD).

=== Carpentry, unemployment and politics ===
Between March 1919 and 1928 worked as a carpenter in Zwickau: there were also periods of unemployment and travel. Along with his membership of the KPD he was part of the local party leadership in Zwickau and also, from 1925 till 1928, a member of the regional party leadership in the nearby Ore Mountains district, a predominantly rural region interspersed with significant areas of commercial mining activity. In addition, between 1924 and 1928 he sat as a local councilor in Zwickau. From July 1928 he took on responsibility for the party's central publications operation on the other side of the country in Essen, a responsibility he retained till 1932. In 1929 Weidauer was elected leader of the Carpentry Trades Union in the Essen district, but he resigned three days later on account of "party factionalism" which was a feature of left-wing politics in Germany during the 1920s.

=== Reichstag member ===
In the general election of July 1932 the Communist Party won 14.3% of the national vote which entitled it to 89 seats in the Reichstag. One of those seats went to Walter Weidauer. In the next election which took place in November of that same year, the share of the votes going to the Communist Party increased a little, to 16.9%, and Weidauer remained a de facto Reichstag member till March 1933. By that time the focus of attention was fixed on the NSDAP (Nazi Party) which had taken power in January 1933 and lost little time in establishing one-Party government in Germany. March 1933 saw the third national Reichstag election in less than a year. In early February the Nazis, now in power, had "unleashed a campaign of violence and terror that dwarfed anything seen so far." Storm troopers began attacking trade union and Communist Party (KPD) offices and the homes of left-wingers, extending their violence to Social Democrats later in the month. When the votes were counted the Communist share of the vote was down to 12.3%, but Weidauer retained his seat under the rules then in force. Despite all their efforts in the run-up to the election the Nazi Party still failed to gain an overall majority of seats in the Reichstag. However, on 23 March 1933 they passed an Enabling Act, which in effect transformed the Hitler government into a legally sanctioned dictatorship. Political parties other than the Nazi Party were banned, and the Communist Party, as could have been predicted from Hitler's rhetoric over the previous decade, was at the top of the Nazi hit-list. March 1933 was Walter Weidauer's last month as a member of the national legislature. Later in 1933 he was detained in the recently opened Sonnenburg concentration camp.

=== Nazi Germany: exile and imprisonment ===
In 1934, on his release from the concentration camp, Weidauer undertook further work for the Communist Party, which now counted as illegal activity. During 1934 and 1935 he underwent further terms of "investigatory detention" in Schwarzenberg and Dresden. At the end of September 1935 he emigrated to Prague. In December 1936 he moved on to Denmark where, using the cover name "Karl Förster", he worked with the northern regional German Communist Party (now in exile). In April 1938, "in absentia", he had his German citizenship withdrawn. In April 1940 Denmark was occupied by the German army and Weidauer was interned. At the start of 1941 he was returned to Germany by the police and after a further period of detention on 3 June 1942 he was put on trial (briefly) in the People's Court (Volksgerichtshof), a special court set up by the government outside the constitutional frame of law and used for trials involving a widely drawn range of "political offenses". He received the conventional fifteen-year prison sentence for "Preparing to commit High Treason". For over three years he was held in a succession of prisons including those at Brandenburg-Görden, Waldheim and Leipzig. In February 1945, after the Destruction of Dresden, Weidauer was part of a Prisoners' Detachment moved to the city to help make a start on clearing the residual rubble. His detention was ended on 7/8 May 1945 when the Red Army arrived in Dresden.

=== Soviet occupation zone ===
The end of World War II, in May 1945, heralded a return to multi-party politics and on his release Walter Weidauer rejoined the KPD. The whole of Saxony now fell within the Soviet occupation zone of what remained of Germany. He also joined the local "Anti-Fascist Committee" for the Strehlen quarter of Dresden. The whole of the area was under Soviet Military Administration, and before the end of May 1945 Weidauer had been placed in charge of regional administration for Dresden-Leuben. On 5 July 1945 he became first deputy lord mayor of Dresden, serving at this time under "Lord Mayor" (Oberbürgermeister), Johannes Müller. In this position Weidauer enjoyed the support of the leading Communist party functionaries in Saxony, Hermann Matern and Kurt Fischer, which already gave him great power over city administration.

Weidauer's political approach was appropriate to the times. He justified his newly acquired power on the grounds that he possessed "proper political convictions" while condemning political opponents as reactionaries. The German Democratic Republic would be founded formally only in October 1949, but already the basis for a return to one-party government had created in April 1946, under Soviet administration, with the contentious merger between the old Communist Party and the Moderate-left SPD. Walter Weidauer was one of thousands of Communist Party members who promptly signed his membership across to the new SED (party) which would become the young country's ruling party under its ever more overtly Soviet style constitution.

=== Oberbürgermeister ===
In October 1945 Johannes Müller ceased to be Lord Mayor of Dresden, following a speech in which he had mentioned the difficulties of pursuing the rebuilding of Dresden while having to work in collaboration with the Soviet administrators. He was succeeded by Gustav Leißner who held the office for just over a year. At a time when mayoral responsibilities were focused on food and shelter, Leißner was an energetic administrator who tried to stand aside from the political parties, but this involved working with the major parties from both sides of the political spectrum, including the "bourgeois" parties, the CDU and the LDPD. The "bourgeois" parties appreciated a bipartisan approach, which nevertheless ran counter to the increasingly apparent agenda of the new Soviet sponsored SED.

At a City Council meeting on 10 October 1946 Walter Weidauer was elected Lord Mayor (Oberbürgermeister) of Dresden in succession to Gustav Leißner after the SED councilors had taken the meeting by surprise and withdrawn their support from Leißner. The new mayors most pressing priorities covered matters on which he had already been working such as police and personnel decisions along with rebuilding the city. In October 1947 a de-Nazification Commission was also established, over which Weidauer presided in person. He would be re-elected Lord Mayor and confirmed in office by the Party Central Committee in 1950, 1953 and 1957, resigning eventually in 1958 (possibly on health grounds).

"Socialist Dresden needs neither churches nor Baroque facades.”
"Das sozialistische Dresden braucht weder Kirchen noch Barockfassaden."

attributed to Walter Weidauer

"Not everything that was destroyed was beautiful. On the contrary, a lot of it should not reappear in its old form. No palaces for the rich and sheds for the poor, but democracy [needs to be] extended to home building.”
"Nicht alles war schön, was vernichtet wurde. Im Gegenteil, ein großer Teil darf in seiner alten Form nie wieder erstehen. Keine Paläste für die Reichen und Hütten für die Armen, sondern Demokratie auch im Wohnungsbau"

Walter Weidauer (1953)

High on the agenda during his early years in office was the ongoing clearance of wreckage and the rebuilding of the city. He had already, in January 1946, produced a paper entitled "1946, the first year of the great rebuilding" in which he set out a proposed political framework. There was a lively debate on the "rebuild or new build?" question. Weidauer himself was a proponent of "new build", and had no time for architectural treasures or the care of old memorials. He conducted a vigorous and long-running public argument with the Dresden art historian and conservationist Fritz Löffler on the issues involved. Nearly sixty years later Weidauer was still identified in an opinionated press report on the rebuilding of the Frauenkirche as a "concrete-headed communist".

Despite his own well known reservations about the nature and extent of Dresden's cultural and artistic heritage, Weidauer was the president of the government delegation that arranged for the recovery from the Soviet Union of Dresden's Old Masters' Gallery's artistic treasures (which had been placed in safe storage during World War II, but then confiscated by the Red Army in 1945). In connection with this he traveled to Moscow in August 1955 as part of a high-profile East German government delegation. Sustaining international contacts on behalf of his country's ruling party was important to Weidauer, who also visited West Germany as a representative of the Socialist "New Germany".

On 3 December 1958, with the agreement of the city council, Walter Weidauer resigned as mayor. He had already, on 29 November, accepted an alternative appointment as Dresden District Council Chairman in succession to Rudolf Jahn. However, on 21 January 1961 Weidauer was released from this office as well, on account of serious illness. This marked his retirement, although in the event he would continue to be politically active in less full-time capacities for many years. He remained a member of the Dresden city council till 1967. He also retained his position in the Dresden Party Leadership and district head of the AntiFascist Resistance fighters.

=== Power beyond the city limits ===
Beyond his responsibilities in the city itself, Weidauer also sat as a member of the regional legislative assembly (Landtag) for Saxony, where he chaired the "Communities Committee" from 1946 till 1952 when the regional assemblies and the regional tier of government were abolished in the German Democratic Republic: this was part of a process of concentrating power within The Party that had been under way since before the country's foundation three years earlier. Naturally he was also a member of the city and regional party leaderships. In addition, during the late 1940s and early 1950s Weidauer was a member of various community organisations and associations, propagating new theories of community politics, above all in opposition to the more parliamentary approach favoured by the despised "bourgeois parties". However, following the foundation of the state in 1949, the abolition of the regional tier of government in 1952, and the taming of the "bourgeois parties", community politics became ever less important.

During 1948/49 Weidauer was a member of the German People's Council and then, until its abolition, of the (provisional) Chamber of States (Länderkammer), a legislative chamber secondary in status and function to the more prominent People's Chamber (Volkskammer): the Länderkammer had already been largely sidelined some years before its formal abolition in 1958.

=== Retirement and death ===
After his retirement from full-time politics Walter Weidauer turned to historical research, focusing in particular on the destruction of the city in February 1945. He also found himself compelled to ideological confrontation of the "toxic role of German imperialism".

== Awards and honours (not a complete list) ==
Walter Weidauer died in Dresden on 13 March 1986, aged 86.

Publications (not necessarily a complete list)
- 1946, das erste Jahr des grossen Dresdner Aufbauplanes, Rat der Stadt, Nachrichtenamt, Dresden 1946.
- Die Verwirklichung des grossen Dresdner Aufbauplanes für das Jahr 1946. Stand d. Arbeiten nach dem ersten halben Jahr, Ratsdruckerei, Dresden 1946.
- Probleme des Neu- und Wiederaufbaus, Berlin 1947.
- Neue Wege der Kommunalpolitik, Voco, Dresden 1948.
- Das gesellschaftliche Leben in der modernen Stadt, Dresden 1955.
- Inferno Dresden - Über Lügen und Legenden um die Aktion „Donnerschlag“, Dietz, Berlin 1965, 8th edition Dietz, Berlin 1990.
- 1959 Hero of Labour
- 1964 Honorary Senator of Carl Gustav Carus Medical Academy
- 1969 Order of Karl Marx
- 1969 Honorary Citizenship of Dresden
- 1969 Martin Andersen Nexö Arts prize
- 1974 Patriotic Order of Merit Gold Clasp
- 1979 Grand star of People's Friendship

In July 1989 Dresden's City Hall Square was renamed "Walter Weidauer Square". 1989 and 1990 were years of political change, however, and on 1 October 1990, a couple of days ahead of formal reunification, the Square reverted to its former name.
