= 1989 East German local elections =

- 7 May 1989

Local elections were held in East Germany on 7 May 1989. They were notable for efforts by civil rights activists to observe the election results, which indicated that electoral fraud had taken place.

== Background ==
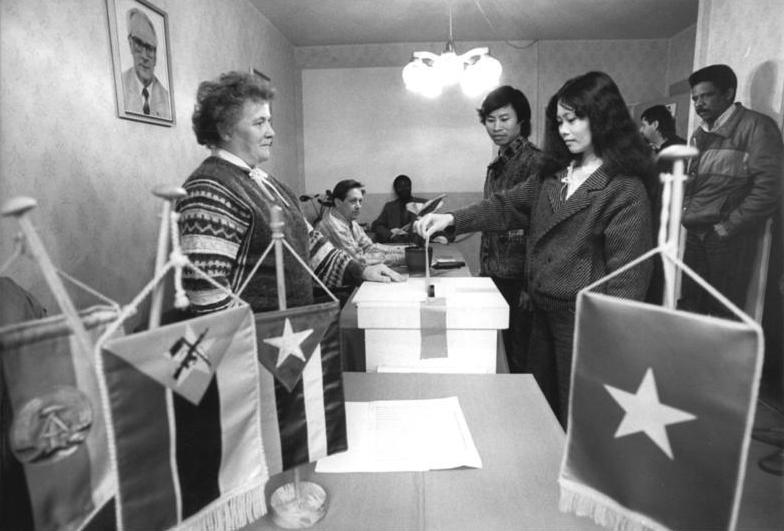
Immigrant workers casting their votes in Karl-Marx-Stadt.

In practice, there was no real choice in GDR elections, which consisted of citizens voting to approve a pre-selected list of National Front candidates. The National Front was, in theory, an alliance of political parties, but they were all controlled by the Socialist Unity Party (SED), which controlled the Volkskammer, the East German parliament. The results of elections were generally about 99% "Yes" in favour of the list. The previous local elections in 1984 were won by National Front candidates with 99.88%.

Before the elections, there were open signs of citizens' dissatisfaction with the government and the SED was concerned that there could be a significant number of "No" votes. The number of applications for an Ausreiseantrag (permission to leave the country) had increased and there was discontent about housing conditions and shortages of basic products. In the weeks before the election, opposition activists called for it to be boycotted, and distributed a leaflet criticising Erich Honecker's regime.

== Observation ==
Civil rights groups and citizens announced they would monitor the counting of ballots, as was allowed in the Constitution of East Germany. The Stasi observed but did not intervene. Hundreds of activists took part across up to 1,000 polling stations, and according to them, a sizeable portion of citizens voted against the National Front candidates. About 10 percent of voters had put a line through every name on the list, indicating a "No" vote, and about 10 percent of the electorate had not voted at all. In some areas the "No" numbers were even higher; for example in Berlin-Weißensee there were only 83 percent "Yes" votes, and up to 20 percent "No" votes were recorded in some precincts.

Despite this, the result of the election was proclaimed as 98.85 percent "Yes", which was still the worst ever result for the National Front. Clear evidence of electoral fraud was smuggled to the West German media. When this information was broadcast, it was picked up in East Germany, instigating protests. Election monitors from churches and other groups showed the figures had been falsified.

Church leaders and individuals also submitted petitions about electoral fraud to government agencies, though these were rejected as unfounded, and the Stasi initiated investigations against the filers for public defamation.

== Official results ==
1989 East German local elections
	Number	Percent
Eligible voters	12.488.742	100.00%
Votes cast	12.335.487	98.77%
Invalid votes	11.136	0.09%
Valid votes	12.324.351	99.91%
Valid "yes" votes	12,182,050	98.85%
Valid "no" votes	142,301	1.15%

== Aftermath ==
After the initial protests on 7 May, there were demonstrations on the seventh of every month in Alexanderplatz in Berlin.

Following the fall of the Berlin Wall, at least 20 criminal proceedings were initiated under GDR law for "election fraud and incitement to election fraud", and six of those involved were sentenced to suspended sentences, including local mayors and high-ranking SED officials.
