= Rudolf Paul =

German politician (1893–1978)

Dr. Rudolf Paul (30 July 1893 in Gera - 28 February 1978) was a German politician.

He studied law in Berlin and Leipzig and practiced as a lawyer in Gera. He was a member of the German Democratic Party until its dissolution in 1933. Under the Nazi Regime, he was banned from his profession.

Paul was appointed as mayor of Gera on May 7, 1945 by the American city commander. After the American retreat from Thuringia, the Soviet military administration appointed him as first Minister-President of the state on July 16, 1945. He became a member of the Socialist Unity Party of Germany in 1946. On September 1, 1947, he fled into the American occupation zone.

Paul features in the fourth part of the novel Berlin by the anti-Nazi German writer Theodor Plievier.
