= Rudolf Bahmann =

East German politician

- Born: 26 February 1929; Plauen, Saxony, Germany
- Died: 19 September 1977 (aged 48)
- Occupations: Politician; Council leasder (Gera)
- Political party: KPD; SED

Rudolf Bahmann (26 February 1929 – 19 September 1977) was an East German politician. Between 1973 and 1977 he served as chairman of the council in the Gera administrative district.

== Life ==
Bahmann was born in Plauen, an industrial town in the south-west of Saxony that had boomed in the nineteenth century. The decline of the German textiles sector after the First World War created particular economic and social hardship in the town during the 1920s, however. Bahmann's father was a farmer: his mother was employed as a sales assistant. Rudolf Bahmann attended school locally and then undertook an apprenticeship in agriculture on his parents' 13 hectare (32 acre) farm.

Following the Second World War, Plauen become part of the Soviet occupation zone. Communist Party membership was no longer illegal and Bahmann, now aged 16, joined the party. Also in 1945, he was a founder member of the Anti-Fascist Youth group in Gera, a short distance to the north of Plauen. As the Communist Party merged into the Socialist Unity Party of Germany (SED) in 1946, Bahmann became a SED member. He also, at this time, enrolled at the Agricultural College in Berga.

Between 1948 and 1950 Bahmann was employed by the regional party leadership in Thuringia as an instructor. He also attended the Agriculture Academy in Paretz and undertook a traineeship at the regional party academy in Bad Blankenburg.

In 1950/51 Bahmann was a Section leader, and then a Department leader, with the Thuringia party leadership. From 1952 till 1958 he served as Agriculture Secretary with the District Party leadership in Gera. He also sat, between 1954 and 1958, as a district councillor for Gera. However, in June 1958 he was abruptly relieved of his party posts following a "party procedure". He was now required to undertake a "probationary interlude in the production sector" ("Bewährungseinsatz in der Produktion"): he now, till 1959, worked as a tractor driver at the large district Machine and tractor station in Stadtroda, after which he took over as director of the Machine and tractor station Zeulenroda.

Between 1960 and 1963 Bahmann studied at the Karl Marx Party Academy in Berlin, emerging with a degree in Social Sciences. In 1963/64 he was the Agriculture Secretary for the Party District Leadership in Eisenburg, then serving as First Secretary for the Party District Leadership itself from 1964 till 1973. He also found time to undertake further study at the Stadtroda Agriculture College. becoming officially qualified as a farmer. Then from 1973 till his term was unexpectedly cut short he served as leader of the council in Gera.

He died in September 1977 following a road traffic accident.
