= Rudolf Friedrichs =

German politician (1892–1947)

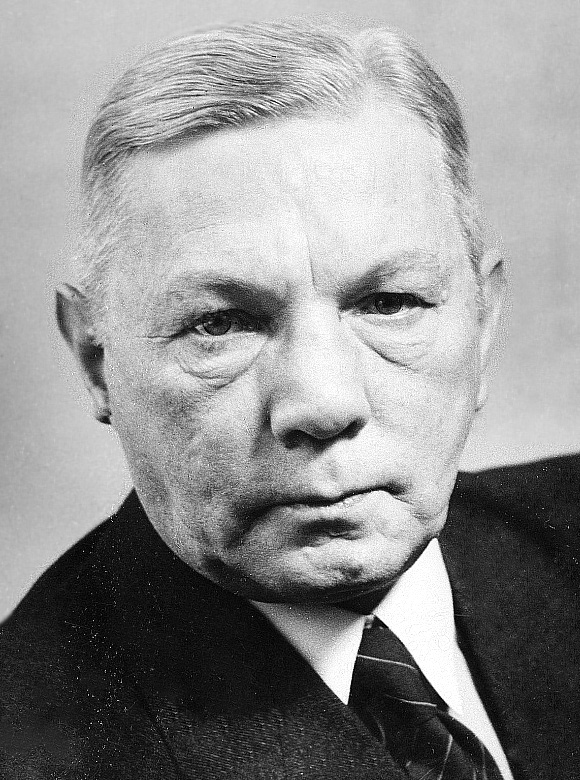
- Rudolf Friedrichs in 1945

Minister-President of Saxony
- In office 1 July 1945 – 13 June 1947
- Preceded by: Martin Mutschmann
- Succeeded by: Max Seydewitz

Personal details
- Born: 9 March 1892 Plauen, German Empire
- Died: 13 June 1947 (aged 55) Dresden, Soviet occupation zone
- Party: SPD (until 1946) SED (from 1946)

Rudolf Friedrichs (9 March 1892 – 13 June 1947) was a German politician who served as the Minister-President of the State of Saxony in Allied-occupied Germany from 1945 to his death.

== Biography ==
Friedrichs was born on 9 March 1892 in Plauen, Kingdom of Saxony, German Empire. He attended primary school in Plauen, but moved to Dresden for secondary school. He then began studying law and economics at Leipzig University until 1919, when his studies were interrupted by World War I. He joined the SPD in 1922 and worked from 1923 as a government assessor and from 1926 as a government councillor in the Saxon Interior Ministry. He was on the Dresden City Council from 1930 to 1933, when the Nazi Party seized power in Germany. He was relieved of his duties and was briefly detained. After World War II, he was appointed as Mayor of Dresden on 10 May 1945 by the Soviet city commander. There was tension between Friedrichs and the Communist Politician Kurt Fischer, which escalated in 1947 in the form of an open confrontation. This led to rumours of Fischer's involvement in Friedrichs' sudden death. A study conducted in 1999 by the government of Saxony couldn't confirm nor deny the involvement of Fischer in his death. The cause of death of Friedrichs was never clarified. He was buried at the Waldfriedhof Weisser Hirsch, then was reburied in the Municipal Heidefriedof in 1980.
