= Coat of arms of Dresden =

Coat of arms

- Armiger: Dirk Hilbert, Lord Mayor of Dresden
- Use: The state logo may be used by the general public while the coat of arms proper is only eligible for use with authorities.

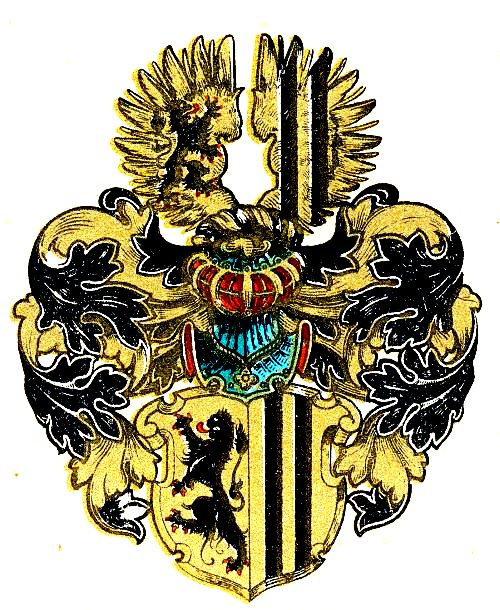
The arms of Dresden around 1920

The arms of Dresden first appeared on the seal of the city in 1309. The seal may pre-date the oldest existing documents about Dresden from the early 13th century. The arms that depict the lion of Meissen and the pales of Landsberg have ever since been used by the city. The original pales were probably blue, but were later converted to black. From the 16th century the arms were furnished with a helmet and mantling, but these fell in disuse at the beginning to the twentieth century.

== Blazon ==
Party per pale on a golden shield showing a black lion to dexter and two black pales to sinister. The lion is looking to dexter and has a red tongue. The city's colours are derivatively black and yellow (Or).

== Meaning ==
The lion represents the Margraviate of Meissen and the pales called the Landsberger Pfähle represent the March of Landsberg, both ruling the city of Dresden.

The coat of arms of Leipzig is very similar but has blue pales.
