= 1958 East German general election =

- 16 November 1958

400 out of 466 seats in the Volkskammer
- Turnout: 98.90% (▲0.49pp)
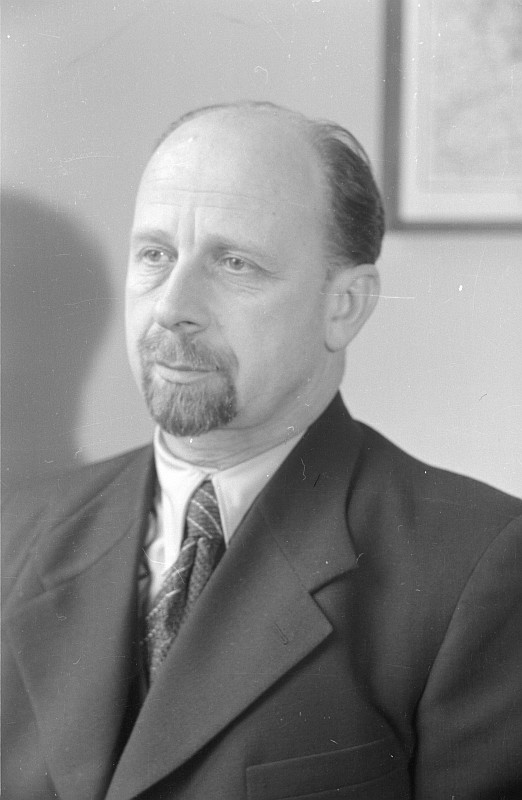
	First party
Leader	Walter Ulbricht
Party	SED
Alliance	National Front
Seats won	117
Seat change	Steady
Chairman of the Council of Ministers before election
Otto Grotewohl
SED
Chairman of the Council of Ministers after election
Otto Grotewohl
SED

General elections were held in East Germany on 16 November 1958. There were 466 deputies in the Volkskammer, including 66 from East Berlin who were not directly elected but appointed by the Magistrate of East Berlin. All were candidates of the single-list National Front, dominated by the Socialist Unity Party of Germany. The list received the approval of 99.9% of voters, with turnout reported to be 98.9%.

Like all East German elections before the Peaceful Revolution, this election was neither free nor fair. Voters were only presented with a closed list of candidates (pre-approved by the SED Central Committee Secretariat) put forward by the National Front. The list predetermined an outcome whereby the SED had both the largest faction in the Volkskammer and a majority of its members, as almost all of the Volkskammer members elected for one of the mass organizations were also members of the SED. While voters could reject the list, they would have to use the polling booth, the use of which was documented by Stasi informants located at every polling site, and had to cross out every name, as "Yes" and "No" boxes were removed after the 1950 election. Abstaining from voting was also seen as oppositional and punished. While legally permissible according to East German election laws, widespread election monitoring was not done out of fear for repression until the 1989 local elections.

== Results ==
Party or alliance		Votes	%	Seats	+/–
National Front	Socialist Unity Party of Germany	11,689,110	99.87	117	0
National Front	Free German Trade Union Federation	11,689,110	99.87	53	0
National Front	Christian Democratic Union	11,689,110	99.87	52	0
National Front	Liberal Democratic Party of Germany	11,689,110	99.87	52	0
National Front	National Democratic Party of Germany	11,689,110	99.87	52	0
National Front	Democratic Farmers' Party of Germany	11,689,110	99.87	52	0
National Front	Democratic Women's League of Germany	11,689,110	99.87	29	0
National Front	Free German Youth	11,689,110	99.87	29	0
National Front	Cultural Association of the GDR	11,689,110	99.87	18	0
National Front	Peasants Mutual Aid Association	11,689,110	99.87	12	0
Against		14,857	0.13	–	–
Total		11,703,967	100.00	466	0
Valid votes		11,703,967	99.88		
Invalid/blank votes		13,995	0.12		
Total votes		11,717,962	100.00		
Registered voters/turnout		11,848,602	98.90		
Source: German Federal Archives, Nohlen & Stöver
