= Werner Bruschke =

German politician (1898–1995)

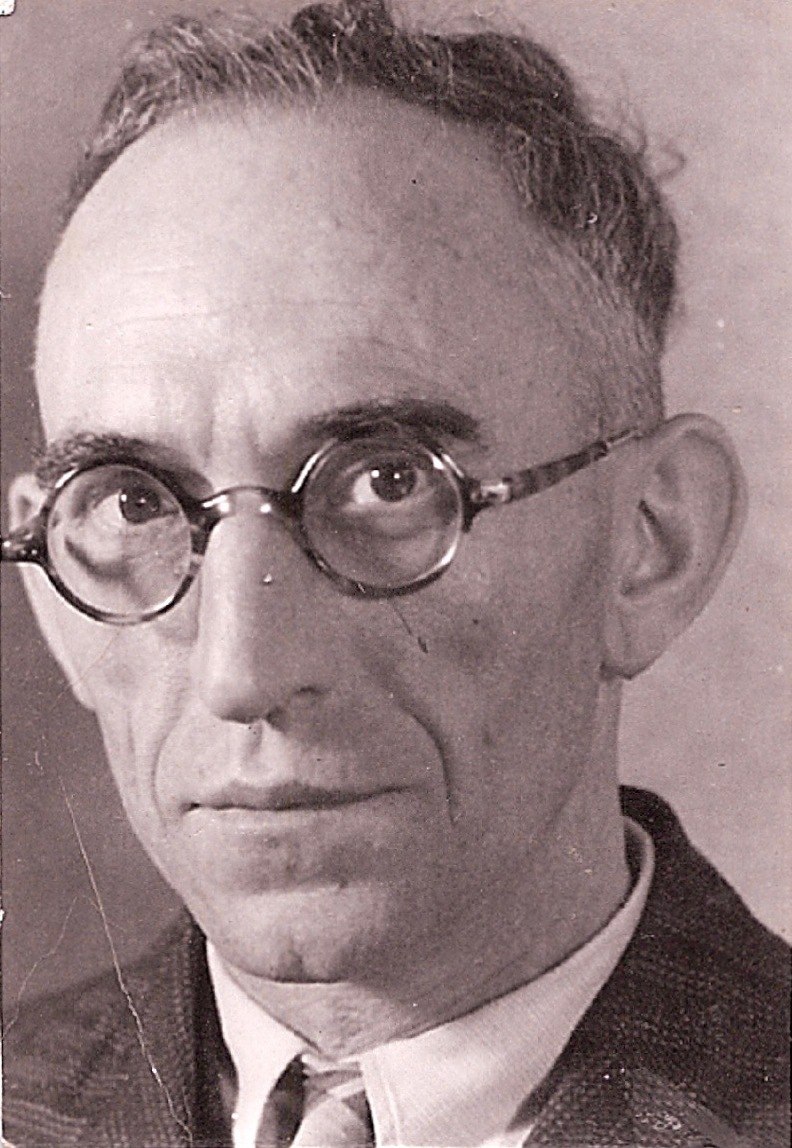
Werner Bruschke

Werner Bruschke (18 August 1898, in Magdeburg, Province of Saxony – 17 February 1995, in Halle (Saale)) was an East German politician and member of the Socialist Unity Party of Germany. He was Minister-President of Saxony-Anhalt (GDR) from 13 August 1949 until the state was abolished on 23 July 1952.

From 1933 he worked as tobacco goods dealer and later an insurance agent. After Hitler came to power, Bruschke, together with Ludwig Wellhausen and Ernst Lehmann, established an underground contact network for social democrats in and around Magdeburg. Due to his illegal political activity, he was accused in 1939 of treason (Landesverrat and Hochverrat) and from 1942 to 1945 was a political prisoner in the concentration camps Sachsenhausen and Dachau.

From 11 May 1992 to his death in 1995, he was the oldest former Minister-President of a German state, preceded in this by Bruno Diekmann.
