= Rudolf Jahn =

German politician (1906–1990)

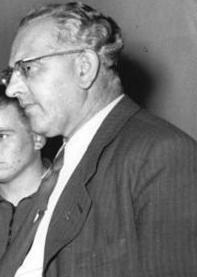
- Jahn (1953)
- Born: 4 November 1906; Paunsdorf near Leipzig, Saxony, Germany
- Died: 30 September 1990 (aged 83)
- Other name: Rudi Jahn
- Known for: Minister-President of Brandenburg

Rudolf "Rudi" Jahn (4 November 1906 – 30 September 1990), was a East German politician (KPD, SED) and Minister-President of Brandenburg (1949–1952).

== Biography ==
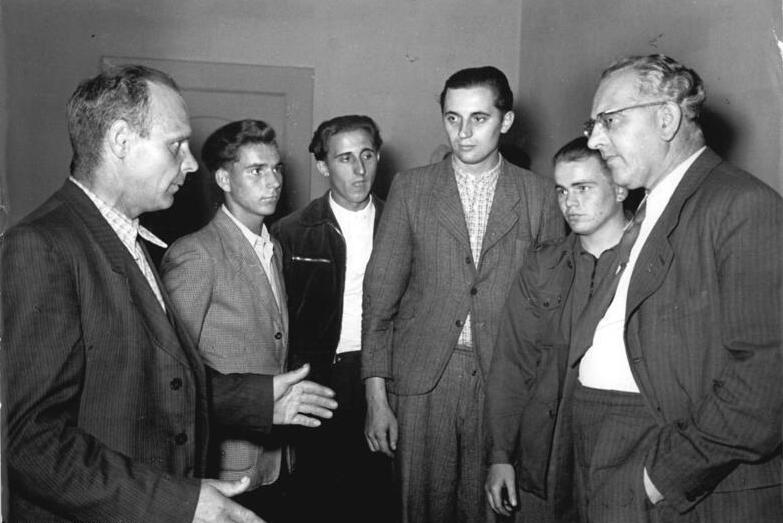
Jahn (right) in conversation with Saxon combine harvester operators (in July 1953)

Rudolf "Rudi" Jahn was born in Paunsdorf near Leipzig. His father was a metalworker. After attending elementary school, from 1921 until 1925 Jahn training as a construction and furniture carpenter. At the beginning of his apprenticeship, Jahn joined the Sozialistische Arbeiter-Jugend (SAJ, or Socialist Worker Youth).

In 1922 he became a member of the German Woodworkers' Association, and in 1923 a member of the Young Communist League of Germany (KJVD). Around 1924, he had two investigations for high treason due to his participation in the “Congress of the Working People” in Eisenach, and in the armed fighting during the "Bloody Sunday of Halle".

Between 1925 until 1928, Jahn traveled to Denmark, Switzerland, Sweden, and Yugoslavia. After he returned to Saxony, Jahn became a member of the Communist Party of Germany (KPD).

== See also ==
- List of leaders of administrative divisions of East Germany
