= Bernard Koenen =

German politician (1889–1964)

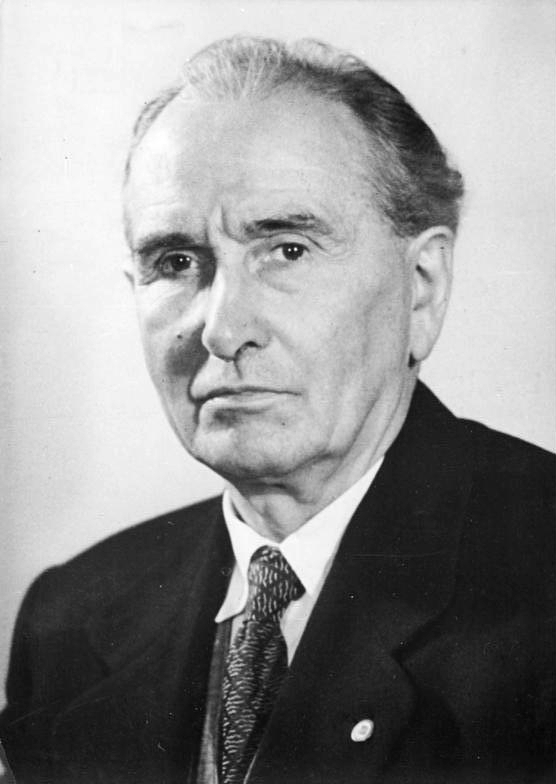
- Koenen in 1961

First Secretary of the Socialist Unity Party in Bezirk Halle
- In office April 1958 – 21 January 1963
- Preceded by: Franz Bruk
- Succeeded by: Horst Sindermann
- In office 1 August 1952 – 1953
- Preceded by: Himself (Saxony-Anhalt)
- Succeeded by: Heinz Glaser

East German Ambassador to Czechoslovakia
- In office 1953 – April 1958
- Preceded by: Fritz Große
- Succeeded by: Georg Stibi

First Secretary of the Socialist Unity Party in Saxony-Anhalt
- In office 7 April 1946 – 1 August 1952
- Serving with: Bruno Böttge (1946–1948); Werner Bruschke (1948–1949)
- Preceded by: Position established
- Succeeded by: Himself (Bezirk Halle); Franz Bruk (Bezirk Cottbus); Karl Schirdewan (Bezirk Leipzig); Alois Pisnik (Bezirk Magdeburg)
Parliamentary constituencies
Member of the Volkskammer for Halle
In office 16 November 1958 – 30 April 1964
Preceded by	Multi-member district
Succeeded by	Dieter Ziegler
In office 18 March 1948 – 17 October 1954
Preceded by	Constituency established
Succeeded by	Multi-member district
Member of the Landtag of Saxony-Anhalt
In office 18 November 1946 – 2 October 1950
Preceded by	Constituency established
Succeeded by	Multi-member district

Personal details
- Born: Bernard Johann Heinrich Koenen; 17 February 1889 Hamburg, German Empire
- Died: 30 April 1964 (aged 75) East Berlin, East Germany
- Resting place: Zentralfriedhof Friedrichsfelde
- Party: SPD (1907–1917); USPD (1917–1920); KPD (1920–1946); SED (after 1946)
- Spouse: Frieda Bockentien
- Children: Viktor; Alfred
- Relatives: Wilhelm Koenen (brother)
- Occupation: Politician; Trade Unionist; Machinist
- Awards: Order of Karl Marx

Military service
- Allegiance: German Empire
- Years of service: 1910–1912; 1914–1916
- Battles/wars: World War I
- Central institution membership: 1946–1964: Full member, Central Committee (Note: Party Executive Committee until 1950); 1943–1946: Full member, KPD Central Committee; 1923–1925: Member, KPD Central Commission; Other offices held: 1960–1964: Member, State Council; 1924–1929: Member, Prussian State Council; 1922–1933: Member, Landtag of the Province of Saxony; 1919–1933: Member, Merseburg City Council

Bernard Johann Heinrich Koenen (17 February 1889 – 30 April 1964) was a German communist politician and trade unionist who served in several legislative positions in the Weimar Republic and East Germany between 1919 and 1964. In the latter state, he also served as First Secretary of the Socialist Unity Party in Saxony-Anhalt from 1946 to 1952, in Bezirk Halle from 1952 to 1953 and again from 1958 to 1963, and as East German ambassador to Czechoslovakia from 1953 to 1958.

== Life ==
=== Early years ===
Koenen was born in Hamburg, the son of a carpenter-joiner and a cook. His father was a Socialist activist who participated in the founding of the Second International in Paris five months after his birth. By the turn of the century his father was a leading member of the Social Democratic Party of Germany (SPD). On 17 January 1906 they were among an estimated 80,000 people in Hamburg to take part in Germany's first ever mass-political protest march, protesting an electoral system which privileged the upper classes at the expense of the working class; Bernard Koenen distributed leaflets at the march.

On leaving school Koenen had embarked on an apprenticeship as a machine fitter and lathe operator, and in 1906 joined the German Metal Workers' Union. The next year he turned 18 and joined the SPD. His skills evidently made him readily employable and a period of travelling followed, taking in Lausanne, Brussels, Lille, and Tunisia, where, in Bizerte, he was among those who founded the Socialist Party in Tunisia. He undertook his military service between 1910 and 1912 and then returned to working abroad in industry. He was called up into the army in 1914, but released from military service in 1916 on account of "anti-military activities". By 1917 he had relocated to Leuna in Saxony-Anhalt where he worked as an electrician. In 1917 he joined the break-away Independent Social Democratic Party of Germany (USPD) which had split primarily on account of the mainstream SPD's continuing support for the war. During the November Revolution, Koenen was chairman of the works council at the Leuna Chemicals Plant where he was then working.

=== Weimar Germany ===
Koenen joined the recently formed Communist Party of Germany (KPD) in 1920, becoming a leading member of the party in the Halle-Merseburg region alongside his brother Wilhelm. In 1923 he joined the party's national organization commission. He served on the Merseburg City Council from 1919 to 1933, the Landtag of the Province of Saxony from 1922 to 1933, and the Prussian State Council from 1924 to 1929. Factionalism continued to be a feature of left-wing politics during the 1920s, and from the middle of the decade Koenen was identified with the so-called Conciliator faction (Versöhnler), which led in 1929 to his being relieved of some of his party offices by the party leader, Ernst Thälmann.

=== Nazi Germany ===
In January 1933, the NSDAP (Nazi Party) took power and set about establishing one-party government in Germany. Leading members of the KPD were particular targets. On 12 February 1933, during the course of the Eisleben Eisleber Blutsonntag (Bloody Sunday) Nazi propaganda march, several Communist leaders were killed; Koenen, however, was merely assaulted and badly injured by SA members, as a result of which he lost an eye. For the next few months, with a warrant out for his arrest, he was concealed in a private clinic by a doctor who was sympathetic to the communist cause.

=== Exile ===
In May 1933, along with several other fugitive communists, he managed to get to the Saarland, the only part of Germany still under foreign military occupation following the end of the First World War. In July 1933 Koenen emigrated to the Soviet Union, where he would remain until 1945. Initially he worked as the Organisation Secretary of the International Red Aid organisation. Then in 1937 he was caught up in Stalin's purges and detained by the NKVD until 1939, during which he was tortured. However, in 1940 he was again trusted to undertake assignments. Between 1941 and 1943 he worked for the "Deutschen Volkssender" ("German People's Radio") radio station, transferring in August 1943 to Radio "Freies Deutschland" ("Free Germany"). He started to work for the Soviet sponsored National Committee for a Free Germany in 1943, which was also the year in which he joined the Central Committee of the (exiled) KPD.

=== Postwar ===
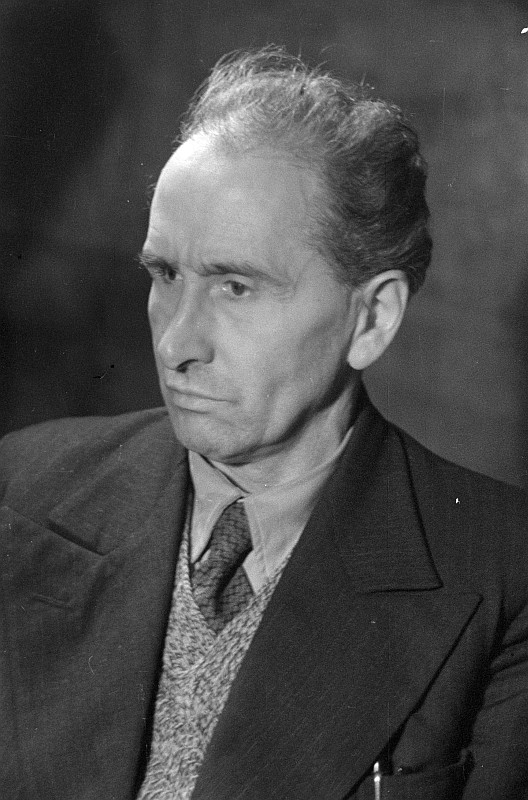
Portrait by Abraham Pisarek, 1946

Koenen returned in 1945 to the Soviet occupation zone in what remained of Germany. In April 1946 he became a founding member of the Socialist Unity Party of Germany (SED). The creation of the party came about through a contentious merger in the Soviet zone of the Communist Party and the more moderately left-wing SPD. The merger was in theory one of equals, but by the time the German Democratic Republic was formally founded in 1949 it was noteworthy that the positions of party influence and leadership were almost all held by men who, like Koenen, had been members of the KPD until 1946. With right wing policies discredited by twelve disastrous years of Nazi government, the de facto neutralising of the moderate left allowed a return to one-party government, but this time the template had been prepared, in some detail, in Moscow. During the late 1940s, Koenen worked as a party officer in the Halle region. Between 1946 and 1952 he was also a member and leader of the SED group in the Landtag of Saxony-Anhalt.

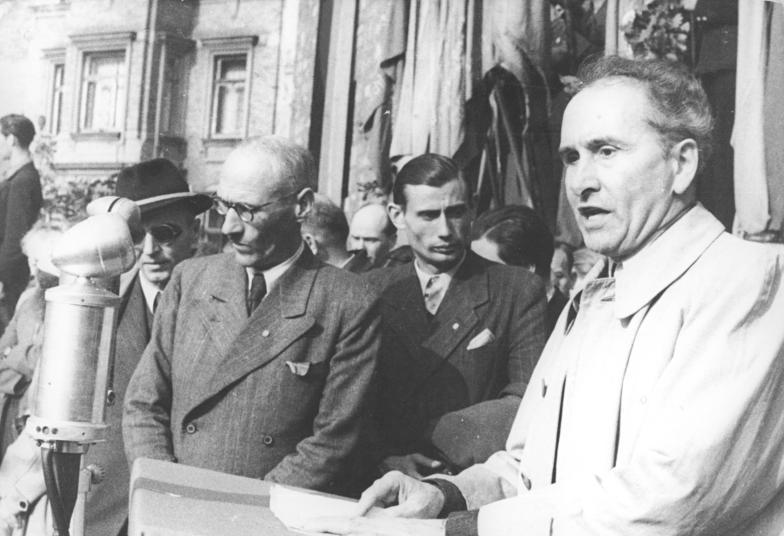
Koenen giving a speech in a city square in Halle to celebrate the birth of the German Democratic Republic, 8 October 1949

At the national level, Koenen was a member of the SED Central Committee from 1946 until his death in 1964. Under the Soviet system, on which the East German constitution was modelled, the responsibilities of government ministers were restricted to implementing the decisions of the Party Central Committee, while a Single List voting system ensured that the Volkskammer, the national legislature, was also controlled by the ruling SED (that is to say, by its Central Committee). In terms of power and influence Koenen's Central Committee membership was therefore of greater significance than membership of regional or national legislatures, though in practice there were plenty of Central Committee members who simultaneously held office in national or regional legislatures and/or as government ministers. Koenen himself combined Central Committee membership with membership of the Volkskammer, although it was reported that he had declined ministerial office in order to avoid having to cut back on party duties.

From 1946 to 1964 Koenen also held a seat in the National Legislative Assembly. However, in 1952 he lost his seat and leadership position in the regional legislature of Saxony-Anhalt when regional legislatures were abolished in the context of a wider programme of regional government reform. Partly as a consequence of those reforms, local and municipal councils became more important. Between 1952 and 1953, and again, in succession to Franz Bruk, from 1958 to 1963 Koenen served as First Secretary to the SED Regional Leadership (Bezirksleitung) in Halle.

From 1953 to 1958 Koenen was appointed as his country's ambassador to neighbouring Czechoslovakia, an important post, succeeding Fritz Große.

Between 1960 and 1964 he was a member of the State Council of East Germany.

Outside politics, he also worked as a teacher and journalist.

== Family ==
Koenen's elder brother, Wilhelm Koenen (1886–1963), was also a German Communist politician.

Koenen married Frieda Bockentien (1890–1968) during the First World War. Their sons Viktor and Alfred both joined the Red Army in order to fight Nazi Germany. Viktor (1920–1942) was killed over or in Poland in 1942. (There are conflicting reports as to how he died.) Alfred (1921–1995) survived the war and had a career as an army officer, and later as a diplomat.

== Awards and honors ==
=== East Germany ===
- Ernst Moritz Arndt Medal
- 1958: Medal for Fighters Against Fascism
- 1958: Medal for Participation in the Struggles from 1918 to 1923
- Johannes R. Becher Medal in Gold
- Patriotic Order of Merit in Gold and Silver
- 1959: Order of Karl Marx

=== Foreign ===
- Medal "For Valiant Labour in the Great Patriotic War 1941–1945"
- Order of the Banner of Labour
