= Fritz Große =

German politician (1904–1957)

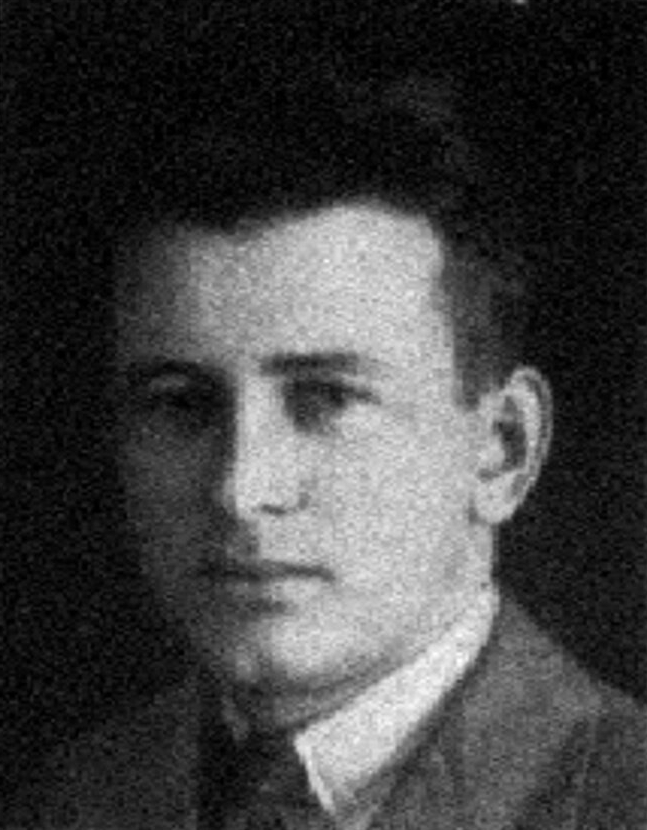
- Große c. 1932

East German Ambassador to Czechoslovakia
- In office 1949–1952
- Preceded by: Office established
- Succeeded by: Bernard Koenen

Member of the Reichstag for Potsdam I
- In office 6 December 1932 – 28 February 1933
- Preceded by: Multi-member district
- Succeeded by: Constituency abolished

Personal details
- Born: 5 February 1904 Altenberg, Kingdom of Saxony, German Empire
- Died: 12 December 1957 (aged 53) East Berlin, East Germany
- Party: KPD (1920–1946); SED (after 1946)
- Other political affiliations: CPSU
- Awards: Patriotic Order of Merit, in silver (1955)

Fritz Willibald Große (5 February 1904 – 12 December 1957) was a German communist politician and diplomat.

== Life ==
Große was born on 5 February 1904 in Altenberg. After completing his schooling, he worked as a carpenter between 1918 and 1920. In 1920, Große joined the Communist Party of Germany (KPD). In May 1920 he traveled to the Soviet Russia and enlisted in the 3rd Cavalry Corps of the Red Army and joined the Russian Communist Party. In 1921, Große returned to Germany, settling with his father in Chemnitz. In 1928, he would begin a relationship with Lea Große (née Lichter), and the two would marry in 1946. Große became a member of the Central Committee of the KPD in 1929.

From 1930 to 1932 Große was a member of the executive committee of Young Communist International. In November 1932, Große was elected to the Reichstag, a post he would hold until March 1933.

Große attended the secret meeting of the KPD at the Sporthaus Ziegenhals on 7 February 1933. With the Nazi seizure of power in Germany that year, he would go into exile. First he would travel to Prague, then to Moscow, Paris, and finally, Amsterdam. In February 1934 he returned to Berlin to work underground for the now-illegal KPD. In August 1934, he was arrested in Düsseldorf and in March 1936 he was sentenced to life in prison. From 1936 to 1945 Große was imprisoned, spending time in both the Brandenburg-Görden Prison and the Mauthausen concentration camp.

After being freed with the conclusion of the Second World War, Große traveled to Moscow, then returned to Germany alongside Wilhelm Pieck and Franz Dahlem.

Große was appointed as the first ambassador of the German Democratic Republic to Czechoslovakia. He held this office from 1949 to 1952, and was succeeded by Bernard Koenen. He then played a prominent role at the Ministry for Foreign Affairs, including building relations between the GDR and Yugoslavia in 1957. On 6 May 1955, Große was awarded the Patriotic Order of Merit, in silver.

Große's health had suffered greatly because of spending over eleven years in either a prison or a concentration camp. He died in Berlin on 12 December 1957.
