= Ernst Lohagen =

German politician (1897–1971)

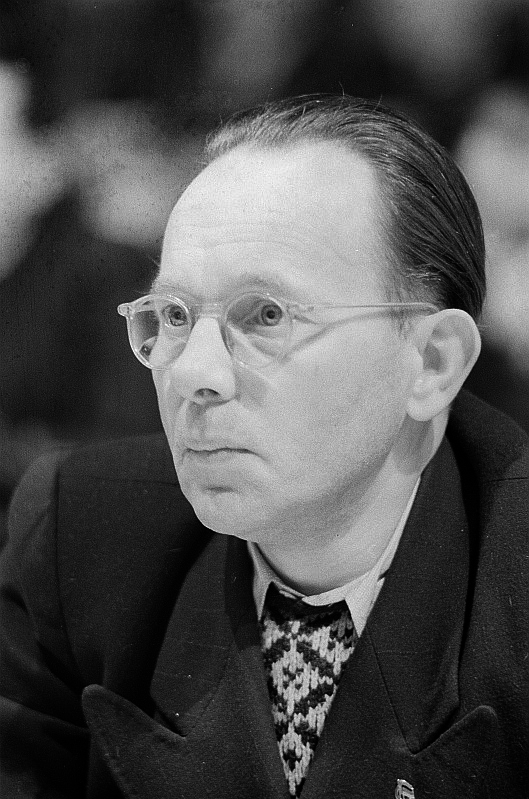
- Portrait by Roger & Renate Rössing, 1951

First Secretary of the Socialist Unity Party in Saxony
- In office 4 December 1948 – 27 June 1952
- Serving with: Erich Mückenberger (1948–1949)
- Preceded by: Otto Buchwitz; Wilhelm Koenen
- Succeeded by: Karl Schirdewan
Parliamentary constituencies
Member of the Volkskammer
In office 30 May 1949 – 23 July 1952
Preceded by	Multi-member district
Succeeded by	Karl Schirdewan
Member of the Landtag of Saxony
In office 22 November 1946 – 6 October 1950
Preceded by	Constituency established
Succeeded by	Multi-member district
Member of the Reichstag for Hesse-Nassau
In office 14 September 1930 – 31 July 1932
Preceded by	Multi-member district
Succeeded by	Multi-member district

Personal details
- Born: 12 May 1897 Elberfeld, Rhine Province, Kingdom of Prussia, German Empire
- Died: 2 November 1971 (aged 74) Bad Saarow, Bezirk Frankfurt, East Germany
- Party: KPD (1919–1946); SED (after 1946)
- Other political affiliations: Spartacus League (1916–1918)
- Spouse: Paula Niewöhner (m. 1926; died 1942)
- Occupation: Politician; Revolutionary; Activist; Journalist

Military service
- Allegiance: German Empire; Revolutionaries; Revolutionaries
- Branch/service: Imperial German Army; Ruhr Red Army; Antimilitärischer Apparat
- Years of service: 1916–1918; 1920; 1921
- Battles/wars: World War I; Ruhr Uprising; March Action
- Central institution membership: 1946–1952: Full member, Central Committee (Note: Party Executive Committee until 1950); Other offices held: 1924–1925, 1928–1931, 1934–1935: Political Leader, Hesse-Kassel KPD (Note: Hesse-Waldeck before 1929)

Ernst Lohagen (12 May 1897 - 2 November 1971) was a German communist politician, revolutionary and journalist. He was a member of the Reichstag from 1930 to 1932 and the Volkskammer from 1946 to 1952, although under the Marxist-Leninist power structure applied in East Germany it was his membership of the Central Committee of the Socialist Unity Party of Germany from 1946 to 1952 that was of greater significance.

He suffered a fall from grace in February 1952 and never recovered his former political influence.

A record of political activism meant that he spent most of the twelve Nazi years in state detention: Lohagen's wife was murdered in Auschwitz.

== Life ==
=== Provenance and early years ===
Ernst Lohagen was born in Elberfeld in the heart of the intensively industrialised Ruhr region. His father worked as a weaver, his mother as a leather worker. He attended school locally and then took work as an errand boy. After that, between 1911 and 1915, he was employed as a support worker and then as a packer in Elbersfeld.

He joined the Young Socialists ("Sozialistische Arbeiter-Jugend" / SAJ) in 1911 or 1912. War broke out at the end of July 1914, a couple of months after Lohagen's seventeenth birthday. The issue of whether or not to support it was from the outset intensely divisive for the political left in Germany. In 1915 Lohagen joined the "International Group", set up that year by Rosa Luxemburg to oppose the parliamentary votes that funded the war. The International Group turned out to be a precursor to a more widely based anti-war movement, the Spartacus League. Ernst Lohagen was a co-founder, in 1916, of a Spartacus League local group for the Elberfeld-Barmen region. He was nevertheless conscripted for military service, serving in the army from 1916 till 1918.

=== Weimar years ===
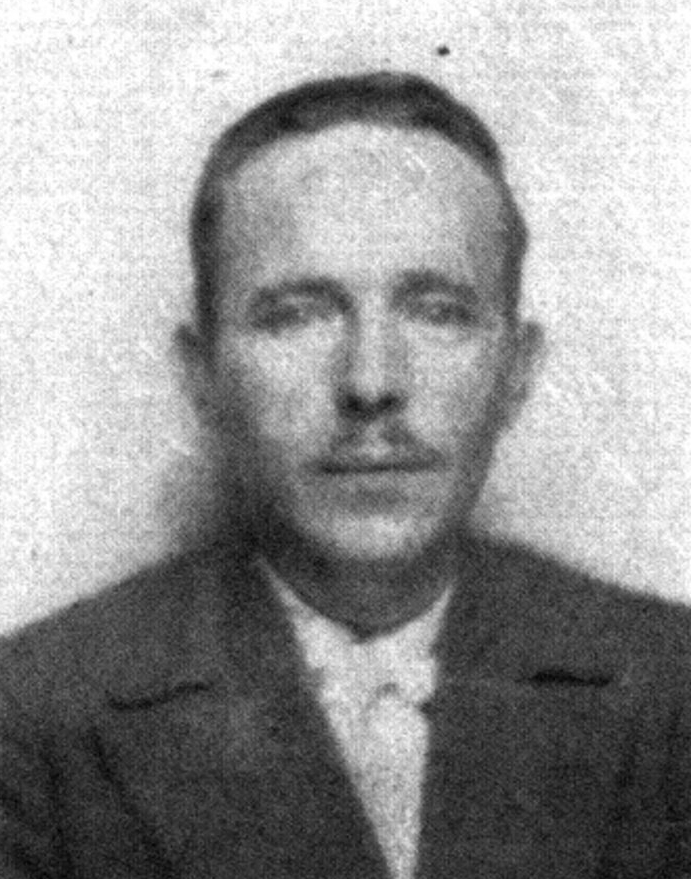
Lohagen's official Reichstag portrait, 1930

Following the German Revolution, the new German government signed the Armistice of 11 November 1918, bringing the war to an end. With hundreds of thousands of discharged soldiers returning from the frontline without jobs, centres of local government were taken over by workers' and soldiers' councils, sometimes identified by contemporaries (in a conscious reference to the emerging Soviet Union) as "Soviets". Lohagen was elected by local revolutionaries to be a member of the Soldiers' Council in Strasburg.

On the national political front, a rapid reconfiguration of the political left saw the Spartacus League subsumed into the newly formed Communist Party, of which Lohagen was a founding member. He also became a trades union member in 1918. During 1919/20 he became an organiser ("Orgleiter") with the "Free Socialist Youth" organisation for the party's Rhineland and Westphalia region. As the country continued to be ravaged by quasi-military groups, in 1920 Lohagen was a "staff member" of the Ruhr Red Army, set up as a response to the abortive Kapp Putsch. This led to his arrest in January 1921. (His Ruhr Red Army comrade Wilhelm Zaisser was arrested at the same time.) Lohagen was held for two months in a jail in the Welheiden quarter of Kassel. Two months later, in March, a "special war court" ("Sonderkriegsgericht") set up by the authorities in Kassel ordered his release. The background was one of widespread amnesties for participants in the post war unrest as the central government struggled to establish a measure of stability. Almost immediately, over Easter 1921, he took part in the so-called "March Action" in Wuppertal. After the authorities had succeeded in suppressing the uprising he fled to Berlin where till 1922 he lived illegally under a false name as "Peter Paulsen". It is recorded that in Berlin during 1921/22 he was an instructor there in the party's quasi-military "M-Apparat".

By 1923 he was back in Kassel, editing the "Arbeiterzeitung" ("Workers' Newspaper") for Hessen-Kassel. He was also, during 1923, secretary to the local party leadership team ("Bezirksleitung") for Hesse-Waldeck. In January 1924 he was returned to prison, serving his term in Kassel jail till September of that year. Following several further incidents of (mostly localised) serious street violence. the party had been placed under a ban towards the end of November 1923 and Lohagen's offence was "Violation of the Communist Party ban" ("Verstoß gegen das KPD-Verbot"). After 1924 there was some relaxation of the punitive war reparations régime imposed in 1919. The Hyperinflation crisis was successfully addressed and political tensions began to ease. The effect of the Communist Party ban was, on this occasion, relatively short-lived. Between 1924/25 and around 1931 Ernst Lohagen was the leading light of the Communist Party in the Hesse-Waldeck region. He was regional "Policy chief" ("Polleiter") and, from 1926, sat as a member of the regional parliament ("Provinziallandtag") for Hesse-Nassau. He also became a member of the Kassel District Council the next year. As the party was faced with savage internal ructions, Lohagen was firmly on the left wing of the party, and as the party moved towards a split he remained aligned with the Stalinist leadership. In February 1928 he was re-appointed to his position as party "Policy chief" ("Polleiter") for the Hessen-Kassel region.

In September 1930 he moved on to national politics, elected a member of the national parliament (Reichstag), where he represented the Communist Party for Election District 19 (Hesse-Kassel). Meanwhile, back in Kassel, in the middle of 1931, he was removed from all his party functions locally. Party comrades never found out why: his relationships within the party in Berlin and nationally were apparently unaffected. During 1932/33 he was working as an instructor with the (already illegal) paramilitary "Red Front Fighters" ("Roter Frontkämpferbund" / RFB), as a result of which he spent several weeks during November/December 1932 back in prison. He was released during one of the Hindenburg Amnesties.

=== Nazi years ===
Lohagen was not among those re-elected to the Reichstag in the election of May 1932. Nevertheless, overall electoral success by the Nazi Party and the Communist Party in that election left the parliament deadlocked, with mainstream parties refusing to enter into coalition with the extremist parties but unable to command an overall majority through any coalition that excluded them. A second election in November 1932 failed to resolve the situation. Through a well judged combination of guile and determination the Nazi Party took power in January 1933 and lost no time in transforming Germany into a one-party dictatorship. The consequences for Communists such as Lohagen were dire and almost immediate. His political activity, with which he continued, now became illegal: in April 1933 he was arrested and taken into "protective custody", initially near the Dutch border in the concentration camp at Neusustrum. In January 1934 he was transferred to the camp at nearby Börgermoor.

He was let out in April 1934 after signing a number of declarations which amounted to an undertaking to desist from further actions damaging to the state ("nicht mehr staatsfeindlich zu betätigen"), and returned to his role as regional "Policy chief" ("Polleiter") on Hessen-Kassel for the (now illegal) Communist party. In June 1935, together with his wife, Paula, he was re-arrested. Paula would be killed at Auschwitz in or soon after 1942 under circumstances that have still not (in 2017) become known. Ernst Lohagen remained in investigative custody till 1938. In January 1938 the special People's Court sentenced him to a fifteen-year prison term on account of his resistance activities. He remained locked up till April 1945 when the US army released him from the concentration camp at Lengefeld.

=== Soviet occupation zone ===
Lohagen now made his way to nearby Zwickau. It may be significant that he did not return to his former home region, which was now in the British military zone, but chose to remain in the central part of Germany now administered as the Soviet occupation zone. Party membership was no longer illegal and he devoted himself during the summer of 1945 to rebuilding the Communist Party in Zwickau and the surrounding Vogtland region. In August 1945 he became party chairman for Leipzig, a position he retained in the Socialist Unity Party ("Sozialistische Einheitspartei Deutschlands" / SED) following the contentious political merger in April 1946 that created what became, after October 1949, the ruling party in a new kind of German one-party dictatorship. Between 1948 and the start of 1952 he was regional chairman and first secretary of the SED in Saxony. He also sat between 1946 and 1950 as an SED member of the Saxon regional parliament ("Landtag"), where he succeeded Wilhelm Koenen as leader of the SED parliamentary group on 4 February 1949.

Nationally Ernst Lohagen was a member of the party Central Committee, the real fulcrum of political power in the country, from 1950 or earlier. The national legislature, the People's Chamber ("Volkskammer") was not at the centre of power in the way that a national parliament would have been in a western democracy, although in this respect the contrast between Soviet-style and western systems was to some extent obscured because Central Committee members were frequently also Volkskammer members. Ernst Lohagen became a member of the German People's Council ("Deutscher Volksrat") in 1949, and then, when the People's Council evolved into the People's Chamber, he became a member of that body, sitting for the SED. He served as chair of the parliamentary Budget and Finance Committee, and retained his place till the "announcement of the laying down of his mandate" which took place on 23 July 1952.

In February 1949 Lohagen came under attack in the western media on account of his "attitude during the Nazi years". The attack appeared to be based on information extracted by British intelligence services from recovered Gestapo files. Even western media pointed out that the timing of the western press attacks, coming apparently as a response to the complaints from the Soviet commander in East Berlin that in the parts of Germany under western military occupation the "denazification" process was being pursued with insufficient vigour, appeared strangely convenient. The attack was quickly and robustly refuted in Neues Deutschland, the party's mass circulation daily newspaper for the region becoming known as East Germany. The rebuttal appeared in the edition of 24 February 1949 under the headline "Gegen eine politische Verleumdung" ("Against a political defamation"). At the same time the Party Executive ("Partei Vorstand") took the opportunity to praise Lohagen's illegal (at the time) political work and blameless conduct during the Nazi years. Later that year, in the frenetic aftermath of the failed siege of Berlin, the Soviet occupation zone was relaunched as the Soviet sponsored German Democratic Republic, a new separated German state with its social, political and economic structures consciously modelled on those of the Soviet Union.

=== The fall ===
As a Central Committee member Lohagen was notable for the vigour with which he imposed "Stalinisation" in his own Saxony fiefdom. Stalinisation was the order of the day, and he was particularly savage in his attacks on the aging "right-wing" communist, Arthur Lieberasch, whom he described as a "professional enemy to the party" (als "professionellen Parteifeind"). It was therefore more than surprising that on 21 December 1951 Lohagen was himself heavily and sharply criticised in an article that appeared under the dry but damning headline "Comrade Lohagen suppressed self-criticism" (""Genosse Lohagen unterdrückt die Selbstkritik") in the Tägliche Rundschau, a newspaper published for East Germany between 1945 and 1955 by the ever present Soviet Red army bureaucracy. It was reported that when a man called Müller had published an article critical of Lohagen, Lohagen had reacted by relieving Müller of his post. Lohagen now responded to the critical article in Tägliche Rundschau with a public piece of "self-criticism", published in Neues Deutschland, which included an undertaking not to repeat his error.

That might have been thought an end to the matter. But then, on 22 January 1952, the Tägliche Rundschau produced a stinging polemnic against Lohagen. It came in the form of an open letter addressed to him and signed by Annemarie Allgeyer, a librarian from the small mining village of Beierfeld; but the withering content of the letter indicated that it had originated high up in the party power structure, an impression that was only strengthened the next day when it was reproduced in the mass circulation party newspaper, Neues Deutschland. "Your reply is disappointing, it sets a bad example and does little credit either to you or to the party" ("Deine Antwort ist enttäuschend, sie ist nicht vorbildlich und macht Dir wenig Ehre, geschweige denn der Partei"), wrote the letter writer.

It quickly became apparent that the affair was not simply about Lohagen. The publication of the Annemarie Allgeyer was the start of a wide-ranging campaign. On one hand it was a part of a continuing "cleansing of the party", which after 1948 affected the Socialist Unity Party, along with other Communist Parties in Central Europe. But it then developed into a savage power struggle within the party leadership during the course of which top party members sought to bring an end to Walter Ulbricht's dominance. In the event, of course, Walter Ulbricht would win, while several senior comrades who might have been seen as alternative leaders including, most notably, Paul Merker, spent the next few years in prison.

Various sources indicate that Ernst Lohagen was one of a number of casual scapegoats caught up in a long running top level power struggle, but that did nothing to ameliorate his position at the time. Although he accepted in print that "the criticism in the Täglichen Rundschau [was] a lesson and a help [for him]" ("die Kritik der "Täglichen Rundschau" eine Lehre und Hilfe für mich"), a number of further savage attacks against him appeared in the state controlled press. He tried again on 21 February 1952, accepting that his self-criticism to date had been "false and insufficient" ("falsch und unzulänglich") and accepting that he had made a succession of errors ("Kette von Fehlern") on account of a personality defect identified as "Selbstherrlichkeit". Not withstanding these renewed protestations of subordination, on 23 February 1952 Ernst Lohagen was excluded from the party Central Committee. Then, on 11 March 1952 Walter Ulbricht, give his opinion that "the business with Comrade Lohagen is not concluded" ("Die Sache mit dem Verhalten des Genossen Lohagen ist nicht abgeschlossen"). There is a suggestion that it was precisely because of his own hardline record of Stalinisation in Saxony that Comrade Lohagen's ordeal continued. In May 1952 he received a formal rebuke for "damage to the party and conduct unworthy of a leading official" ("parteischädigenden und eines führenden Funktionärs unwürdigen Verhaltens"). In June 1952 he was removed from the party regional leadership in Saxony and required, with immediate effect, to resign his seat in the national parliament ("Volkskammer").

=== After the fall ===
By this time a Central Committee decision had already been taken, in March 1952, to give Lohagen a new job as a "trainee overseeer" of the brown coal industry in the Ölsnitz-Zwickau district. That, reportedly, was announced as a three-year appointment. However, in January 1953 he was appointed to head up the Finance and Control department in the district of Potsdam, a position he retained till September 1955. Then from 1955 till 1958 he served as chairman of the district council for Pritzwalk.

In May 1957 Ernst Lohagen celebrated his sixtieth birthday and in June 1957 the National Party Control Commission ("Zentrale Parteikontrollkommission") cancelled or expunged his penalties. There were no more public sector jobs for the "Labour veteran" ("Arbeiterveteran"), but he did work on an unpaid basis for the Marxism–Leninism Institute for some years starting in 1961.

Ernst Lohagen died at Bad Saarow, a health spa to the east of Berlin, on 2 November 1971. His body was buried in the "Grove of Honour" in the Southern Cemetery at Leipzig.

== Awards and honours ==
- 1967 Banner of Labor
- date unknown Patriotic Order of Merit in gold

== Personal: Paula Lohagen ==
Ernst Lohagen was married to Paula Niewöhner (1897–1942). The marriage was childless. The date of the marriage is unknown, but it is likely that it took place in or after 1926 which is when Paula moved to Kassel.

Paula Lohagen was born into a politically aware (Social Democrat) family on 17 January 1897 in Herford, a midsized town a short distance to the north of Bielefeld. She joined the Young Socialists when she was 14 and the Communist party in 1920. She played an important part in creating the Communist youth organisation in the Ruhr district. From 1926 she lived in Kassel where she was a member of the party regional leadership team ("Bezirksleitung") for Hesse-Waldeck. During the Weimar years she was arrested on several occasions because she spoke out on the dangers of Fascism. She remained in Kassel after the Nazis took power at the start of 1933, and played a leading role in organising anti-Fascist actions by Communists in the region. After the Communist Party was banned she worked in a resistance group and organised illegal political activity, which she undertook together with workers at the Henschel factory, which was an important production centre for railway locomotives and trucks. She held regular meetings with Henschel workers' at the former sports hall of the plant sports club.

In 1935 Ernst and Paula Lohagen were living in Kassel at "Gartenstraße 27" ("Garden Street 27"). They were both arrested by Gestapo officers in June 1935. She was sentenced to a three-year jail term which she served at Ziegenhain. From there she was transferred to Ravensbrück concentration camp. It is not known at what point she was transferred again, this time to Auschwitz. Her last communication came from Auschwitz shortly before Christmas 1942. It was a card which she sent to her parents, living by this point in Bielefeld. It included a mildly reassuring message:

- "You must not worry on my account, here it's ... so far so good..."
- ("Meinetwegen dürft ihr euch keine Sorgen machen, mir geht es so weit noch gut…")

Nothing further was heard of Paula Lohagen. It is believed that she was murdered soon after writing that message.
