= Karl Schirdewan =

German politician (1907–1998)

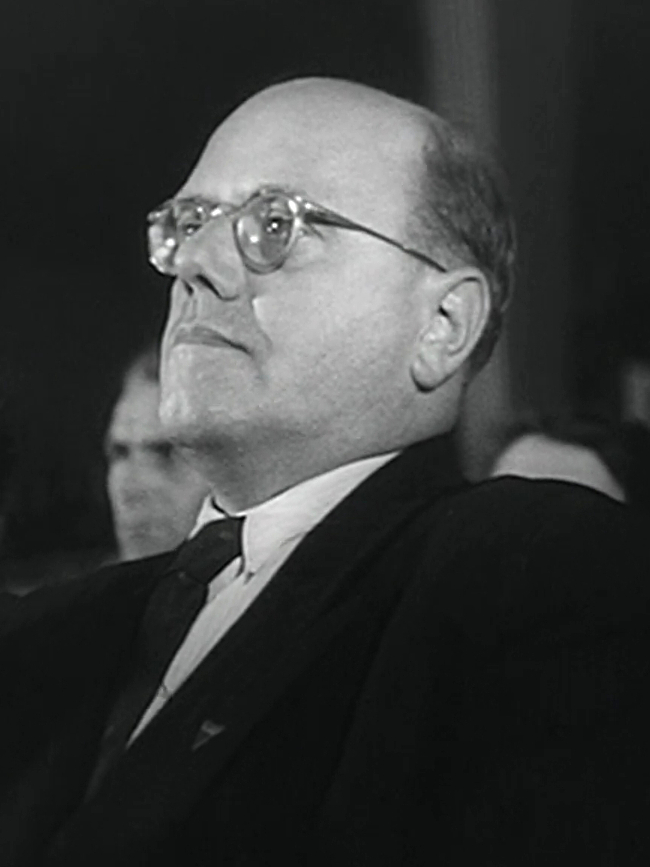
- Schirdewan in Wilhelm Pieck – Das Leben unseres Präsidenten, 1952

First Secretary of the Socialist Unity Party in Bezirk Leipzig
- In office 26 July 1952 – December 1952
- Second Secretary: Luise Bäuml
- Preceded by: Himself (Saxony)
- Succeeded by: Paul Fröhlich (1953)

First Secretary of the Socialist Unity Party in Saxony
- In office 27 June 1952 – 26 July 1952
- Second Secretary: Gerda Meschter
- Preceded by: Ernst Lohagen
- Succeeded by: Himself (Bezirk Leipzig); Hans Riesner (Bezirk Dresden); Walter Buchheim (Bezirk Karl-Marx-Stadt)

Member of the Volkskammer
- In office 23 July 1952 – 24 February 1958
- Preceded by: Ernst Lohagen
- Succeeded by: Harry Bachmann

Central Committee Secretariat responsibilities
- 1956–1958: Cadre Affairs
- 1953–1958: KPD Work Office
- 1953–1958: West
- 1953–1958: Women
- 1953–1958: Youth
- 1953–1955: Neuer Weg editorial team
- 1952–1956: Leading Party Organs and Mass Organizations

Personal details
- Born: 14 May 1907 Stettin, Province of Pomerania, Kingdom of Prussia, German Empire (now Szczecin, Poland)
- Died: 14 July 1998 (aged 91) Potsdam, Brandenburg, Germany
- Party: KPD (1925–1946); SED (1952–1989); PDS (1989–1998)
- Spouse: Gisela Schirdewan
- Children: 4
- Relatives: Martin Schirdewan (grandson)
- Occupation: Politician; Civil Servant; Party Clerk
- Awards: Patriotic Order of Merit, 1st class
- Central institution membership: 1953–1958: Full member, Politburo of the Central Committee; 1953–1958: Full member, Central Committee; Other offices held: 1958–1965: Director, State Archives Administration; 1954–1957: Member, Security Commission at the Politburo; 1950–1952: Head, West Department of the Central Committee

Karl Schirdewan (14 May 1907 – 14 July 1998) was a German anti-fascist activist who after World War II became a high-ranking politician of the SED, later becoming disgraced for his outspoken critique of the party from a communist perspective.

During the mid 1950s, Schirdewan was seen as a potential successor to Walter Ulbricht but fell out of favour in 1958. Ulbricht continued to lead the government until 1971, while 1958 was the year in which Schirdewan was thrown out of the Politburo and placed in charge of the National Archives at Potsdam, a position from which he retired in 1964 or 1965. He would only be rehabilitated by the SED's successor party, the PDS, after the Wende.

== Biography ==
=== Early years ===
Schirdewan was born in Stettin, an industrial port city which at that time was the capital of the Prussian Province of Pomerania. His mother's name was Josephine Arentz. His father's identity is unknown, but interviewed in 1994 Schirdewan stated that he believed his father had died shortly after his own birth. Karl Schirdewan spent time living in an orphanage and then moved through a succession of foster families. He acquired the name by which he was subsequently identified when he was adopted by Robert and Martha Schirdewan in 1914. His step-parents both worked, in administrative/custodial capacities, at the Botanical Institute in Breslau, but in 1918 his step-mother died of tuberculosis, and his relationship with his step-father's new wife never became close. Karl Schirdewan left school when he was 16 and looked, without success, for work in a book shop. He then, in 1922, began a commercial apprenticeship with a grain company: this occupied him till 1924 when the company went bankrupt. Later, between 1926 and 1929, he worked as an office assistant and as messenger. At one stage he was employed as a transport worker, and there were also periods of unemployment, notably between 1929 and 1931.

=== Communist Party of Germany ===
On the political front, Schirdewan joined the Young Communist League (KJVD) in 1923, aged 16, and the Breslau branch of the Communist Party itself in 1925. Between 1925 and 1927 he was employed with the KJVD as an official, in September 1929 voted onto the organisation's central committee, and appointed chairman of the Silesian regional Communist Party branch. In 1931/32 he took over the publishing department of the party's "Junge Garde" newspaper, also becoming co-editor; this represented his first senior party position.

Following feuding within the local communist leadership, Friedrich Schlotterbeck and Karl Schirdewan were relieved of their party functions in Silesia in the autumn of 1931; Schierdewan subsequently took over as chairman of the KJVD in the important East Prussia region. He returned to Berlin at the end of 1932, and became head of the KJVD's Antimilitärischer Apparat.

=== In the KPD Underground and Concentration Camps - 1933-1945 ===
In January 1933, Hitler became Chancellor of Germany and the NSDAP officially came to power. This opened the way for a rapid transition to one-party dictatorship. In March of that year emergency legislation enabled the government to act without reference to the Reichstag (national parliament). This followed the Reichstag Fire, which the Nazi regime used as a pretense to round up hundreds of thousands of political opponents into the first concentration camps. Membership of the Communist Party became illegal, with all other political parties, trade unions, and many social organizations also outlawed within the year. Karl Schirdewan nevertheless continued with his (now illegal) party activities in Saxony and in the north of Germany. On 19 February 1934, he was arrested in Hamburg and taken to Berlin's "Columbia House" concentration camp. On 10 May 1934, he was sentenced by the special "People's Court" to three years in prison: the charge was the usual one under the circumstances of "conspiracy of high treason" ("Vorbereitung zum Hochverrat"). He served his sentence at Coswig, near Dresden. In 1937, his sentence served, Karl Schirdewan was taken into "protective custody." He remained imprisoned until the end of the war and the fall of the Nazi regime in 1945, spending most of his time in the concentration camps Sachsenhausen and Flossenbürg concentration camps. On 23 April 1945, he was freed by US forces while on a forced march, as the regime abandoned and rushed to try and destroy concentration camps in eastern parts of the country, which were being over-run by Soviet forces.

=== Post-war Soviet occupation zone ===
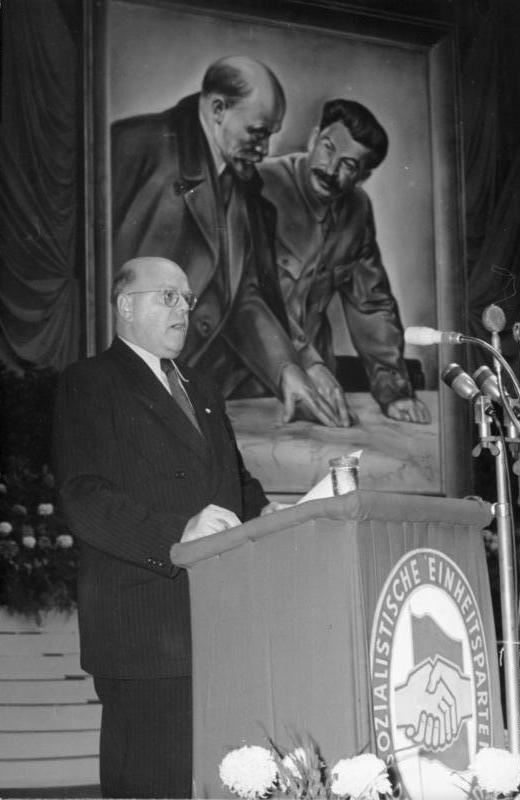
Schirdewan gives a speech at the Friedrichstadt-Palast in East Berlin commemorating the 36th anniversary of the October Revolution, 6 November 1953

The Second World War ended, in Europe, in May 1945. Schirdewan resumed his work for the Communist Party, in June 1945 re-establishing and starting to build up the party branch in northern Bavaria. Two months later, in August, he joined the Berlin-based Party Central Committee. Directly following the contentious merger that in April 1946, created the Socialist Unity Party (Sozialistische Einheitspartei Deutschlands / SED), he was a member of the leadership committee ("Parteivorstand") of what by 1949 would become the ruling party in a new German one- party dictatorship. During 1946/47, however, his political engagement was unavoidably compromised by illness, as a result of which a stay in a Berlin Hospital was followed by a period in the Sülzhayn Sanatorium.

In 1947, he became the leader of a working group on the "Study of illegal party history" ("Studium der illegalen Parteigeschichte"), mandated to gather information on the attitudes of party comrades to the Nazi period. In practice, as Schirdewan later recalled, the group's work involved combing through Gestapo files to gather information on anti-fascists - Communists and Socialists - who had been targets for government information gathering during the twelve Nazi years. The information would be used after 1949 in support of political purges of the SED. In January 1949, when party membership had reached 1,773,000, the party was purged of 23,000 "class enemies", in an exercise which evidently made use of the work undertaken by Schirdewan's working group.

When the SED party was created in the Soviet occupation zone in 1946 through a merger of the Communist Party and the more moderately left-wing SPD, the intention in Moscow seems to have been to accomplish something similar in the other military occupation zones further to the west and south. In (East) Berlin the SED operated, from the outset, a "West Germany" desk headed up by Franz Dahlem. Two senior officials with suitable diplomatic and intellectual abilities worked for Dahlem on liaison with the residual Communist Party in the British and US occupation zones. Schirdewan was the man entrusted with liaison in the British zone. By 1949, however, it was becoming clear that imposing a Soviet-style solution across the western zones of Germany would not be possible without successful prosecution of another major war, and as the party structures adapted to this reality it was no more than part of a natural progression that in February 1949 Karl Schirdewan was appointed as deputy head of the "Westkommission", described by one authority as an operation "looking for ways to win over West German politicians for the Communist cause". In 1950 he was appointed to head up the newly "West department" (Westabteilung) within the Party Central Committee.

=== German Democratic Republic ===
In October 1949, partly in response to the creation of the German Federal Republic (West Germany) five months earlier, Germany's Soviet administered zone was relaunched as the German Democratic Republic (East Germany), a stand-alone Soviet sponsored German states with constitutional arrangements increasingly modeled on those of the Soviet Union itself. Schirdewan's experience on the political front-line with West Germany and his Central Committee responsibilities for the "West Department" effectively made him the leader of the East German ruling party's on-going Social Democratic Action Sozialdemokratische Aktion / (SDA) project.

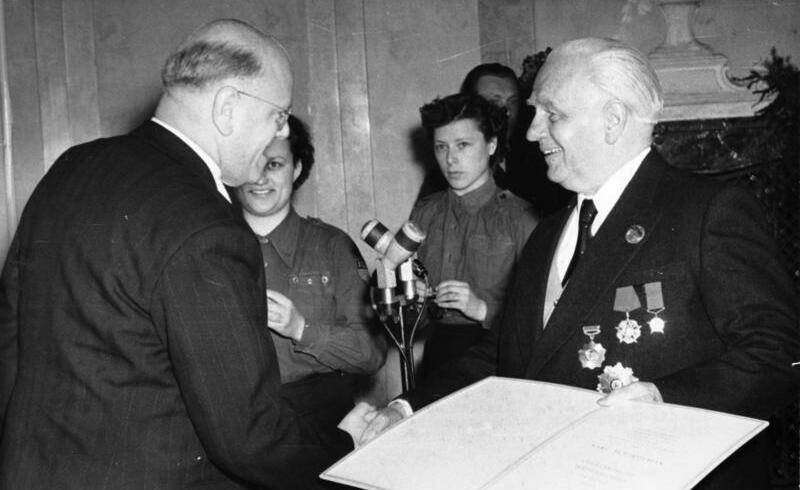
On 6 May 1955, in a ceremony timed to honour the tenth anniversary of the "Liberation from Fascism", Karl Schirdewan was an early recipient of the Patriotic Order of Merit (Vaterländischer Verdienstorden) in Gold from president Wilhelm Pieck in recognition of his "struggle against Fascism and his contributions to the creation of the German Democratic Republic"

1952 was the year in which the German Democratic Republic abolished the regional tier of government, and it was the year in which Karl Schirdewan was appointed First Secretary of the party leadership in Saxony in succession to Ernst Lohagen. With the abolition of Saxony as a regional power hub politically, later that year he became First Secretary of the party leadership in the important Leipzig region, a post he held till 1957. Nationally, although he had been working closely with the Party Central Committee since the party's foundation, it was only in May 1953 that Karl Schirdewan was himself co-opted as a member, following the disgrace and expulsion from it of Wilhelm Zaisser and Rudolf Herrnstadt, on 17 June 1953 also taking Zaisser's place in the Politburo. He now acquired various further powers and responsibilities, serving from 26 July 1953 as head of the Central Committee's newly created "Chief Organ of the Party and of Mass Movements" ("Leitende Organe der Partei u. der Massenorganisationen"), and from 1954 as a member of the Central Committee's "Security Commission".

The mid 1950s were the high point of Karl Schirdewan's political career. Sources refer to him as the "Second Man" ("zweiter Mann"), second only to Walter Ulbricht in the national hierarchy. It was always obvious to him, as he later recalled, that he had achieved his eminence because of the Soviet Union and not because of Walter Ulbricht. The two men loathed one another. Schirdewan described Ulbricht as a "happy intriguer" ("Intrigant Fröhlich") and was known to have been close to senior East German politicians, such as Anton Ackermann and Paul Merker, who had experienced enforced career-breaks or worse, after falling out with Ulbricht.

=== Relations with Nikita Khrushchev ===
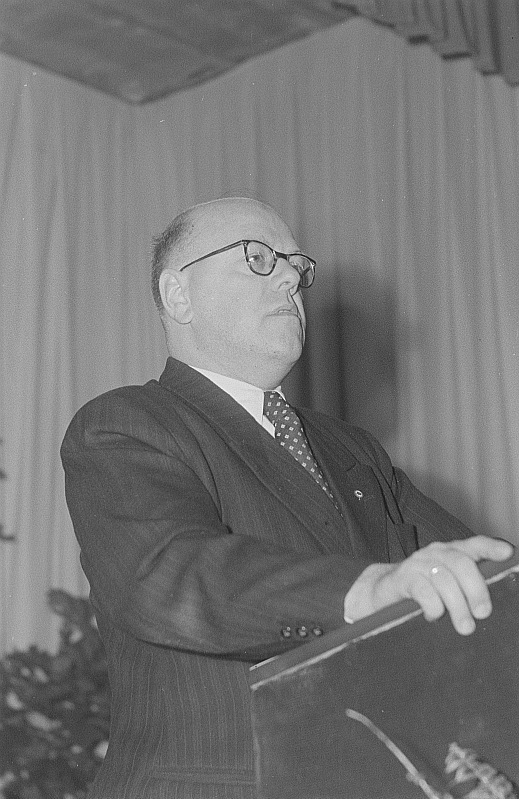
Schirdewan gives a speech, 1952

Schirdewan was a member of the four man delegation sent by the East German SED (party) to the 20th Congress of the Soviet Communist Party, held in Moscow, starting during the third week of February 1956. The other delegates from Berlin were Walter Ulbricht, Otto Grotewohl and Alfred Neumann. The 20th Congress is remembered by historians for a speech entitled "On the Cult of Personality and Its Consequences" in which the Soviet leader, Nikita Khrushchev, spelled out in considerable detail the errors of his predecessor, Joseph Stalin. The speech was delivered after the formal business of the congress had been concluded, during the evening of 24 February 1956, and because it was a long speech it was still being delivered during the early hours of 25 February 1956. It was delivered to a closed session of senior party members: press reporters and delegates' guests were excluded. Its contents leaked out only slowly. Nevertheless, long before 1989 when the text was officially published, Khrushchev's "secret speech" had become one of the most famous speeches in history. Back in 1956 congress delegates were permitted to view copies, and Schirdewan was entrusted by his fellow delegates with the task of creating a note of it, using the German translation which Kremlin officials had helpfully prepared. It was clear to Schirdewan, as it must have been to many delegates, that Khrushchev's speech opened up huge risks both for his own career and for the future political direction of the Soviet Union and of "Communist" Central Europe. Admitting to the scale of Stalin's crimes against humanity and implicitly destroying the old Stalinist certainties: it appeared to open to way to a form of communist state more open to progress and less dependent on repression, which for Schirdewan was clearly part of Khrushchev's calculation. While Schirdewan was open to such possibilities his fellow East German delegates, taking their queue from Ulbricht, reacted with horror to the possibility that new political trends in Moscow might be emerging to threaten the stranglehold that the communist states such as East Germany held over their people.

"Die SED wurde durch die Verteidigung des Stalinismus dem Verfall preisgegeben. Ihr Versagen vor der Geschichte ist nicht zu überbieten. Ein demokratischer Sozialismus hätte auf dem Programm dieser Partei niemals stehen können. Diese SED mußte erst zerschlagen werden, um ein freies Denken zu ermöglichen und eine Partei zu schaffen, die die sozialistischen Grundsätze ausreifen läßt und befolgt."

Karl Schirdewan 1994

"The SED descended to ruin by defending Stalinism. Their failure to recognise historical reality could not have been more absolute. A democratic form of socialism could never have been included in this party's programme. In order to make free thought possible and to create a party able to build and follow socialist principles, it was necessary first to destroy the SED."

"Eine politische Dekadenz breitete sich aus. Es war wie eine Inquisition aus dem Mittelalter.Die politische Unkultur, wie sie wohl so niemals in der Parteigeschichte stattgefunden hatte, wucherte bis zum Exzeß."

Karl Schirdewan

"Political decadence took hold [of the SED]. It was like an inquisition from the Middle Ages. An excess of political barbarism, probably unprecedented in the party's history, grew out of control."

=== "Secret Speech" ===
Khrushchev's wish to open up the Soviet past to scrutiny was in stark contrast with Walter Ulbricht's approach, and tensions between the two leaders over this, and over Khrushchev's determination to improve access to West Berlin from West Germany, provide a defining backdrop to Schirdewan's own career between 1956 and 1958. Following the Secret Speech, divides seem to have opened up between reformers and hardliners in the politburos of various countries, including the Soviet Union itself, with the hardliners generally outnumbering the reformers. The obvious personal tensions in Ulbricht's relations with his Soviet counterpart nevertheless encouraged East German Politburo members with reformist tendencies to contemplate a scenario under which Soviet pressure, manipulative skills, and simple power might enforce the replacement of Ulbricht, which is indeed what happened when Erich Honecker took over from Ulbricht in 1971. In 1957, talk of Schirdewan as Ulbricht's potential successor merely intensified Ulbricht's discretely frenetic counter-scheming in order to block such a possibility.

Although the speech itself remained secret, on 5 March 1956, Khrushchev distributed a written account of Stalin's crimes to the 18 million Soviet citizens who were also Communist Party members, and who now discovered that their idol was a mass murder (at least, according to his successor). Reactions in the Soviet Union were mixed and confused. When the revelations of the crimes committed by Stalin and his followers found their way to the party leadership in East Germany, they were accompanied by an internal document which included a guide on how the revelations should be interpreted, together with an estimation of how the revelations would be impacting Soviet society. Towards the end of March 1956, Schirdewan again encountered Nikita Khrushchev, this time at the funeral of the Polish leader, Bolesław Bierut who had died suddenly - some said he was poisoned - a couple of weeks after returning to Warsaw following the 20th Party Congress in Moscow. Khrushchev took the opportunity to express his fury over the way his publicising of Stalin's crimes had been communicated to the party leadership by the Ulbricht government in Berlin.

During a visit to East Berlin in 1957, Khrushchev invited Schirdewan to give his opinion on the possibilities of a more collaborative relationship with Social Democratic parties. Recalling his working-class upbringing in Breslau, Schirdewan related how the left-wing elements in youth movements of the Social Democratic Party in 1920s Germany had worked well with their Communist comrades. The Soviet leader pressed for more details and then suggested Schirdewan should holiday with him at the Black Sea resort of Sochi so that the two of them might discuss the future further. Schirdewan had already taken his holiday entitlement for 1957 and explained that a second holiday would need to be cleared with his boss. Ulbricht, when asked, responded with the single word answer, "Ach!". It is still not clear for how long, nor how powerfully Schirdewan had been arguing the case for reform with his Politburo colleagues in Berlin, but it is apparent that by 1957, his relationship with Ulbricht was not good. There was no second holiday.

=== Downfall ===
Within the East German leadership, Schirdewan, according to his own later recollection, continued to urge colleagues to respond more actively to the de-Stalinization agenda coming out of Moscow throughout 1957, with the further possibility that this might open the way for German reunification on acceptable terms. However, a sign of the hardliners' views on de-Stalinization was a return to show trials. It is true that the sentences handed out to Wolfgang Harich, Walter Janka and their alleged fellow conspirators in 1957 were less savage than those received by Johann Burianek or Günter Stempel in 1952, and the propaganda accompanying the show trials in 1957 was less shrill than it had been earlier in the decade. Nevertheless, there was nothing in the government's domestic policy to suggest that the Communist regime was about to apply the radical reformist thinking advocated by Khrushchev the previous year. Meanwhile, Moscow was increasingly preoccupied with events in Hungary, where the fast moving aftermath of the Secret Speech had culminated in a government declaration of intent to withdraw from the Warsaw Pact at the end of October 1956, and a Soviet military intervention with tanks on the streets of Budapest in November. Khrushchev had apparently come into line with the hardline faction headed up by his Kremlin deputy Vyacheslav Molotov. With Khrushchev distracted and possibly losing influence in Moscow, in East Berlin, Walter Ulbricht, backed by senior colleagues who included Erich Mielke and Erich Honecker, felt strong enough to move against Karl Schirdewan. In October 1957, Schirdewan and his fellow reformer Ernst Wollweber resigned from key offices. The climax of the downfall came on 5 February 1958, when Schirdewan was expelled from the Party Central Committee. The expulsion, enacted at the 35th Plenum of the Central Committee, was attributed to "Factionalism" ("Fraktionstätigkeit") and was accompanied by a "stern rebuke" ("strenge Rüge"). The expulsion had come despite a plea from Khrushchev at a meeting in Moscow a couple of weeks earlier (to which, as minutes of the meeting indicate, Ulbricht had agreed) that Schirdewan should at least retain his Central Committee membership. Karl Schirdewan was placed in charge of the National Archives at Potsdam, which, from the perspective of the national leadership team, was seen as a "punishment job".

=== Long retirement and rehabilitation ===
Little was heard of Karl Schirdewan for the next thirty years. He retired from the national archives in 1964 or 1965. Sources differ as to which. In the end he outlived Walter Ulbricht, Erich Honecker and even the German Democratic Republic itself.

During the events that culminated in German reunification (October 1990) East Germany's ruling Socialist Unity Party (SED) reinvented itself in preparation for East Germany's first (and last) democratic general election, emerging, at that time to an uncertain future, rebranded as the Party of Democratic Socialism (PDS). In 1990 the PDS formally rehabilitated Schirdewan, more than three decades after its predecessor had expelled him, and recruited him into its "Council of elders" ("Ältestenrat"): his widow is still (2015) one of its (approximately 20) members.

Schirdewan also lived long enough to contribute to the historiography of East Germany, giving at least one substantial interview. In 1994 he published a book that focused on his personal nemesis, Walter Ulbricht. A second autobiographical volume, "Ein Jahrhundert Leben: Erinnerungen und Visionen : Autobiographie", was published in 1998 which was the year in which he died.

== Personal life ==
Schirdewan had already been married for some time to his wife, Gisela, at the time in February 1956 when she collected him from the airport on his return from hearing Khrushchev delivering his Moscow speech, "On the Cult of Personality and Its Consequences". At that stage there are hints that the couple were deferring having children because of the political uncertainties surrounding them. Many years later, addressing mourners at his funeral in 1998, the pioneering PDS leader Michael Schumann addressed Schirdevan's wife Gisela, his four children, his grand children and other relatives. The number of his grandchildren was not given, and sources focused on his political career are silent on his private life, which is usual with East German politicians.
