= Georg Stibi =

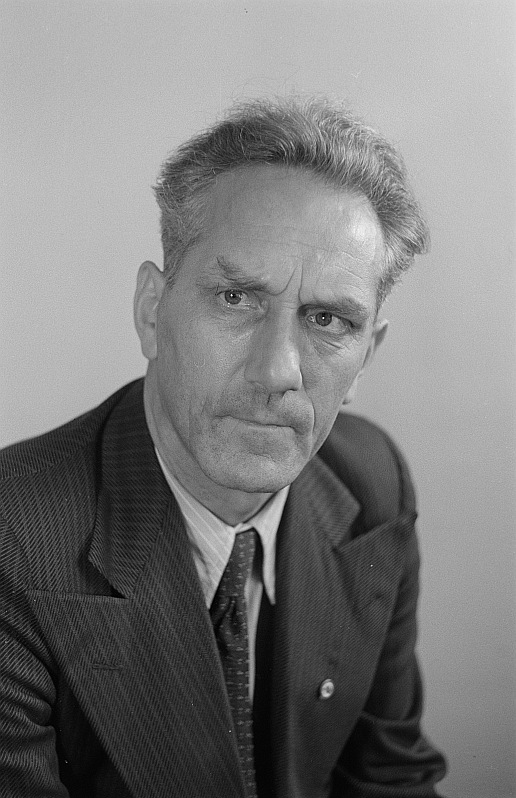
- Georg Stibi (1953)

Ambassador of the German Democratic Republic to Czechoslovakia
- In office 1958–1961
- Preceded by: Bernard Koenen
- Succeeded by: Walter Vesper

Ambassador of the German Democratic Republic to Romania
- In office 1957–1958
- Preceded by: Werner Eggerath
- Succeeded by: Wilhelm Bick

Personal details
- Born: 25 July 1901 Markt Rettenbach, German Empire
- Died: 30 May 1982 (aged 80) Berlin, German Democratic Republic
- Resting place: Zentralfriedhof Friedrichsfelde
- Party: Socialist Unity Party of Germany (1946–); Communist Party of Germany (1922–1945); Independent Social Democratic Party of Germany (1919–1922)
- Awards: Star of Peoples' Friendship, in gold (1981); Patriotic Order of Merit, honour clasp (1976); Hero of Labour (1971); Order of Karl Marx (1966); Patriotic Order of Merit, in gold (1961); Patriotic Order of Merit, in silver (1955)

Georg Stibi (25 July 1901 – 30 May 1982) was a German diplomat, journalist, and politician. From 1961 to 1974 he was deputy foreign minister of East Germany. From 1957 to 1958 he was the ambassador of the German Democratic Republic to Romania; and from 1958 to 1961 he was ambassador to Czechoslovakia.

== Life ==
Georg Stibi was born on 25 July 1901 in Markt Rettenbach, the son of a cobbler. After attending elementary school he worked as a farm labourer and industrial worker before becoming a journalist. In 1919, he joined the Independent Social Democratic Party of Germany. In 1922, he joined the Communist Party of Germany. Stibi then worked as a correspondent for the newspaper, Die Rote Fahne. In February 1930, he was arrested for publishing about Germany's secret and illegal rearmament, and sentenced to two years in prison for treason. He was released from prison in May 1932. From 1937 to 1939 he took part in the Spanish Civil War, where he presented German-language radio programs. In 1938, his German citizenship was revoked by the Nazi government. Following the collapse of the Second Spanish Republic at the conclusion of the war in 1939, Stibi travelled to France and was interned in Camp Vernet. He was later transferred to Camp des Milles, where he would escape from in 1941. Thereafter he emigrated to Mexico. In Mexico, he joined the Free Germany Movement (BFD) and the Heinrich Heine Club; a group of German exiles living in Mexico that included Anna Seghers, Egon Kisch, and Bodo Uhse, among others.

In 1946, Stibi returned to Berlin and joined the Socialist Unity Party of Germany. After serving as editor-in-chief of the Berliner Zeitung in 1949, he was editor-in-chief of the Leipziger Volkszeitung from 1953 to 1954 and the editor-in-chief of Neues Deutschland from 1955 to 1956. From 1957 to 1958 he was the ambassador of the German Democratic Republic to Romania; and from 1958 to 1961 he was ambassador to Czechoslovakia. Stibi was the Deputy Foreign Minister of East Germany from 1961 to 1974. He died on 30 May 1982 in Berlin.

== Awards ==
- 1981 Star of Peoples' Friendship, in gold
- 1976 Patriotic Order of Merit, honour clasp
- 1971 Hero of Labour
- 1966 Order of Karl Marx
- 1961 Patriotic Order of Merit, in gold
- 1955 Patriotic Order of Merit, in silver
