= Wilhelm Koenen =

German politician (1886–1963)

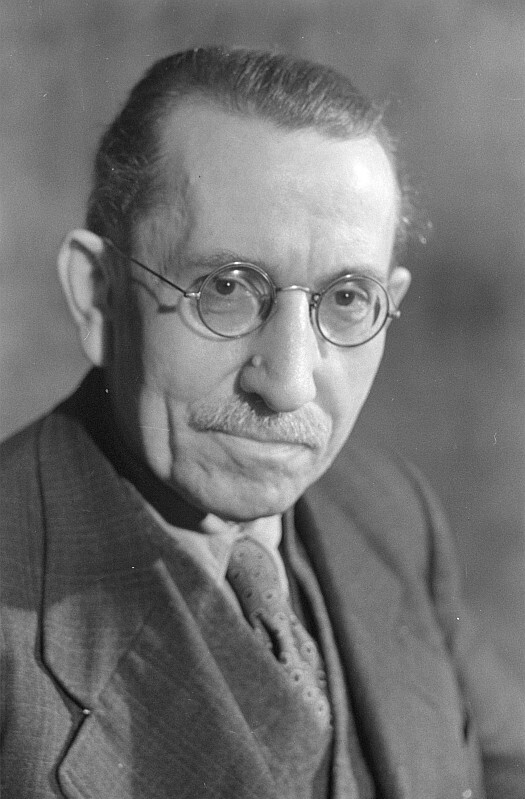
- Koenen in 1947

Chairman of the Socialist Unity Party in Saxony
- In office 21 April 1946 – 4 December 1948 Serving with Otto Buchwitz
- Deputy: Otto Schön; Erich Mückenberger
- Preceded by: Position established
- Succeeded by: Ernst Lohagen; Erich Mückenberger
Parliamentary constituencies
Member of the Volkskammer for Berlin
In office 18 March 1948 – 19 October 1963
Preceded by	Constituency established
Succeeded by	Multi-member district
Member of the Landtag of Prussia for Merseburg
In office 25 May 1932 – 31 March 1933
Preceded by	Multi-member district
Succeeded by	Constituency abolished
Member of the Reichstag for Merseburg
In office 24 June 1920 – 31 July 1932
Preceded by	Constituency established
Succeeded by	Multi-member district
Member of the National Assembly for Merseburg
In office 6 February 1919 – 21 May 1920
Preceded by	Office established
Succeeded by	Office abolished

Personal details
- Born: 7 April 1886 Hamburg, German Empire
- Died: 19 October 1963 (aged 77) East Berlin, East Germany
- Resting place: Zentralfriedhof Friedrichsfelde
- Party: SPD (1903–1917); USPD (1917–1920); KPD (1920–1946); SED (after 1946)
- Spouse: Emmy Damerius (m. 1937)
- Children: Heinrich; Johanna
- Relatives: Bernard Koenen (brother)
- Occupation: Journalist; Politician
- Awards: Order of Karl Marx

Military service
- Allegiance: German Empire
- Branch/service: Landsturm
- Battles/wars: World War I
- Central institution membership: 1946–1963: Full member, Central Committee (Note: Party Executive Committee until 1950); 1923–1926: Full member, KPD Politburo; 1923–1924; 1929–1946: Full member, KPD Central Committee (Note: Zentrale until 1925); Other offices held: 1946–1949: Member, Landtag of Saxony; 1929–1932: Member, Prussian State Council; 1929–1931: Political Leader, Halle-Merseburg KPD; 1926–1932: Member, Berlin City Council; 1919–1920: Member, Halle City Council; 1918–1919: Commissar, Halle-Merseburg Workers' and Soldiers' Council

Wilhelm Koenen (7 April 1886 – 19 October 1963) was a German communist journalist and politician who served in several legislative positions in the Weimar Republic and East Germany between 1919 and 1963. He also served as the first co-chairman of the Socialist Unity Party in Saxony from 1946 to 1948.

== Biography ==
=== Early life ===
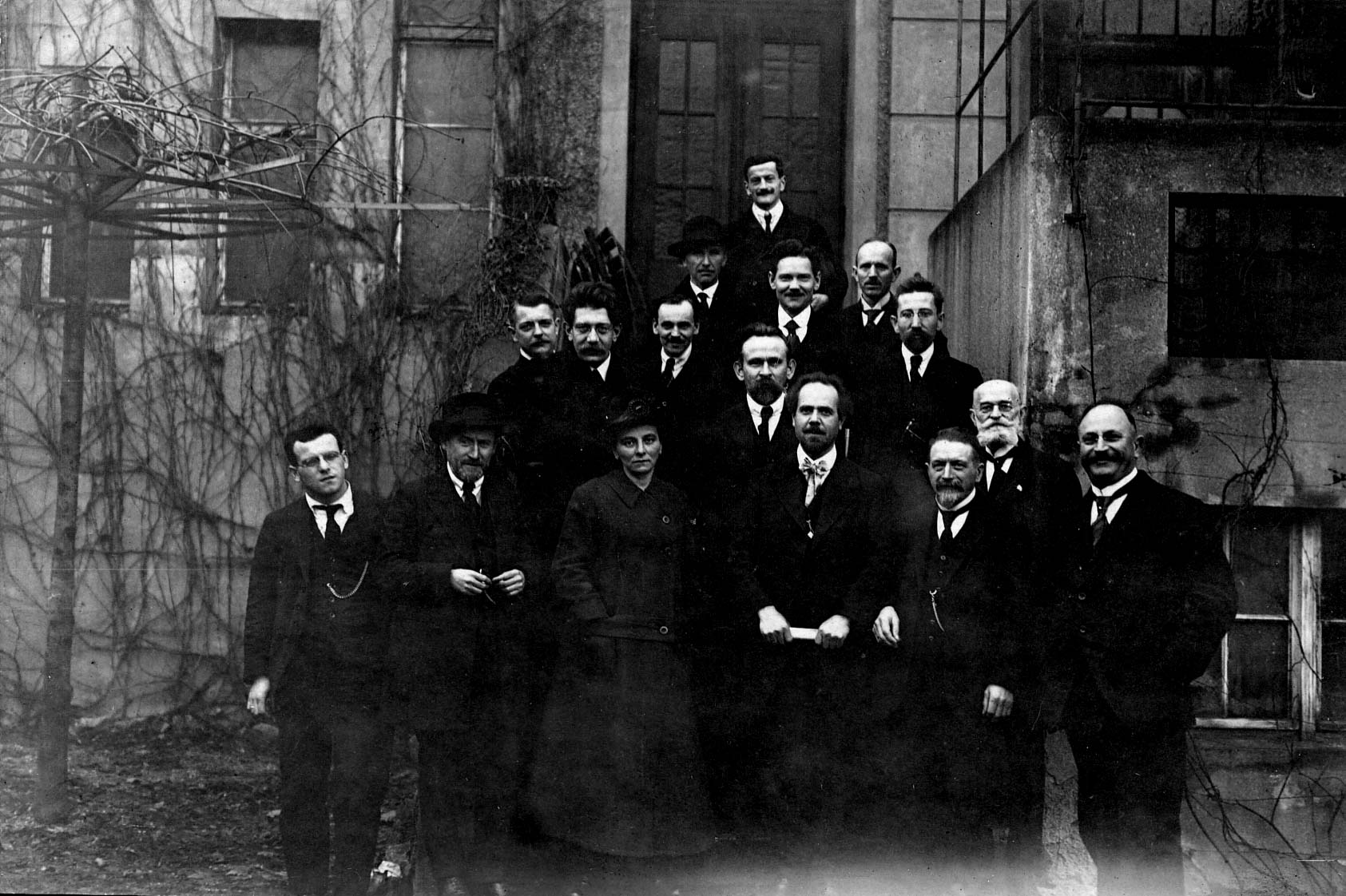
Koenen (second row, far right) among members of the USPD National Executive Committee at the party's Leipzig Congress, December 1919

Koenen was born in Hamburg, the son of a socialist carpenter and a cook. After finishing Volksschule, he continued his education, taking classes in business from 1900 to 1903. Koenen joined the Social Democratic Party of Germany (SPD) in 1903. In 1904, he found employment at a book shop in Kiel. In addition, he took courses at the workers' school in Hamburg and the Social Democrat Party school in Berlin. In 1907, he became a newspaper correspondent in Kiel and then in Königsberg. In 1911, he became editor of the social democrat newspaper, Volksblatt, in Halle.

In 1913, he became a member of the local district SPD leadership and with the majority of the local membership, joined the Independent Social Democratic Party (USPD) in 1917. According to at least one source, he served in the Landsturm ("Home Guard") during the First World War. During the German Revolution of 1918–1919, Koenen was the commissar of the Worker and Soldiers' Council of the Halle-Merseburg district. In the 1919 German federal election, he was elected to the Weimar National Assembly. On 16 July 1919, in the National Assembly, he called for the adoption of a constitutional provision that would exclusively grant to the authorities and charitable organizations the right to hold public film screenings for adolescents so that youth would be protected from the wheeling and dealing of "the capitalists".

=== Weimar era ===
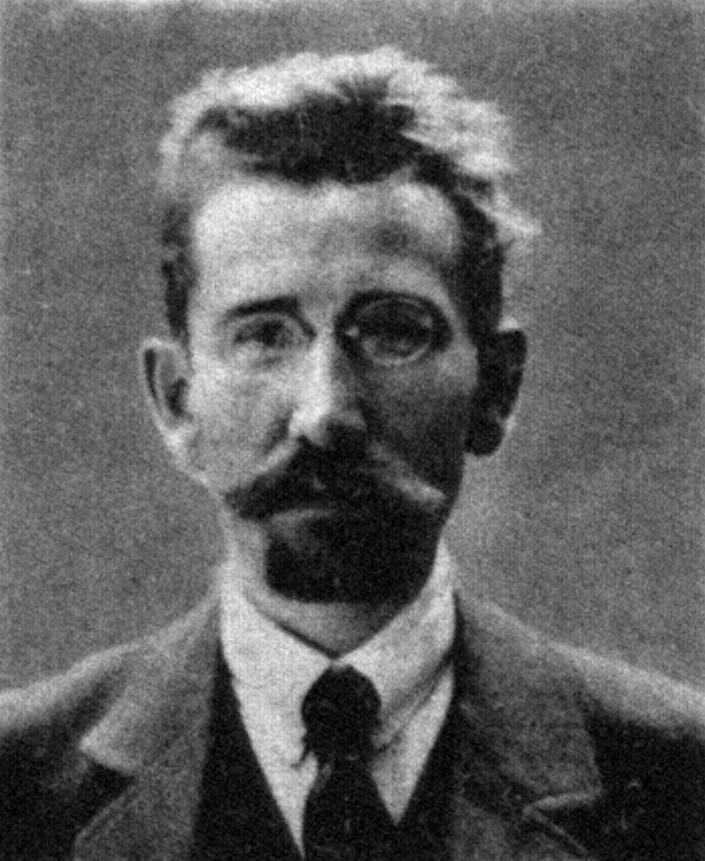
Koenen's official Reichstag portrait, 1920

In 1919, Koenen was a member of the USPD's central committee, but in 1920 he joined the Communist Party (Kommunistische Partei Deutschlands, or KPD), where he became part of the left wing. He served as a member of the Weimar Reichstag from 1920 to 1932, then in the Prussian Landtag from 1932 to 1933 (leading the party list in the Merseburg district), in addition to the Berlin city council from 1926 to 1932.

From 1924, he was a member of the "Middle Group" (Mittelgruppe) and in 1925, actively supported the leadership group headed by Ernst Thälmann. Koenen served as political leader of the KPD for the Halle-Merseburg district from 1929 to 1931, replacing Conciliator Johannes Schröter, but internal politics later forced him into the background and he lost his party function in Halle and what had been his secure place on the party list. Koenen was one of some 40 people at the meeting of the KPD central committee on 7 February 1933, at the Sporthaus Ziegenhals, just a week after the Nazi Party seized power and was the last time that Thälmann, chairman of the KPD, spoke to the central committee.

=== In exile ===
Koenen left Germany in June 1933 on the decision of the party leadership, first going to the Saarland, then still under foreign occupation. He then went to France, where he was involved in the "Lutetia circle", trying to build a popular front against the Hitler régime. From 1935 to 1938, he lived in Czechoslovakia, where he was married to Emmy Damerius. They moved to England, where they were both taken into custody as an "enemy aliens" in 1940. She was sent to the Isle of Man until 1941; he was shipped to an internment camp in Canada until 1942. In 1943, he was a founding member of the "Free Germany" movement in London. In 1944, he worked at the British black propaganda radio station, Soldatensender Calais.

=== East Germany ===
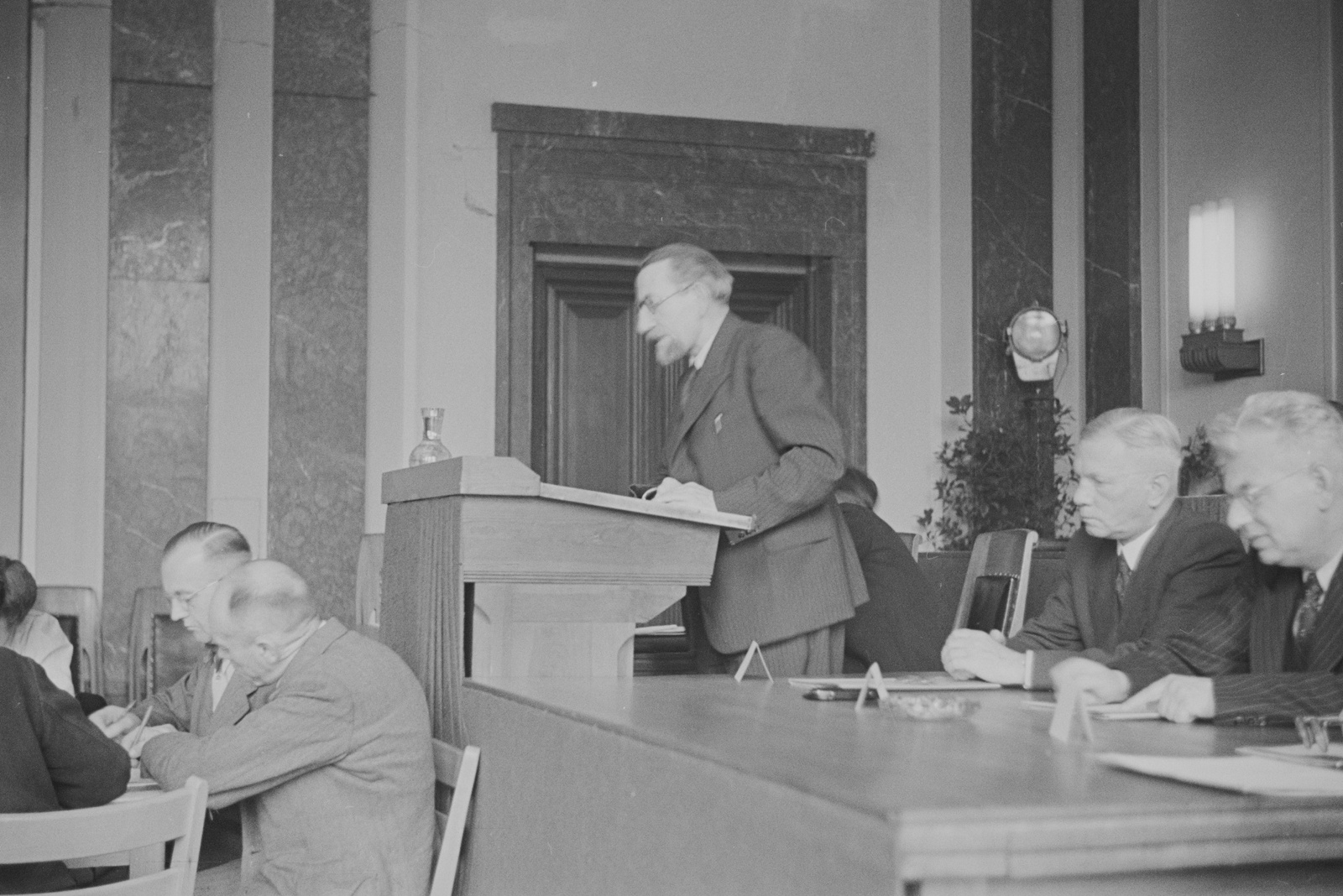
Koenen speaks before the Landtag of Saxony, 1946

In 1945, he returned to Germany and took part in rebuilding the KPD. After the forced merger of the SPD and the KPD into the Socialist Unity Party of Germany (Sozialistische Einheitspartei Deutschlands, or SED), he took part in building the SED in East Germany. Until 1946, he also worked as the chief editor of the KPD newspaper, Freiheit in Halle, forerunner of the Mitteldeutsche Zeitung. In 1946, he became part of the board of the SED, as well as its central committee. Between 1946 and 1949, Koenen was a representative in the Saxon Landtag. From 1949 until his death, he was a member of the Volkskammer and was leader of the Secretariat. In May 1953, he was accused of "a lack of vigilance" and was reprimanded by the SED leadership. In 1955, he became the chairman of the Interparlamentarischen Gruppe (Interparliamentarian Group) German Democratic Republic. In 1956, Wilhelm Koenen was decorated with the Karl Marx Order.

== Personal life ==
Koenen married Emmy Damerius in 1937, and had two children from a prior marriage. His son Heinrich was arrested by the Gestapo at the home of Ilse Stöbe on 29 October 1942, and in February 1945 was shot at Sachsenhausen concentration camp.

Koenen's brother Bernard Koenen was arrested briefly during the Great Purge. He and his brother are both buried at the Socialists' Memorial at the Berlin cemetery, Zentralfriedhof Friedrichsfelde. A street in Sangerhausen is named after Wilhelm Koenen.

== Sources ==
- Horst Neumann: Wilhelm Koenen, Bibliographisches Institut: Leipzig 1971
- Asja Braune: Konsequent den unbequemen Weg gegangen. Adele Schreiber (1872–1957) Politikerin, Frauenrechtlerin, Journalistin 2002 in 2 Bänden = Diss. HU Berlin 2003.- Kap. 7 online: Das Exil mit Ausführungen zur Freien Deutschen Bewegung (FDB) und über die Freie Deutsche Hochschule in Großbritannien
