= Heinrich Koenen =

German resistance member (1910–1945)

Heinrich Koenen

Heinrich Koenen (12 May 1910 – February 1945) was a German engineer, anti-fascist resistance fighter and agent of the Soviet military intelligence service GRU, known as a "scout".

== Life ==
Heinrich Koenen was born in the Konigsberg district of Berlin, the son of Communist Reichstag deputy Wilhelm Koenen. He was selected as political head of the Young Communist League of Germany. He studied engineering at the Technische Hochschule in Charlottenburg (now Technische Universität Berlin), but for political reasons was expelled in 1933 before his final examination. He emigrated via Denmark and Sweden to the Soviet Union, where he worked as an engineer in a Moscow tractor factory and in 1940, became a Soviet citizen.

After Germany attacked the Soviet Union in 1941, he volunteered for military service and was trained for use in Germany as a paratrooper and radio operator. He was given the task of restoring the broken links between the Moscow headquarters of the Comintern and the GRU and the Berlin group of the Red Orchestra. On 23 October 1942, Koenen parachuted behind German lines at Osterode in East Prussia and made his way to Berlin to his contact, Ilse Stöbe. On 29 October 1942, he was arrested by a Gestapo official waiting at Stöbe's apartment.

Koenen was executed without trial at Sachsenhausen concentration camp in February 1945. His name is inscribed on a memorial in the Gedenkstätte der Sozialisten Socialist Memorial in Lichtenberg, Berlin.

== Bibliography ==
- Luise Kraushaar et al.: Deutsche Widerstandskämpfer 1933–1945: Biografien und Briefe, Volume 1, Dietz-Verlag, Berlin 1970, p.513 ff
- Hans-Joachim Fieber et al.: Widerstand in Berlin gegen das NS-Regime 1933 bis 1945: ein biographisches Lexikon, Volume 4 Trafo-Verlag, Berlin 2002, ISBN 3-89626-354-4, p.115
- Helmut Roewer, Stefan Schäfer, Matthias Uhl: Lexikon der Geheimdienste im 20 Jahrhundert. Herbig, Munich 2003, ISBN 3-7766-2317-9, p.242 ff
- Ulrich Sahm: Ilse Stöbe Die Rote Kapelle im Widerstand gegen den Nationalsozialismus. Schriften der Gedenkstätte Deutscher Widerstand, Berlin Hans Coppi, Jürgen Danyel, John Tuchel (eds), Berlin 1994, ISBN 3-89468-110-1, pp.262–276
- Leopold Trepper: Die Wahrheit: Autobiographie des 'grand Chef' der roten Kapelle, Ahriman-Verlag Freiburg 1995, ISBN 3-89484-554-6
- Heinrich-Wilhelm Wörmann: Widerstand in Charlottenburg; Band 5 der Schriftenreihe der Gedenkstätte Deutscher Widerstand, Berlin 1991 (2nd verb. and expanded edition Berlin 1998) p.133
