= Ferdinand Jung =

German communist activist

- Born: 24 January 1905; Waltershausen, Thuringia, Germany
- Died: 2 December 1973 (aged 68)
- Occupation: Politician
- Political party: KPD; SED

Ferdinand Jung (24 January 1905 – 2 December 1973) was a German Communist activist who resisted the Nazi government in the 1930s and spent a good deal of time in prisons and concentration camps. In later life he found himself in the political mainstream in his country's second one-party dictatorship and became a senior politician.

== Life ==
=== Early years ===
Jung was born early in 1905 into a working-class family in Waltershausen, a small manufacturing town in south-central Germany which since 1815 had built up a reputation as a centre for doll and toy making. He attended school locally till 1919 and then found work in Walternshausen in one of the town's doll factories. He took work in a factory producing rubber articles, which was another niche industry that had settled in the town. A period of unemployment followed from 1922 till 1924, after which he worked in the rubber industry, in the potash industry with Wintershall AG in nearby Merkers and on the railways, based in Walternshausen. There was a further period of unemployment between 1929 and 1933.

=== Politics ===
Early during the 1920s Jung joined the recently created Young Communists (KJVD / Kommunistischer Jugendverband Deutschlands), and in 1924, the year of his nineteenth birthday, he also joined the Communist party, becoming an active member of the Red Front Fighters (RFB /Roter Frontkämpferbund). Between 1924 and 1929 he was a political leader within the Young Communists: within the Communist Party, between 1931 and 1933 he was party head for the Waltershausen sub-district and a political leader in the party's Anti-Fascist Fighters' League.

=== Nazi years ===
Germany underwent significant regime change in January 1933 when the NDSDAP (Nazi Party) took power, and lost little time in imposing the country's first twentieth century one-party dictatorship. A feature of the new government's leadership was a powerful capacity for hatred: Chancellor Hitler had for many years been particularly vitriolic on the subject of Communists. After Jung's house had been searched in February 1933 Jung himself went into hiding and lived illegally successively in Friedrichroda, Tambach-Dietharz and Gotha. During this time he was working closely with Erich Hohnstein. The two of them both undertook courier work for The (now illegal) Party, and were involved in the illegal production of the Thüringer Volksblatt" (newspaper).

In July 1933 he moved to Erfurt, where the (illegal) regional party leadership had appointed him as an itinerant instructor. His work in this capacity concentrated initially on Suhl, Zella-Mehlis, Schmalkalden and Meiningen. Later his party work also took in Eisenach, Mühlhausen and the Erfurt conglomeration. On 10 February 1934 the Gestapo arrested him. Half a year later, in June 1934, he was convicted of high treason in Jena, and given a three-year prison term.

He served his sentence in the prison at Untermaßfeld after which, in March 1937, instead of being released he was merely transferred to the Bad Sulza Concentration Camp. He was then moved to Lichtenburg and then, from July till August 1937 Buchenwald. He was finally released from the concentration camp system in April 1939 and then, till April 1945, worked in Gotha in the guilding and roofing trades. He also worked at different times as a steel cable maker and as a driver.

War had resumed in September 1939 following a Nazi-Soviet Non-aggression pact that opened the way for a repeat partition of Poland between the two dictatorships. It ended in May 1945 with the central part of what had been Germany, including Thuringia, under Soviet Military Administration. In 1945 Jung became a member of the Communist Party regional leadership team in Erfurt. Between June and September 1946 he was employed as the manager at the Employment Office in Waltershausen: then from October 1945 till January 1946 he served as deputy administrator (Landrat) in Gotha. Between February 1946 and October 1948 he served in Weimar-Erfurt as First Secretary of the People's Solidarity organisation, a non-parliamentary Mass movement after the Leninist model, focused in this instance on funding and administering care for the elderly.

=== Soviet administration ===
The end of the war had appeared to signal an end to one-party dictatorship, but within the Soviet occupation zone in April 1946 the contentious merger of the KPD and more moderately left-wing SPD prepared the ground for a return to one-party rule. Ferdinand Jung was one of many Communists who lost little time in signing their membership across to the resulting Socialist Unity Party (SED / Sozialistische Einheitspartei Deutschlands). From 1946 he was a member of the party's regional leadership for Weimar-Erfurt.

=== The German Democratic Republic ===
From November 1948 till January 1952 Jung was in charge of the SED (party)'s Business Department in the state of Thuringia. Meanwhile, formally in October 1949, the Soviet occupation zone became the Soviet sponsored German Democratic Republic, many of its constitutional arrangements directly modeled on those of the Soviet Union itself. An important feature of the country's power structure was the "leading role" of the party which meant that both at the national and regional levels, administrators and ministers (who were generally already party members) were expected to carry out party policy. Decisions came from the party, party power being ever more firmly centralised in Berlin. Ferdinand Jung retained his party post in Thuringia until 1952 when the regional tier of government was abolished, powers being transferred up the line to the centre or down to local bodies. Between 1952 and January 1953 Jung served as First Secretary of the Party Leadership in Meiningen, a midsize town in the administrative district of Suhl. Then, in January 1953 he embarked on a year of study at The Party's "Karl Marx" Academy.

Ferdinand Jung
Awards and honours
- 1959: Patriotic Order of Merit in bronze
- 1965: Patriotic Order of Merit in silver
- Medal for Fighters Against Fascism

In 1954/55 he was empowered as a trainer in the Central Governance department of the party's powerful Central Committee. Returning to regional government, from September 1955 he served as Second Secretary in the party district leadership of Suhl. Between 1958 and 1967 he was also listed as a district councillor in Suhl. However, in September 1963 he was badly injured in a motor accident, as a result of which, in May 1964, he resigned his party post.

Between 1964 and 1969 Ferdinand Jung headed up the "Commission for Research of the local Workers' Movement" for the party leadership in Suhl, and he was also Chairman of the "Commission for the Care of Deserving Elderly Party Members".
