= State of Saxony (1945–1952) =

Soviet subdivision of Germany

State of Saxony Land Sachsen (German) Stat Sakska (Upper Sorbian)
- Subdivision of the Soviet occupation zone State of East Germany
- 1945–1952
- Flag

- Capital: Dresden
- Area
  - 1950: 17,004 km^{2} (6,565 sq mi)
- Population
  - 1950: 5,682,800
- Government
  - Type: Communist state under military occupation
- First Secretary of the Socialist Unity Party
  - 1946–1948: Wilhelm Koenen and Otto Buchwitz
  - 1948–1949: Erich Mückenberger and Ernst Lohagen
  - 1949–1952: Ernst Lohagen
  - 1952: Karl Schirdewan
- Minister-President
  - 1945–1947†: Rudolf Friedrichs
  - 1947–1952: Max Seydewitz
- Legislature: Landtag of Saxony
- Historical era: Post-World War II; Cold War
  - Established: July 1945
  - Declaration as state: 16 January 1947
  - State of East Germany: 7 October 1949
  - Disestablished: 25 July 1952
Preceded by
Gau Saxony
Succeeded by
Bezirk Dresden
Bezirk Leipzig
Bezirk Karl-Marx-Stadt
Bezirk Cottbus
- Today part of: Germany

The State of Saxony (German: Land Sachsen) was a subdivision of the Soviet occupation zone in Germany (until 1949) and state of East Germany (from 1952) which broadly corresponds with the present-day German state of Saxony.

== History ==
In 1945, the state of Saxony was re-formed within the Soviet occupation zone, consisting of the former Free State of Saxony and the areas of the Prussian province of Lower Silesia west of the Oder-Neisse border (Upper Lusatia), with a total area of 17,004 km. The Saxon areas east of the Oder-Neisse line were lost to Polish People's Republic.

At the beginning of May 1945 the Ulbricht group made up of members of the NKFD and KPD, was responsible for Saxony began its political work in Dresden under Anton Ackermann, organizations such as Domowina were reestablished. The state associations of the SPD and the KPD carried out forced unification to form the SED before the zone-wide merger on April 22, 1946. The first advisory meeting of the provisional state assembly took place in May 1946. The focus of the consultation was the preparation of law on the expropriation of companies without compensation and the creation of state owned companies.

The first election of the Saxon state parliament took place on October 20, 1946, where in Saxony the SED won 49.11% of the vote and 59 seats, the LDPD won 24.71% of the vote and 30 seats, the CDU won 23.30% of the vote and 28 seats, and the VdgB won 1.74% of the vote and 2 seats. Other political party's won 1.14% of the vote and 1 seat. During the election Rudolf Friedrichs was elected as the first minister-president of the state of Saxony in the German Democratic Republic, and on February 28, 1947, the state constitution would be passed.

=== Land Reform ===
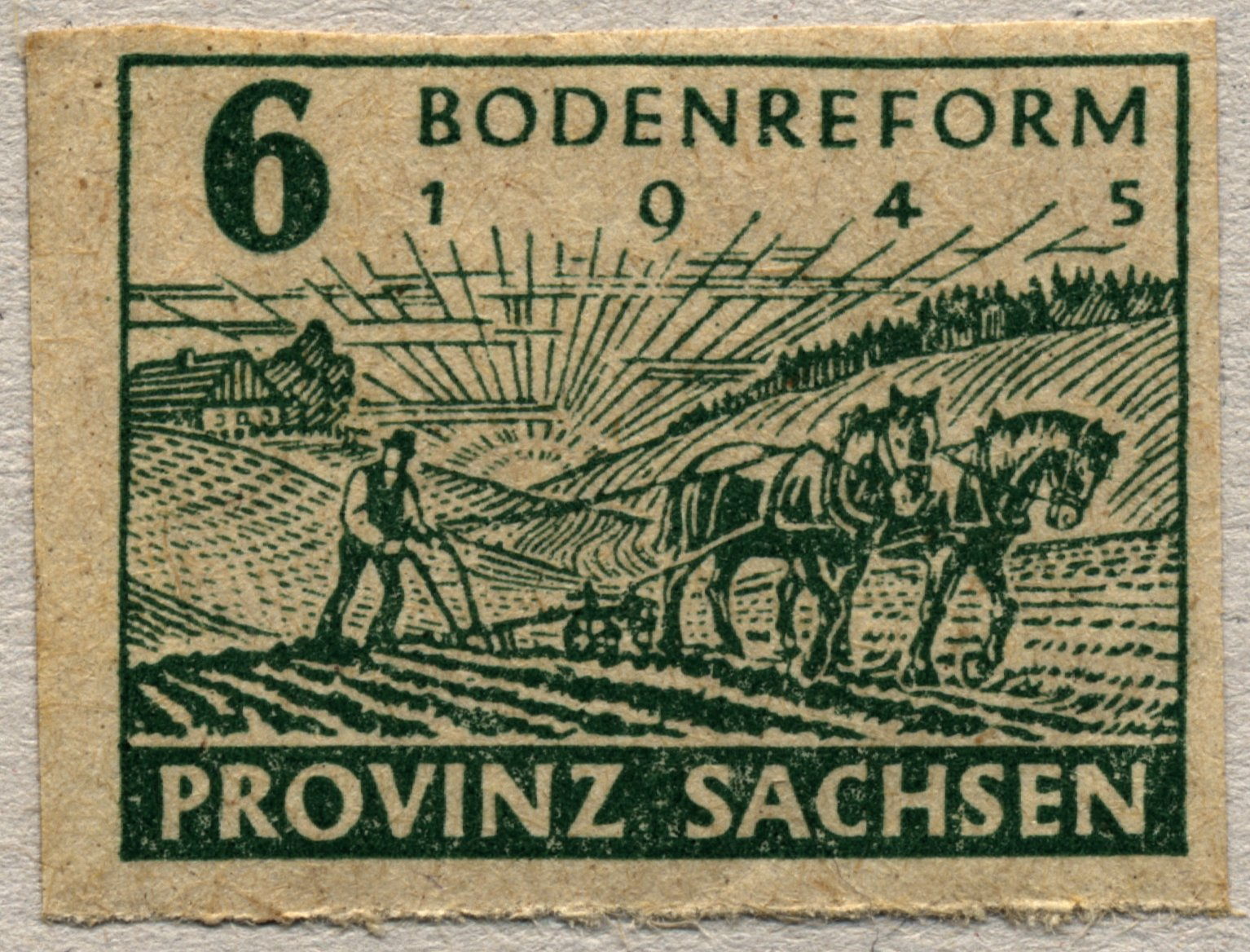
Stamp advertising land reform in Saxony, December 1945

During land reform in November 1947, around an eighth of Saxony's agricultural land (1,212 estates with 260,000 hectares of land) was expropriated and given to new farmers. According to the Potsdam Agreement, large German companies and the property of the most active Nazis were transferred to the control of the Allies of the second world war. In May 1946, the Soviet Military Administration in Germany transferred those goods to the state administration of the Soviet occupation zone.

The important cultural assets of the numerous Saxon castles and mansions also came into state administration. These include around 1,000 estate archives and important castle libraries. (e.g. those of Kuckuckstein Castle and Gussing Castle), which were assigned to state archives, as well as around 11,400 additional works of art formed the basis of the 130 museums founded in the post-war years.

=== Dissolution into Districts ===
On July 23, 1952, a law passed which reorganized the state of Saxony into the three Districts of Dresden, Leipzig and Chemnitz (Karl-Marx-Stadt 1953 to 1990). A small part of Upper Lusatia was added to the District of Cottbus.

== Minister-President (1945-1952) ==
Political parties: SPD SED

== See also ==
- Saxony in the German Revolution (1918–1919)
- Saxon People's Party
- Chamber of States
- Denazification
