= Otto Franke (politician) =

German politician

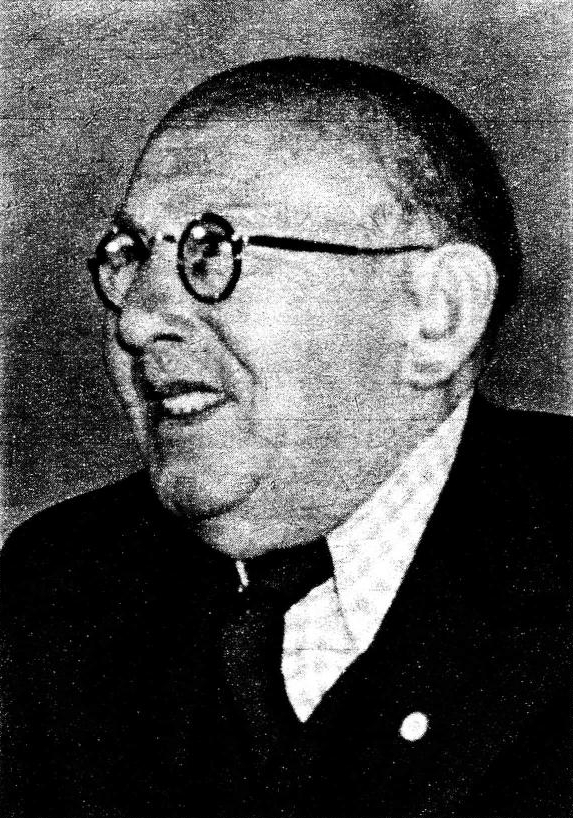
- Franke c. 1953
- Born: September 15, 1877; Rixdorf (Berlin), German Empire
- Died: 12 December 1953 (aged 76); East Berlin, East Germany
- Occupation: Politician
- Political party: SPD; KPD; CPSU; SED

Otto Franke (15 September 1877 – 12 December 1953) was a German trades union pioneer, politician and peace activist.

== Life ==
Otto Franke was born in Rixdorf, as it was known before 1912, then a town just outside Berlin on it north eastern side. He attended elementary school between 1891 and 1894, and then embarked on a traineeship as a Machine Maker. At the same time he attended evening and weekend courses covering a range of subjects. Meanwhile, in 1892 he joined the Social Democratic Party (SPD / Sozialdemokratische Partei Deutschlands) and the newly formed German Metal Workers' Union. He was one of the founder members of the "German Transport Workers' League" in 1898, becoming a regional leader for Berlin in 1901 and, from 1903, General Secretary for Greater Berlin of the "German Trade, Transport and Traffic Workers' League", of which by 1907 he had become a full-time official. In 1907 he became a full-time official of the German Transport Workers' Union. There is a record of his having been a foundry worker with AEG and as a labourer in a linen factory, but he repeatedly lost his jobs because of his union activity.

War broke out in August 1914, rapidly triggering a truce between the mainstream left-wing Social Democratic Party (SPD), and the political establishment. In the early months of the fighting Socialist politicians and trades unions were actively supportive of the war effort or else silent. The high-profile exception was Karl Liebknecht. Otto Franke, too, unhesitatingly opposed the war, and inevitably this brought him into contact with the pacifist Spartacus group developing from what had been the left wing of the SPD. Franke's opposition to the war was only intensified in 1915, when his brother was killed in the fighting. More generally, opposition to the war grew in Germany as the prospect of a rapid end to it receded. Otto Franke and Karl Liebknecht together organised a massive antiwar "May demonstration" in Berlin's Potsdamer Platz on 1 May 1916, for which together they had prepared the leaflets. Following this, in June 1916, Franke was arrested and held in investigative detention for five months, which he spent in the military prison at Moabit (Berlin). He was then sent to participate in the fighting on the Eastern Front. In Autumn 1917 he deserted and made his way back to Berlin where, as a deserter, he lived illegally, resuming his membership of the Spartacus League.

In January 1918 Franke organised a strike by Berlin munitions workers, while building up a transport and courier network for the anti-war Spartacus League. After war ended, and during the confused revolutionary period that directly followed German military defeat, Otto Franke worked more closely than anyone else with Karl Liebknecht until the latter's assassination. Franke was also prominent at this time as a member of the Berlin Soldiers' and Workers' Councils. During the closing days of December 1918 he participated at the foundation of the German Communist Party, when he was appointed First Secretary of the Party's first Berlin District leadership team. Franke was instrumental in building the Berlin party's organisation.

In 1921 he was sent south to Saxony where he took over the leadership of the Communist Party's East Saxony region. Two years later, in August 1923, he moved to Moscow where he took over the Information Department for Germany at the Comintern. Less than a year later, in May 1924, he returned to Berlin: here he was arrested shortly after his arrival. However, in October 1925 he was able to escape back to the Soviet Union. From 1928 he became a member of the Soviet Communist party. A so-called Hindenburg Amnesties enabled him to return to Germany later in 1928, and here, till 1933, he took charge of the Main Library and Archive of the Party Central Committee.

The political backdrop changed in January 1933 when the NSDAP (Nazi Party) took power and lost little time in moving to a system of one-party government in Germany. All political parties (other than the Nazi Party) were now illegal, but the new Chancellor had, in opposition, been particularly vitriolic about the Communist Party. Otto Franke was one of the organisers of the Communist Party's "illegal" Sporthaus Ziegenhals meeting in February 1933, following which he continued to work, now illegally, for the Communist Party in the Beeskow district.

In July 1933 Franke was arrested, and the next few years were spent in concentration camps at Oranienburg, Sonnenburg and Lichtenburg. Released from the third of these in October 1936, he found work in Autobahn construction. In November 1937 he was arrested again. After his release in January 1938 he emigrated to Prague where he worked as a military trainer for the party. After German troops invaded Czechoslovakia in March 1939 he had to emigrate again, and moved to London. Here he was one of many German political exiles to be identified by the British as an enemy alien, and in June 1940 he was interned. In March 1941 he was released, however, on account of illness.

War ended in May 1945 and on 14 September 1946 Otto Franke returned to Berlin. His part of Berlin was now part of the Soviet occupation zone in what had been Germany. The entire Soviet administered area would become the Soviet sponsored German Democratic Republic, formally in October 1949, but already in April 1946 the ground was prepared for a return to one-party government, with the contentious merger of the KPD and more moderately left-wing SPD Franke became a member of the resulting Socialist Unity Party (SED / Sozialistische Einheitspartei Deutschlands) and took a job at the "Karl Marx" Party Academy in Liebenwalde.

== Recognition ==
As a veteran of the workers' movement, Otto Franke became, in 1953, one of the first recipients of his new country's Order of Karl Marx award. Shortly after this he died. His ashes were placed in the zone reserved for the remains of East Germany's national heroes in the Friedrichsfelde Cemetery.
