= Bezirk Karl-Marx-Stadt =

District of East Germany (1952–1990)

District of Karl-Marx-Stadt Bezirk Karl-Marx-Stadt
- District (Bezirk) of East Germany
- 1952–1990
- Flag Coat of arms

- Location of Bezirk Karl-Marx-Stadt within the German Democratic Republic
- Capital: Karl-Marx-Stadt
- Area
  - 1989: 6,009 km^{2} (2,320 sq mi)
- Population
  - 1989: 1,859,500
- Government
- SED First Secretary
  - 1952–1959: Walter Buchheim
  - 1960–1963: Rolf Weihs
  - 1963–1976: Paul Roscher
  - 1976–1989: Siegfried Lorenz
  - 1989–1990: Norbert Kertscher
- Chairman of the Council of the Bezirk
  - 1952–1960: Max Müller
  - 1960–1963: Werner Felfe
  - 1963–1981: Heinz Arnold
  - 1981–1990: Lothar Fichtner
  - 1990: Albrecht Buttolo (as Regierungsbevollmächtigter)
- History
  - Established: 1952
  - Disestablished: 1990
Preceded by	Succeeded by
Saxony (1945–1952)	Saxony
- Today part of: Germany

The Bezirk Karl-Marx-Stadt, also known as Bezirk Chemnitz, was a district (Bezirk) of East Germany. The district existed from 1952 until the Reunification of Germany in 1990. The administrative seat and the main town was Karl-Marx-Stadt, renamed back to Chemnitz during the reunification of Germany.

== History ==
The Chemnitz District (renamed, with the city, after Karl Marx on 10 May 1953) was established, with the other 13, on 25 July 1952, substituting the old German states. After 3 October 1990, it was disestablished due to the German reunification, its territory becoming again part of the state of Saxony.

== Geography ==
=== Position ===
The Bezirk Karl-Marx-Stadt, corresponded to the area of the actual Direktionsbezirk Chemnitz and the southernmost one of DDR, bordered with the Bezirke of Gera, Leipzig and Dresden. It bordered also with Czechoslovakia and West German Upper Franconia.

=== Subdivision ===
The Bezirk was divided into 26 Kreise: 5 urban districts (Stadtkreise) and 21 rural districts (Landkreise):

- Urban districts : Johanngeorgenstadt; Karl-Marx-Stadt; Plauen; Schneeberg; Zwickau.
- Rural districts : Annaberg; Aue; Auerbach; Brand-Erbisdorf; Flöha; Freiberg; Glauchau; Hainichen; Hohenstein-Ernstthal; Karl-Marx-Stadt-Land; Klingenthal; Marienberg; Oelsnitz; Plauen-Land; Reichenbach; Rochlitz; Schwarzenberg; Stollberg; Werdau; Zschopau; Zwickau-Land.

== See also ==
- Direktionsbezirk Chemnitz
- Administrative divisions of East Germany
- Bezirk Dresden
- Bezirk Leipzig
