= Arthur Lieberasch =

- Born: 2 November 1881; Döbeln, Saxony, Germany
- Died: 10 June 1967 (aged 85); Leipzig, German Democratic Republic (East Germany)
- Occupations: Politician; Anti-Nazi activist Party official
- Political party: SPD; USPD; KPD; KPO; SED
- Spouse: yes

Arthur Lieberasch (2 November 1881 – 10 June 1967) was a Communist trades union official who became a member of the Parliament of Saxony ("Sächsischer Landtag") and, after 1933 an anti-government resistance activist.

== Life ==
=== Provenance and early years ===
Arthur Lieberasch was born in Döbeln, the third of his parents' ten children. His father, a tool-maker by trade, worked in the town's cigar factory. He attended school locally, and trained as a machinist. In 1900 or 1901 he joined the Metal Workers' Union. He joined the (recently rebranded and relaunched) Social Democratic Party (SPD) in 1905. As a union shop steward and member of workers' councils he was frequently reprimanded. His union activism nevertheless meant that his reputation grew across the whole of Saxony.

=== Trades union activist ===
The decision of the SPD leadership to back parliamentary votes to fund the war was controversial among party members from the outset, and as slaughter on the front-line and destitution on the home front intensified, tensions within the party increased. That led to a split. Arthur Lieberasch was among the anti-war left-wingers who broke away to form the so-called Independent Social Democratic Party ("Unabhängige Sozialdemokratische Partei Deutschlands" / USPD) in 1917, being a founder member of the new party in Saxony. During 1917 Lieberasch was among the leaders of the strikes that broke out in Leipzig - initially mostly in the munitions factories - in response to the food shortages which had intensified during the so-called "turnip winter" of 1917 and in the aftermath an announcement by the authorities (accompanied by government statements trumpeting the success of submarine warfare), on 15 April 1917, of a cut in the weekly bread ration from 1,350g to 450g. Strikes broke out in various cities in response to the food crisis: Leipzig was exceptional for the extent to which conservative elements in the Social Democratic mainstream collaborated with the authorities to frustrate the strikers, reflecting the particularly stark divisions in the city between moderates and radicals on the political left. Lieberasch's role as a strike leader led to his being charged with High Treason. However, the revolutionary outbursts in the German ports and cities directly after the war left the authorities with more urgent priorities, and his case never went to trial.

=== Revolutionary and Communist ===
The revolutionary period lasted approximately nine months. Arthur Lieberasch took a leading position on the Workers' and Soldiers' Councils in Leipzig. Both the revolutionaries and the volunteer militias (Freikorps) of former soldiers who resisted them saw the Russian Revolution as a possible template for a post-imperial Germany. The Communist Party of Germany had been established in Berlin at a three-day congress held between 30 December 1918 and 1 January 1919. The USPD itself broke apart at a party convention held at Halle on 12 October 1920. The left-wing majority among those present - which included Lieberasch - voted to join the Moscow sponsored Communist International ("Comintern"), and a few weeks later, on 4 December 1920, the left-wing USPD members formally switched their memberships to the Communist Party, which is frequently identified in sources from the early 1920s as the United Communist Party ("Vereinigte Kommunistische Partei Deutschland" / VKPD). Like many in his position, he now undertook a succession of official functions within the party. It was also as a communist that in 1921 Arthur Lieberasch was elected to membership of the Leipzig city council ("Stadtrat"), becoming the leader of the communist group on the council in 1927.

=== Regional parliamentarian ===
Regional elections were held in November 1922. Arthur Lieberasch was elected to the Parliament of Saxony ("Sächsischer Landtag") as a Communist Party member. The Communists polled well enough to deny the SPD an overall majority and the regional government that emerged initially in Saxony was a minority SPD one. The Communist group became the second largest in the Landtag in 1926. Party comrades submitted Lieberasch as their candidate to be First Deputy President of the Chamber, but the centrist and right-wing "bourgeois" parties joined together to block his election. The 1920s were a period of political instability in Saxon regional politics. Lieberasch was re-elected to it in 1926.

=== Party officer ===
As a member of the regional party leadership team ("KPD-Bezirksleitung") for western Saxony, Arthur Lieberasch was Secretary for Trades Union questions. In 1923, at the eighth party conference, he had been elected to the party's "Trades Union Commission" ("Gewerkschaftskommission"). By this time he was seen as part of the right win within the Communist Party which, during the 1920s, was falling increasingly into the hands of a younger generation of left-wingers.

=== Party split ===
The Communist Party finally split early in 1929. Within the Saxony party leadership his traditional trades union principals were not naturally compatible with the thesis of "social fascism" propounded by the hard-line doctrinaire Stalinists such as Rudolf Renner and Walter Ulbricht who were becoming increasingly powerful. In January 1929 Lieberasch was one of many excluded from the party around that time who then became founder members of the so-called Communist Party (Opposition) ("Kommunistische Partei Deutschlands (Opposition)" / KPO), and devoted himself to building up the party in Saxony. In the course of desperate attempts to unify the parties of the left in order to try to block the seemingly unstoppable rise of the Nazi Party, the KPO itself fragmented, but Lieberasch was among those who remained loyal to it until (and beyond) 1933.

=== Into exile ===
The Nazis took power in January 1933 and lost no time in transforming Germany into a one-party dictatorship. Non-Nazis with any sort of record of political activism, especially if it involved the Communist Party or the trades union movement, were at particular risk from the authorities. During the first half of 1933 many were arrested or fled abroad. Following an instruction from the party leadership, Arthur Liberasch crossed the frontier into Switzerland and settled in Schaffhausen, then as now on the edge of a small Swiss enclave surrounded on three sides, for reasons of topography, by German territory. He lived in Schaffhausen under conditions of serious impoverishment. For as long as possible he nevertheless supported illegal antifascist work across the frontier in Germany, working on the "Schaffhausener Arbeiterzeitung" (newspaper) and organising the transfer of printed material into Germany.

When first he arrived in Schaffhausen he was welcomed by Walther Bringolf, from whom he received significant support. Bringolf was a locally based leader of the Swiss Communist Party (Opposition) (" Kommunistische Partei der Schweiz-Opposition" / , KPS-O), a natural ally of the eponymous German party. After 1935, when Bringholf switched his allegiance to the Social Democrats, Lieberasch's life became more of a struggle. The workhouse found him work chopping wood. Fellow tramps knew that he was German and therefore identified him as a Nazi. There are nevertheless indications that until around 1938 Lieberasch was able to remain in touch with underground resistance groups in Leipzig. In 1939, like others in his position, he was deprived of his citizenship in absentia by the German government which left him stateless. It seems that he nevertheless received some financial support from international organisations that had been close to the German KPO in the past.

=== After the war ===
War, which had returned in 1939, formally ended in May 1945. Leipzig was now included in the large central portion of what had been Germany that was administered as the Soviet occupation zone (relaunched in October 1949 as the Soviet sponsored German Democratic Republic (East Germany)). It was not till June 1948, as his wife lay dying, that Arthur Liberasch was permitted to return to Leipzig. He lost no time in joining the Socialist Unity Party (SED), formed - if only in the Soviet zone - a couple of years earlier through a contentious merger of the old Communist Party and the Social Democrats. He now applied for recognition as a "Fighter against Fascism" ("Kämpfer gegen den Faschismus" / KgF). His application was turned down in January 1949 by the Mayor's Control Commission of the Municipal Section for Victims of Fascism". Walter Ulbricht, with whom he had clashed in the 1920s when they were both members of the Leipzig Communist Party, was by now the most powerful German in the Soviet occupation zone, as was a man with a famously long memory. However, Lieberasch lodged an objection with the appropriate appeal court and was recognised as a KgF in September 1949. The month he was given a job as a payroll clerk with VEB Vesta, a Leipzig-based iron and steel producer.

During the early 1950s the East German leadership revisited the party ructions which had led the Communist Party to split in 1928/29: surviving former KPO activists from that time were subjected to a succession of investigations and reprisals. Invited to write a statement of self-criticism, as was the normal Stalinist custom under such circumstances in East Germany, Arthur Lieberasch confined himself to a single sentence, from which the expected expressions of deep remorse were conspicuously absent: "Creating the KPO was not a mistake, but simply an offence against [party] discipline" ("Die Bildung der KPO war kein Fehler, sondern nur ein Verstoß gegen die Disziplin"). He was excluded from SED party membership in 1952. Particularly strident condemnation of Lieberasch had come in 1951 from Ernst Lohagen, the leader of the dominating SED group in the Saxon regional parliament ("Landtag"): "This Lieberasch today has his agents in the party. Not only that: he is himself a member of our SED (party) in the Leipzig region. This long standing 'professional enemy of the party' recently wrote a statement to the party about Brandler as follows, in what amounted to a moral justification of Brandler, 'Brandler was just another poor swine like me, and like me had nothing to wear', and so on" ("Dieser Lieberasch hat heute nicht nur seine Agenten in der Partei, sondern ist selbst Mitglied unserer SED im Kreis Leipzig. Dieser alte professionelle Parteifeind schrieb vor kurzem in einer Erklärung an die Partei über Brandler folgendes, was einer moralischen Rechtfertigung Brandlers gleichkommt: 'Brandler war genau so ein armes Schwein wie ich und hatte auch nichts anzuziehen', und so fort"). If Lohagen hoped to ingratiate himself with the leadership with this forthright criticism of Lieberasch, he failed. His own fall from grace, from a far higher level than that achieved after the war by Lieberasch, followed a few months after that of the older man. Meanwhile, comrades tempted to make contact with Arthur Lieberasch after 1952 risked party sanctions including, in some cases, exclusion from the party for themselves.

By 1957, taking its queue somewhat belatedly from Comrade Khrushchev, the East German government implemented a cautious amount of De-Stalinization during the course of which Arthur Lieberasch was readmitted to the party. During 1958 he was awarded the Medal for Fighters Against Fascism, which had initially been withheld from him.

Arthur Lieberasch died in Leipzig on 10 June 1967.
