= Medal for Fighters Against Fascism =

Award for those in the German Resistance against Nazism

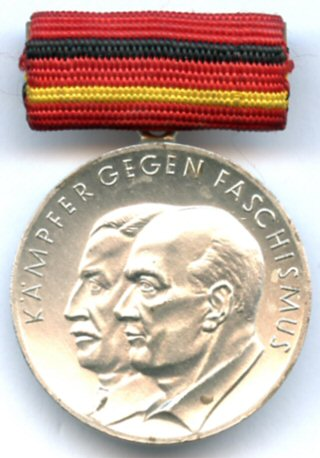
- Medal for Fighters Against Fascism (Obverse)
- Type: Single grade order
- Awarded for: Resistance against the Nazi regime 1933-45
- Presented by: GDR
- Status: No longer awarded
- Established: February 2, 1958
- Ribbon of the Medal for Fighters Against Fascism

The Medal for Fighters Against Fascism (German: Medaille für Kämpfer gegen den Faschismus 1933 bis 1945) was an award of the German Democratic Republic given to people who had been active in the German Resistance against Nazism.

== Institution and specifics of the award ==
The award was instituted on 22 February 1958 by the Council of Ministers and honoured those who had been involved in the resistance against the Nazi regime; for example, those confined to prisons or concentration camps or sentenced to hard labour, political émigrés, and also members of the International Brigades. Anti-Fascist activity in the National Committee for a Free Germany was also recognised, as in the case of Arno von Lenski (in 1940 made an honorary member of the Volksgerichtshof, later a Major General in the National People's Army of the GDR).

The medal could be awarded only once and only to individuals. It was presented by the Chairman of the Council of Ministers and was accompanied by a certificate. Beginning in 1964, all holders of the award received an honorarium of 600 marks.

== Description ==
The silver medal, 32 mm in diameter, depicts on the obverse profiles of Rudolf Breitscheid (rear) and Ernst Thälmann (front), looking to the left from the point of view of the observer and encircled in the upper half by the inscription KÄMPFER GEGEN FASCHISMUS (fighter against Fascism). On the reverse, the arms of the GDR are enclosed by the inscription VORWÄRTS UND NICHT VERGESSEN (forwards and forget not - top) and the years 1933 . 1945 (bottom).

The medal was worn on the left upper breast on a rectangular clip with red ribbon, initially 28 mm wide, beginning in 1959 reduced to 24 mm. A black, red and gold vertical bar 7.5 mm high was woven into the ribbon. The corresponding ribbon bar was of the same design.

== Notable recipients (partial list) ==
- 1958: Hermann Axen
- 1958: Martin Burkhardt
- 1958: Käthe Dahlem
- 1958: Arno von Lenski
- 1958: Peter Florin
- 1958: Paul Fröhlich
- 1958: Walter Hähnel
- 1958: Greta Kuckhoff
- 1958: Charlotte Küter
- 1958: Paul Lewitt
- 1958: Arthur Lieberasch
- 1958: Paul Meuter
- 1958: Karl Raddatz
- 1958: Heinrich Rau
- 1958: Elfriede Paul
- 1958: Paul Schwertz
- 1962: Elisa Úriz Pi, Spanish teacher, pedagogue and political activist, exiled in the GDR until her death.
- 1963: Hedwig Voegt (1903–1988)
- 1965: Aleksander Kulisiewicz
- 1967: Edith Braemer, Professor of Modern and Contemporary Literature, University of Leipzig
- 1971: Doris Wetterhahn
- unknown year: Ferdinand Jung (1905–1973)
