= Hindenburg Amnesties =

The Hindenburg Amnesties were a succession of four amnesties for certain groups of political prisoners in Germany. The largest Hindenburg Amnesty, in terms of the numbers released, took place in 1925, but there were further amnesties also termed Hindenburg Amnesties in 1928, 1932 and 1934. The background to the amnesties was the conviction of political extremists in the wake of the Revolutionary period of 1918-1919 that had followed military defeat in the First World War. During the 1920s the political emergency subsided and democratic government began to take root in Germany.

The 1925 Hindenburg Amnesty took place shortly after the election of Paul von Hindenburg as the country's president. It involved the release of approximately 29,000 people and came at the request of virtually all the political parties represented in the Reichstag, including the Communist and Nazi parties.

Grounds for the amnesties included a very widespread belief that the extent of the trials and convictions that had followed in the wake of economic and political collapse at the end of the war had simply overwhelmed the judicial system, which continued to lack the capacity, in terms of qualified judges and court staff, to redress the accumulation of judicial wrongs on a case-by-case basis. Inevitably the process also came to be seen increasingly as a political exercise whereby extremist parties that were now gaining some measure of acceptance with the political establishment could extract their own leaders from jails. High-profile beneficiaries of the Hindenburg Amnesties who later became key figures in the political establishment included Hermann Göring, Martin Bormann and Rudolf Höß. Beneficiaries from the other political extreme included Otto Franke.
