= Markt Rettenbach =

- Municipality
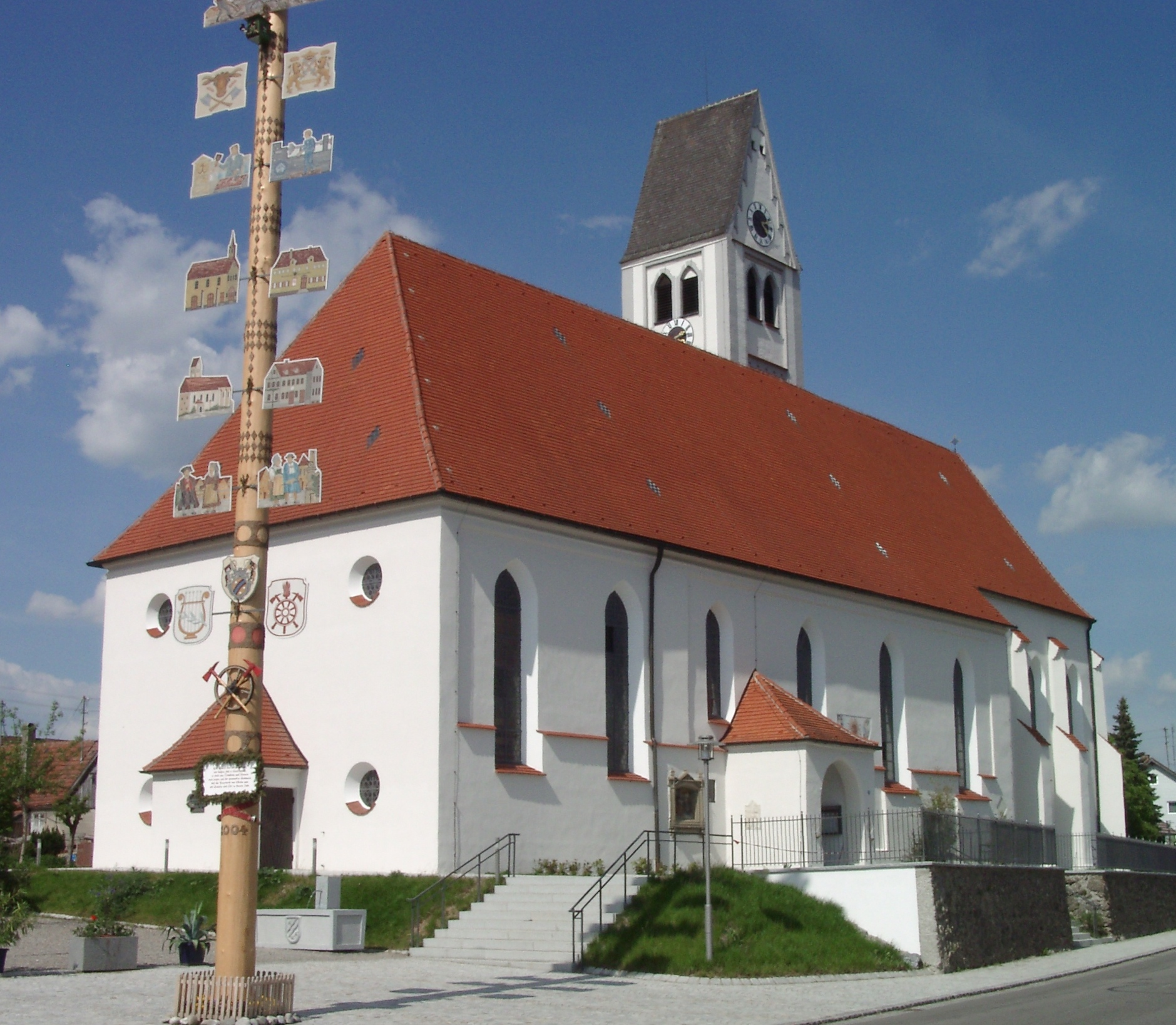
- Saint Jacob Church

- Coat of arms

- Location of Markt Rettenbach within Unterallgäu district
- Interactive map of Markt Rettenbach
- Location within Germany Location within Bavaria
- Coordinates: 47°56′51″N 10°23′42″E
- Country: Germany
- State: Bavaria
- Admin. region: Schwaben
- District: Unterallgäu

Government
  - Mayor (2020–26): Martin Hatzelmann

Area
  - Total: 51.41 km^{2} (19.85 sq mi)
- Elevation: 679 m (2,228 ft)

Population (2025-12-31)
  - Total: 4,037
  - Density: 78.53/km^{2} (203.4/sq mi)
- Time zone: UTC+01:00 (CET)
  - Summer (DST): UTC+02:00 (CEST)
- Postal codes: 87733
- Dialling codes: 08392
- Vehicle registration: MN
- Website: www.markt-rettenbach.de

Markt Rettenbach (German pronunciation: [maʁkt ˈʁɛtn̩bax]) is a municipality and market town in the district of Unterallgäu in Bavaria, Germany.
