= Walter Buchheim =

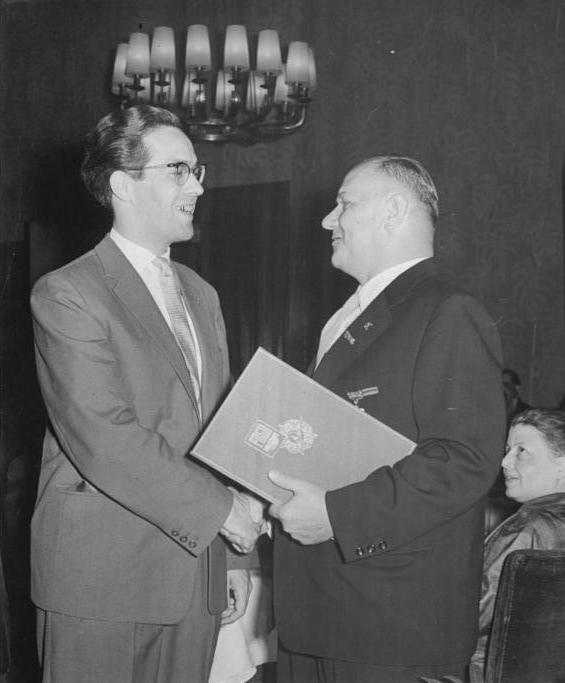
- Walter Buchheim (right)

Personal details
- Born: 28 January 1904 Pegau, Kingdom of Saxony, German Empire
- Died: 1 November 1979 (aged 75) East Germany
- Party: SED (Socialist Unity Party of Germany/ Sozialistische Einheitspartei Deutschlands)

Walter Buchheim (28 January 1904 – 1 November 1979) was an East German politician and Trade unionist.

He was the chairman of the national People's Solidarity organisation.

== Life ==
=== 1904-1933 Childhood and early adulthood in Weimar Germany ===
Buchheim's father was a shoe maker. The boy attended school in Cöllnitz and Groitzsch before training as a metal grinder between 1918 and 1922, and this defined his trade till 1929. Between 1929 and 1931 he worked as a miner in a brown coal mine.

Buchheim joined the Communist Youth league in 1923, performing various functions locally for the organisation. He joined the Communist Party (KVD) in 1926. Between 1931 and 1933 he was an elected town councillor and a full-time council officer in Groitzsch.

=== 1933–1945 Survival as a communist in Nazi Germany ===
After the National Socialist government came to power in 1933, Buchheim became involved in anti-Fascist resistance. He was arrested and imprisoned a number of times. His first period of imprisonment took place from August to November 1933. From 1934 till 1936 and again for three months in 1944 he was interned in the Sachsenhausen concentration camp. Following his release, in October 1944, he returned to his trade as a metal grinder till 1945.

=== 1945-1971 Vindication ===
From 1945 till 1949 Buchheim was a city councillor and the mayor of Groitzsch. Initially he served as a member of the KPD (Communist Party). However, this part of Germany was occupied by the Soviet military in 1945 and the Soviet Union took a hands-on approach to reconfiguring the political landscape. The Soviets favoured a one-party political structure. The SPD, along with the KPD (German Communist Party/Kommunistische Partei Deutschlands) were forcibly merged into the SED (Socialist Unity Party of Germany/Sozialistische Einheitspartei Deutschlands), of which Walter Buchheim now became a committed member.

In 1949 he attended the DASR (an Administration Academy for political high flyers subsequently renamed after Walter Ulbricht), in Forst Zinna, after which promotion beckoned. He was appointed to the senior administrative position of Landrat in the Zittau district in 1950/51. He then attended the party's administrative school in Meissen (1951/52). Between 1952 and 1959 he was First Secretary of the party's district leadership team in Karl-Marx-Stadt (which has subsequently reverted to its earlier name, Chemnitz), where he was also, between 1952 and 1958, a member of the regional assembly.

From 1954 till 1963 Walter Buchheim was a member of the party's powerful Central Committee, and between 1958 and 1963 he was also a deputy in the People's Chamber (the nation's legislative assembly).

In 1959 he was appointed Deputy Chairman of the Trades Union Federation, a position he retained till 1961 when he was appointed to the Chairmanship of the Central Committee of the national People's Solidarity organisation. Between 1969 and 1971 he was also a member of the Presidium of the East German National Front.

=== Retirement and death ===
He retired in 1971 and died in 1979. His ashes are in the Berlin Friedrichsfelde cemetery.

== Recognition ==
- Patriotic Order of Merit / VVO (Vaterländischer Verdienstorden) in Gold (1954)
- German Democratic Republic Service Medal (Verdienstmedaille der DDR) (1959)
- Ernst Moritz Arndt Medal (Ernst-Moritz-Arndt-Medaille)
- Honor Clasp on the VVO in Gold (1969)
- Order of Karl Marx (Karl-Marx-Orden) (1974)
