= Czechoslovakia–East Germany relations =

- Czechoslovakia: East Germany

Czechoslovakia–East Germany relations were historical foreign relations between Czechoslovakia and East Germany both of which are now-defunct states. Two countries signed their first joint declaration on 23 June 1950.

During the Cold War period both countries were members of Warsaw Pact and Comecon. East Germany provided logistics support but did not directly militarily invade Czechoslovakia during the Warsaw Pact invasion of Czechoslovakia. Within the Eastern Bloc two countries shared certain set of similarities such as similar levels of economic development, regional proximity, the border with the Western Bloc and as well the fact that after a protracted period of confrontation German and Czechoslovak states were formally close allies.

In 1989 over 2,000 East German citizens rushed the West German Embassy in Prague in an effort to emigrate to the west.

== See also ==
- Tři oříšky pro Popelku
- Vindobona (train)
- Czech Republic–Germany relations
- Germany–Slovakia relations
