= Vainrub =

Vainrub is a surname. Notable people with the surname include:

- Matvei Vainrub (1910–1998), Soviet Lieutenant-General
- Yevsei Vainrub (1909–2003), Soviet Colonel
