= List of Jewish Heroes of the Soviet Union =

This is a list of people awarded the title Hero of the Soviet Union who were either listed as Jewish on their internal passports or born to a Jewish mother.

- Shetiel Abramov
- Abram Abramovich ru
- Abrek Barsht
- Yefim Belinsky ru
- Yevel Belyavin ru
- Leonid Berdichevsky ru
- Yefim Berezovsky ru
- Izrail Beskin ru
- Yevgeny Birbraer ru
- Aleksandr Bluvshtein ru
- Samuil Bogorad ru
- Nikolai Brozgol ru
- Leonid Buber ru
- Iosif Bumagin ru
- Iosif Chaykovsky ru
- Yakov Chapichev ru
- Milya Felzenshtein ru
- Israel Fisanovich
- Yakov Forzun ru
- Yefim Fradkov ru
- Mark Gallay ru
- Grigory Gardeman ru
- Grigory Garfunkin ru
- Polina Gelman
- Semyon Gelferg ru
- Volko Gefter ru
- Lev Gitman ru
- Grigory Gonchar ru
- Haskel Gopnik ru
- Zinovy Gorelik ru
- Solomon Gorelik ru
- Emmanuil Gotlib ru
- Genrikh Gofman ru
- Mikhail Grabsky
- Semyon Gurvich ru
- Mikhail Gurevich ru
- Isaak Dvukhbabny ru
- Grigory Dernovsky ru
- Yuri Dolzhansky ru
- David Dragunsky (twice)
- Semyon Drizovsky ru
- Yefim Dyskin ru
- Isay Illazarov ru
- Yuliush Hinber ru
- Isay Kazinets ru
- Lazar Kaplan ru
- Arkady Kaplunov
- Ilya Katunin ru
- Vladimir Khalo ru
- Viktor Khasin ru
- Volf Khatskevich ru
- Semyon Kheyfets ru
- Boris Khigrin ru
- Moisey Khokhlov ru
- Vladimir Konovalov
- Zinovy Kontsevoy ru
- Shik Koronsky ru
- Volf Korsunsky ru
- Leonty Kotlyar ru
- Boris Kotlyarsky ru
- Vladimir Kolpakchi
- Mordukh Kravets ru
- Haim Krasnokutsky ru
- Yakov Kreizer
- Simon Kremer ru
- Semyon Krivoshein
- Ilya Krichevsky ru
- David Kudryavitsky ru
- Tsezar Kunikov
- Izrail Kupershtein ru
- Boris Lev ru
- Yefim Lev ru
- Rafail Lev ru
- Boris Levin ru
- Semyon Levin ru
- Vladimir Levitan ru
- Aleksandr Letuchy ru
- Mikhail Libman ru
- Boris Lunts ru
- Iosif Makovsky ru
- Lev Manevich ru
- David Margulis ru
- Lev Margulyan ru
- Moisey Maryanovsky ru
- Shabsa Mashkautsan ru
- Grigory Mats ru
- Yefim Melakh ru
- Dmitry Medvedev
- Rafail Milner ru
- Nikolai Molochnikov ru
- Mikhail Nepinnyashchy ru
- Aleksandr Orlikov ru
- Mikhail Ocheret ru
- Rafail Pavlovsky ru
- Mikhail Pavlotsky ru
- Lazar Papernik ru
- Naum Pausakhovsky ru
- Mikhail Plotkin ru
- Natan Polyusuk ru
- Grigory Provanov ru
- Vladimir Prygov ru
- Maksim Rapeyko ru
- Boris Rivkin ru
- Veniamin Ruvinsky ru
- Abram Saposhnikov ru
- Abram Sverdlov ru
- Semyon Selsky ru
- Iosif Serper ru
- Idel Shandalov ru
- Valentin Shapiro ru
- Moisey Shakhnovich ru
- Moisey Shvartsman ru
- Mark Shevelov ru
- Aron Shinder ru
- Mikhail Shneyderman ru
- Grigory Shtern
- Kalmanis Shuras ru
- Abram Smolyakov ru
- Yakov Smushkevich (twice)
- Rudolf Sokolinsky ru
- Moisey Spivak ru
- Yefim Sterin ru
- Natan Stratievsky ru
- Pyotr Tavrovsky ru
- Abram Temnik ru
- Boris Tsindelis ru
- Yefim Tsitovsky ru
- Pinkhus Turyan
- Grigory Ushpolis ru
- Yevsei Vainrub
- Matvei Vainrub
- Boris Vaunshtein ru
- Vladimir Vaiser ru
- Isaak Vaksman ru
- Mikhail Valyansky ru
- Yakov Vernikov
- Volfas Vilenskis ru
- Grigory Vinogradov ru
- Zalman Vikhnin ru
- Boris Volynov (twice)
- Girsh Yudashkin ru
- Iosif Yufa ru
- Izrail Yakubovsky ru
- Naum Zholudev ru
- Abram Zindels ru
- Yefim Zlatin ru
