= Pinkhus =

Pinkhus is a Jewish masculine given name often used among Ashkenazi Jews. Notable people with the name include:

- Pinkhus Rovner (1875–1919), Bolshevik revolutionary from Ukraine
- Pinkhus Turyan (1896–1976), Soviet military officer from Ukraine
