= Leila Mardanshina =

Soviet and Russian oil and gas operator

- Ляйла Марданшина
- Born: Leila Hanipovna Mardanshina; 15 May 1927; Verkhnemancharovo, Birsky District, Bashkir Autonomous Soviet Socialist Republic, Russian SFSR
- Died: 10 September 2017 (aged 90); Oktyabrsky, Republic of Bashkortostan, Russia
- Occupations: Oil and gas operator
- Years active: 1944–1985
- Awards: Hero of Socialist Labour; Order of Lenin; Order of the Badge of Honour; Medal "For Distinguished Labour"

Leila Hanipovna Mardanshina (Russian: Ляйла Ханиповна Марданшина; 15 May 1927 – 10 September 2017) was a Soviet and Russian oil and gas operator who worked at the No. 2 oil field of the Tuimazaneft Oil Production Department from 1946 to 1985. She was also involved in social and political work as a deputy of the Supreme Soviet of the Bashkir ASSR between 1956 and 1960 and as a deputy of the seventh convocation of the Supreme Soviet of the Soviet Union from 1966 to 1970. Mardanshina was awarded the Hero of Socialist Labour, the Order of Lenin, the Order of the Badge of Honour and the Medal "For Distinguished Labour".

== Biography ==
On 15 May 1927, Mardanshina was born in the village of Verkhnemancharovo, Birsky District, Bashkir Autonomous Soviet Socialist Republic (today the Ilishevsky District, Republic of Bashkortostan). She and her family relocated to Almachik soon after she was born. Following her graduation from school after ten years, Mardanshina began working as a teacher at the Kazy-Eldyak elementary school (part of Bayagildin Village Council) in the Dyurtyulinskii District in 1944.

At the request of her brother, she relocated to Sotsgorod and began working as the assistant for oil and gas production at the No. 2 oil field of the Tuimazaneft Oil Production Department in 1946. Mardanshina remained at the post until 1985. In 1947, she was appointed operator for oil and gas production and was moved to the company's No. 5 oil field four years later. Mardanshina worked with 16 oil wells as well as maintaining others. She was required to pump the production of oil hourly from the measuring tank to the tanks by hand in an era where this process was not mechanised. At some wells she oversaw, Mardanshina conducted assignments introducing and developing new equipment and field radio dispatching experiments, took part in testing of two new equipment designs developed the by the design bureau of oil instrumentation. She stopped working as an oil and gas production operator in 1971.

Mardanshina served as deputy chair of the trade union committee of the NGDU between 1971 and 1981. She worked to better the role of trade union organisations in collectives' lives, developing competition and disseminating improved practices. Mardanshina was the head of the NGDU's technical office at the Museum of Labour Glory of the Tuymazaneft Oil and Gas Production Department in the House of Technology from 1981. She also had an active role in the social and political scene. Mardanshina was a deputy of the fifth convocation of Supreme Soviet of the Bashkir Autonomous Soviet Socialist Republic between 1956 and 1960 and a deputy of the seventh convocation of the Supreme Soviet of the Soviet Union from 1966 to 1970. She served on the Oktyabrsky City Council of Workers' Deputies. On 10 September 2017, Mardanshina died in Oktyabrsky, Republic of Bashkortostan.

== Awards ==
Mardanshina received high-ranking state awards for her work. On 19 March 1959, she was awarded the Hero of Socialist Labour with the Order of Lenin and the "Hammer and Sickle" gold medal "for the outstanding successes achieved in the development of the oil and gas industry." Mardanshina received the Order of the Badge of Honour in 1962.

She earned the Honored Oilman of the Bashkir ASSR in 1976 and the Honorary Oilman of the USSR a year later. Mardanshina was awarded the title of Honorary Citizen of the City of Oktyabrsky by the executive committee of the Council of People's Deputies on 14 April 1983 and also earned the Medal "For Distinguished Labour". In 2021, a memorial plaque was unveiled at her place of residence in Oktyabrsky. A street in Oktyabrsky is named for Mardanshina.
