= Berdichevsky =

Berdichevsky or Berdyczewski is a family name derived from the city of Berdichev, Ukraine. It may refer to:

- Adam Berdichevsky (born 1983), Israeli Paralympic wheelchair tennis player
- Cecilia Berdichevsky (1925–2010), Argentine computer scientist
- Leonid Berdichevsky, Jewish Hero of the Soviet Union
- Micha Josef Berdyczewski (1865–1921), Ukrainian-born writer and journalist
