= Boyarski =

Boyarski is a surname. Notable people with the surname include:

- Gertrude Boyarski (1922–2012), Polish partisan fighter and Holocaust survivor
- Jason Boyarski (born 1974), American lawyer
