= Beilenson =

Beilenson is a surname. Notable people with the surname include:

- Anthony Beilenson (1932–2017), American politician
- Edna Beilenson (1909–1981), American typographer, fine press printer, typesetter, book designer, cook book author, and publisher

== See also ==
- Beilinson
