= Order of the Badge of Honour =

Award of the Soviet Union

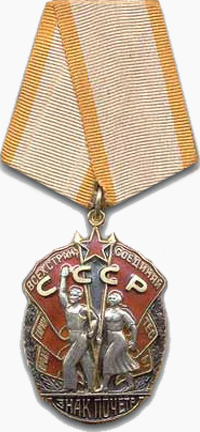
- Order of the Badge of Honour
- Type: Single grade order
- Awarded for: accomplishments in labour, the civil service, literature, the arts and sciences
- Presented by: the Soviet Union
- Eligibility: Soviet citizens and institutions including factories
- Status: No longer awarded
- Established: 25 November 1935
- First award: 26 November 1935
- Final award: 23 December 1988

Highlights
- Total: 1 580 850
- Ribbon of the Badge of Honour

Precedence
- Next (higher): Order of Friendship of Peoples
- Next (lower): Order of Labour Glory

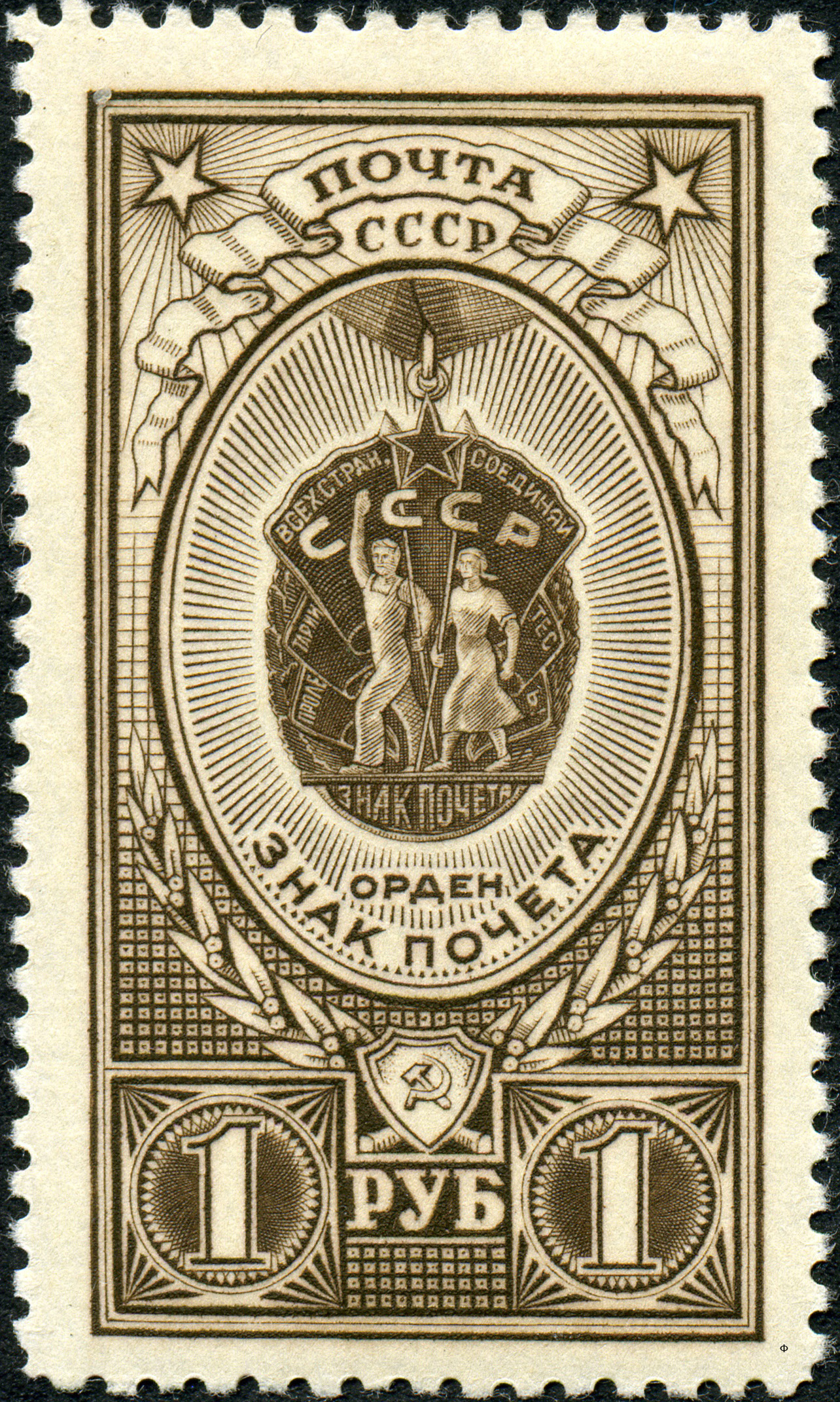
Order of the Badge of Honour depicted on a 1951 stamp

The Order of the Badge of Honour (Russian: орден «Знак Почёта», romanized: orden "Znak Pochyota") was a civilian award of the Soviet Union.

It was established on 25 November 1935, and was conferred on citizens of the USSR for outstanding achievements in sports, production, scientific research and social, cultural and other forms of social activity; for promotion of economic, scientific, technological, cultural and other ties between the USSR and other countries; and also for significant contribution to basic and applied research.

The order was awarded 1,574,368 times.

The "Order of the Badge of Honour" was replaced by the "Order of Honour" (Russian: Орден Почёта) by a Decree of the Presidium of the USSR on 28 December 1988. Following the USSR dissolution, it was replaced by the "Order of Honour" of Russia, established by Presidential Decree no. 442 of 2 March 1994.

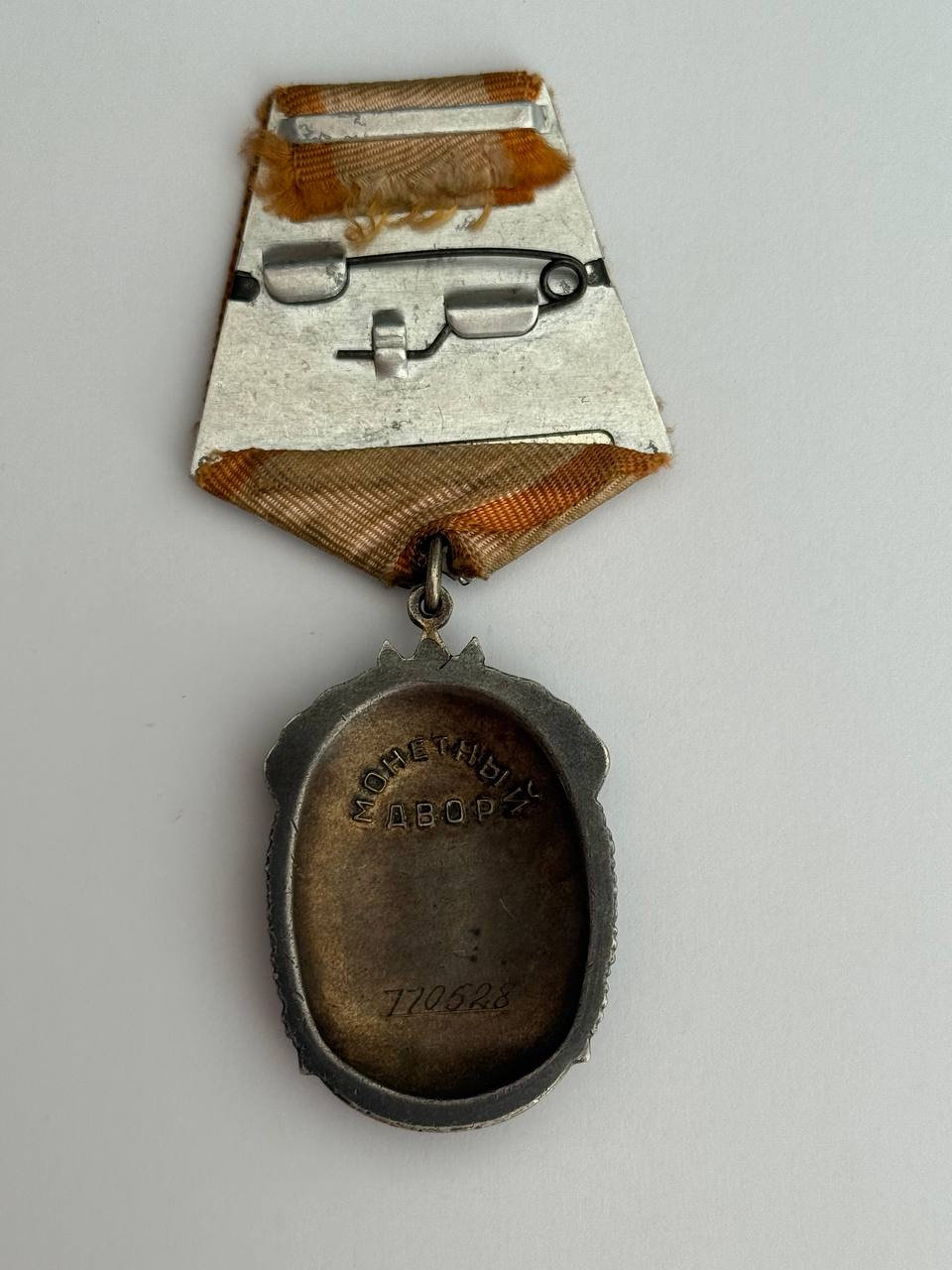
Order of the Badge of Honour reverse

== Notable recipients ==
- Alisa Aksyonova
- Svetlana Alexievich
- Araxie Babayan
- Vadim Bakatin
- Aliya Beysenova
- Fyokla Bezzubova
- Vasili Blokhin
- Evdokia Bobyleva
- Oleg Bogomolov
- Mariya Borodayevskaya
- Volodymyr Boyko
- Boris Dobrodeev
- Ivan Dubasov
- Alaksandar Dubko
- Kim Pen Hwa
- Faina Kotkowa
- Viacheslav Fetisov
- Mikhail Gorbachev
- Niko Gotsiridze
- Anna Haava
- Zulfi Hajiyev
- Yaroslav Halan
- Rufina Isakova
- Kasymaly Jantöshev
- Ivan Kalita
- Oleg Kalugin
- Shavarsh Karapetyan
- Klaudia Sergejewna Kildisheva
- Sergey Korolyov
- Galina Kulakova
- Aleksandr Kurlovich
- Viktor Kuzkin
- Valentin Ivanov
- Heli Lääts
- Larisa Latynina
- Vladimir Lutchenko
- Aleksandr Maltsev
- Leila Mardanshina
- Boris Mayorov
- Natalya Meklin
- Natalya Melik Melikyan
- Mark Midler
- Mariya Orlyk
- Alexander Ragulin
- Vladimir Rvachev
- Galina Serdyukovskaya
- Ninel Shakhova
- Galina Skakun
- Anatoliy Smirnov
- Vitali Smirnov
- Pavel Sukhoi
- Amet-khan Sultan
- Gunsyn Tsydenova
- Tankho Israelov
- Alina Vedmid
- Boris Yeltsin
- Sorojon Yusufova
- Igor Ursov
- Shakirat Utegaziyev
- Dimitri Venediktov
- Valery Khodemchuk
- Nina Viktorovna Pigulevskaya
- Eliso Virsaladze
- Alexander Aslanikashvili
- Oleksandr Mykolayovych Kovalenko
- Igor Zotikov
- Alexey Dobryden
- Tagan Babaeva

== See also ==
- Order of Honour (Russia)
- Awards and decorations of the Soviet Union
- Awards and decorations of the Russian Federation
