= Tagan Babaeva =

Turkmen-Soviet politician

- Таган Бабаева
- Born: 1915; Kyzyl-Arvat, Transcaspia, Russian Empire
- Died: 1995 (aged 79–80); Ashgabat, Turkmenistan
- Occupation: politician
- Years active: 1932–1975

Tagan Babaeva (Russian: Таган Бабаева, 1915–1995) was a Turkmen-Soviet politician who served as a deputy in the Supreme Soviet of the Turkmen Soviet Socialist Republic for four terms between 1951 and 1963. In 1947, she served as the Deputy Chair of the Presidium of the Turkmen SSR and as its secretary from 1953 to 1975. She was honored with the Order of the Red Banner of Labor and Order of the Badge of Honour in 1957 and the medal "For Valiant Labor" in 1960. She received a certificate in honor of her service to the Presidium in 1975.

== Biography ==
Babaeva was born into a working-class family from Kyzyl-Arvat, in the Transcaspian region of the Russian Empire in 1915. In 1926, she began learning the trade of carpet weaving at factory school in Kizyl-Arvat. Between 1932 and 1936, she worked as a weaver in the carpet union and in 1937 entered the technical school in Ashgabat, where she studied until 1940. Upon completion of her schooling she became an Assistant Prosecutor of the Turkmen Soviet Socialist Republic. In 1943, she was promoted to head the legal department and simultaneously elected as a Deputy.

Babaeva became the Deputy Chair of the Presidium of the Turkmen SSR in 1947. She was elected to the Supreme Soviet of the Turkmen SSR in 1951, 1953, 1959, and 1963. Simultaneously she served as the Secretary of the Turkman Presidium from 1953 to 1975 and as the chair of the Executive Committee of the Ashgabat Oblast from 1953. For her meritorious service she was awarded the Order of the Red Banner of Labour and the Order of the Badge of Honour in 1957. In 1960, she was honored with the medal "For Valiant Labor" and in 1975 was awarded a certificate of merit from the Presidium.

Babaeva's obituary appeared in the Туркменская Искра (Turkmen Spark) on 18 July 1995. She died in Ashgabat, Turkmenistan.
