= Order of Lenin =

Highest civilian honor of the Soviet Union

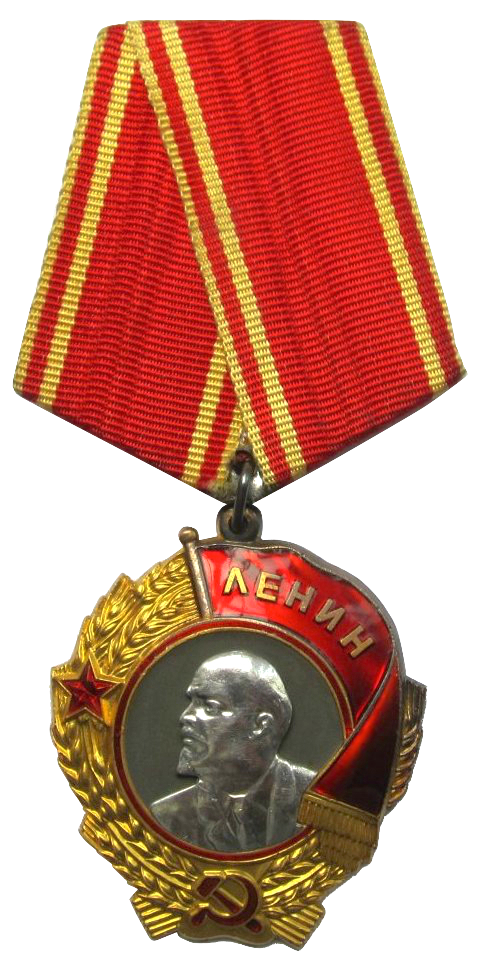
- Order of Lenin, Type 4 awarded from 1943 to 1991
- Type: Single-grade order
- Awarded for: outstanding services rendered to the State, exemplary service in the armed forces; promoting friendship and cooperation between people and in strengthening peace, and; meritorious services to the Soviet state and society
- Country: Soviet Union
- Presented by: Soviet Union
- Eligibility: Citizens of the Soviet Union; foreigners; institutions, enterprises and collectives
- Status: Awarded only by the CPRF
- Established: 6 April 1930
- First award: 23 May 1930
- Final award: 21 December 1991

Highlights
- Total: 431,418
- Ribbon of the Order of Lenin

Precedence
- Next (lower): Order of the October Revolution

Order of Lenin, type 3

The Order of Lenin (Russian: Орден Ленина, romanized: Orden Lenina, pronounced [ˈordʲɪn ˈlʲenʲɪnə]) was an award named after Vladimir Lenin, the leader of the October Revolution. It was established by the Central Executive Committee on 6 April 1930. The order was the highest civilian decoration bestowed by the Soviet Union. The order was awarded to:

- Civilians for outstanding services rendered to the State
- Members of the armed forces for exemplary service
- Those who promoted friendship and cooperation between people and in strengthening peace
- Those with meritorious services to the Soviet state and society

From 1944 to 1957, before the institution of specific length of service medals, the Order of Lenin was also used to reward 25 years of conspicuous military service. Those who were awarded the titles "Hero of the Soviet Union" and "Hero of Socialist Labour" were also given the order as part of the award. It was also bestowed on cities, companies, factories, regions, military units, and ships. Various educational institutions and military units who received the said Order applied the full name of the order into their official titles.

== Design ==
The first design of the Order of Lenin was sculpted by Pyotr Tayozhny and Ivan Shadr based on sketches by Ivan Dubasov. It was made by Goznak of silver with some lightly gold-plated features. It was a round badge with a central disc featuring Vladimir Lenin's profile surrounded by smokestacks, a tractor and a building, possibly a power plant. A thin red-enamelled border and a circle of wheat panicles surrounded the disc. At the top was a gold-plated "hammer and sickle" emblem, and at the bottom were the Russian initials for "USSR" (Russian: СССР) in red enamel. Only about 800 of this design were minted. It was awarded between 1930 and 1932.

The second design was awarded from 1934 until 1936. This was a solid gold badge, featuring a silver plated disc bearing Lenin's portrait. The disc is surrounded by two golden panicles of wheat, and a red flag with "LENIN" in Cyrillic script (Russian: ЛЕНИН). A red star is placed on the left and the "hammer and sickle" emblem at the bottom, both in red enamel.

The third design was awarded from 1936 until 1943. The design was the same as previous, but the central disc was gray enamelled and Lenin's portrait was a separate piece made of platinum fixed by rivets.

The fourth design was awarded from 1943 until 1991. Design was the same as previous, but was worn as a medal suspended from a ribbon (all previous were screwback).

The badge was originally worn by screwback on the left chest without a ribbon. Later it was worn as a medal suspended from a red ribbon with pairs of yellow stripes at the edges (see image above). The ribbon bar is of the same design. The portrait of Lenin was originally a riveted silver piece. For a time it was incorporated into a one-piece gold badge, but finally returned as a separate platinum piece until the dissolution of the USSR in 1991.

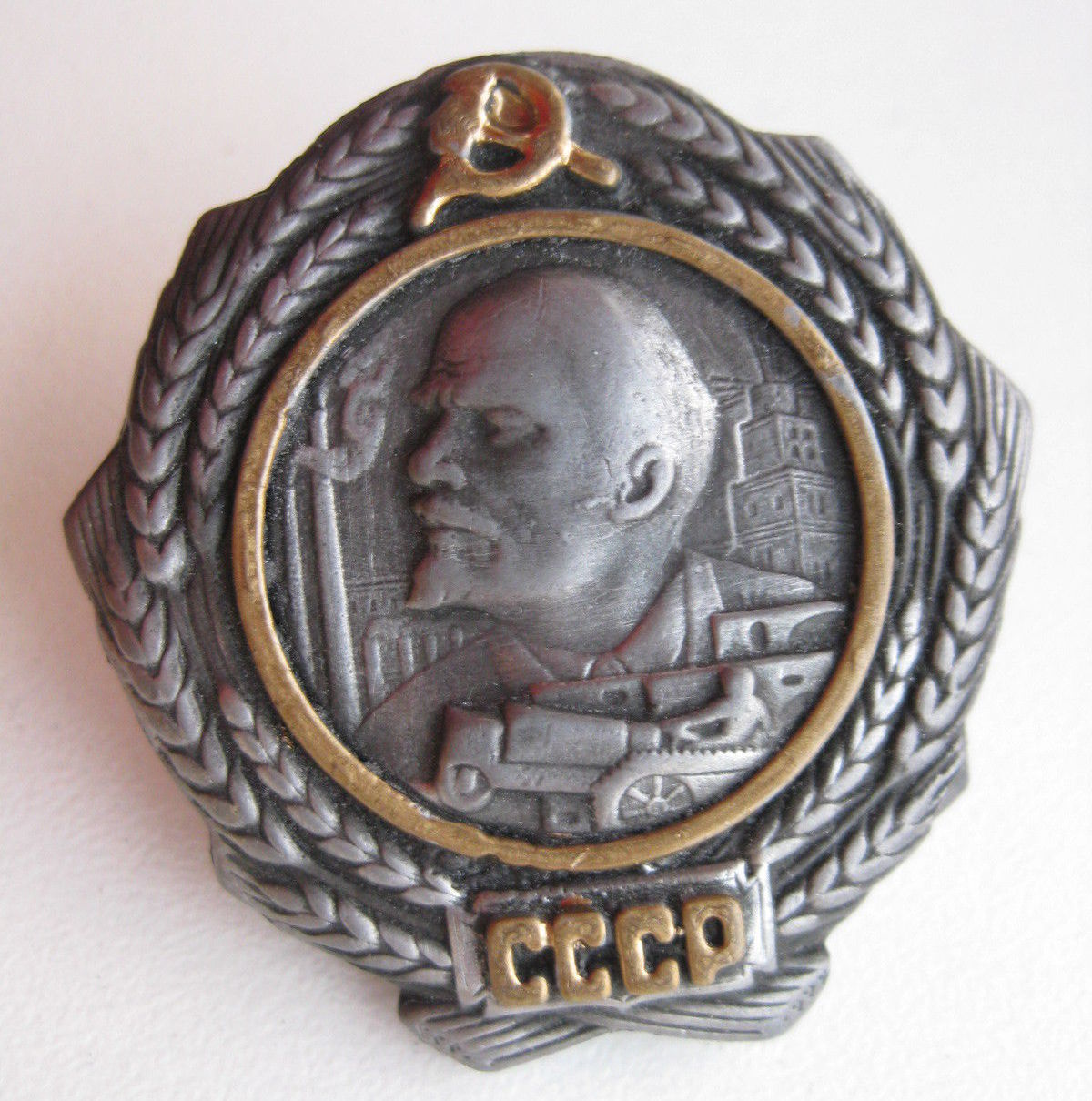
Order of Lenin type 1 (1930–32)

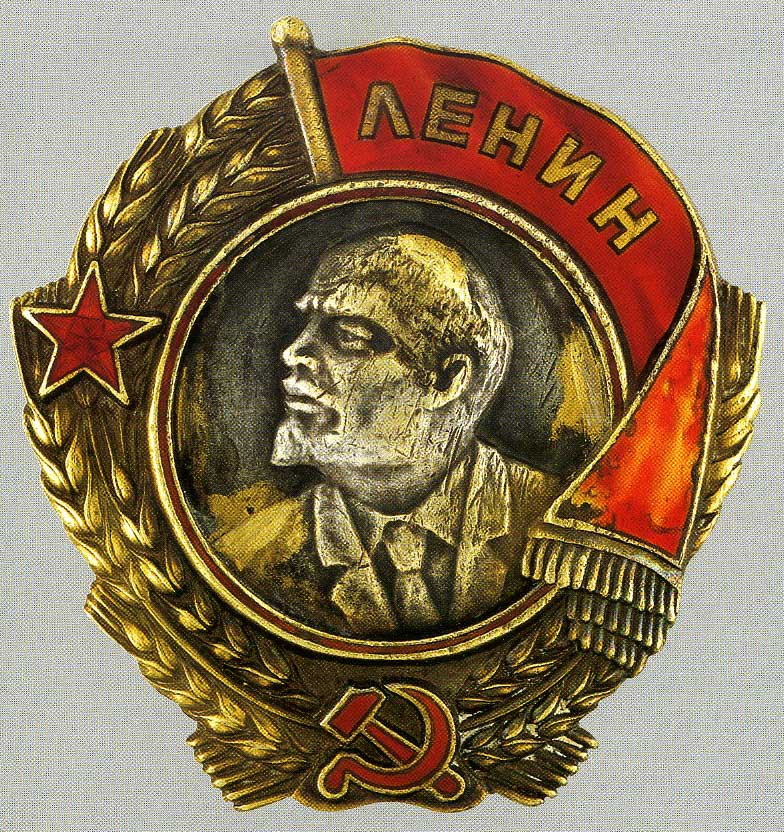
Order of Lenin type 2 (1934–36)

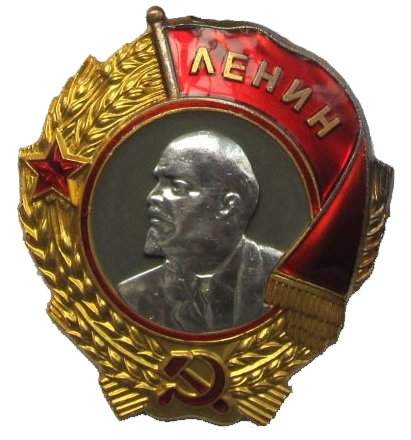
Order of Lenin type 3 (1936–43)

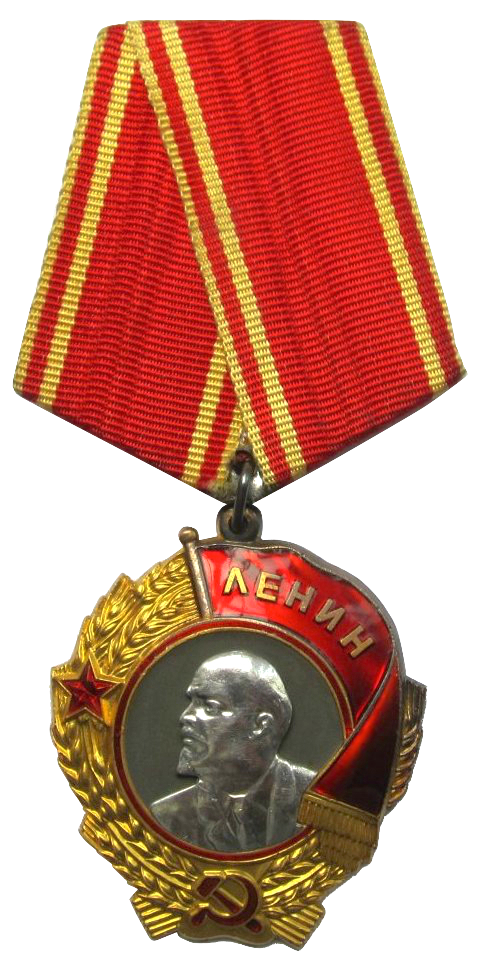
Order of Lenin type 4 (1943–91)

== Recipients ==
The first Order of Lenin was awarded to the newspaper Komsomolskaya Pravda on 23 May 1930. Also among the first ten recipients were five industrial companies, three pilots, and the Secretary to the Central Executive Committee Avel Yenukidze. The first person to be awarded a second Order of Lenin was the pilot Valery Chkalov in 1936. Another pilot, Vladimir Kokkinaki, became the first to receive a third Order in 1939.

The first five foreign recipients – who were presented with the Order on 17 May 1932 – comprised a German and four US citizens, one of whom was Frank Bruno Honey. They received the award for helping in the reconstruction of Soviet industry and agriculture, during 1931–1934.

In total, 431,418 orders were awarded, with the last on 21 December 1991.

In 2025, multiple news agencies mistakenly reported that Russian President Vladimir Putin gave an Order of Lenin to Steve Witkoff, United States President Donald Trump's de facto Russian envoy, to in-turn pass along to Juliane Gallina, the CIA's Deputy Director for Digital Innovation, whose son (Michael Gloss) was killed in 2024 while fighting for Russia in their ongoing war with Ukraine. In actuality, the award given was an Order of Courage.

=== Most frequent ===
- 11 times:
  - Nikolai Patolichev, longtime Minister for Foreign Trade of the USSR
  - Dmitry Ustinov, Defence Minister (1976–1984)
- 10 times:
  - Efim Slavsky, Head of Sredmash, the ministry responsible for nuclear industry (1957–1986)
  - Alexander Yakovlev, aircraft designer
  - Sharaf Rashidov, Soviet statesman, writer.
- 9 times:
  - Pyotr Dementyev, Minister of Aviation Industry (1953–1977)
  - Vasily Ryabikov, defence industry official, co-head (together with Sergey Korolev) of the first Sputnik project
  - Nikolay Semyonov, winner of 1956 Nobel Prize in chemistry
  - Anatoly Alexandrov, President of the Soviet Academy of Sciences (1975–1986)
  - Vasily Chuikov, World War II commander
  - Dzhabar Rasulov, First Secretary of the Communist Party of Tajikistan
  - Ivan Papanin, polar explorer
- 8 times:
  - Leonid Brezhnev, General Secretary of the Communist Party of the Soviet Union
  - Kliment Voroshilov, Marshal of the Soviet Union
  - Trofim Lysenko, agronomist

=== Notable collective recipients ===
- All fifteen republics of the Soviet Union
- Komsomol, the Young Communist League
- LOMO, Leningrad Optical-Mechanical Corporation
- ZIL, automobile manufacturer (for their manufacturing of weapons and ammunition)
- Kryvorizhstal, massively successful and profitable steel mill
- Moscow Region
- Komsomolskaya Pravda newspaper
- Pravda newspaper
- Cities of Moscow, Donetsk, and Yekaterinburg
- 62nd Army for extraordinary valor in the defence of Stalingrad
- Saint Petersburg Electrotechnical University "LETI"
- MV Stary Bolshevik, for the courage in Convoy PQ 16 (World War II)

=== Notable individual recipients ===
- Sergey Afanasyev (Soviet "Space Minister", awarded 7 times)
- Biju Patnaik (Indian Pilot & Politician)
- Aziz Aliyev (Azerbaijani and Dagestani politician and scientist, awarded 2 times)
- Viktor Ambartsumian (Armenian astrophysist)
- Sona Akhundova-Bagirbekova (Azerbaijani ophthalmologist)
- George Avakian American record producer who promoted international musical exchange between Russian and American musicians.
- Ivan Bagramyan (Soviet Armenian Marshal)
- Yakov Beilinson (Soviet naval executive, awarded 2 times)
- Kateryna Boloshkevich (Ukrainian weaver and statesperson, awarded 2 times)
- Valeriy Borzov (Soviet Ukrainian sprinter)
- Gertrude Boyarski (Polish partisan during WWII)
- Emilian Bukov (Soviet writer for the Moldavian SSR, awarded 2 times)
- Lyudmila Byakova (Russian seamstress)
- Sukarno (President of Indonesia)
- Fidel Castro (President of Cuba)
- Konstantin Chelpan (Chief designer of the T-34 tank engine)
- Luis Corvalán (secretary general of the Communist Party of Chile)
- Álvaro Cunhal (Portuguese politician and writer; instrumental in the overthrow of the fascist dictatorial regime of Estado Novo)
- Shripad Amrit Dange (Indian Communist leader who had strongly endorsed pro-Soviet views)
- Mario Del Monaco (Italian tenor)
- Valentina Dimitrieva (farm worker)
- Chandra Rajeswara Rao (He was one of the leaders of the Telangana Rebellion (1946–1951). He also worked as Communist Party of India (CPI) General Secretary for 28 years, was awarded the Order of Lenin in 1974.)
- Joseph Davies (American diplomat who strongly supported Stalin and the Soviet Union)
- Yevgeniya Dolinyuk (Ukrainian kolkhoznik, politician and writer)
- Sergei Eisenstein (film director)
- Roza Eldarova (Chairwoman of the Presidium of the Supreme Soviet of the Dagestan ASSR, member of the Presidium of the Supreme Soviet of the RSFSR)
- Zinaida Yermolyeva (biochemist, independently synthesized penicillin for the Soviet military during World War II)
- Muhammed Faris (Syrian research cosmonaut, 30 July 1987)
- Valentina Gaganova (Russian textile worker, awarded twice)
- Yuri Gagarin (Cosmonaut, first human being in outer space)
- Israel Gelfand (Soviet mathematician, awarded 3 times)
- Mikhail Girshovich (Major-General)
- Kim Pen Hwa (collective farm manager, awarded 4 times)
- Enver Hoxha (Leader of the People's Republic of Albania)
- Pinkhus Turyan (Soviet Captain)
- Otto Grotewohl (former prime minister of GDR)
- Armand Hammer (American businessman and philanthropist)
- Charlton Haw (fighter pilot of the Royal Air Force)
- Erich Honecker (former leader of GDR)
- Kurt Kieß (GDR politician, party secretary of Soviet-German uranium mining company Wismut)
- Georgy Kondratiev, physicist
- Alfred Rohde (GDR politician, party secretary of Soviet-German uranium mining company Wismut)
- Sergey Ilyushin (Soviet pilot and aircraft designer, awarded 8 times)
- Wojciech Jaruzelski (former leader of People's Republic of Poland)
- Mikhail Kalashnikov (designer of the AK-47, AKM, AK-74 and AK-100 assault rifles along with RPK and PK machine guns)
- Saima Karimova, (Russian geologist 1926–2013)
- Juho Kusti Paasikivi (President of Finland 1946–1956)
- Urho Kekkonen (President of Finland 1956–1982)
- Mauno Koivisto (President of Finland 1982–1994)
- Raïssa Koublitskaïa (Soviet Belarusian agricultural worker and politician, awarded twice)
- Nikita Khrushchev (Chairman of the Council of Peoples Commissars, Soviet Union)
- Klavdiya Kildisheva (1917–1994), aviation engineer and Hero of Socialist Labor
- Kim Il Sung (President of North Korea, awarded 2 times)
- Yevheniia Kucherenko (Ukrainian pedagogue of the Ukrainian language and literature)
- Igor Kurchatov (physicist, leader of the Soviet atomic bomb project, awarded 5 times)
- Yanka Kupala (Belarusian poet, for the book «Ад сэрца» [From the heart])
- Vladimir Komarov (Cosmonaut, first cosmonaut to fly in space twice and first man to die on a space mission, awarded twice)
- Vladimir Konovalov (sub-commander and admiral, awarded 3 times)
- Aleksey Krylov (Russian naval engineer, applied mathematician and memoirist, awarded 3 times)
- Luigi Longo (Italy; Political commissar of the XII International Brigade in Spain (1936–1938), deputy commander of the Freedom Volunteers Corp (1943–1945) and secretary (1964–1972) and president (1972–1980) of the Italian Communist Party)
- Fariza Magomadova (Chechen boarding school director and pioneer for women's education)
- Nelson Mandela (South African President)
- Leila Mardanshina (Soviet gas and oil operator)
- Kirill Mazurov (Belarusian Soviet politician)
- Ramón Mercader (Spanish NKVD agent, assassinated Leon Trotsky)
- Boris Mikhailov (Soviet ice hockey team captain in the 1970s and 1980s)
- Shoista Mullojonova (Bukharian Jewish Shashmakom singer)
- Alexander Morozov (designer of the T-64 tank)
- Elena Mukhina (gymnast, 1960–2006)
- Rahmon Nabiyev (First Secretary of the Communist party of Tajikistan, later president of Tajikistan)
- Aleksandr Nadiradze (Soviet Georgian scientist who developed the first mobile ICBM systems)
- Gamal Abdel Nasser (Egyptian president)
- Rusudana Nikoladze (Georgian inorganic chemist)
- Rudolf Abel (Soviet spy)
- Fyodor Okhlopkov (World War II hero)
- Nikolai Ostrovsky (Soviet author, 1904–1936)
- Lyudmila Pavlichenko (Soviet sniper World War II, two times)
- Yevgeny Pepelyaev (fighter pilot in the Korean War)
- Kim Philby (British/Soviet double agent)
- Leida Peips (Estonian milker)
- Maya Plisetskaya (Prima Ballerina Bolshoi Ballet Company, one time 1964)
- Miriam Rakhmankulova (Soviet composer and singer)
- Neville Ramsbottom-Isherwood (commander of Operation Benedict, an RAF fighter wing that defended Murmansk in late 1941)
- Konstantin Rokossovsky (World War II Marshal of the Soviet Union, awarded 7 times)
- Anthony Rook (fighter pilot of the Royal Air Force)
- Arnold Rüütel (Estonian communist leader, later president of the independent Estonia)
- Anatoly Sagalevich (underwater explorer, creator of the MIR DSV)
- Aleksandr Senatorov (Soviet lieutenant-general in the air force)
- Dmitri Shostakovich (Soviet composer, awarded three times)
- Mikhail Shumayev (nuclear physicist, engineer and chemist)
- Ivan Sidorenko (Soviet sniper in World War II)
- Sergey Spasokukotsky (surgeon and member of the Soviet Academy of Sciences, 1870–1943)
- Nikolai Sutyagin (fighter pilot in World War II and Korean War)
- Max Taitz (scientist in aerodynamics, theory of jet engines and flight testing of aircraft, one of the founders of the Gromov Flight Research Institute, recipient of the Stalin Prize (1949 and 1953), Honoured Scientist of the RSFSR, awarded twice)
- Valentina Tereshkova (Cosmonaut, first woman in space, awarded twice)
- Semyon Timoshenko (World War II general, awarded 5 times)
- Josip Broz Tito (President of Yugoslavia 1945–1980)
- Gherman Titov (Cosmonaut, awarded twice)
- Vladislav Tretiak (Soviet ice hockey goaltender)
- Aleksandr Vasilevsky (Soviet marshal, awarded 8 times)
- Alina Vedmid (Ukrainian politician and agronomist)
- Pyotr Vershigora (Soviet major general and writer, Soviet partisan leader during World War II)
- Phạm Tuân (Vietnamese cosmonaut)
- Vladislav Volkov (Cosmonaut)
- Lev Yashin (Soviet football goalkeeper)
- Vasily Zaitsev (Soviet sniper during the Battle of Stalingrad, awarded 4 times)
- Yakov Zeldovich (Soviet physicist)
- Georgy Zhukov (Marshal of the Soviet Union)
- Lyudmila Zykina (folk singer)
- Michał Rola-Żymierski (Marshal of Poland)
- Liya Shakirova (Soviet linguist)
- Joseph Stalin (1949)
- Khalimakhon Suleymanova (Tajik cotton farmer, awarded twice)
- Anatoly Karpov (World Chess Champion)
- Sergei Krikalev (Cosmonaut, person with most time in space)
- Vasily Blokhin (Soviet executioner; most prolific official executioner in recorded world history)
- Volodymyr Pravyk (firefighter who died in the Chernobyl disaster)
- Semyon Nomokonov (Soviet sniper of Buryat descent)
- Dora Lazurkina (Old Bolshevik, Soviet Politician)
- Clara Zetkin (member of the Communist Part of Germany and women's rights activist.)
- Anatoly Solovyev (Soviet cosmonaut and pilot)
- Leonid Telyatnikov (Chief of the Chernobyl Nuclear Power Plant Fire Brigade, first responder to the Chernobyl disaster. Died of cancer in 2004)
- Viktor Kibenok (Chief of the Pripyat Fire Department, first responder to the Chernobyl explosion. Died of radiation sickness on 11 May 1986)
- Faina Kotkova (Soviet weaver)
- Ho Chi Minh (Vietnamese president and revolutionary)
- Garegin Apresov (Soviet diplomat and intelligence officer)
- Charilaos Florakis (General Secretary of the Communist Party of Greece)
- Ekaterina Verzilina (Russian head of a farm leader)
- Maksim Ovodenko (Russian metallurgist)

== Fictional recipients ==
- In Ian Fleming's 1956 James Bond novel From Russia, With Love, Colonel Rosa Klebb was awarded the order once and Colonel General Grubozaboyschihov was awarded it twice.
- In the 1985 James Bond film A View to a Kill, Bond is awarded the Order of Lenin by General Anatoli Gogol for defeating Max Zorin, and is described as the first foreign recipient; the real first foreign recipients had received the Order before WWII.
- In IPC Publication's Battle Picture Weekly story "Johnny Red", the titular character is awarded the Order of Lenin for saving the life of a political commissar from a German air ace.
- In the 1990 film adaption of Tom Clancy's first novel, The Hunt for Red October, following an order to surrender by a US Navy ship, Captain Ramius (Sean Connery) of Red October tells Dr. Petrov, the Chief Medical Officer (Tim Curry), "you will go with the crew; the officers and I will submerge beneath you and scuttle the ship." Dr. Petrov responds "You will receive the Order of Lenin for this, Captain."
- In the 2004 video game Metal Gear Solid 3: Snake Eater, weapons designer Alexander Leonovitch Granin received the Order of Lenin for his inventions.
- In the 2008 movie Indiana Jones and the Kingdom of the Crystal Skull, Jones's adversary Col. Irina Spalko was awarded the Order of Lenin three times.
- In the 2010 video game Singularity, Viktor Barisov is awarded the Order of Lenin for his work on the fictional element E99.
- In the Person of Interest 2013 episode "Razgovor", Genrika Zherova, a Russian immigrant in New York, keeps an Order of Lenin earned by her grandfather for his services in the KGB.
- In a satirical political advertisement by The Lincoln Project, Fox News host Tucker Carlson was anachronistically awarded the Order of Lenin for supporting Russia in its 2022 invasion of Ukraine.

== See also ==
- Awards and decorations of the Soviet Union
- Awards and decorations of the Russian Federation
- Order of Georgi Dimitrov
- Order of Karl Marx
- Order of Kim Il Sung
- Order of Red Banner
- Order of Sukhbaatar
