= Kurt Kieß =

German politician (1914–1970)

First Secretary of the Socialist Unity Party at SDAG Wismut
- In office 24 March 1960 – 30 December 1970
- Second Secretary: Günter Eichmann; Alfred Rohde
- Preceded by: Rolf Weihs
- Succeeded by: Alfred Rohde
Volkskammer
Member of the Volkskammer for Aue, Stollberg
In office 13 November 1963 – 30 December 1970
Preceded by	multi-member district
Succeeded by	Willy Hallbauer

Personal details
- Born: Kurt Kieß; 28 May 1914 Griesbach, Kingdom of Saxony, German Empire (now Saxony, Germany)
- Died: 30 December 1970 (aged 56) Karl-Marx-Stadt, Bezirk Karl-Marx-Stadt, East Germany
- Party: Socialist Unity Party (1948–1970)
- Other political affiliations: Communist Party of Germany (1932–1948)
- Education: Gebietsparteischule der SDAG Wismut; "Karl Marx" Party Academy
- Occupation: Politician; Party Functionary; Tinsmith
- Awards: Patriotic Order of Merit, 2nd class; Order of Lenin
- Central institution membership: 1967–1970: Candidate member, Central Committee; Other offices held: 1958–1960: Second Secretary, Socialist Unity Party at SDAG Wismut; 1953–1957: First Secretary, Socialist Unity Party at Wismut-Oberschlema; 1952–1953: First Secretary, Socialist Unity Party at Wismut-Breitenbrunn

Kurt Kieß (28 May 1914 – 30 December 1970) was a German politician and party functionary of the Socialist Unity Party (SED).

Until his sudden death in 1970, he served as the longtime First Secretary of the SED at SDAG Wismut since the 1960s and was a candidate member of the Central Committee of the SED. As First Secretary, he was a powerful leader in the GDR's most important mining company, the fourth largest uranium producer in the world.

== Life and career ==
=== Early life ===
Kieß was born on 28 May 1914, as the son of a locksmith, who later also became a KPD member, in Griesbach (now a part of Schneeberg) in the Ore Mountains.

After elementary school, he completed an apprenticeship as a tinsmith from 1928 to 1931. During his apprenticeship, he joined the Young Communist League of Germany, where he was at times a board member of the local Lauter group.

After finishing his apprenticeship, Kieß initially became unemployed, but from 1932 he resumed work in various jobs as a tinsmith, machinist, and punch press operator. At the age of 18 in 1932, he became a member of the Communist Party of Germany (KPD).

=== Military service and Soviet captivity ===
In October 1936, he was among the first conscripts to serve his regular two-year military service in the Wehrmacht.

After his discharge in October 1938, Kieß worked again as a punch press operator in Aue until he was recalled for military service in August 1939. He survived World War II until May 1945 without any significant known injuries; after the war, Kieß, as a senior Oberfeldwebel in the Wehrmacht, was taken as a prisoner of war by the Soviets.

He spent most of his captivity in Camp 7323/10 in Tula, where he soon worked as a tinsmith and eventually rose to the positions of brigadier and best worker. As a KPD member, he joined the camp's antifascist committee and became a propagandist. Later, he completed a one-year course at an anti-fascist school.

In June 1948, Kieß was released from captivity and returned to the Soviet occupation zone in Germany. After a brief illness, he began working as a tinsmith in Bernsbach in July 1948. His KPD membership was transferred to the ruling Socialist Unity Party (SED).

=== SDAG Wismut SED ===
In August 1949, Kieß started working at Wismut AG as a mining machinist in the Oberschlema uranium mine until March 1951. Following a reorganization of the party organs within Wismut, he was assigned as cadre instructor of the local party leadership at the Object 11 mining site in Oberschlema until June 1951. He was then appointed as the Second Secretary of this local party leadership until June 1952.

Until December 1953, he served as the First Secretary of the SED at the Wismut-Breitenbrunn mining site, followed by the Wismut-Oberschlema until April 1957. Since 1954, he was part of the bureau of the central SDAG Wismut SED leadership.

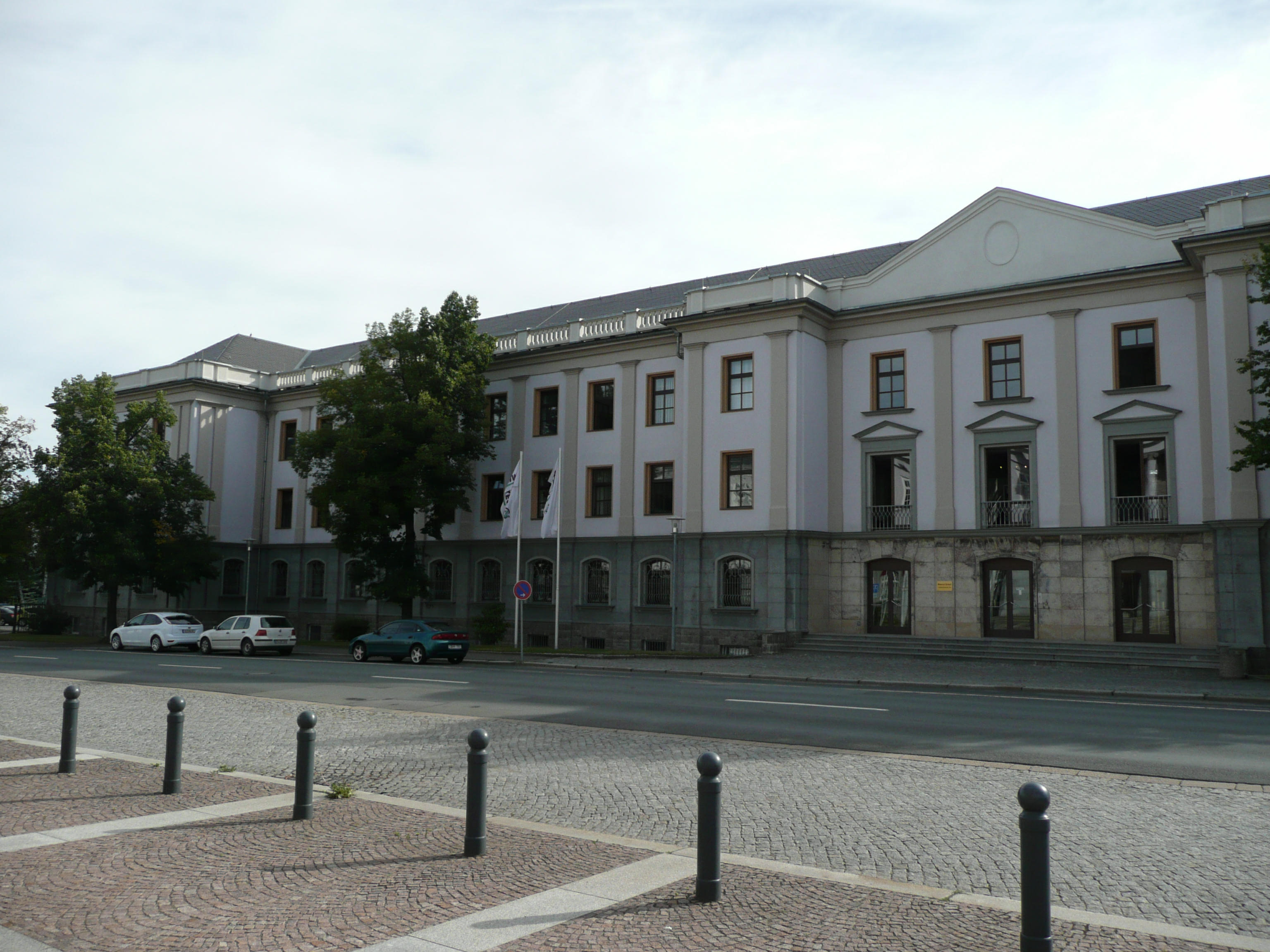
Former SDAG Wismut SED building in Chemnitz in August 2008

In April 1957, Kieß moved to the central SDAG Wismut SED leadership in Siegmar-Schönau, where he served as acting secretary for economic affairs until August. He then attended a one-year course at the SED's "Karl Marx" Party Academy in Berlin despite already being 43 years old. He returned as Second Secretary of the SDAG Wismut SED, succeeding Rolf Weihs, who was promoted to First Secretary, in August 1958.

The SDAG Wismut SED party organization, titled territorial party leadership (German: Gebietsparteileitung), held the rank of a Bezirk party organization, unlike all other industrial party organizations, as SDAG Wismut was a massive mining undertaking with dozens of locations. It was described as a "state within a state".

When Weihs was appointed First Secretary of the Bezirk Karl-Marx-Stadt SED in March 1960, Kieß succeeded him. He additionally became a member of the Volkskammer in November 1963, nominally representing a constituency in the Ore Mountains in Bezirk Karl-Marx-Stadt, and a candidate member of the Central Committee of the SED in April 1967 (VII. Party Congress).

Kieß was awarded the Patriotic Order of Merit in silver in 1964 and the Order of Lenin in 1966.

=== Death ===
He died unexpectedly on 30 December 1970, at the age of 56.
