= Faina Kotkova =

Russian weaver and labour leader (1933–2020)

Faina Vasilyevna Kotkova (Russian: Фаина Васильевна Коткова; 6 April 1933, Vyazniki – 4 June 2020, Vyazniki) was a Soviet and Russian weaver and labour leader. She was invested with the Order of the Badge of Honour in 1966, the Order of the October Revolution in 1971, the Order of the Red Banner of Labour in 1974, and the Order of Lenin in 1980 by the Soviet Union.
