= Alfred Rohde =

German politician (1921–1990)

First Secretary of the Socialist Unity Party at SDAG Wismut
- In office 5 February 1971 – 12 November 1989
- Second Secretary: Heinz Freitag
- Preceded by: Kurt Kieß
- Succeeded by: Heinz Freitag
Volkskammer
Member of the Volkskammer for Aue, Stollberg
In office 26 November 1971 – 16 November 1989
Preceded by	Wolfgang Rauchfuß
Succeeded by	Jochen Thiele

Personal details
- Born: Alfred Rohde; 21 April 1921 Dresden, Free State of Saxony, Weimar Republic (now Germany)
- Died: 30 January 1990 (aged 68)
- Party: SED-PDS (1989–1990)
- Other political affiliations: Socialist Unity Party (1946–1989); Social Democratic Party (1945–1946)
- Education: Landesparteischule „Ernst Thälmann“; "Karl Marx" Party Academy (Dipl.-Ges.-Wiss.)
- Occupation: Politician; Party Functionary; Machinist
- Awards: Medal of Merit of the GDR; Patriotic Order of Merit, 1st class; Order of Karl Marx; Banner of Labor; Order of Lenin
- Central institution membership: 1971–1989: Full member, Central Committee; Other offices held: 1966–1971: Second Secretary, Socialist Unity Party at SDAG Wismut

Alfred Rohde (21 April 1921 – 30 January 1990) was a German politician and party functionary of the Socialist Unity Party (SED).

In the German Democratic Republic, he served as the longtime First Secretary of the SED at SDAG Wismut and was a member of the Central Committee of the SED. As First Secretary, he was a powerful leader in the GDR's most important mining company, the fourth largest uranium producer in the world.

He committed suicide in January 1990, having lost power in the Peaceful Revolution.

== Life and career ==
=== Early career ===
Rohde was born as the son of a locksmith and a factory worker. He attended elementary and vocational school until Easter 1935. Between April 1935 and February 1939, he trained as a machinist and subsequently worked in this profession in Dresden from March 1939 to October 1940 and in Leipzig from October 1940 to March 1942.

From March 1942 to May 1945, he served in the Wehrmacht. From May to September 1945, Rohde was held as a British prisoner of war in Schleswig-Holstein. After his release, he worked again as a machinist in Dresden until December 1950.

In September 1945, he joined the SPD (Social Democratic Party of Germany) in 1945, which was forcibly merged with the KPD (Communist Party of Germany) to form the SED (Socialist Unity Party of Germany) in 1946. Additionally, he joined the FDGB (Free German Trade Union Federation) in 1946.

From 1946 to 1950, he was the chairman of the BGL (company trade union leadership) and, after attending the state party school "Ernst Thälmann" in Meißen, served as secretary of the SED party organization at VEB Universelle-Werke, a factory making machines for the production of cigarettes, from January to November 1951 and as a member of an SED city district leadership in Dresden.

From December 1951 to June 1952, he was the head of the organization and instructor department of the Dresden SED and from July 1952 to February 1953, the head of the department for party organs and mass organizations of the Dresden-Land SED.

From February 1953 to September 1955, he participated in the first three-year course at the "Karl Marx" Party Academy. He graduated with a diploma in social sciences (Dipl.-Ges.-Wiss.). From November 1955 to June 1966, he subsequently worked as an instructor in the party organs department and as a political staff member in the Central Committee of the SED.

=== SDAG Wismut SED ===
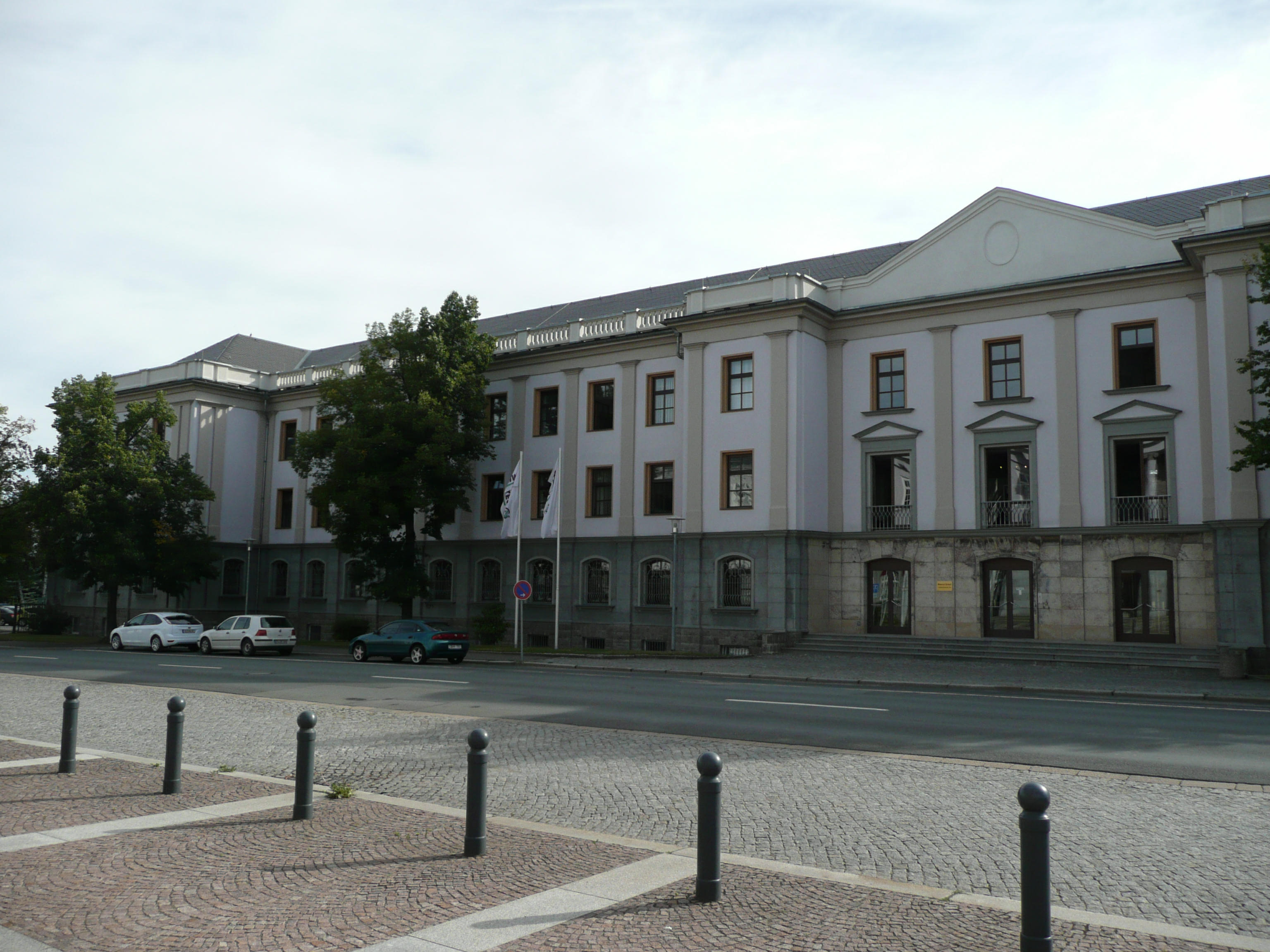
Former SDAG Wismut SED building in Chemnitz in August 2008

In 1969, Rohde was transferred to the Soviet-German joint-stock company (SDAG) Wismut SED as Second Secretary, succeeding Günter Eichmann, who left to study at the Bergakademie Freiberg.

The SDAG Wismut SED party organization, titled territorial party leadership (German: Gebietsparteileitung), held the rank of a Bezirk party organization, unlike all other industrial party organizations, as SDAG Wismut was a massive mining undertaking with dozens of locations. It was described as a "state within a state".

In December 1970, First Secretary Kurt Kieß surprisingly died at the age of 56. Rohde was elected to succeeded him in February 1971. He additionally became a full member of the Central Committee of the SED in June (VIII. Party Congress), serving until its collective resignation in December 1989, and of the Volkskammer in November, nominally representing a constituency in the Ore Mountains in Bezirk Karl-Marx-Stadt.

Rohde was awarded the Patriotic Order of Merit in bronze in 1968, in silver and in Gold in 1986, the Order of Karl Marx in 1981, the Banner of Labor in 1984 and the Order of Lenin.

=== Peaceful Revolution and death ===
During the Wende, on 12 November 1989, the SDAG Wismut SED removed him from the position of First Secretary and installed his longtime deputy Heinz Freitag as his successor. Freitag led the party organization until its dissolution in December. He was removed by his party from the Volkskammer a week later, on 16 November 1989.

Rohde committed suicide on 30 January 1990.
