= Beilinson =

Beilinson is a surname. Notable people with the surname include:

- Alexander Beilinson (born 1957), Russian-American mathematician
- Eduardo "Skay" Beilinson (born 1952), Argentine guitarist
- Les Beilinson (1946–2013), American architect and preservationist
- Yakov Lvovich Beilinson (1906–1950), Russian naval executive

== See also ==
- The Beilinson Campus of the Rabin Medical Center, named after Moshe Beilinson
