= Barysaw =

City in Minsk Region, Belarus

Barysaw Барысаў • Борисов Borisov
- City
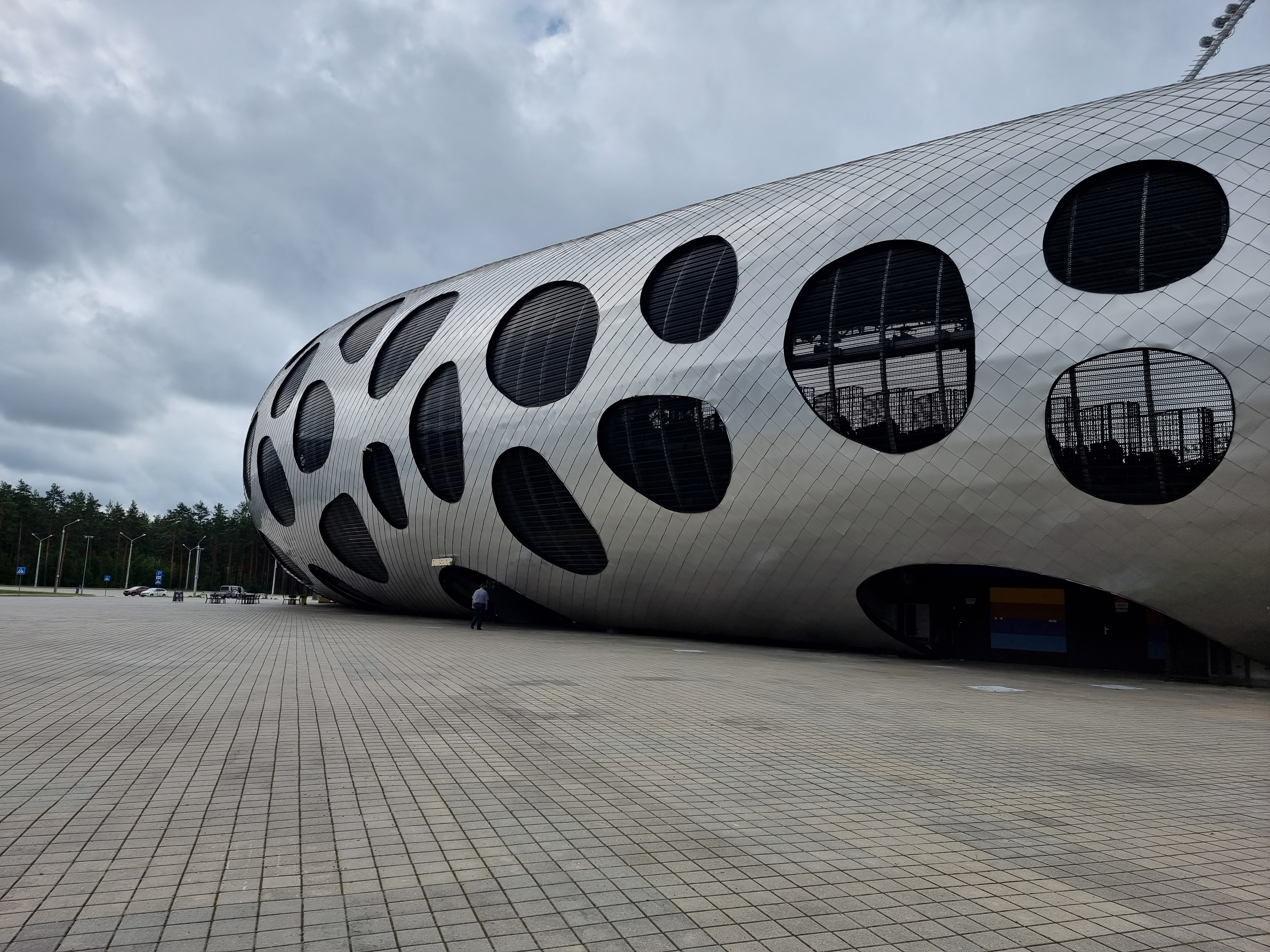
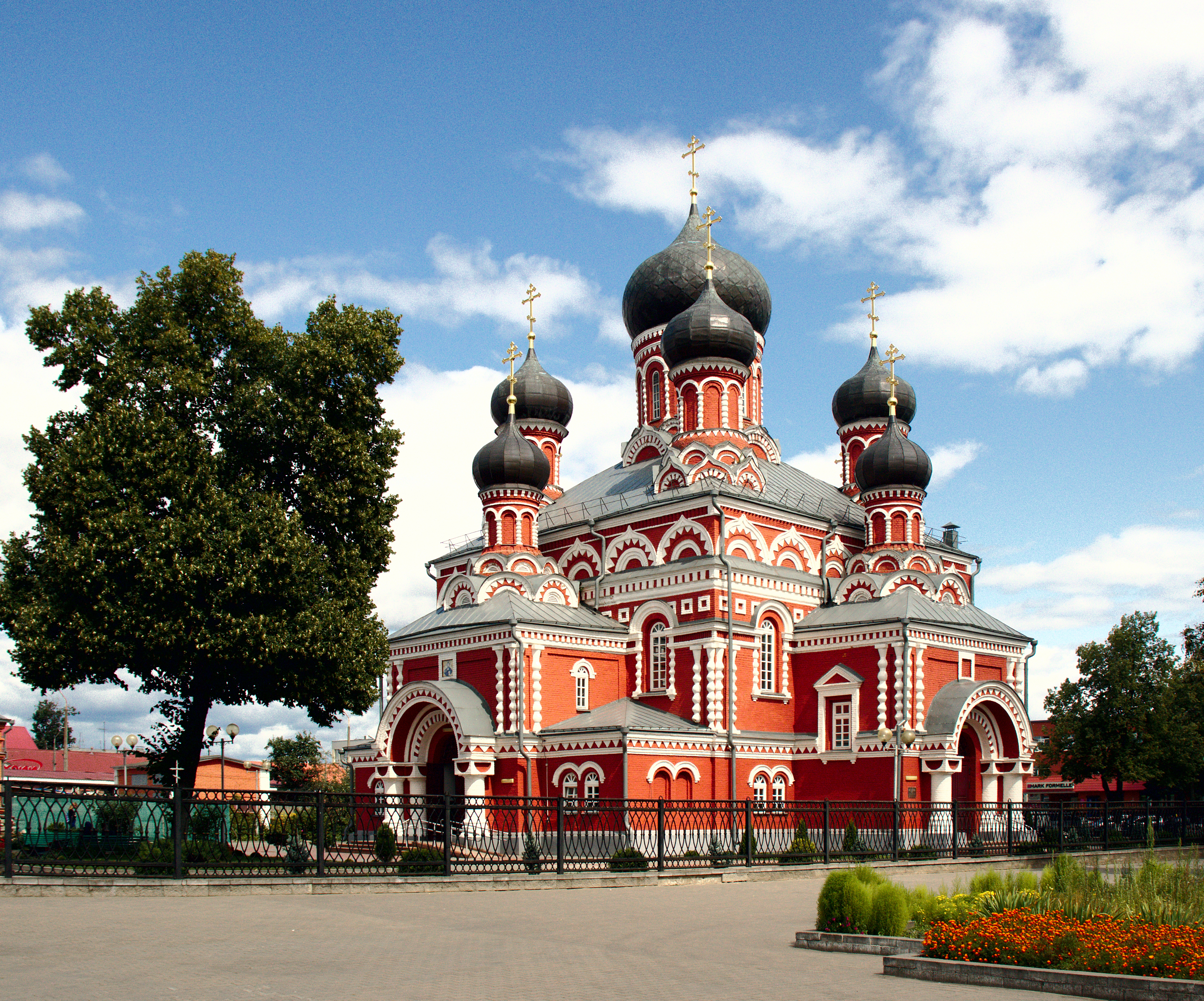
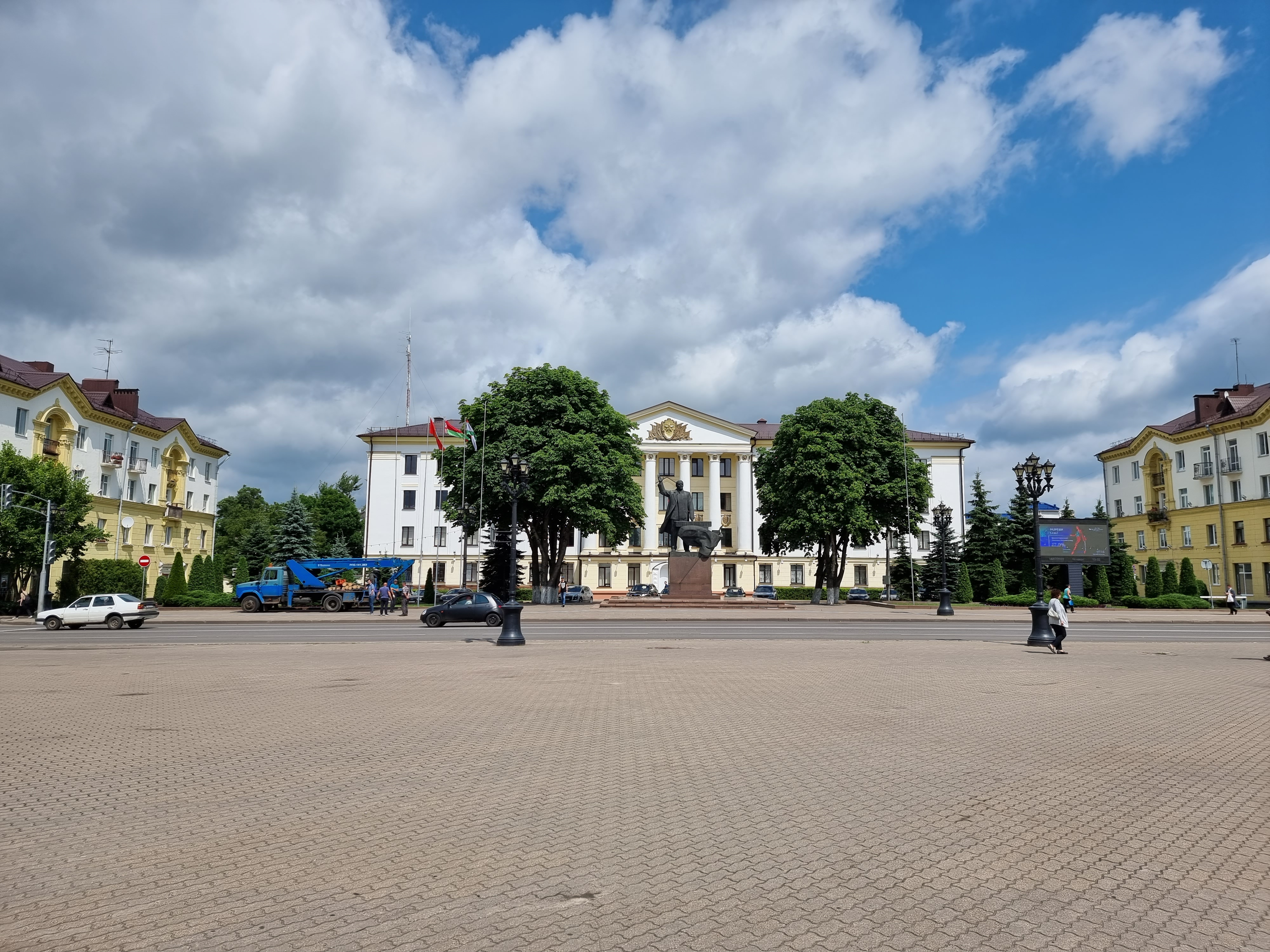
- Borisov Arena Resurrection Cathedral Main square and City Hall

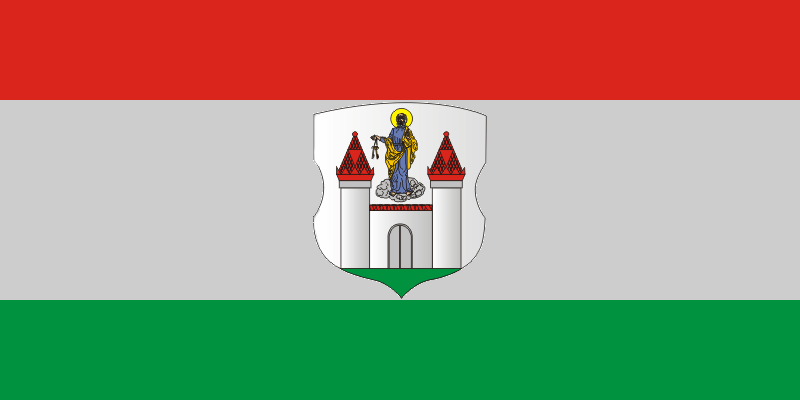
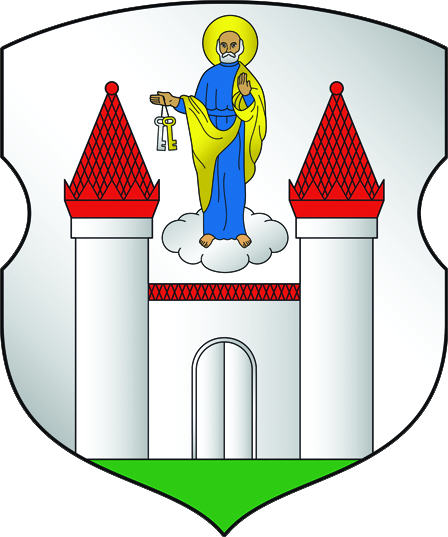
- Flag Coat of arms

- Location within Belarus
- Coordinates: 54°14′N 28°30′E
- Country: Belarus
- Region: Minsk Region
- District: Barysaw District
- Founded: 1102

Area
  - Total: 45.97 km^{2} (17.75 sq mi)
- Elevation: 169 m (554 ft)

Population (2026)
  - Total: 133,700
  - Density: 2,908/km^{2} (7,533/sq mi)
- Time zone: UTC+3 (MSK)
- Postal code: 222xxx
- Area code: +375 01777
- License plate: 5
- Website: Official website

Barysaw, or Borisov, (Note: Belarusian: Бары́саў, romanized: Barysaŭ, IPA: [baˈrɨsaw]; Russian: Бори́сов, IPA: [bɐˈrʲisəf]; Polish: Borysów; Yiddish: באַריסעוו.) is a city in Minsk Region, in central Belarus. It serves as the administrative center of Barysaw District. It is located on the Berezina River and 74 kilometres (46 mi) north-east from the capital Minsk. As of 2026, it has a population of 133,700.

== Etymology ==
The name Barysaw is the Belarusian equivalent to the Russian name Borisov. It may be an eponym derived from the given name Boris, possibly named after the 12th-century prince, Boris Vseslavich.

== History ==
=== Early history ===
Barysaw is first mentioned in the Laurentian Codex as being founded (as Borisov) in 1102 by Rogvolod Vseslavich, the prince of Polotsk, who had the baptismal name of Boris. During the next two centuries, it was burned and then rebuilt south of where it was before.

=== Under Lithuania ===
From the late 13th century to 1795, the town was part of the Grand Duchy of Lithuania, which was part of the Polish-Lithuanian union since the Union of Krewo (1385) and the Polish–Lithuanian Commonwealth after the Union of Lublin (1569).

In 1500, during the Lithuanian–Muscovite War, Alexander Jagiellon resided in Barysaw Castle. In 1563, it was granted Magdeburg town rights by King Sigismund II Augustus.

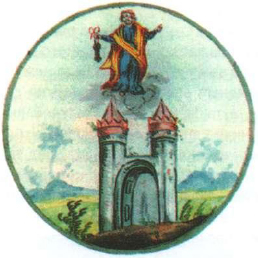
Coat of arms in 1792

In the last years of the Polish-Lithuanian Commonwealth, troops were stationed here, including the 2nd and 4th Lithuanian Vanguard Regiments and 1st Lithuanian Infantry Regiment. King Stanisław August Poniatowski established the town's coat of arms (decree #17435), the top half containing the coat of arms of Minsk, while the lower half had two stylized towers on a silver background with a passage between them and Saint Peter above the towers holding a key in his hand.

Barysaw became part of the Russian Empire in 1793 as a result of the Second Partition of Poland.

=== 19th century ===
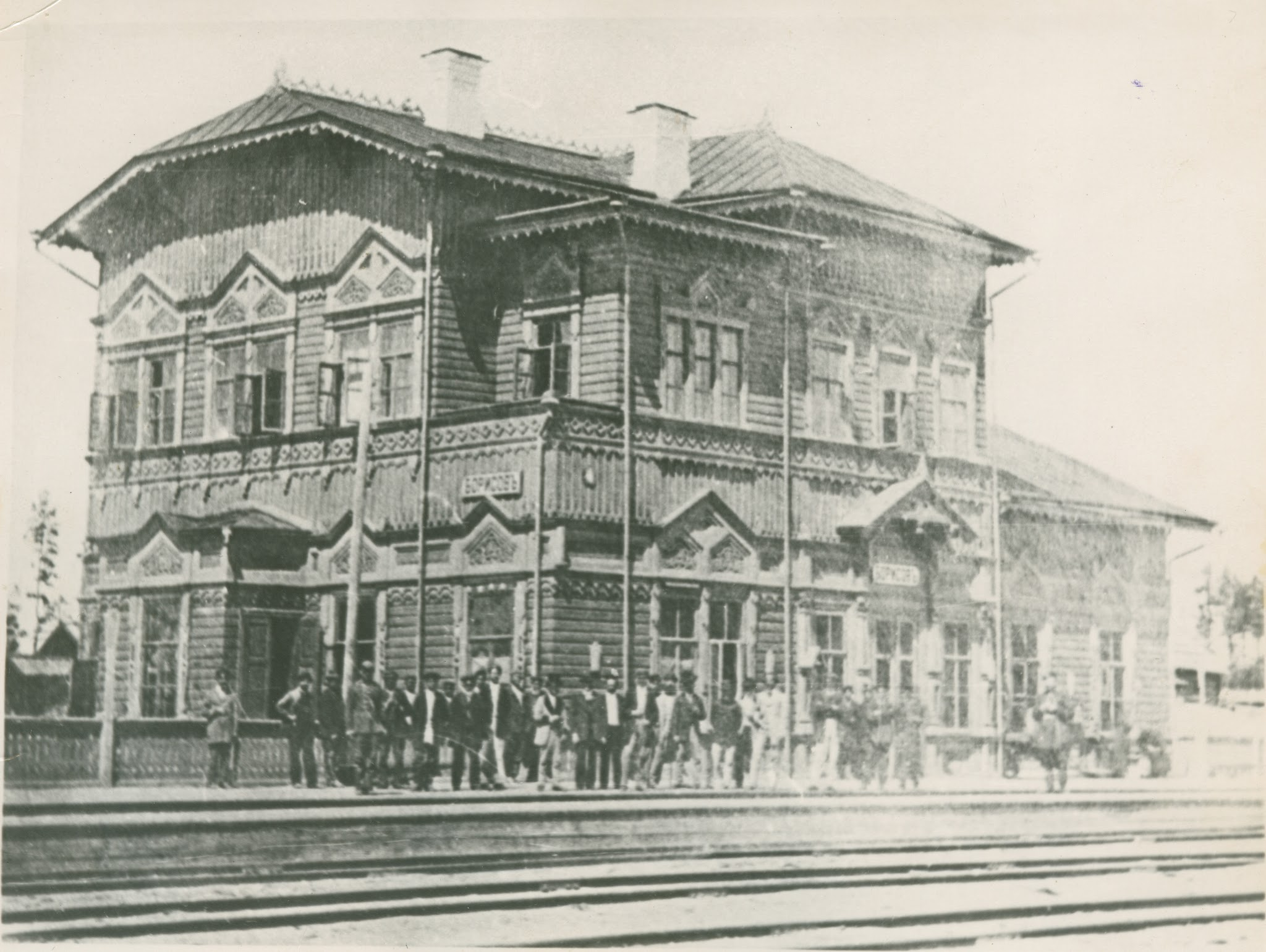
Railway station in the 19th century

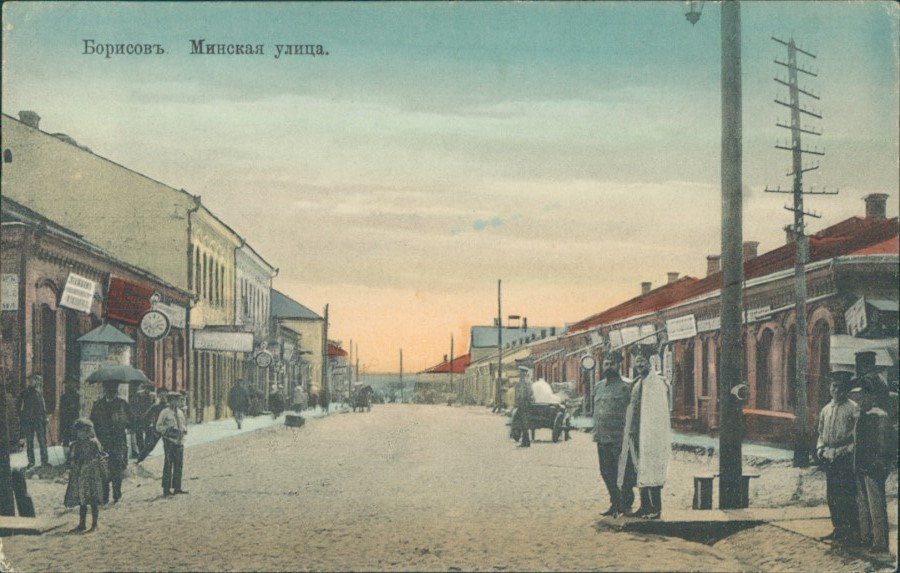
Barysaw in the early 20th century

After the Partitions of Poland, Barysaw was an uyezd (district) town in the Minsk Governorate.

In 1812, Barysaw became a crucial location when Napoleon's troops crossed the Berezina river. The French feinted a crossing at the town itself, but successfully escaped the pursuing armies by building two wooden bridges north of the city, at Studianka. This event is reenacted by military locals during town festivals. A cannon from the Napoleonic era is kept by the town's museum.

In 1871, the railway between Brest and Moscow passed near Barysaw, and a station was built there. In 1900 the area around the station was annexed the town.

=== 20th century ===
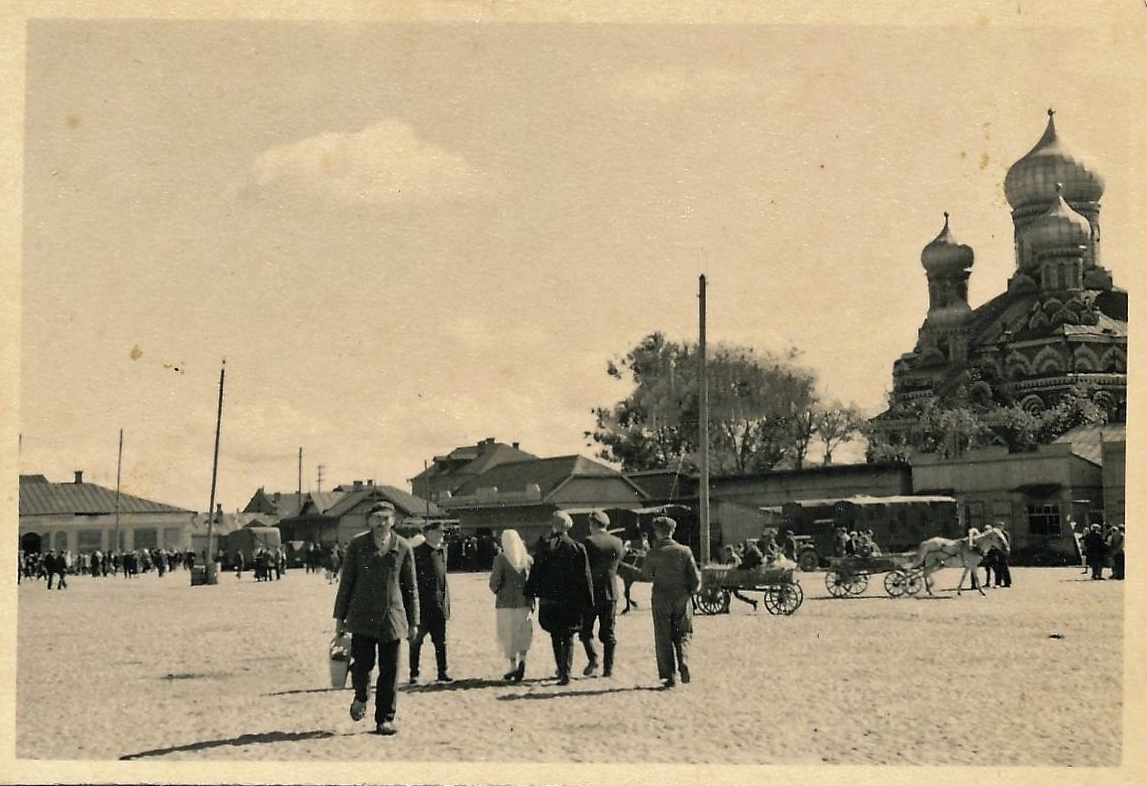
Barysaw ca. 1941-1944

During World War I and the Russian Revolution, fights broke out for control of the city and it changed owners several times. In November 1917, the area became a part of Soviet Russia, but from early 1918, it was occupied by Germany before falling to the Soviets again in December 1918. From 1919 to 1920, it was controlled by Poland, before being captured by the Soviets for the third time.

Soviet rule was recognized by the Peace of Riga in 1921 and the city was included in the Byelorussian Soviet Socialist Republic.

The headquarters of the Soviet 10th Army was based in Barysaw shortly before the Soviet invasion of Poland shortly after the start of World War II in September 1939. The 10th Army invaded towards Nowogródek and Białystok. During World War II, Barysaw was occupied by Nazi Germany from 2 July 1941 to 1 July 1944, and most of the city was destroyed. The Germans also operated the Dulag 126, Dulag 184, Dulag 240 and Stalag VI-H prisoner-of-war camps in the city.

Since May 1948 the city has been home to the headquarters of the 7th Tank Army, which became the 65th Army Corps and then the North Western Operational Command of the Armed Forces of Belarus in 2001. In 2000s the Head of City Administration, or Mayor, was Vassily Burgun.

Historic architecture of Barysaw (examples)

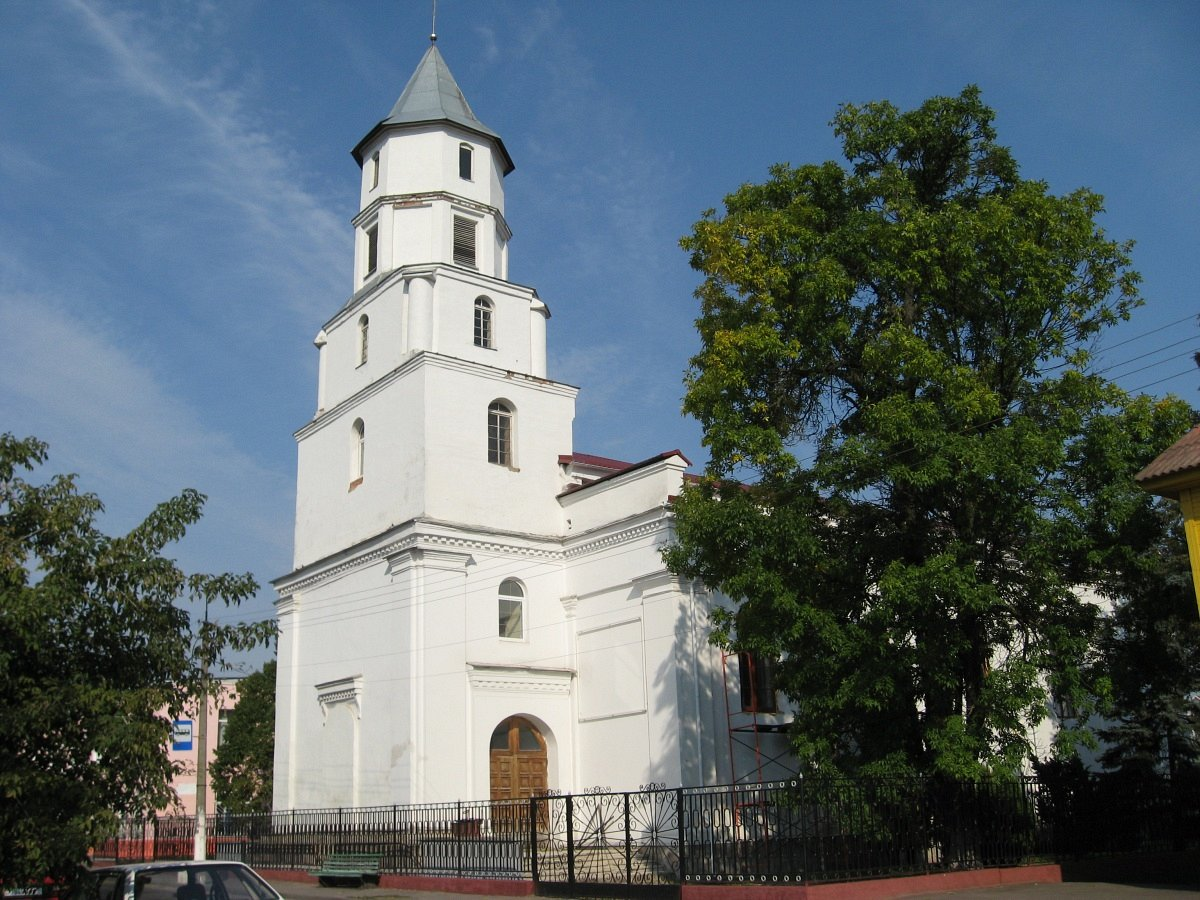
Catholic Church of the Nativity of the Virgin Mary

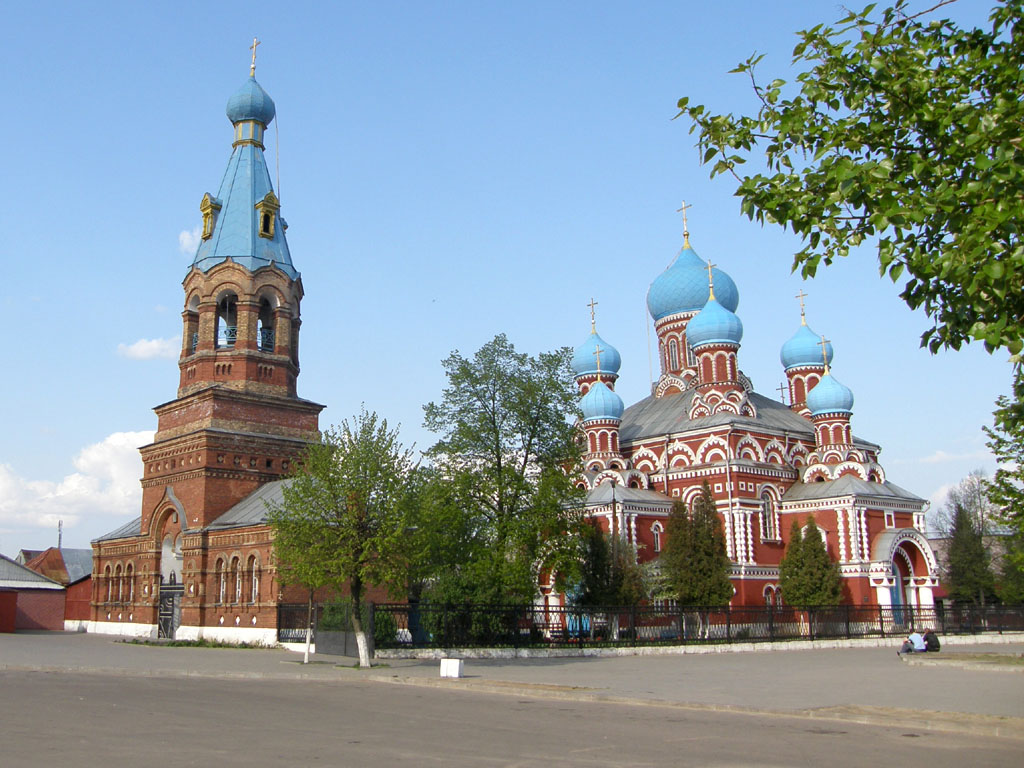
Orthodox Church of the Resurrection of Christ

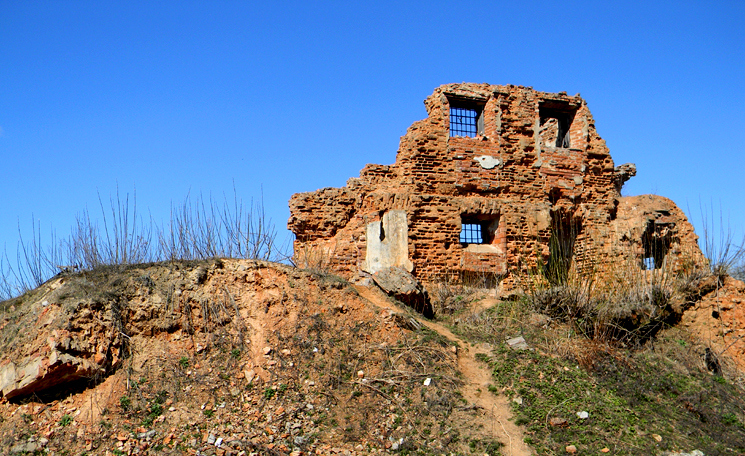
Castle ruins

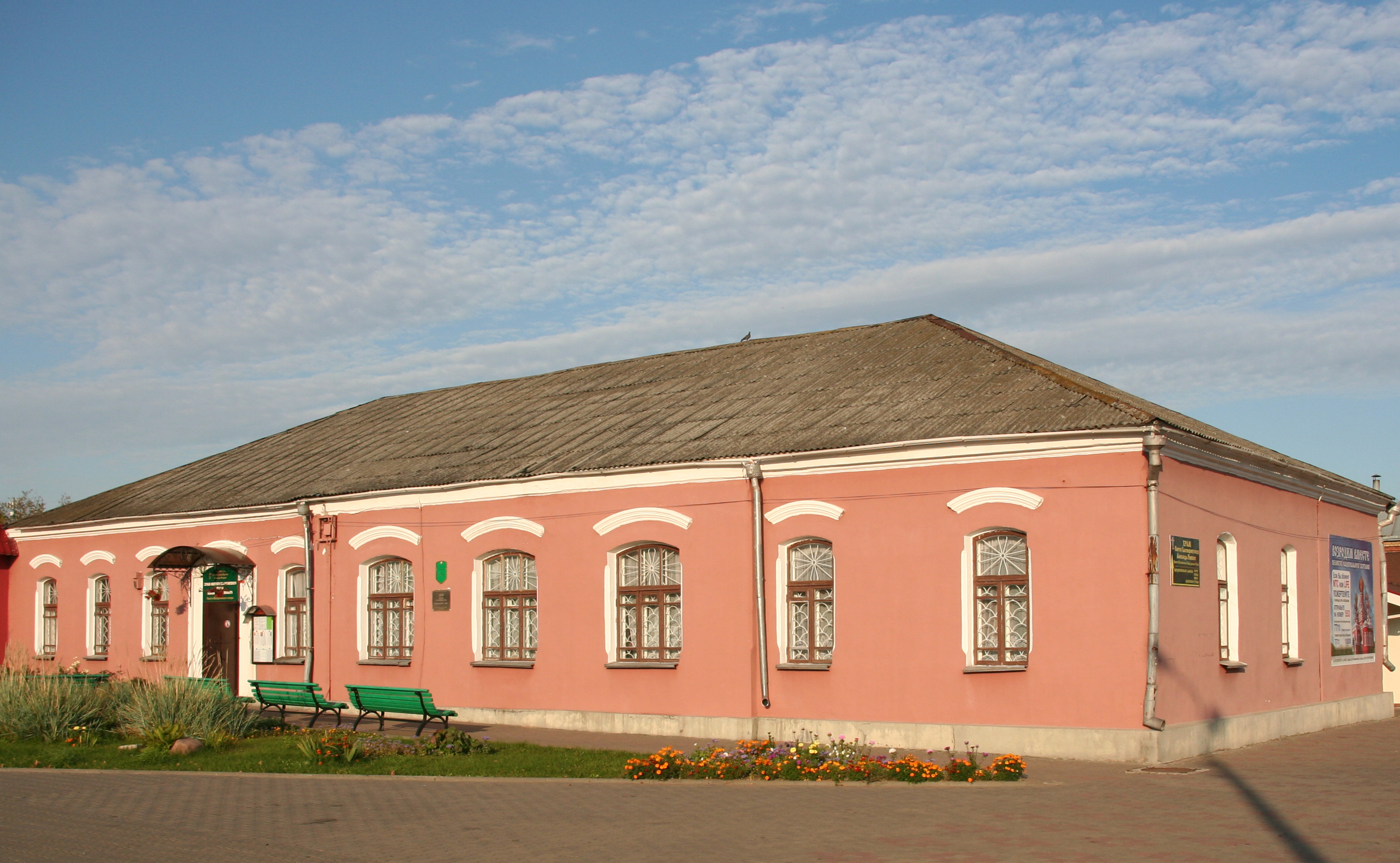
Former treasury building

== Climate ==
Barysaw has a humid continental climate (Köppen: Dfb), with cold winters and warm summers.

Climate data for Barysaw (1991–2020)
Month	Jan	Feb	Mar	Apr	May	Jun	Jul	Aug	Sep	Oct	Nov	Dec	Year
Record high °C (°F)	4.1 (39.4)	5.5 (41.9)	12.6 (54.7)	22.6 (72.7)	27.4 (81.3)	29.9 (85.8)	31.2 (88.2)	30.7 (87.3)	25.7 (78.3)	18.9 (66.0)	10.8 (51.4)	5.6 (42.1)	31.2 (88.2)
Mean daily maximum °C (°F)	−2.2 (28.0)	−1.0 (30.2)	4.5 (40.1)	12.9 (55.2)	19.0 (66.2)	22.6 (72.7)	24.5 (76.1)	23.6 (74.5)	17.6 (63.7)	10.2 (50.4)	3.3 (37.9)	−0.9 (30.4)	11.2 (52.2)
Daily mean °C (°F)	−4.5 (23.9)	−4.0 (24.8)	0.4 (32.7)	7.4 (45.3)	13.2 (55.8)	16.9 (62.4)	18.8 (65.8)	17.8 (64.0)	12.4 (54.3)	6.4 (43.5)	1.1 (34.0)	−2.8 (27.0)	6.9 (44.4)
Mean daily minimum °C (°F)	−6.8 (19.8)	−6.6 (20.1)	−3.0 (26.6)	2.6 (36.7)	7.8 (46.0)	11.6 (52.9)	13.7 (56.7)	12.7 (54.9)	8.1 (46.6)	3.4 (38.1)	−0.9 (30.4)	−4.8 (23.4)	3.1 (37.6)
Record low °C (°F)	−20.3 (−4.5)	−18.3 (−0.9)	−12.0 (10.4)	−4.0 (24.8)	0.3 (32.5)	5.2 (41.4)	8.8 (47.8)	6.6 (43.9)	1.1 (34.0)	−4.5 (23.9)	−9.9 (14.2)	−14.9 (5.2)	−20.3 (−4.5)
Average precipitation mm (inches)	42.1 (1.66)	40.0 (1.57)	41.0 (1.61)	41.6 (1.64)	63.0 (2.48)	78.0 (3.07)	94.0 (3.70)	75.2 (2.96)	58.3 (2.30)	54.6 (2.15)	47.6 (1.87)	41.0 (1.61)	676.4 (26.63)
Average precipitation days (≥ 1.0 mm)	10.9	10.0	9.2	7.5	9.8	10.0	10.9	8.9	8.0	10.2	9.7	10.7	115.8
Source: NOAA

== Industry ==
After World War II, Barysaw became a major industrial centre; as of 2002 there are 41 large factories exporting their goods to Russia, the CIS, and worldwide. The railroad is still an important artery, but now it is powered by overhead electric lines.

The following industries are prominent in town: Borisov Plant of Motor-and-Tractor Electric Machinery, Borisov Plant Avtogydrousilitel, Borisov Aggregate Works, Ekran Company, Dzerzhynski Crystal Works, Borisov Plastics Plant, the 140th Repair Works, the 2566th Plant on Radioelectronics Equipment Maintenance, the Rezinotekhnika Company, Borisov Meat Packing Plant, Borisov Plant of Polymer Package Polimiz, the Belarusian-German joint venture Frebor, the Lesokhimik Company, the Metallist Company, the Paper Factory of the state emblem department under the Finance Ministry of the Republic of Belarus, the Borisovdrev Company, the Borisovkhlebprom Company, Borisov Bakery, Borisov Sewing Factory, the Shveinik Company, Kischenko Crafts Factory, Borisov Dairy, Borisov Tinned Plant, others. The total industrial staff reaches 31,019 people.

The largest factories, in no particular order, are:

- BATE (electricity automobile parts)
- AGU (avto-gidro-usilitel — power steering in Russian)
- Pharmaceutical plant (medpreparatov)
- Turbocompressors plant (agregatov)
- Match factory (Borisovdrev)
- BoriMak (factory producing pasta, spaghetti)
- Zdravushka (Dairy products)
- Rezinotechnika (Rubber factory)
- Meat processing factory
- DOC (Wood products manufactury)

== Modern living ==
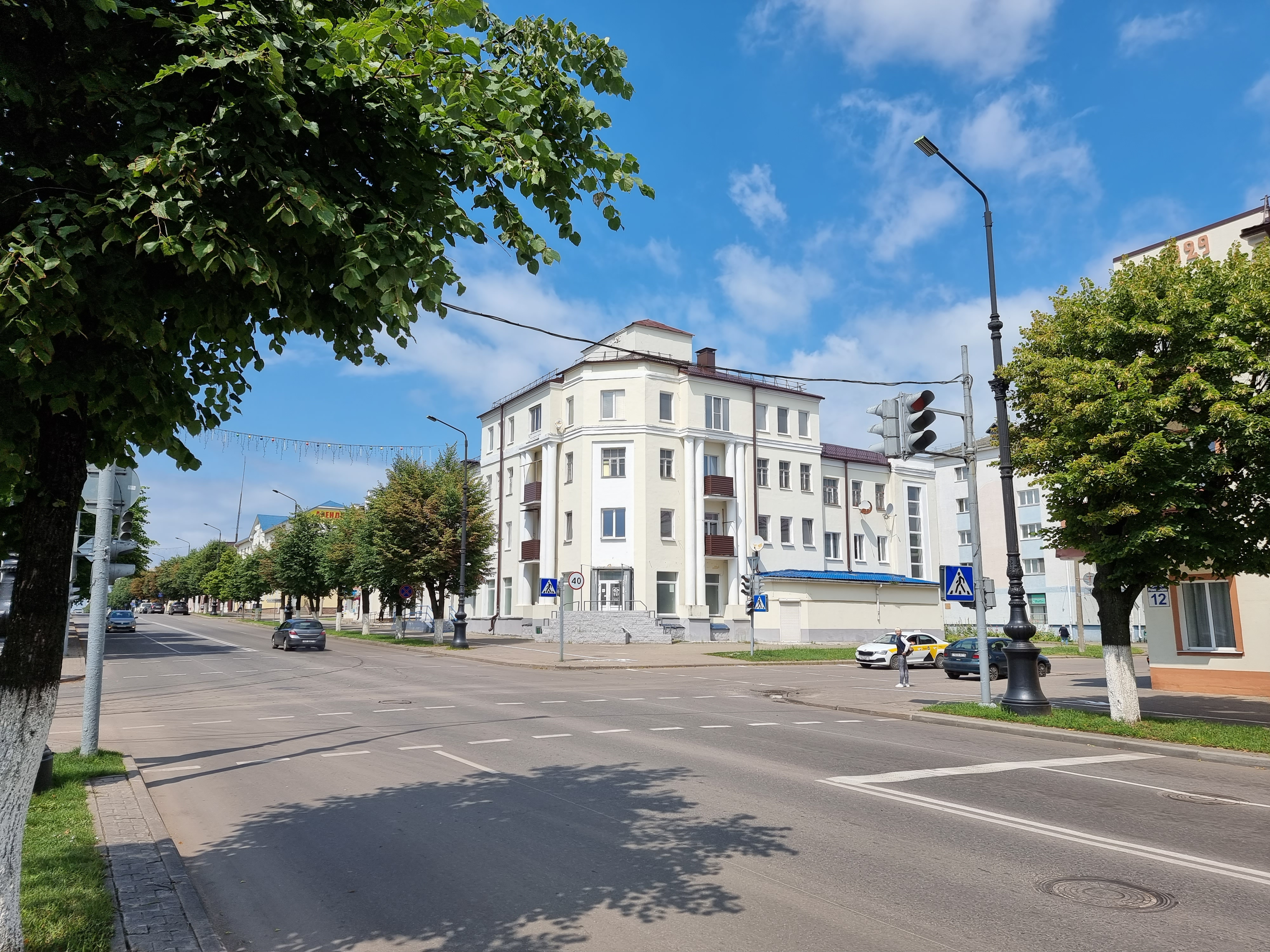
Prospect Revolutsii

The town is divided by the river into old and new parts connected by two bridges. The railway station, international road, Ispolkom (ex-KPSS Gorispolkom), military staff headquarters and the central square are in the new part. As usual for this region, families live mostly in flats in large, modern apartment buildings, but there are some single-family homes on the outskirts, some of which do not yet have indoor plumbing. The water comes from an artesian well and is very clean and healthy.

== Authorities ==
- President of the Republic of Belarus Aleksandr Lukashenko on 9 January 2009 assigned Vladimir Miranovich to the position of Head of Regional Administration.

== Sport ==
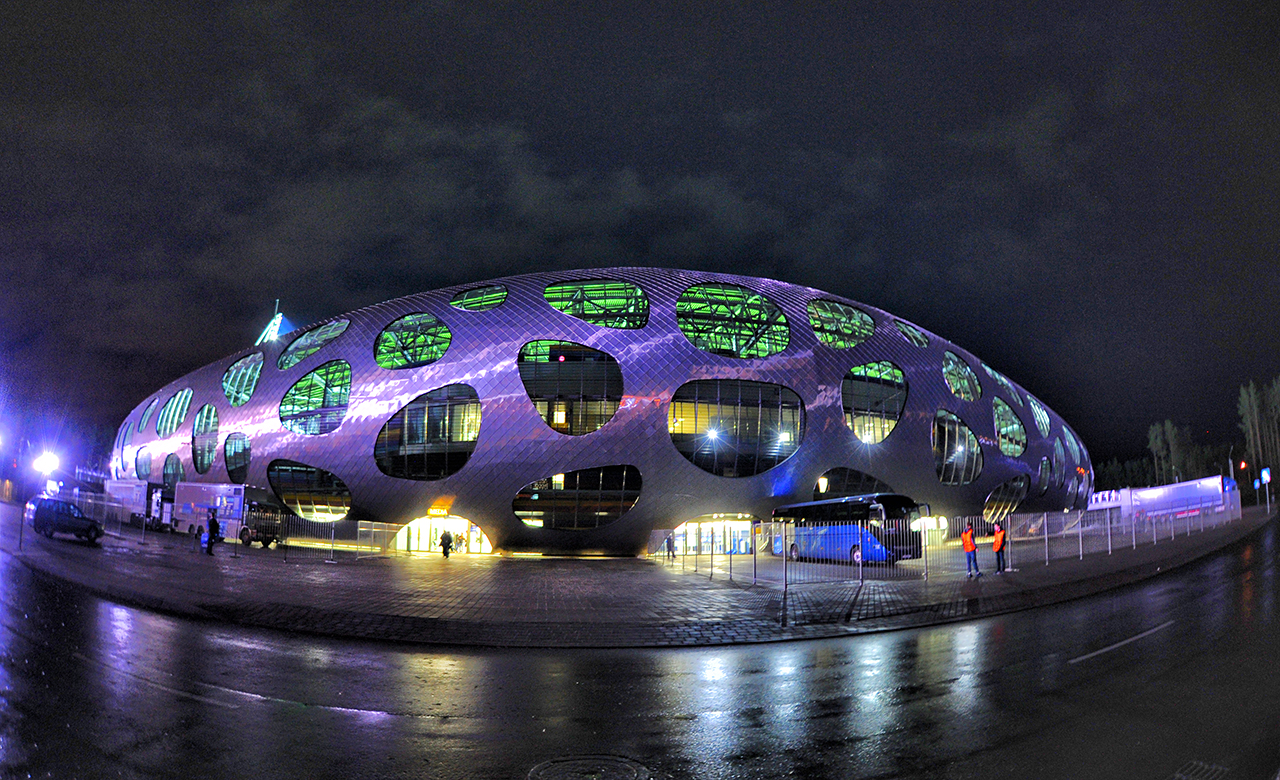
Borisov Arena

Main sport sites: 2 stadiums, 3 swimming pools, 14 shooting galleries, and 8 sports-grounds.

The city has its own football team, BATE Borisov. The team won the Belarusian Premier League 15 times, and competed in the UEFA Cup and UEFA Champions League. There is also a famous basketball team Berezina-RCOR. European basketball championship for women (division B) was organized in Barysaw.

== Media ==
- Borisovskiye Novosti newspaper: privately owned independent media on both languages. A recent scandal related to an attempt by the Mayor to stop distribution of the paper, recently overturned by a court
- Official “Adzinstva” newspaper in Belarusian.
- Local TV company "Skif"

== Notable people ==
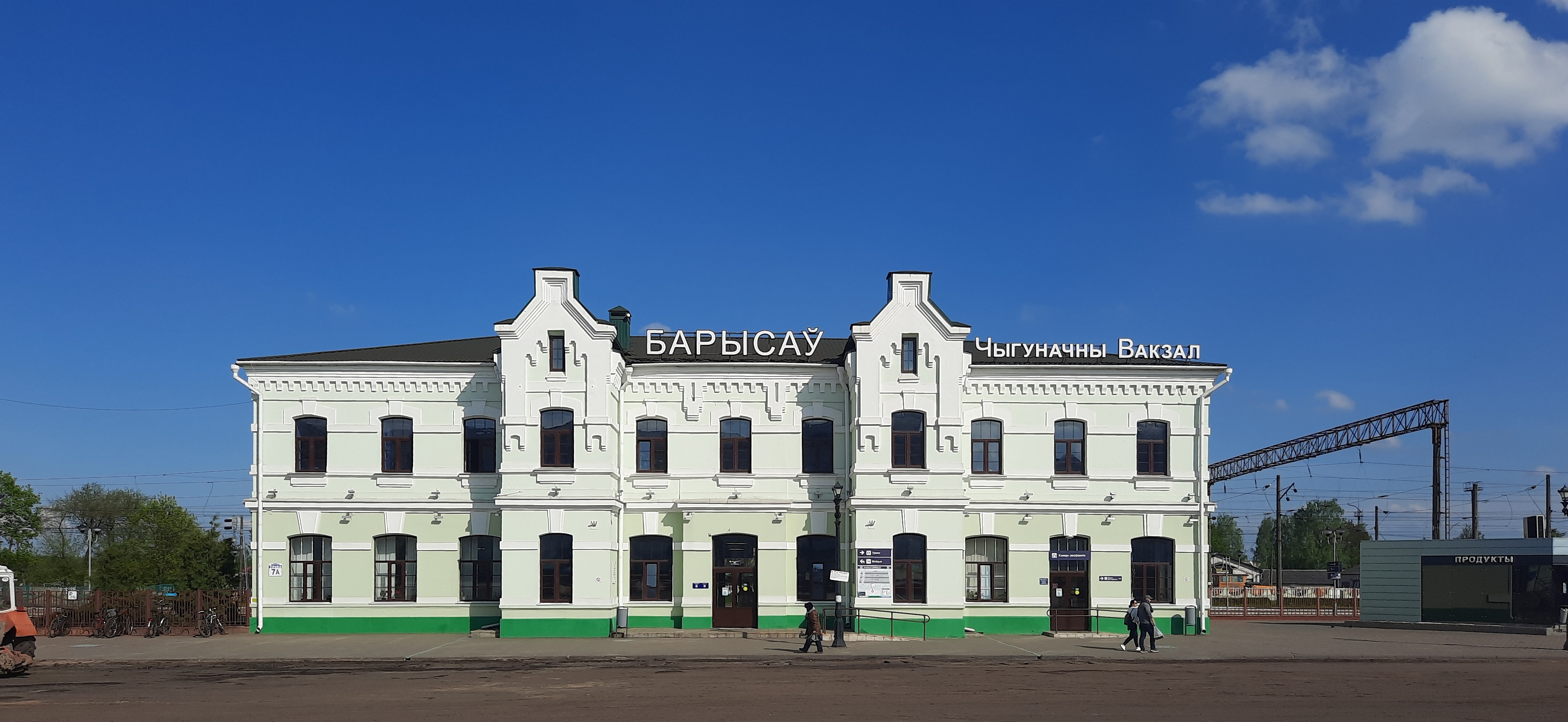
Railway station

- Iosif Adamovich (1897–1937), Belarusian politician
- Yevsei Vainrub (1909–2003), Soviet Tank Commander during World War II; Colonel and Hero of the Soviet Union
- Matvei Vainrub (1910–1998), Soviet Commander of the Tank Troops and later deputy Army Commander; Lieutenant-General and Hero of the Soviet Union
- Haim Laskov (1919–1982), the fifth Chief of Staff of the Israel Defense Forces
- Anatoly Gromyko (1932–2017), Soviet and Russian scientist and diplomat
- Anatoly Chubais (born 1955), Soviet and Russian economist
- Andrei Aramnau (born 1988), weightlifter and world record holder
- Dzmitry Baha (born 1990), footballer
- Aleksandr Pavlovets (born 1996), footballer

== International relations ==
Barysaw is twinned with:

- Kapan, Armenia
- Narva, Estonia
- Podolsk, Russia
- Pazardzhik, Bulgaria
- Maloyaroslavets, Russia
