= Verkhnemancharovo =

Verkhnemancharovo Верхнеманчарово
- Selo
- Location within Bashkortostan Location within Russia
- Coordinates: 55°22′N 54°33′E
- Country: Russia
- Region: Bashkortostan
- District: Ilishevsky District
- Time zone: UTC+5:00

Verkhnemancharovo (Russian: Верхнеманчарово; Bashkir: Үрге Маншыр, Ürge Manşır) is a rural locality (a selo) in Igmetovsky Selsoviet, Ilishevsky District, Bashkortostan, Russia. In 2010, The population was 524. There are 7 streets.

== Geography ==
Verkhnemancharovo is located 23 km southeast of Verkhneyarkeyevo (the district's administrative centre) by road. Igmetovo is the nearest rural locality.
