= Gertrude Boyarski =

Polish partisan fighter

Gertrude Boyarski

Gertrude Boyarski (October 1, 1922 – September 19, 2012) was a Polish partisan fighter, Holocaust survivor, and a recipient of the Order of Lenin during World War II.

== Life ==
Born October 1, 1922, Boyarski lived in the village of Derechin, Poland, (now Dzyarechyn, Belarus) which was then majority Jewish. She had a basic schooling, learning Russian and studying to become a tailor. When Germany invaded Soviet controlled territory in Operation Barbarossa, Derechin was placed under Nazi control. For almost a year, Boyarski's family lived just outside the Jewish ghettos as her father, a butcher and house painter, was useful to the Nazis. On July 24, 1942, the Nazis killed 3,000–4,000 of the Jewish townsfolk, with Boyarski's family escaping to nearby forests with other survivors. Boyarski's mother, father, brothers and sister were killed by the Nazis.

Boyarski went on to help and support partisan fighters, who fought alongside the Soviet forces in resisting the German invasion. Over the course of the war, most of her immediate family was killed by Nazis and antisemitic Poles. On March 8, 1943, Boyarski and another female partisan volunteered to destroy a bridge used by German troops. Using kerosene and straw from a nearby village, they burned the wooden bridge, receiving some small arms fire in the process. It was for this action that they each earned the Order of Lenin.

== Personal life ==
After the end of World War II in 1945, Boyarski found and married a surviving cousin, Sam Boyarski. Boyarski gave birth to a son in a displaced persons camp in Italy. They lived in Italy before moving to the United States in 1949. They lived in Philadelphia, Brooklyn, and West Palm Beach, Florida.
