= Yakov Lvovich Beilinson =

Soviet naval executive

Yakov Beilinson
- Яков Бейлинсон
- Born: 18 October 1906; Yekaterinoslav, Russian Empire
- Died: 1 June 1950 (aged 43); Karaganda, Kazakh SSR, Soviet Union
- Education: Vitebsk Pedagogical College 4
- Occupation: Naval Executive
- Known for: Head of several Ports
- Spouse: Mazurova Antonina Mikhaylovna (m. 1905–1950)
- Children: two boys
- Awards: Order of Lenin (2); Medal for the Defense of Leningrad; Medal for the Defense of Murmansk

Yakov Lvovich Beilinson (Russian: Яков Львович Бейлинсон; 18 October 1906 – 1 June 1950) was a Russian naval executive. He was Director-General of the Navy, Head of the Leningrad commercial port, (1939–41), Head of the Arkhangelsk port (1941–43), Head of the Murmansk Commercial Seaport and Head of the port of Bandar Shah (of Iran) (1943). He was a holder of two Orders of Lenin . He was repressed in 1949 and rehabilitated July 25, 1956.

== Family ==
Yakov Lvovich Beilinson was married to his wife, Mazurova Antonina Mikhaylovna (1905-1993). Until 1924, Beilinson lived with his parents in the city of Orsha, Byelorussian Soviet Socialist Republic, where he studied. He and his wife bore two sons, Viktor and Vladimir.

== Study ==
In 1925 he graduated from the Vitebsk Pedagogical College 4, after which he worked for a year as a teacher of rural school. In 1926, not passing exams to college, went to work in Moscow at the "Kleytuk" factory, where he worked until drafted into the Red Army in 1928. After serving a year in the army, after demobilization, he returned to the factory to the former place of work. In 1930 he was admitted to the Moscow Institute of Transport Engineering Institute, Water Transport Engineers’ Faculty. That same year, the Institute was transferred to Leningrad and was called the Leningrad Institute of Water Transport Engineers, from which he graduated in 1934 and sent to work in the People's Commissariat of Water Transport. After graduation in 1934, he was sent to the Mid-Volga Shipping Company as mechanization engineer, where he worked until September 1936, and then was transferred back to post-graduate study at the Institute. At the same time he served as deputy dean of mechanical faculty. At the Institute was until April 1939, after which he was appointed head of the Leningrad Merchant Marine, where he worked until November 1941, from where he was transferred to the post of Head of the Arkhangelsk port (1941–43), Head of the Murmansk port.

== Head of Ports ==
=== The Leningrad Port ===
A. Kuzmin wrote: "In 1939 Yakov Lvovich became chief of the Leningrad commercial seaport. In the new work Beilinson directed all his attention on the two areas: organization of dispatching service and expansion of the mechanization front. He understood that advanced technology should be controlled by competent, experienced personnel. And when in the next, in 1940 the port of Leningrad had to endure a tough test - throughout the navigation the port received a huge amount of bulk, especially coal and salt - the port has successfully coped with this task. At the initiative of Yakov Lvovich, after his drawings in a short time coal conveyors, salt fields were arranged. When unloading vessels monocable grabs began to be applied for the first time. Head of the port personally supervised the loading operations. According to results of 1940 the Leningrad Commercial Seaport won the competition among the ports of the Soviet Union and received Red Banner of the People’s Commissariat of the Navy”. For the first time Beilinson was head of the Leningrad commercial port since April 1939 until November 1941. For the second time - until July 29, 1949.

=== Port of Arkhangelsk ===
In October 1941, according to the order of the Deputy Chairman of People's Commissars of the USSR A.I. Mikoyan, Beilinson left for the Port of Arkhangelsk. There, in the North, during those days there were big problems to be solved: vessels came unevenly, it was required in the short term not only to unload them by vessels’ means, but also to organize the packing and transport of goods to the railway tracks in such a way as not to hold their dispatch for a minute. Y.L. Beilinson was able to overcome all the difficulties and proof of this was the Order of Lenin beautifying the chest of the Head of the Arkhangelsk port.Comrade Beilinson appointed Head of the Arkhangelsk port, Item 13, Resolution No. ГКО-875сс of November 9, 1941, the State Defense Committee. By Decree of the Presidium of the USSR Supreme Soviet of May 1, 1944, 296 people were awarded orders and medals. The Head of the Arkhangelsk port Y.L. Beilinson was awarded the Order of Lenin.

=== Port of Murmansk ===
From November 1941 to February 1943 he was Head of the port of Murmansk. "For the successful work of unloading and forwarding imported materials and food coming through the northern ports of the USSR”, - as stated in the Decree of the Presidium of the Supreme Soviet of the USSR, - Y.L. Beilinson in 1944 was awarded the second Order of Lenin." From May to September 1943 Yakov Lvovich held the post of Deputy Head of the Narkomflot Central Administration of Exploitation (Narkomflot – People’ Commissariat of Fleets). For the second time he was directed to Murmansk for the post of Head of the Port, where he worked from January to May 1944.

=== Port of Bandar-Shah ===
From Vladivostok he was recalled to the Ministry, from where he was sent on a mission to Iran for the position of Head of the port of Bandar- Shah, where he remained until January 1944.

== Publications and inventions ==
Beilinson Y. L. Experience of high-speed processing of vessels in the Leningrad Sea Commercial Port. “Morskoy Flot”, 1948, No.5, p. 16-20.

== Awards ==
- Two Orders of Lenin
- Medal for the Defense of Leningrad
- Medal for the Defense of Murmansk

== Literature ==
- Papanin I.D.: “Ice and Fire” (Lyod i Plamen’), M.: Politizdat, 1977. - 416 p.
- “On the Arkhangelsk Port”. Resolution No. ГКО-875сс of November 9, 1941 7
- Preygerzon C. I.: “Memories Diary of a former camp inmate” (Dnevnik vospominaniy byvshego lagernika) (1949-1955). - Moscow: “The Return” (Vozvrashcheniye) . 2005. - 304 pp.
- Mazurova A.M.: “About the lived through ...” (O perezhitom...), “Dialog” Journal, July, No.21, p. 17-22
- A. Kuzmin: “To be embodied into the ships, lines and other good deeds”. (Chtoby voplotit’sya v parokhody, strochki i grugiye dobriye dela), The newspaper “Sovetsky Vodnik”, 1993, May 7, No.7 (1391)
