= Yevsei Vainrub =

Soviet-Israeli tank commander

Yevsei Grigorievich Vainrub
- Евсей Григорьевич Вайнруб
- Born: 15 May [O.S. 2 May] 1909; Barysaw, Russian Empire
- Died: 20 March 2003 (aged 93); Ashdod, Israel
- Military career
- Allegiance: Soviet Union
- Branch: Red Army
- Service years: 1927 - 1950
- Rank: Colonel
- Conflicts: World War II
- Awards: Hero of the Soviet Union

Yevsei Grigorievich Vainrub (Russian: Евсе́й Григо́рьевич Вайнруб; 15 May [O.S. 2 May] 1909 in Barysaw, Russian Empire – 20 March 2003 in Ashdod, Israel) was a Soviet Colonel during World War II, Commander of the 219th Tank Brigade, Hero of the Soviet Union. He was an older brother of Hero of the Soviet Union Matvei Vainrub.
