= Matvei Vainrub =

Soviet tank commander

Matvei Grigorievich Vainrub
- Native name: Матвей Григорьевич Вайнруб
- Born: 20 May 1910; Barysaw, Russian Empire
- Died: 14 February 1998 (aged 87) Kyiv, Ukraine
- Allegiance: USSR
- Branch: Red Army
- Service years: 1931 - 1970
- Rank: General-lieutenant
- Conflicts: World War II
- Awards: Hero of the Soviet Union

Matvei Grigorievich Vainrub (Russian: Матвей Григорьевич Вайнруб; 2 May 1910 – 14 February 1998) was a Soviet Lieutenant-General, Commander of the tank troops and deputy commander of the 62nd Army (later 8th Guards Army) in the Battle of Stalingrad, World War II; Hero of the Soviet Union. Postwar, he was deputy commander of the Kiev Military District. Vainrub had a long career in the Soviet military, retiring in 1970. He was a brother of Yevsei Vainrub.
