= Pinkhus Turyan =

Soviet military officer (1896–1976)

- Native name: Пинхус Григорьевич Турьян
- Born: 20 April 1896; Lebedin, Russian Empire
- Died: 30 August 1976 (aged 80) Kyiv, Ukrainian SSR, Soviet Union
- Allegiance: Soviet Union
- Service years: 1941–1945
- Rank: Captain
- Conflicts: World War II; Eastern Front
- Awards: Hero of the Soviet Union; Order of Lenin

Pinkhus Grigorievich Turyan (Russian: Пинхус Григорьевич Турьян; 20 April 1896 – 30 August 1976) was the party organizer of the 269th separate sapper battalion in the 12 Army on the Southwestern Front. He was awarded the title Hero of the Soviet Union for his role in the Dnieper crossing.

== Biography ==
He was born in Lebedin, in a working class Jewish family. He graduated 7 classes becoming a member of CPSU in 1918. Prior to joining the army forces he occupied administrative positions in the Kiev area. Joins the army in July 1941. During the crossing of the Dnieper river on 26–28 September 1943 in the district of the village of Petro-Svistunov he led the crossing of the 269th battalion of the 12th Army of the Soviet Union on the ferries, participating in battles for the bridgeheads and repelling counterattacks. After the war he lived in Kiev working in construction management.

== Awards ==
By decree of the Presidium of the Supreme Soviet on 19 March 1944 for his courage and heroism in crossing the Dnieper River captain he was awarded the title Hero of the Soviet Union and the Order of Lenin. His name is recorded at the Ukrainian Museum of the Great Patriotic War.
