= Index of East Germany–related articles =

Articles related to East Germany include:

== A ==
Konrad Adenauer - Administrative divisions of East Germany - Aktuelle Kamera - Alexanderplatz - Alexanderplatz demonstration - Alliance 90 - Alliance for Germany - Allied Control Council - Anton Ackermann - Erich Apel - Aqua scooter - Arms race - Association of Free Democrats - Auferstanden aus Ruinen

== B ==
Egon Bahr - Rudolf Bahro - Baltic Sea - Bautzen - Johannes R. Becher - Jurek Becker - Begrüßungsgeld - Sabine Bergmann-Pohl - Berlin Airlift - Berlin Blockade - Berlin-Karlshorst - Berlin Wall - Berliner Rundfunk - Frank Beyer - Udo Beyer - Wolf Biermann - Bild-Zeitung - Lothar Bisky - Blockpartei - Bärbel Bohley - Brandenburg - Brandenburg Gate - Willy Brandt - Bertolt Brecht - Werner Bruschke - Thomas Brussig

== C ==
Cabaret - Heiner Carow - Checkpoint Charlie - Chemnitz (former Karl-Marx-Stadt) - Christian Democratic Union (East Germany) - CoCom - Cold War - Edmund Collein - Combat Groups of the Working Class - Comecon - Coming Out (1989 film) - Communist Party of Germany - Conscientious objection in East Germany - Cottbus - Council of Foreign Ministers - Cultural Association of the DDR - Culture of the German Democratic Republic

== D ==
Franz Dahlem - Democracy Now - Democratic Awakening - Democratic Farmers' Party of Germany - Democratic Women's League of Germany - DEFA (film studio) - Deutsche Reichsbahn - Deutscher Fernsehfunk - Die andere Liebe (film) - Heike Drechsler - Dresden -

== E ==
East Berlin - East Germany - East German Constitution - East German Mark - East German Green Party - East German uprising of 1953 - East Germany national football team - Economic System of Socialism - Economy of East Germany - Education in East Germany - Werner Eggerath - Hanns Eisler - Karin Enke - Erfurt - ESER - Exclusive Mandate

== F ==
Fernsehturm - Fichtelberg - Birgit Fischer - Flag of East Germany - Forum check - Four Power Agreement on Berlin - Frankfurt (Oder) - Free German Trade Union Federation - Free German Youth

== G ==
Gera - German Economic Commission - German Forum Party - German reunification - German Social Union - Ghost station - Glienicke Bridge - Marlies Göhr - Good Bye Lenin! - Otto Grotewohl - Günter Guillaume - Gregor Gysi

== H ==
Nina Hagen - Halle, Saxony-Anhalt - Hallstein Doctrine - Wolfgang Harich - Robert Havemann - Stephan Hermlin - Stefan Heym - History of East Germany - Margot Honecker - Erich Honecker - Hoheneck women's prison

== I ==
Initiative for Peace and Human Rights - Inner German border - Intershop - Interflug

== J ==
Sigmund Jähn - Jena - jokes - Jugendweihe - Junge Welt

== K ==
Kampfgruppen der Arbeiterklasse - Hermann Kant - Karat - Sarah Kirsch - Marita Koch - Katrin Krabbe - Egon Krenz - Manfred Krug

== L ==
The Legend Of Paul And Paula - Leipzig - Wolfgang Leonhard - LGBT rights in the German Democratic Republic - Liberal Democratic Party of Germany - Love Without Fear (film)

== M ==
Magdeburg - Lothar de Maizière - Kurt Masur - Henry Maske - Mecklenburg - Mecklenburg-Western Pomerania - Meissen porcelain - Erich Mielke - Military of East Germany - Ministerrat - Memorial and Education Centre Andreasstrasse - Hans Modrow - Monday demonstrations in GDR - Irmtraud Morgner - Heiner Müller - Inge Müller - Armin Mueller-Stahl

== N ==
National Democratic Party of Germany - National Front coalition - National Prize of East Germany - Neues Deutschland - New Forum - Gunda Niemann-Stirnemann - Nikolaikirche Leipzig

== O ==
Oder-Neisse line - One, Two, Three - Kristin Otto - Ore Mountains - Organization for Security and Co-operation in Europe - Ostalgie - Ostmark - Ostpolitik - Kristin Otto

== P ==
Palast der Republik - Party of Democratic Socialism (Germany) - Peace Race - Peaceful Revolution - Wilhelm Pieck - Ulrich Plenzdorf - Potsdam Agreement - Ulrike Poppe - Konrad Püschel - Puhdys

== R ==
Radio Berlin International - Radio Free Europe - Heinrich Rau - Ronald Reagan - Reisekader - Rostock - Round table Rundfunk der DDR - Rundfunk im amerikanischen Sektor

== S ==
Sandmännchen - Sachsen - Sachsen-Anhalt - Günter Schabowski - Alexander Schalck-Golodkowski - Schießbefehl - Schönefeld International Airport - Der schwarze Kanal - Schwerin - Anna Seghers - Werner Seelenbinder - Sender Freies Berlin - Horst Sindermann - Socialist Unity Party of Germany - Vasily Sokolovsky - Soviet Military Administration in Germany - Soviet occupation zone - Sportvereinigung (SV) Dynamo - Spartakiad - Traces of Stones - Stalin Note - Stasi - Stasi Records Agency - States Chamber - Steinstücken - Manfred Stolpe - Willi Stoph - Renate Stecher - SV Dynamo

== T ==
Ernst Thälmann - Thälmann pioneers - Thuringia - Ulf Timmermann - Tourism in East Germany - Trabant - Trading of East German political prisoners - Treaty on the Final Settlement with Respect to Germany - Treuhand - Der Tunnel

== U ==
Walter Ulbricht - Ulbricht Doctrine - Uprising of 1953 in East Germany - Unofficial collaborator

== V ==
VEB Robotron - Volkseigener Betrieb - Volkskammer - Volkspolizei

== W ==
Wartburg - Jens Weißflog - Wir sind das Volk - Katarina Witt - Wittenberg - Christa Wolf - Markus Wolf -

== Z ==
Wilhelm Zaisser - Georgy Zhukov

== List of unwritten articles ==
Geography of East Germany - Demographics of East Germany - Die Alternative - Staatsratsvorsitzender - Ständige Vertretung der Bundesrepublik Deutschland (de)- Selbstschussanlage (de)- Ausbürgerung (de)- Church in the GDR - Reisefreiheit (de)

== See also ==
- Lists of country-related topics
