= Orders, decorations, and medals of East Germany =

Following the 1949 establishment of the German Democratic Republic (GDR), the new state prohibited the wearing of all pre-1945 German decorations and created a new system of awards inspired in part by those of the USSR.

After German reunification in 1990, former soldiers of the East German military (which had been called the Nationale Volksarmee or NVA) transferring into the new unified German military (called the Bundeswehr) could wear NVA awards. However, the list of Bundeswehr-approved East German decorations was limited and fell under regulations for "foreign" decorations. Awards associated with some East German state agencies or Communist organizations were considered to be in breach of public order and not allowed to be worn. Those included decorations issued by the Ministry for State Security, Border Troops, Volkspolizei, Combat Groups of the Working Class, GST and the FDJ.

In total, there were 142 East German state decorations and medals and over 10.000 by non-state mass organisations. Every GDR citizen received on average ten awards in their lifetime. The inflationary use of awards increased from the 1970s onwards, and most even mid-level Socialist Unity Party functionaries receiving multiple variants of the same award.

== Honorary titles ==
| Award | Ribbon bar | Name (English/German) | Date of creation | Description |
|---|---|---|---|---|
| | | Hero of the GDR; Held der DDR | 28 October 1975 | Awarded for heroic feats in service to the East German state and society. |
| | | Hero of Labour; Held der Arbeit | 19 April 1950 | |
| | | Meritorious Member of State Security (Ehrentitel Verdienter Mitarbeiter der Staatssicherheit) | 16 December 1969 | Awarded for outstanding contributions to the protection of the state from foreign intelligence services |
| | | Meritorious Military Pilot of the GDR (Verdienter Militärflieger der DDR) | 1 August 1974 | |
| | | Honoured People's Policeman (Verdienter Volkspolizist der DDR) | 15 June 1966 | The medal was awarded in a single class for special achievements and personal dedication in the protection of the GDR. Also, for exemplary initiative that have contributed to increasing public safety and order. |
| | | Honoured Member of the National People's Army (Verdienter Angehöriger der Nationalen Volksarmee) | 14 November 1975 | The medal was awarded in a single class for outstanding achievements and merit leading to an increase in combat readiness and effectiveness. |
| | | Honoured Member of the Border Troops (Verdienter Angehöriger der Grenztruppen) | 14 November 1975 | The medal was awarded in a single class for outstanding achievements and merit leading. |
| | | Honoured Member of Civil Defense (Verdienter Angehöriger der Zivilverteidigung) | 25 October 1977 | The medal was awarded in a single class for outstanding achievements and special merit over many years of exemplary duty fulfillment of duties in increasing operational readiness. |
| | | Honoured Activist (Verdienter Aktivist) | 1 November 1953 | The medal was awarded in a single class for outstanding improvements in production, in technology or in occupational safety. |
| | | Honoured Doctor of the People (Verdienter Arzt des Volkes) | 31 March 1949 | The medal was awarded for significant and outstanding achievements in scientific research, in medical practice, in the organization of health protection, in teaching at universities and in medical colleges and in the training of the medical cadre. |

== State prizes ==
| Award | Ribbon bar | Name (English/German) | Date of creation | Description |
|---|---|---|---|---|
| | | National Prize of East Germany; Nationalpreis der DDR | 1949 | Awarded for scientific, artistic, and other meritorious achievement. |
| | | Heinrich Greif Prize; Heinrich-Greif-Preis | 1951 | Awarded for contribution to the state cinema and television industry. |
| | | Lessing Prize; Lessing-Preis | 1954 | Awarded for outstanding work in the field of the stage and the arts. |
| | | Prize for Artistic Folk Art; Preis für künstlerisches Volksschaffen | 1955 | Awarded for outstanding new creations or artistic interpretations. |
| | | Heinrich Heine Prize; Heinrich-Heine-Preis | 1956 | Awarded for outstanding lyrical works and works of literary journalism. |
| | | Carl Blechen Prize; Carl-Blechen-Preis | 1956 | Awarded for the Arts, Literature and Artistic Folk Creations. |
| | | Johannes R. Becher Medal; Johannes-R.-Becher-Medaille | 1961 | Awarded for the development of "socialist national culture in the GDR". |
| | | Art Prize of the German Democratic Republic; Kunstpreis der DDR | 1959 | Awarded for outstanding creative and interpretive achievements in visual arts, applied arts, cinema, television, radio and entertainment. |
| | | Rudolf Virchow Prize; Rudolf-Virchow-Preis | 1960 | Awarded for special achievements in the field of medical literature, medical technology and medical production. |
| | | Guts Muths Prize; GutsMuths-Preis | 1961 | Awarded for scientific achievements in the field of sports science and sports medicine. |
| | | Friedrich Engels Prize; Friedrich-Engels-Preis | 1970 | Awarded in 3 classes for outstanding scientific and organizational achievements to strengthen national defense. |
| | | | Theodor Körner Prize; Theodor-Körner-Preis | 1970 | Awarded for outstanding achievements in the creation or interpretation of works of art that contribute to strengthening the defense forces of the GDR. |
| | | Architecture Prize of the GDR; Architekturpreis der DDR | 1976 | Awarded for achievements in the field of architecture. |
| | | Design Prize of the GDR; Designpreis der DDR | 1978 | Awarded for significant contribution in increasing economic productivity. |
| | | Jacob and Wilhelm Grimm Prize; Jacob-und-Wilhelm-Grimm-Preis | 1978 | Awarded for the promotion of the German language and German studies abroad. |

== State orders ==
| Award | Ribbon bar | Name (English/German) | Date of creation | Description |
|---|---|---|---|---|
| | | Order of Karl Marx; Karl Marx Orden | 5 May 1953 | Awarded for exceptional merit in relation to ideology, culture, economy, and other designations. Additionally, citizens of other countries could also be awarded the order. |
| | | Patriotic Order of Merit; Vaterländischer Verdienstorden | 21 May 1954 | Awarded for special services to the state and to society |
| | | Banner of Labour; Banner der Arbeit | 4 August 1954 | Awarded for outstanding achievements over many years which stabilised and strengthened the country, and in particular for high results in work in the national economy. |
| | | Star of People's Friendship; Stern der Völkerfreundschaft | 20 August 1959 | Awarded for exceptional merit in contributing to the "understanding and friendship between nations and preservation of peace". |
| | | Blücher Order; Blücher Orden | 13 October 1965 | Awarded for valour in time of war (never awarded). |
| | | Scharnhorst Order; Scharnhorst-Orden | 17 February 1966 | Awarded for major contributions to the improvement principles of ideology of the GDR |
| | | Combat Order of Merit for the People and the Fatherland; Kampforden für Verdienste um Volk und Vaterland | 17 February 1966 | The medal was awarded in three classes: Bronze; Silver; Gold |

== State medals ==
=== Military and para-military decorations ===
| Award | Ribbon bar | Name (English/German) | Date of creation | Description |
|---|---|---|---|---|
| | | Decoration of the German People's Police (Ehrenzeichen der Deutschen Volkspolizei) | 1 June 1949 | The medal was awarded in a single class for outstanding achievements, for personal bravery and selfless dedication. |
| | | Decoration of Honour for Excellent Performance in Fire Protection (Ehrenzeichen für hervorragende Leistungen im Brandschutz) | 10 February 1983 | The medal was awarded in a single class for exemplary performances in ensuring fire protection, for great bravery in fighting fires in the protection of the lives of citizens of the GDR, in preventing major damage, for significant results in the development of fire protection in the GDR, for international cooperation of bodies of fire protection. |
| | | Medal for Exemplary Border Service (Medaille für vorbildlichen Grenzdienst der Grenztruppen der DDR) | 28 May 1954 | The medal was awarded in a single class for exemplary performance and personal commitment in securing the state border of the GDR |
| | | Medal for Excellence in the Armed Organs of the Interior Ministry (Medaille für ausgezeichnete Leistungen in den bewaffneten Organen des Ministeriums des Innern) | 4 June 1959 | The medal was awarded in a single class for excellent performance of tasks, in particular in the strengthening and consolidation of the GDR. |
| | | Medal for Excellent Performance in the Combat Groups of the Working Class (Medaille für ausgezeichnete Leistungen in den Kampfgruppen der Arbeiterklasse) | 6 October 1965 | The medal was awarded in a single class for special merit in the deployment, development and consolidation of combat groups, for excellent performance in leadership and training, for the care and maintenance of equipment and armament. |
| | | Medal of Merit in Fire Protection (Medaille für Verdienste im Brandschutz) | 24 August 1968 | The medal was awarded in a single class for outstanding achievements as well as personal bravery and selfless dedication in the fulfillment of fire protection duties in the safeguarding of the national economy as well as the life, health and protection of the personal property of the citizens of the GDR. |
| | | Medal of Merit of the National People's Army (Verdienstmedaille der Nationalen Volksarmee) | 1 June 1956 | The medal was awarded in three classes for outstanding merit and personal readiness in support of increases in combat capabilities and readiness of the National People's Army: Bronze; Silver; Gold |
| | | Medal of Merit of Organs of the Ministry of the Interior (Verdienstmedaille der Organe des Ministeriums des Innern) | 15 June 1966 | The medal was awarded in three classes for merit and personal commitment in increasing public order and security; for the protection of the structure of socialism in the GDR and the consolidation of the German People's Police and the Ministry of the Interior: Bronze; Silver; Gold |
| | | Medal of Merit of the Border Troops of the GDR (Verdienstmedaille der Grenztruppen der DDR) | 25 October 1977 | The medal was awarded in 3 classes for outstanding achievements and personal dedication in maintaining the security of the borders of the GDR. Also for political and military leadership as well as for education and training.: Bronze; Silver; Gold |
| | | Medal of Merit of the Combat Groups of the Working Class (Verdienstmedaille der Kampfgruppen der Arbeiterklasse) | 25 September 1961 | The medal was awarded in three classes for faithful fulfillment of duties and recognition of exemplary achievements in the ranks of the combat groups of the GDR: Bronze; Silver; Gold |
| | | Medal of Merit of the Customs Administration of the GDR (Verdienstmedaille der Zollverwaltung der DDR) | 12 May 1967 | The medal was awarded in three classes to individuals or collectives of the GDR or other socialist states, for services in fulfilling duties in the customs administration that contributed to strengthening and securing the GDR: Bronze; Silver; Gold |
| | | Medal of Merit of Civil Defense (Verdienstmedaille der Zivilverteidigung) | 16 September 1970 | The medal was awarded in three classes to members and collectives of the Civil Defense of the GDR, to citizens of the GDR as well as to foreign nationals of socialist brother states, companies and institutions; for special merit in increasing the operational readiness, the education and training, the maintenance of and development of technical equipment of civil defense: Bronze; Silver; Gold |
| | | Medal Brotherhood in Arms (Medaille der Waffenbrüderschaft) | 17 February 1966 | The medal was awarded in three classes for achievements and merit in the consolidation of the relationships between the fraternal socialist armies and the development of mutual cooperation: Bronze; Silver; Gold |
| | | Medal for Faithful Service in the Barracked People's Police (Medaille für treue Dienste in der Kasernierten Volkspolizei) | 28 April 1954 | The medal was awarded in a single class for 5 years of honest, conscientious and faithful service in the armed organs of the GDR. It was replaced by the Medal For Faithful Service in the National People’s Army in 1956. |
| | | Medal For Faithful Service in the National People’s Army (Medaille für treue Dienste in der Nationalen Volksarmee) | 1 June 1956 | The medal was awarded in four classes: 5 years service (bronze); 10 years service (silver); 15 years service (gold); 20 years service (gold) with colored flags on the medal and Roman numerals XX on the ribbon |
| | | Medal For Faithful Service in the Border Guards of the GDR (Medaille für treue Dienste in den Grenztruppen der DDR) | 25 October 1977 | The medal was awarded in four classes: 5 years service (bronze); 10 years service (silver); 15 years service (gold); 20 years service (gold) with colored flags on the medal and Roman numerals XX on the ribbon |
| | | Medal for Faithful Service in the Civil Defense of the GDR (Medaille für treue Dienste in der Zivilverteidigung der DDR) | 25 October 1977 | The medal was awarded to personnel of the Civil Defense in four classes: 5 years service (bronze); 10 years service (silver); 15 years service (gold); 20 years service (gold) with Roman numerals XX on the ribbon |
| | | Medal for Faithful Service in Militarised Organs of the Interior Ministry (Medaille für Treue Dienste in den bewaffneten Organen des Ministeriums des Innern) | 22 January 1959 | The medal was awarded in six classes: 5 years service (bronze); 10 years service (silver); 15 years service (gold); 20 years service (gold); 25 years service (gold); 30 years service (gold) |
| | | Medal for Loyal Service in the Customs Administration of the GDR (Medaille für treue Dienste in der Zollverwaltung der DDR) | 12 May 1967 | The medal was awarded in six classes to all employees of the customs administration upon reaching a fixed, uninterrupted period of honest, conscientious and faithful service: 5 years service (bronze); 10 years service (silver); 15 years service (gold); 20 years service (gold + 1 oak leaf); 25 years service (gold + 2 oak leaves); 30 years service (gold + 3 oak leaves) |
| | | Medal for Faithful Service in the Combat Groups of the Working Class (Medaille für Treue Dienste in den Kampfgruppen der Arbeiterklasse) | 6 October 1965 | The medal was awarded in four classes: 5 years service (bronze); 10 years service (silver); 15 years service (gold); 20 years service (gold) with gold circular ribbon device (post 1978) |
| | | Medal for Faithful Fulfillment of Duties in the Civil Defense of the GDR (Medaille für treue Pflichterfüllung in der Zivilverteidigung der DDR) | 25 October 1977 | The medal was awarded in three classes to volunteers: 10 years service (bronze); 20 years service (silver); 30 years service (gold) |

=== Civilian decorations ===
| Award | Ribbon bar | Name (English/German) | Date of creation | Description |
|---|---|---|---|---|
| | | Medal of Merit of the GDR (Verdienstmedaille der DDR) | 1959-06-04 | Awarded for distinction through special achievements and faithful fulfillment of duties in the construction of socialism. |
| | | Hans Beimler Medal (Hans Beimler Medaille) | 1956-05-17 | Awarded for fighting in the Spanish Civil War on the side of the Republicans. |
| | | Medal for Fighters Against Fascism (Medaille für Kämpfer gegen den Faschismus) | 1958-02-22 | Awarded for involvement in the resistance against the Nazi regime 1933–45. |
| | | Lifesaving Medal of the GDR (Lebensrettungsmedaille der DDR) | 1954-05-28 | Awarded for the salvation of people while in mortal danger to the rescuer. |
| | | Medal for Fighting the Flood Disaster in July 1954 (Medaille für die Bekämpfung der Hochwasserkatastrophe im Juli 1954) | 1954-08-05 | Awarded for selfless commitment, exemplary work and self-sacrifice in combating the floods and in the subsequent repairs of damages in Saxony, the Ore Mountains and the Elster Mountains in July 1954. |
| | | Medal for Selfless Action in the Fight Against Disasters (Medaille für selbstlosen Einsatz bei der Bekämpfung von Katastrophen) | 1957-08-15 | Awarded for selfless dedication, exemplary assistance and personal sacrifice, as well as other outstanding services in preventing or combating disasters and eliminating their aftermath. |
| | | Medal for Excellent Performance in Water Management of the GDR (Medaille für hervorragende Leistungen in der Wasserwirtschaft der DDR) | 1975-01-30 | Awarded for excellent performance in the socialist competition as well as the fulfillment of, or zeal in the tasks set by the water management of the GDR, in connection with many years of activity in this field. |
| | | Commemorative Medal: 20th Anniversary of Democratic Land Reform (Erinnerungsmedaille 20. Jahrestag Demokratische Bodenreform) | 1965-07-27 | Awarded for a special contribution to the implementation of land reform, the founding of agricultural cooperatives or to the socialist transformation of agriculture. |
| | | Medal of Honour for the 40th Anniversary of the GDR (Ehrenmedaille zum 40. Jahrestag der DDR) | 1988-10-14 | Awarded for outstanding achievements in the emergence and overall strengthening of the GDR and for the active participation in the design of the socialist society. |
| | | Hufeland Medal (Hufeland-Medaille) | 1958-09-13 | The medal was awarded in three classes for special merit, exemplary initiative in socialist competition and the fulfillment of prescribed tasks in health and social services of the GDR. Also for many years of meritorious work in these areas as well as in administration and in the medical professions: Bronze; Silver; Gold |
| | | Dr. Theodor Neubauer Medal (Dr.-Theodor-Neubauer-Medaille) | 1959-08-20 | The medal was awarded in three classes both to individuals and collectives for extraordinary contributions and achievements in the development of socialist education in the GDR: Bronze; Silver; Gold |
| | | Medal of Merit of the Maritime Industry (Verdienstmedaille der Seeverkehrswirtschaft) | 1965-07-01 | The medal was awarded in three classes for exemplary work successes through active and selfless commitment or longstanding meritorious activities in the field of maritime transport: Bronze; Silver; Gold |
| | | Medal of Merit of the German Post (Verdienstmedaille der Deutschen Post) | 1970-11-19 | The medal was awarded to individuals in three classes for outstanding achievements in the development of the postal and telecommunications system. Also for services in ensuring the constant operational readiness of the telecommunication systems: Bronze; Silver; Gold |
| | | Medal of Merit of the German Railroads (Verdienstmedaille der Deutschen Reichsbahn) | 1956-10-18 | The medal was awarded in three classes for selfless service, for high achievements or for courage: 3rd class; 2nd class; 1st class |
| | | Medal of Merit in the People's Control of the GDR (Medaille für Verdienste in der Volkskontrolle der DDR) | 1973-02-12 | The medal was awarded in three classes for many years of exemplary work in the People's Control of the GDR and for excellent results in the control of the implementation of the resolutions of the SED and the government of the GDR: 3rd class; 2nd class; 1st class |
| | | Pestalozzi Medal for Faithful Services (Pestalozzi-Medaille für treue Dienste) | 1956-11-15 | The medal was awarded in three classes to teachers and educators of vacational and educational institutions of the GDR.: 10 years (Bronze); 20 years (Silver); 30 years (Gold) |
| | | Medal for Faithful Service for Voluntary Helpers in Guarding State Borders (Medaille für Treue Dienste freiwilliger Helfer beim Schutz der Staatsgrenze der DDR) | 1986-12-05 | The medal was awarded in six classes: 5 years service (bronze); 10 years service (bronze); 15 years service (silver); 20 years service (silver); 25 years service (gold); 30 years service (gold) |
| | | Medal for Faithful Service in Civil Aviation (Medaille für treue Dienste in der zivilen Luftfahrt) | 1962-09-13 | The medal was awarded in seven classes: 5 years service (bronze); 10 years service (silver); 15 years service (gold level 1); 20 years service (gold level 2); 30 years service (gold level 3); 35 years service (gold with honour clasp for women); 40 years service (gold with honour clasp for men) |
| | | Medal for Faithful Service in the German Railroads (Medaille für Treue Dienste bei der Deutschen Reichsbahn) | 1956-03-18 | The medal was originally awarded in three classes increased to five in 1973: 10 years service (bronze); 20 years service (silver); 30 years service (gold); 35 years service (gold with honour clasp for women); 40 years service (gold with honour clasp for men) |
| | | Medal for Faithful Service in Health and Social Services (Medaille für Treue Dienste im Gesundheits und Sozialwesens) | 1973-11-15 | The medal was awarded in three classes: 10 years service (bronze); 20 years service (silver); 30 years service (gold) |
| | | Medal for Faithful Service in the German Post (Treuedienstmedaille der Deutschen Post) | 1960-10-13 | The medal was awarded in five classes: 10 years service (bronze); 20 years service (silver); 30 years service (gold); 35 years service (gold with honour clasp for women); 40 years service (gold with honour clasp for men) |
| | | Medal for Faithful Service in the Volunteer Fire Department (GDR) (Medaille für Treue Dienste in der Freiwilligen Feuerwehr) | 1959-01-22 | The medal was awarded in four classes: 10 years service (bronze); 20 years service (silver); 30 years service (gold); 40 years service (gold with ribbon device) |
| | | Medal for Faithful Service in the Maritime Industry (Medaille für treue Dienste in der Seeverkehrswirtschaft) | 1965-07-01; Amended 1981-09-21 | The medal was awarded in three classes: 10 years service (bronze); 20 years service (silver); 30 years service (gold); 35 years service (gold with honour clasp for women); 40 years service (gold with honour clasp for men) |
| | | Medal for Long Service in Strengthening the National Defense of the GDR (Medaille für langjährige Pflichterfüllung zur Stärkung der Landesverteidigung der DDR) | 1974-08-08 | The medal was awarded in four classes to employees of the Defense Industry: 10 years service (bronze); 20 years service (silver); 30 years service (gold); 35 years service for women, 40 for men (special gold) |
| | | Humboldt Medal (Humboldt-Medaille) | 1975-02-13 | The medal was awarded in three classes for exemplary fulfillment of tasks at higher and technical colleges, also for many years of loyal service.: Bronze; Silver; Gold |

== Ministerial and associative awards ==
=== Ministry of National Defence ===
| Award | Ribbon bar | Name (English/German) | Date of creation | Description |
|---|---|---|---|---|
| | | Medal for Merit in Reservist Work (Medaille für Verdienste in der Reservistenarbeit) | 1985-05-28 | The medal was awarded in three classes to reservists or veterans of military service, for outstanding services in the development and management of reservist work while not on reservist military service: Bronze; Silver; Gold |
| | | Reservist Badge (NVA) (Reservistenabzeichen) | 1969 | The medal was awarded in three classes: 18 to 24 months service (bronze); 2 to 10 years service (silver); More than 10 years service (gold) |
| | | National People's Army 30 Year Jubilee Medal (Jubiläumsmedaille „30 Jahre Nationale Volksarmee“) | 1986-03-01 | The medal was awarded to a select group of people from the NVA, others receiving a related badge. |

=== Ministry of Education ===
| Award | Ribbon bar | Name (English/German) | Date of creation | Description |
|---|---|---|---|---|
| | | Lessing Medal (Lessing-Medaille) | 1950-04-28 | Awarded in 2 classes for excellent performance and very good social and extra-curricular work in senior high school.: Silver; Gold |

=== Combat Groups of the Working Class of the GDR ===
| Award | Ribbon bar | Name (English/German) | Date of creation | Description |
|---|---|---|---|---|
| | | Commemorative Medal 20 Years of Combat Groups of the Working Class (Erinnerungsmedaille „20 Jahre Kampfgruppen der Arbeiterklasse“) | September 1973 | The medal was awarded in a single class to deserving members of the combat groups of the working class. |

=== Society for Sports and Technology ===
| Award | Ribbon bar | Name (English/German) | Date of creation | Description |
|---|---|---|---|---|
| | | Ernst Schneller Medal (Ernst-Schneller-Medaille) | 1961 | The medal was awarded in three classes for outstanding services in the education of youth in defense readiness: Bronze; Silver; Gold |

=== Free German Youth Society ===
These were awarded to Free German Youth (F.D.J.) members;

| Award | Ribbon bar | Name (English/German) | Date of creation | Description |
|---|---|---|---|---|
| | | Artur Becker Medal (Artur-Becker-Medaille) | 1959 | The medal was awarded in three classes for outstanding achievements in the socialist youth association: Awarded by city leadership (bronze); Awarded by county leadership (silver); Awarded by district leadership (gold) |
| | | Thalmann Medal (Thälmann-Medaille) | 1951-08-15 | The medal was awarded to all participants of the peace demonstration of the Free German Youth. |

=== Socialist Unity Party ===
These were conferred by the Socialist Unity Party (S.E.D.);

| Award | Ribbon bar | Name (English/German) | Date of creation | Description |
|---|---|---|---|---|
| | | Medal of the 20th anniversary of the GDR (Medaille zum 20. Jahrestag der DDR) | 1969 | The medal was awarded in a single class to members of the Socialist Unity Party of Germany and to honoured dignitaries. |

== See also ==
Germany

- Berlin
  - Berlin Wall
  - East Berlin
  - West Berlin
- History of East Germany
- History of Germany since 1945
- Inner German border
- Iron Curtain
- Leaders of East Germany
- Ministerrat
- West Germany

Armed Forces

- Conscientious objection in East Germany
- Grenztruppen (Border troops)
- Landstreitkräfte (Ground troops)
- Luftstreitkräfte (Air Force)
- National People's Army
- Stasi (Secret police)
- Volksmarine (Navy)
- Volkspolizei (Police)

Media

- Aktuelle Kamera, GDR's main TV news show
- Der Tunnel, a film about a mass evacuation to West Berlin through a tunnel
- Deutscher Fernsehfunk
- East German Cold War Propaganda
- Good Bye, Lenin!, a tragicomedy film about the German reunification
- Radio Berlin International
- Rundfunk der DDR

Transport

- Barkas
- Deutsche Reichsbahn – The railway company of the GDR
- Interflug – The airline of the GDR
- Trabant
- Transport in the German Democratic Republic
- Wartburg

Other

- Education in the German Democratic Republic
- Index of East Germany-related articles
- GDR jokes
- Ostalgie (Nostalgia, missing the DDR)
- Palast der Republik
- Dean Reed
- Sportvereinigung (SV) Dynamo
- Tourism in East Germany
- Omoiyari Yosan (DDR government→USSR Forces)
- Captive Nations
- Socialist orders of merit
