= Badge for Long Voyage =

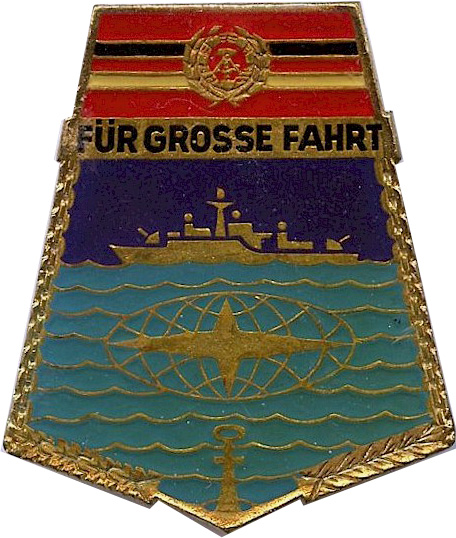
Badge for Long Voyage / Abzeichen für Große Fahrt

The People's Navy (Volksmarine) Badge for Long Voyage (German: Abzeichen für Große Fahrt) was a non-state honor of the National People's Army (NVA) awarded by the German Democratic Republic (GDR).

== Establishment and qualification ==
The award of the People's Navy badge "for Long Voyage" was instituted on May 27, 1981, per instruction No. 43/81 issued by General Heinz Hoffmann, the Minister for National Defense. This badge could be given as a non-state honor to all members and civilian employees of the People's Navy as well as in exceptional cases also to members of foreign fleets. The requirements to qualify for this award were participation in special tasks or accumulation of a specified number of nautical miles, related to individual ship types. The badge was issued from August 1981 until German unification in 1990. It was modeled after the Soviet Navy's long voyage badge. The Polish navy had a similar badge as the Soviet, East German, and Polish Navies participated in joint Warsaw Pact naval exercises in the Baltic Sea.

== Appearance and wear ==
This five-sided badge is 1 1/2 inches (38 mm) at its widest by 1 3/4 inches (44 mm) high and is made from a non-ferrous metal. At the top is the red-colored service flag for combat ships and boats of the People's Navy, below it in a single line is the black inscription Für Große Fahrt (FOR LONG VOYAGE) on a golden background. Below this, centrally situated against a dark blue background, is a People's Navy warship shown moving to the left finished in gold. Below it are turquoise waves and the stylized symbol of a globe with a superimposed compass. On the left and right edges are gold-colored chains, which terminate on the left into a branch of oak leaves and right into a branch of laurel, between which is a gold-colored anchor. The badge is covered with polyester resin. The back features a soldered horizontal pin with a hook closure to secure it to the Sailor's uniform. It was to be worn on the right chest of the uniform under the classification badge. The badge was awarded with a certificate signed by the Chief of the People's Navy.

== See also ==
- Awards and decorations of East Germany
