= Love Without Fear =

Love Without Fear may refer to:

- Love Without Fear (album), an album by Dan Wilson
- Love Without Fear (film), a 1989 East German public-education documentary film
