= Honoured Doctor of the People =

German award

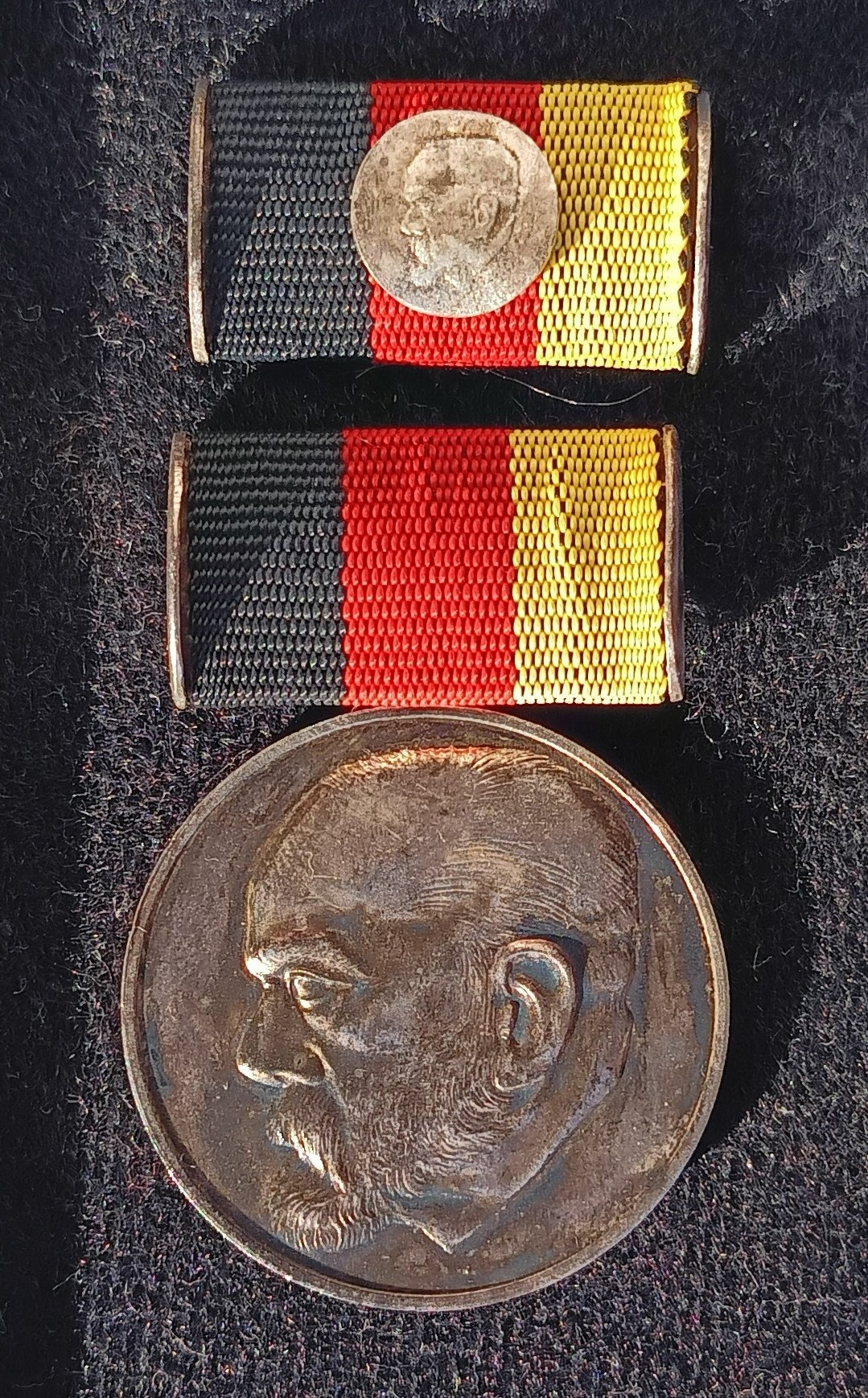
- Medal of Helga Mateoschat
- Native name: Verdienter Arzt des Volkes
- Type: Honorary title
- Awarded for: Medicine
- Date: 11 December
- Country: East Germany
- Established: 31 March 1949

Highlights
- Total recipients: Approx. 1,176

Honoured Doctor of the People (German: Verdienter Arzt des Volkes) was the highest honorary title awarded to physicians in East Germany for significant achievements in medical research or practice. It was given in form of a medal. The title was established on 31 March 1949.

With few exceptions, it was awarded every year on 11 December, the birthday of Robert Koch celebrated as Day of the Health Service in East Germany. In total approximately 1,176 people received the award, excluding awards that were not published, such as those to Stasi psersonel. A person could be awarded only once with the title. The title came with a certificate and a prize of 7,000 East German marks.

== See also ==
- Orders, decorations, and medals of East Germany
- People's Doctor of the USSR
- List of medicine awards

== Sources ==
- Bundesministerium für innerdeutsche Beziehungen (Hrsg.): DDR-Handbuch, Auszeichnungen, Verlag Wissenschaft und Politik, 1985, S. 26 und 29, ISBN 3804686427.
- Andreas Herbst, Winfried Ranke, Jürgen R. Winkler: So funktionierte die DDR, Lexikon der Organisationen und Institutionen; Gesundheitswesen, Rowohlt Taschenbuch, 1994, ISBN 3499163489.
