= Dirk Kummer =

German actor and director (born 1966)

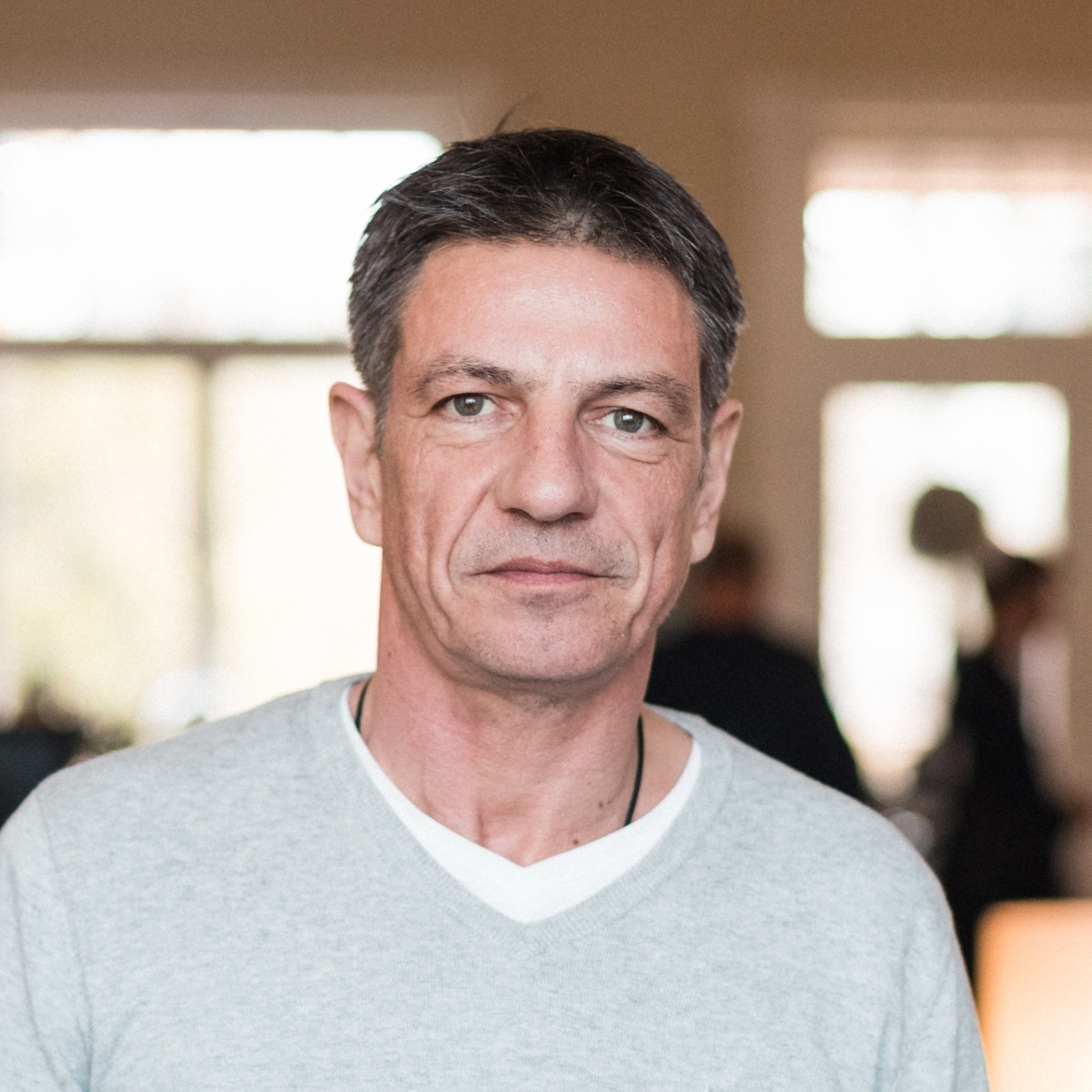
- Dirk Kummer 2020
- Born: 29 September 1966 (age 59); Hennigsdorf, Brandenburg, East Germany
- Occupations: Actor, director
- Years active: 1979–present

Dirk Kummer (born 29 September 1966 in Hennigsdorf) is a German actor, director, and screenwriter. He is best known for directing movies Sugar Sand (2017), Wohin mit den Witwen (1999) and Rosenzweig's Freedom (1998).

== Early life ==
Kummer first grew up in Falkensee and moved to East Berlin in 1973. He had his first acting role in 1979 aged 13, in the two-parter TV movie Meines Vaters Straßenbahn on the Deutscher Fernsehfunk channel. After he had graduated from school in 1985, Kummer performed three years of military service with the border troops. Then from 1989 to 1992, he was a master student of the Berlin Academy of Arts in the Performing Arts section. In parallel, he also studied between 1989 and 1990 as a guest at the Konrad Wolf Film University of Babelsberg, specializing in directing and as a guest student at the state-run Berlin drama school Ernst Busch Academy of Dramatic Arts.

His first big movie role was in one of the last DEFA productions called Coming Out. In addition to his involvement as one of the main actors in the role of 'Matthias', he worked in this production as assistant to director Heiner Carow. The premiere of the film took place on the evening of the fall of the Berlin Wall (9 November 1989), at the East Berlin premiere at Kino International.

In 1992, Kummer went to Switzerland and took acting classes there for one year at the University of Music and Performing Arts Bern (now part of University of the Arts Bern). From 1993 to 2002, he worked only sporadically as an actor and mainly as a directing assistant among others with Konrad Sabrautzky, Richard Huber (Mein Leben & Ich), Kaspar Heidelbach (A Light in Dark Places), Susanne Schneider (The Day Will Come), Anna Justice (Remembrance (2011)) and Gunther Scholz. In 2002, he received an author scholarship from the Drehbuchwerkstatt Nürnberg and the Bayerischer Rundfunk.

Since about 2003, Dirk Kummer works almost exclusively as a director and scriptwriter. After stops in Bavaria, Baden-Wuerttemberg and Berlin, he now resides again in Brandenburg.

He has also directed plays at theatres including "Carl's Work - Part 1" (in 2014) and "The Abolition of the Night" (in 2015) at Schauspiel Köln.

His short film Zuckersand was awarded the 'Bernd Burgemeister Fernsehpreis' at the 2017 Munich Film Festival, the 3sat Audience Award at the 2010 Baden-Baden TV Film Festival and the Grimme Prize in 2018. His script for the film was awarded a prize in 2003, the Thomas Strittmatter Award.

== Filmography ==
=== Actor ===
Year	Title	Role	Notes
1979	My Father's Streetcar		(TV film, also known as Meines Vaters Straßenbahn)
1986	Rund um die Uhr	'Jugendlicher im Fuhrwerk' or teenager in wagon	(TV series, 1 episode)
1988	Die andere Liebe	as himself	(short documentary)
1989	Coming Out	'Matthias'	
1992	The Mistake (or Die Verfehlung)	Holger Bosch	
1995	Kanzlei Bürger	Edgar Wunsch	(TV series, 1 episode)
1998	100 Years of Brecht (or 'Hundert Jahre Brecht')	actor	Documentary
1998	A.S.	Sergio Pavese	(TV series, 1 episode "Letzter Bluff")
1999	Die Hochzeitskuh	Conductor	(TV movie)

=== Director ===
Year	Title	Notes
1999	Wohin mit den Witwen	(Short, also written by Kummer)
2003	Geschlecht: weiblich	(TV film)
2005	Charlotte und ihre Männer	(TV film), won the Audience Award in 2005
2009	Keiner geht verloren	(TV film)
2010	Dienstags ein Held sein	(TV film)
2017	Sugar Sand (Or Zuckersand)	(TV film), winner of 54th Grimme Prize 2018
