= Polytechnic Secondary School =

Standard type of school in the school system of East Germany (GDR)

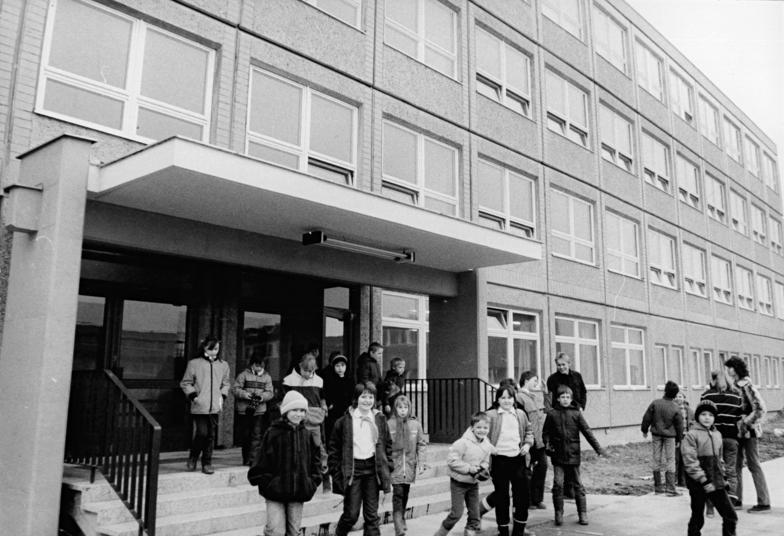
Polytechnic Secondary School 56 in Marzahn, East Berlin, 1984

The polytechnic secondary school, officially ten-class general educational polytechnic secondary school, abbreviation POS, pronounced P-O-S, was the standard type of school in the school system of East Germany. The POS was established in 1959 to replace the hitherto existing Grundschule. The school structure was a ten-class comprehensive school without any internal or external differentiation. There was a final examination at the end of the 10th grade called Abschlußprüfung, granting the Abschlußzeugnis which allowed to continue one's education to vocational training. Students with very good achievements at school were admitted to college studies or a unique education program that combined the studies of the extended secondary school and a vocational training. Students with honors got entrance to the extended polytechnic secondary school. The general style of teaching was a rather strict and authoritative version of different, highly efficient techniques of classroom management, used long before Jacob Kounin described this concept in the USA in 1974.

The German designation of this type of school was officially Zehnklassige allgemeinbildende polytechnische Oberschule, shortened polytechnische Oberschule, later capitalized Polytechnische Oberschule by the education act of 1965, in documents of the Ministry of People's Education often called ambiguously Oberschule since 1966.

== Table of lessons ==
The table of lessons determined the workload of a student, in other words the number of lessons which were taught on each subject every week. One lesson lasted 45 minutes.

=== Table of lessons 1959 ===
| | grade | 1 | 2 | 3 | 4 | 5 | 6 | 7 | 8 | 9 | 10 |
Compulsory teaching
| German language and literature | | 9 | 12 | 14 | 16 | 7 | 6 | 5 | 5 | 5 | 4 |
| Russian language | | – | – | – | – | 6 | 5 | 4 | 3 | 3 | 3 |
| Mathematics | | 6 | 6 | 6 | 6 | 6 | 6 | 6 | 5 | 5 | 5 |
| Physics | | – | – | – | – | – | 3 | 3 | 3 | 3 | 4 |
| Chemistry | | – | – | – | – | – | – | 2 | 3 | 3 | 4 |
| Biology | | – | – | – | – | 3 | 2 | 2 | 2 | 2 | 2 |
| Geography | | – | – | – | – | 2 | 2 | 2 | 2 | 2 | 1 |
| Astronomy | | – | – | – | – | – | – | – | – | – | 1 |
| Technical drawing | | – | – | – | – | – | – | 1 | 1 | 1 | 1 |
| Technical studies and productive work | | – | – | – | – | – | – | 3 | 4 | 4 | 4 |
| Handicrafts | | 1 | 1 | 1 | 2 | 2 | 2 | – | – | – | – |
| Needlework | | – | – | 1 | 1 | – | – | – | – | – | – |
| History | | – | – | – | – | 1 | 2 | 2 | 2 | 2 | 2 |
| Civics and Politics | | – | – | – | – | – | – | – | – | 1 | 2 |
| Arts | | 1 | 1 | 1 | 1 | 1 | 1 | 1 | 1 | 1 | – |
| Music | | 1 | 1 | 1 | 1 | 1 | 1 | 1 | 1 | 1 | 1 |
| Physical education | | 2 | 2 | 3 | 3 | 3 | 3 | 2 | 2 | 2 | 2 |
| Sum of compulsory lessons | | 20 | 23 | 27 | 30 | 32 | 33 | 34 | 34 | 35 | 36 |
Elective teaching
| 2nd foreign language | | – | – | – | – | – | – | 4 | 4 | 3 | 2 |
| Needlework | | – | – | – | – | 1 | 1 | – | – | – | – |
| Number of lessons at most | | 20 | 23 | 27 | 30 | 33 | 34 | 38 | 38 | 38 | 38 |

=== Table of lessons 1971 ===
The school reform in East Germany in 1965 with its new education act brought a lot of changes to the POS. The compulsory subject Needlework was cancelled and transformed into an elective subject recommended for girls. The successful concept of the school garden and its cultivation was established as a compulsory subject to expand the agricultural elements, to directly prepare the subject Biology and to extend the time of being outside in touch with nature. Because of an in-depth revision of the curriculum - the contents of physical geography and earth sciences were reduced, the contents of economic geography and political geography were increased - Geography was not a strong scientific subject anymore and drifted to the subject group of languages, arts and sociological-political studies.

As the table shows, the number of lessons for one week was distinctly reduced in comparison to 1959. This measure led to vigorous criticism behind closed doors because the POS was initially designed as a further developed concept of the former German Realgymnasium. The tough compulsory workload, which exceeded the workload of any contemporary West German type of school by far, especially in German language, mathematics, sciences and technics, ensured a high academic achievement for all children. The Ministry of People's Education justified the controversial reduction as a reorientation of the curriculum focussing on the essentials and providing more freedom of choice for the students. Nevertheless, even the reduced number of lessons still exceeded the vast majority of West German schools and even today the amount of compulsory teaching of German language, mathematics, sciences and technics has not been reached again. The other side of the non-public criticism was the expansion of the ideology-burdened subjects like politics at the same time.

Additional elective courses were established at the beginning of the eighties. Each course was built on a specific framework program given by the Ministry of People's education, but the standards were more general and not tight like the curriculum for the compulsory subjects. The teacher could take a lot of liberty to plan and teach an additional elective course. Most of the courses covered topics from mathematics, physics, chemistry, crafts, arts, architecture, music, technical studies and conversation in a foreign language. All of these courses were very popular among students.

| | grade | 1 | | 2 | 3 | 4 | 5 | 6 | 7 | 8 | 9 | 10 |
| | | 1st term | 2nd term |
Compulsory teaching
| German language and literature | | 11 | 10 | 12 | 14 | 14 | 7 | 6 | 5 | 5 | 4 | 3 |
| Russian language | | – | – | – | – | – | 6 | 5 | 3 | 3 | 3 | 3 |
| Mathematics | | 5 | 5 | 6 | 6 | 6 | 6 | 6 | 6 | 4 | 5 | 4 |
| Physics | | – | – | – | – | – | – | 3 | 2 | 2 | 3 | 3 |
| Chemistry | | – | – | – | – | – | – | – | 2 | 4 | 2 | 2 |
| Biology | | – | – | – | – | – | 2 | 2 | 1 | 2 | 2 | 2 |
| Geography | | – | – | – | – | – | 2 | 2 | 2 | 2 | 1 | 2 |
| Astronomy | | – | – | – | – | – | – | – | – | – | – | 1 |
| Technical drawing | | – | – | – | – | – | – | – | 1 | 1 | – | – |
| Technical studies | | – | – | – | – | – | – | – | 1 | 1 | 2 | 2 |
| Productive work | | – | – | – | – | – | – | – | 2 | 2 | 3 | 3 |
| Handicrafts | | 1 | 1 | 1 | 1 | 2 | 2 | 2 | – | – | – | – |
| School garden | | – | 1 | 1 | 1 | 1 | – | – | – | – | – | – |
| History | | – | – | – | – | – | 1 | 2 | 2 | 2 | 2 | 2 |
| Civics and Politics | | – | – | – | – | – | – | – | 1 | 1 | 1 | 2 |
| Arts | | 1 | 1 | 1 | 1 | 2 | 1 | 1 | 1 | 1 | 1 | – |
| Music | | 1 | 1 | 1 | 2 | 1 | 1 | 1 | 1 | 1 | 1 | 1 |
| Physical education | | 2 | 2 | 2 | 2 | 3 | 3 | 3 | 2 | 2 | 2 | 2 |
| Sum of compulsory lessons | | 21 | 21 | 24 | 27 | 29 | 31 | 33 | 32 | 33 | 32 | 32 |
Elective teaching
| 2nd foreign language | | – | – | – | – | – | – | – | 3 | 3 | 3 | 2 |
| Additional elective courses | | – | – | – | – | – | – | – | – | – | 2 | 2 |
| Needlework | | – | – | – | – | 1 | 1 | – | – | – | – | – |
| Number of lessons at most | | 21 | 21 | 24 | 27 | 30 | 32 | 33 | 35 | 36 | 37 | 36 |

== Final exams ==
At the end of the 10th grade all students had to pass a number of large-scale compulsory and optionally compulsory exams. There were both written exams and oral exams.

- one written exam in German language and literature, duration 240 minutes
  The students had to write an essay on one of four given topics. The essay had to have at least 1000 words and was graded for content, grammar, orthography, style and quality of handwriting.
- one written exam in mathematics, duration 240 minutes
  The Students had to solve seven different mathematical problems in the fields of geometry, equations, systems of equations, inequalities, percentage calculation, functions, arithmetics, mathematical proofs, sets of numbers and applying mathematical knowledge to practical problems.
- one written exam in one of the four subjects physics, chemistry, biology or geography, duration 240 minutes
  The students had to solve a number of theoretical problems or questions, and furthermore, they had to conduct a minimum of one experiment during the exam followed by an analysis. The students could choose which of the four exams they wanted to take.
- one written exam in Russian language, duration 120 minutes
  The students had to translate a long Russian text into German.

At first the exams in German language, mathematics and sciences were carried out on three consecutive days without any break starting on a Monday, followed by the exam in Russian language on the next Monday. During the seventies the examination week was reorganized and there was a day off between every single exam.

About four weeks later the written exams were followed by the oral exams. All students had to take at least two exams and could take five exams at the most. The number of subjects and the subjects the students had to take the exam in, individually were determined by the teacher's council for every student. Students who probably would graduate with honors had to take five oral exams.
