= Matthias Freihof =

German television actor and director

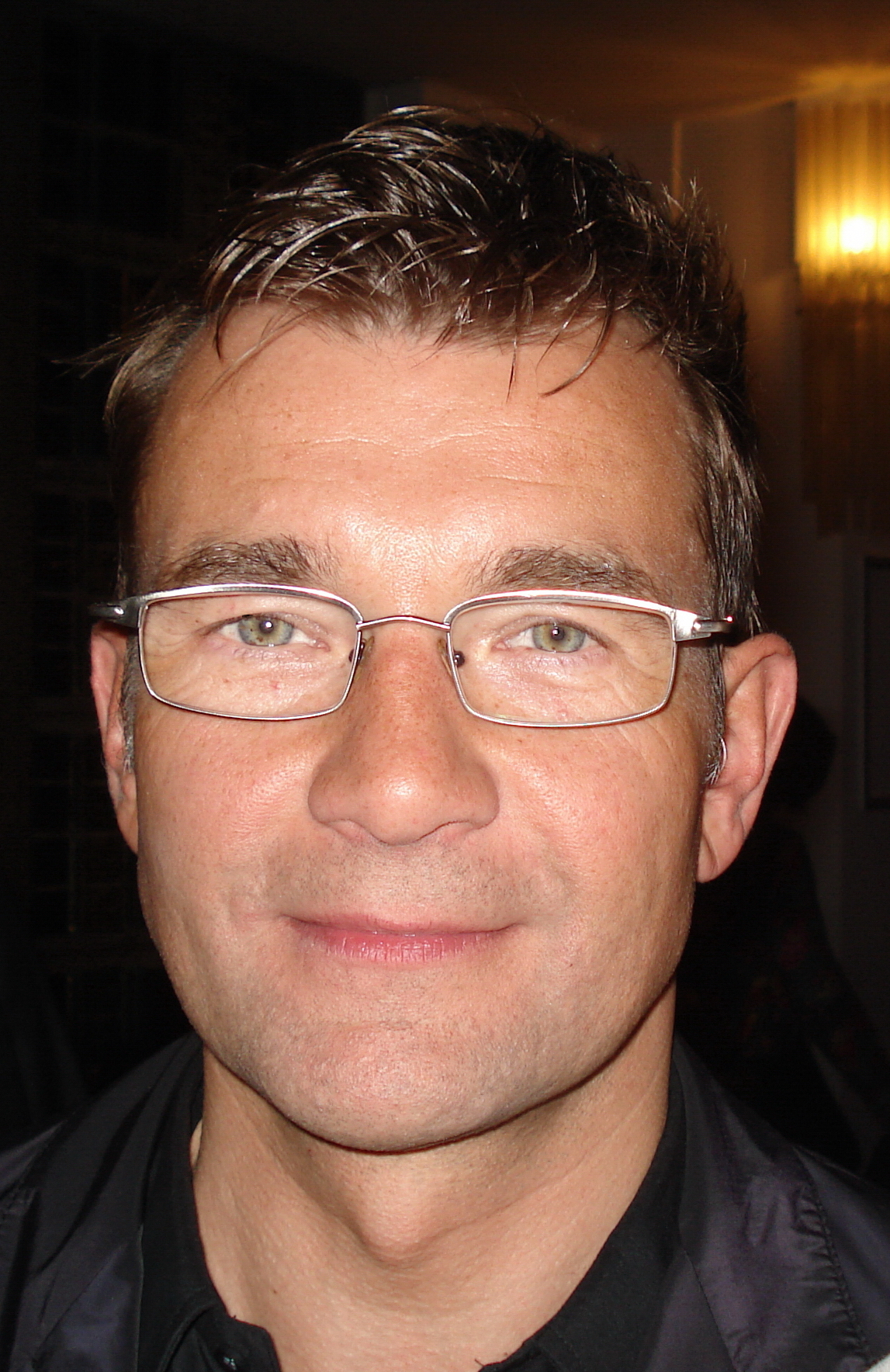
- Born: 25 November 1961 (age 64); Plauen, East Germany
- Occupations: Actor, singer and director
- Years active: 1989-present

Matthias Freihof (born 25 November 1961) is a German television actor and director. He has performed in many TV films and series including police drama Siska for 5 years. but also works on live stage performing as an actor and a singer. He is most known for the 1989 East German film Coming Out. He and the film won prizes in several festivals as best actor and best film as well as 'The Silver Bear' in the Berlin Film Festival 1990.

== Life ==
Freihof was born in Plauen on 25 November 1961. After graduating from high school and completing his three-year military service in the NVA, Freihof then studied at Ernst Busch Academy of Dramatic Arts in Berlin. He made his stage debut at the Maxim Gorki Theater in Berlin between 1983 and 1984 in The Pilot Of the Stars. He then spent two years at the Kleist Theater in Frankfurt (Oder) from 1987 to 1989. His first TV movie role was a student in Die erste Reihe in 1987.

His first DEFA film was "Käthe Kollwitz", where he played the son of Jutta Wachowiak. His second film role, at age 27, was in Coming Out, an LGBT-themed film and one of the last DEFA productions. He played Philip, a teacher realising late in life that he is gay. Freihof himself also came out as gay after the film's release. He had come out as a teenager, but wanted to come out officially and to the public (such as in interviews).

In 1989, he performed in Cabaret Intim at the Berliner Palast der Republik, and then Spass am sein in 1990. From 1992 to 1994, he went on an international tour with the musical program Leidenschaften.

Freihof has also been active as a singer. He released a song titled Tastes Your Life after Chamomile Tea (1989).

From 1996 to 1997, he played teacher Boris Magnus in the ARD series Marienhof. From 1998 to 2003, in 50 episodes, he played the role of "Assistant Lorenz Wigand" to Chief Commissioner Siska in the eponymous ZDF crime series. He had guest appearances in Mona M. – Mit den Waffen einer Frau and Alarm für Cobra 11 – Die Autobahnpolizei, both in 1996, and Der Alte in 1997.

At times he taught as a lecturer at his former drama school, the Ernst Busch and the Berlin School of Drama.

Freihof played Heinrich Himmler, the Reichsführer of the Schutzstaffel (SS) in the movie Valkyrie, about the Stauffenberg assassination (Operation Valkyrie), which reconstructed the assassination of Adolf Hitler on July 20, 1944 and starred Tom Cruise as Stauffenberg. However, his two short scenes were cut from the final theatrical version.

After leaving the TV show Siska, he has mainly worked on the stage. In 2008, he directed a play called "Ganz Kerle", which was performed in the Theater am Kurfürstendamm in Berlin. He also brought Canadian comedy "Whole Guys" by Kerry Renards to the stage. He has directed in Düsseldorf and had a starring role at Berlin's Schlosspark-Theater.

== Personal life ==
Freihof is openly gay and is married with a husband.

== Filmography ==
=== Film ===
Year	Title	Role
1986	Käthe Kollwitz	
1989	Coming Out	Philipp Klarmann
1994	Im Zeichen der Liebe	
1997	Not a Love Song	Karl
2000	Zurück auf Los!	Bastl
2001	Courts mais Gay: Tome 2	(segment "Les 3 souhaits")
2002	Führer Ex	Stasi-Offizier
2008	Valkyrie	Reichsführer Heinrich Himmler
2010	Die Friseuse (The Hairdresser)	Micha
2014	Der Tropfen - Ein Roadmovie	Pfarrer Brhl

=== TV ===
Year	Title	Role	Notes
1987	Die erste Reihe	Student	(TV movie)
1991	Mokka für den Tiger		(TV movie)
1992	Hamburger Gift	Direktionsassistent	(TV movie)
1993	Ein Fall für zwei	Rüdiger Kleinert	TV series, 1 episode
1993	Motzki	Schlosser	TV mini-series, 2 episodes
1994	Die Männer vom K3	Arthur Herford	TV series, 1 episode
1994-2012	SOKO 5113	Georg von Heinemann (2012)/ Siegfried Weisshäupl (2010)/ Michael Grosz (1994 + 2000)	TV series, 4 episodes
1996	Liane	Journalist Ziemer	(TV movie)
1996	SK-Babies	Marc König	TV series, 1 episode
1996	Alarm für Cobra 11 – Die Autobahnpolizei	Jochen Seyfert / Polizeimeister Jochen Seyfert	TV series, 8 episodes
1996	Mona M. – Mit den Waffen einer Frau	Frank	TV series, 1 episode
1996-1997	Marienhof	Boris Magnus	TV series, 2 episodes
1997	Lea Katz – Die Kriminalpsychologin: Einer von uns	Bernd May	(TV movie)
1997	The Old Fox	Ingo Orlak (1997)/ Manfred Kiessling (1997)	TV series, 2 episodes
1997	Parkhotel Stern	Dan Norton	TV series, 1 episode
1997	Death Game	Chefpilot Jürgen Schumann	(TV Movie documentary)
1998-2003	Siska	Lorenz Wiegand	TV series, 50 episodes
2000	Stubbe – Von Fall zu Fall	Gottfried Wilfert	TV series, 1 episode
2000	Für alle Fälle Stefanie	Rainer	TV series, 1 episode
2001	Vera Brühne (or The Trials of Vera B.)	Lawyer Kubalek	(TV movie)
2002	Highspeed – Die Ledercops	Lieutenant Dannert	TV series, 1 episode
2003	Geschlecht weiblich	Dr. Westermann	(TV movie)
2004-2009	In aller Freundschaft	Andreas Reuter (2009)/ Florian Bauer (2004)	TV series, 2 episodes
2004-2010	Tatort	Ernst Heck (2010)/ Röckmann (2004)	TV series, 2 episodes
2006	The Crows	Jasper	(TV movie)
2007	SOKO Rhein-Main	Lucky Schäfer	TV series, 1 episode
2007-2014	Küstenwache	Christian Voss (2014)/ Daniel Hege (2008)/ Bruno Fredersen (2007)	TV series, 3 episodes
2009	SOKO Wismar	Dr. Frank Lindenroth	TV series, 1 episode
2009-2017	Leipzig Homicide	Anwalt Harald Kordes (2017)/ Dr. Grohe (2013)/ Harry Rhese (2009)	TV series, 3 episodes
2009-2015	Notruf Hafenkante	Siegfried Höpfner (2015)/ Dr. Bauer (2009)	TV series, 2 episodes
2011-2013	Stuttgart Homicide	Jürgen Schierle (2013)/ Philip Stark (2011)	TV series, 2 episodes
2012	Nicht mit mir, Liebling	Wachmann Lutz	(TV movie)
2014	Letzte Spur Berlin	Dr. Kirsten	TV series, 1 episode
2014	Sprung ins Leben	Dr. Thomas Hopenberg	(TV movie)
2018	Ihr seid natürlich eingeladen	Standesbeamter	(TV movie)
