= Reunification clause =

The Reunification clause was part of the preamble of the German Constitution. The preamble was in force from 1949 until 1990.

The preamble ended with the sentence:

Das gesamte Deutsche Volk bleibt aufgefordert, in freier Selbstbestimmung die Einheit und Freiheit Deutschlands zu vollenden.
The whole German People remains compelled to fulfill the Unity and Freedom of Germany by virtue of its right to free self-determination.

The jurisprudence of the Federal Constitutional Court of Germany therefrom resulted in a constitutional prerogative, which was binding to all governmental entities, to regain German Unity and work toward achieving this objective.

At the time, an attempt was made by opposition parties to the social-liberal administrative coalition headed by German Chancellor Willy Brandt to block the ratification of the Basic Treaty of 1972. The treaty was negotiated by Brandt's administration to establish good neighborly relations with the German Democratic Republic, while preserving the premise of the reunification clause. This attempt, however, was thwarted by a ruling of the German Supreme Court, which cited the autonomous powers that are constitutionally vested in the political parties regarding how the reunification clause was to be implemented.

== Other Reunification Clauses ==
Reunification clauses can be found in:

- the constitution of the Swiss Cantons Basel-Stadt

A constitutional mandate for state sovereignty, on the other hand, exists for:

- the Swiss Cantons Basel-Land,
- by virtue of Austrian State Treaty of 1955 in the Austria.
