= Medal for Exemplary Border Service =

Medal for Exemplary Border Service Medaille für vorbildlichen Grenzdienst
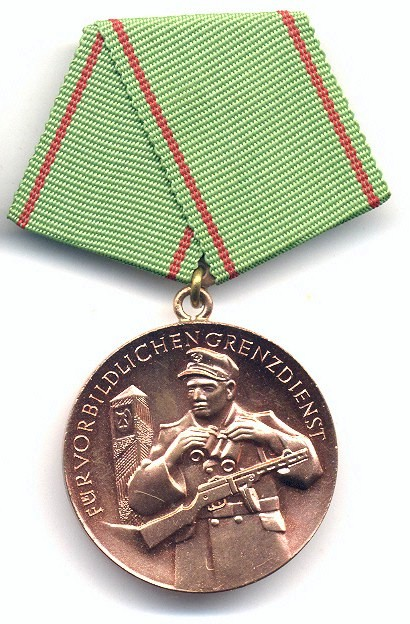
- Medal for Exemplary Border Service - 3rd Type
- Type: Three class order
- Awarded for: "Exemplary performance and personal commitment in securing the state border of the GDR"
- Presented by: East Germany
- Status: No longer awarded
- First award: 28 May 1954
- Final award: 1990
- Ribbon bar

The Medal for Exemplary Border Service (German: Medaille für vorbildlichen Grenzdienst) was a national award issued in the German Democratic Republic (GDR). It was established on 28 May 1954, by the Council of Ministers of the GDR (German: Verordnung der Regierung der DDR) with Order No. 47/54 from the Ministry of Interior on 16 June 1954. The first presentation ceremony took place on 1 July 1954, to members of the German Border Police (German: Deutschen Grenzpolizei (DGP)).

== Award criteria ==
The medal was awarded to members of the Border Troops of the GDR (German: Grenztruppen der DDR) as well as civilians for exemplary performance and personal commitment in securing the state border of the GDR. It recognized outstanding contributions in enhancing the combat readiness and training in the performance of border guard tasks. It could be awarded more than one time.

The award was presented with certificates and payment by the Deputy Minister of National Defense and the Chief of the Border Troops of the GDR. From 1978 to 1988, it was presented on the occasion of the Anniversary of the Border Troops on 1 December. It could also be presented immediately after the accomplished performance, such as the prevention of a break through at the border, even if it resulted in death of the escapee.

The medal was also presented to members of the Stasi. Around 13% of the recipients were graduates of the Stasi's University of the Ministry of State Security (German: Hochschule des Ministeriums für Staatssicherheit (MfS)). The medal issued to Stasi members included a certificate signed by a Stasi official, normally MfS Minister Erich Mielke. There are known examples of this medal being presented to Stasi members in February (MfS anniversary) and June before the official July 1954 DGB ceremony.

== Appearance and method of wear ==
=== First type ===
The first type of this medal was awarded from 1954 to 1955. It is round, bronze colored nonferrous metal 35mm in diameter. On the right and left edge of the obverse are curved, stylized stalks of wheat which terminate with the inscription • D • D • R •. In the center is a raised embossed three-line inscription: (German: “Für Vorbildlichen Grenzdienst”) For Exemplary Border Service. The reverse of the medal has a raised edge with a smooth center which contains with a four-digit award number at the bottom edge. There are known to be 1.5 mm and 2 mm high numbers. The medal was worn on the left upper chest suspended from a woven 36 x 39 mm wide pentagonal shaped ribbon. The ribbon is dark green with two perpendicular 1.5 mm wide red stripes spaced 1.5 mm from each edge of the ribbon. Berlin sculptor Fritz Schulz designed this version of the medal.

=== Second type ===
The second type of this medal was awarded from 1955 to 1956. It is nearly identical to the first, but has no award number on the reverse and the ribbon is a lighter green.

=== Third type ===
The third type of this medal was worn from 1956 to 1990. It is round, bronze colored ferrous metal 35mm in diameter. The design was changed, on the obverse in the center of the medal is a 1950s border guard holding binoculars in his hands and a machine gun slung across his chest. Behind him and to the left is an East German border marker. Near the top rim is a semicircular inscription: (German: “Für Vorbildlichen Grenzdienst”) “For Exemplary Border Service”. The reverse of the medal displays the coat of arms of the GDR. This version of the medal is not numbered on the reverse. This medal was worn on the left upper chest suspended from a woven 21mm wide pentagonal shaped 46 x 35mm ribbon. The Ribbon was initially dark green later changed to lighter green shade with two perpendicular 1 mm wide red stripes spaced 1.5 mm from each edge of the ribbon. Berlin sculptor Fritz Schulz also designed this medal.

=== Proposed changes ===
In 1976 the head of the GDR Border Guard (German: Chef der Grenztruppen der DDR) proposed to create a new style of medal since the design on the obverse showed an out of date border policeman with an obsolete machine gun. He suggested that the revised medal be presented on the occasion of the 30th Anniversary of the Border Troops of the GDR. The graphic artist Hans Räde proposed four different designs. Minister of National Defense, Army General Hoffmann, rejected all of these proposals. He felt the subject of the medal was a symbol which provided a historical link to progressive traditions at the time of the foundation of the Border Guards.

== See also ==
- Awards and decorations of East Germany
- National People's Army
