= Rudolf Klimmer =

- Born: 17 May 1905; Dresden, Saxony, German Empire
- Died: 26 July 1977 (aged 72); Wuppertal, North Rhine-Westphalia, West Germany
- Education: University of Leipzig
- Occupations: Psychologist, sexologist
- Known for: gay rights activism
- Notable work: Die Homosexualität als biologisch-soziologische Zeitfrage (Hamburg 1965)
- Political party: KPD (1926-45); SED (1946-77)

External image
- Portrait photograph of Rudolf Klimmer as a ship's doctor in 1932

Rudolf Klimmer (17 May 1905 – 26 July 1977) was a German psychologist and sexologist who was an early gay activist, most notable for his work in the German Democratic Republic.

== Biography ==
Klimmer was the son of renowned veterinary professor Martin Klimmer, and attended medical school at the University of Leipzig. In 1926, he joined the Communist Party of Germany while continuing his studies, and he earned his doctorate in 1930. His career was cut temporarily short when the Nazis rose to power in the early 1930s, and he worked for a time as a ship's doctor for the Hamburg America Line in the Americas and Asia. He returned to Germany in 1934 and became the senior physician at the Bethel Institution in Bielefeld. Due to his political affiliations, however, he was jailed twice by the Nazi regime in 1938 and 1941, for sentences of five months and a year, respectively, and was banned from medical practice. Nonetheless, he continued to perform medical research for Schering AG throughout the duration of the war. He married a lesbian in the 1930s to avoid the persecution of gay people in Nazi Germany.

After the war, Klimmer opened up a psychiatric practice in Leipzig, and joined the Socialist Unity Party, the ruling party of the newly formed East Germany. Using his political ties, he attempted multiple times to repeal Paragraph 175 from the criminal code, which prohibited homosexuality. In 1954 Klimmer personally asked Walter Ulbricht, the First Secretary of the Socialist Unity Party of Germany, to decriminalize homosexuality and repeal Paragraph 175, to no avail. He became director of a sexual health institute and formed a committee to lobby in the Volkskammer. In the late 1950s and early 1960s he wrote pro-gay works, but had to publish them in Hamburg due to publishing restrictions in the East. Thanks to his tireless work, no more convictions were made in the East under Paragraph 175 after 1950, and his efforts, along with those of Kurt Freund, pushed the GDR to fully abolish paragraph 175 in 1968, a year before West Germany decriminalised homosexuality, and 26 years before reunified Germany abolished paragraph 175. Klimmer corresponded with Freund in form the late 1950s to the early 1960s, they also occasionally attended the same conferences. Kilmmer sent his book to Freund. Freund invited Klimmer to Hradec Králové to talk on the legal situation of homosexuality ‘in the people’s democracies and the Soviet Union’

Klimmer died in Wuppertal in 1977, while visiting relatives in West Germany.

== See also ==
- LGBTQ rights in the German Democratic Republic
