= Reisebüro der DDR =

The Reisebüro der DDR ("Travel Bureau of the GDR") was the state travel organization of the German Democratic Republic (East Germany). The Reisebüro had several travel-related functions, including:

1. Arranging domestic travel for GDR citizens. The Reisebüro (Travel Agency), among other things, controlled hotels located throughout the GDR.
2. Arranging travel for GDR citizens in other socialist countries, i.e., the Soviet Union, Czechoslovakia, Poland, Hungary, Romania, Bulgaria, and Cuba.
3. Arranging travel for foreigners visiting the GDR. These services included booking hotel rooms and providing confirmation documents used to justify the issuance of a GDR visa upon arrival in the GDR. The Reisebüro had agreements with travel agencies in other countries; travelers would book trips with a participating travel agency in their home country, which would then coordinate with the Reisebüro to reserve hotel rooms, etc.

== See also ==
- Intourist
- Tourism in East Germany
