= Exclusive mandate =

Government assertion of authority over uncontrolled territory

An exclusive mandate is a government's assertion of its legitimate authority over a certain territory, part of which another government controls with stable, de facto sovereignty. It is also known as a claim to sole representation or an exclusive authority claim. The concept was particularly important during the Cold War period when a number of states were divided on ideological grounds.

== Modern-day examples ==
=== Chin ===
Map showing the de jure territorial claims of the ROC and the PRC.

The Republic of China (ROC) was established in mainland China in 1912 following the conclusion of the 1911 Revolution which led to the collapse of the Qing dynasty. In 1927, the Chinese Civil War broke out between the Kuomintang-led Nationalist government and the Chinese Communist Party (CCP).

Since 1949–1950, the de facto territories of the ROC are limited to the Taiwan Area which includes the main island of Taiwan and Penghu (acquired by the ROC from Japan in 1945 at the conclusion of hostiles in World War II) along with several other islands. Meanwhile, the People's Republic of China (PRC), established in 1949 by the CCP, controls mainland China, Hong Kong (since 1997) and Macau (since 1999). Officially, both the ROC and the PRC claim de jure sovereignty over all of China (including Taiwan to which the ownership of sovereignty is disputed), and regard the other government as illegitimate. Japan formally severed the claim to Taiwan and Penghu islands upon the signing of the Treaty of San Francisco in April 1952, which has left the status of Taiwan undetermined.

Until 1971, the ROC was the representative of member state "China" at the United Nations (UN) in which "China" is a permanent member of the UN Security Council with veto power. In 1971, the PRC replaced the ROC as the representative of "China" at the UN. Since 1972, the ROC has been excluded from all UN subcommittees. After the UN switched recognition from the ROC to the PRC, many states followed suit. At present, the ROC maintains official diplomatic relations with 12 UN member states and the Holy See; many other states maintain unofficial relations with the ROC. The UN formally designates ROC-held territories as "Taiwan, Province of China".

The ROC currently participates in numerous international events and organizations under the name "Chinese Taipei" while the World Trade Organization officially refers to ROC-controlled territories as the "Separate Customs Territory of Taiwan, Penghu, Kinmen and Matsu".

However, the ROC continued its claim of being the sole legitimate government of China and its territory until 1991 when it ceased to label the Communist Party as a rebellious group and recognized its jurisdiction over mainland China. From that point on, the claims had been softened with the rise of Taiwanese nationalism and the Taiwan independence movement. The ROC's claim of sovereignty over territories under the control of the PRC is not actively pursued under the pro-independence Democratic Progressive Party-led government.

=== Korea ===
When North Korea and South Korea were created within months of each other in 1948, both claimed sovereignty over the entire Korean peninsula. Both states claimed that the other was an unlawfully constituted puppet state of the United States and the Soviet Union, respectively. In 1991, however, both countries joined the UN, as part of their reconciliation policy. By 2024, the North formally abandoned the peaceful reunification while the South maintains the exclusive mandate.

=== Yemen ===
Yemen is governed by two regimes claiming to be the sole legitimate government of the Yemeni state amidst the ongoing civil war: The current government led by president Abdrabbuh Mansur Hadi which is currently recognized by Saudi Arabia, the United States and the United Nations and the Supreme Political Council led by the Houthi movement in Sana'a is recognized by Iran and a few countries.

The Southern Transitional Council, formed in 2017, dissolved in 2026, sought the restoration of the former South Yemeni state that was unified with North Yemen in 1990. The group was supported by the United Arab Emirates.

== Historical examples ==
=== Afghanistan ===
From 1996 to 2001, the Taliban controlled two-thirds of Afghanistan during the conflict against the Northern Alliance. After the overthrow in 2001, the new Afghan government re-established control of the country though the Taliban retained parts of it.

Following the American withdrawal and subsequent recapture of Kabul twenty years later, the Taliban re-established control in Afghanistan as a theocratic emirate, though the Islamic Republic of Afghanistan remains internationally recognized.

=== Germany ===
For nearly all of the 41 years that Germany was split into two countries, the Federal Republic of Germany (West Germany) claimed to be the sole legitimate successor to the German Reich that existed from 1871 to 1945. To that end, West Germany claimed Berlin, capital of Germany from 1871 to 1945, as its capital, with the provisional capital in Bonn.

In a statement made before the Bundestag, German Chancellor Konrad Adenauer asserted this mandate as early as October 21, 1949, in response to the constitution of the German Democratic Republic (GDR) coming into effect. The Secretary of State Summit of the three western powers on September 18, 1950 in New York City, supported Chancellor Adenauer's claim.

When the Soviet Union proclaimed the sovereignty of the GDR, the West German Bundestag once again unanimously insisted that the Federal Republic was the sole legitimate representative of the German people. At the Treaties of Paris (Pariser Verträge), at which the Federal Republic of Germany was admitted into the North Atlantic Treaty Organization, the allied nations adopted the position which the three western allies had already confirmed at the Nine-Power Conference in London: that the Federal Republic had the exclusive right to act on behalf of the entire German people in matters of foreign policy. The western nations thereby recognized the Federal Republic as the only lawful government for Germany as a whole.

Aside from such considerations pertaining to international law, the reunification clause of the Basic Law suggested that international recognition of the German Democratic Republic was to be avoided, so as not to sever the constitutional mandate to a unified German state.

Until 1973, the Federal Republic took a strict line in claiming an exclusive mandate for all of Germany. Under the Hallstein Doctrine, the Federal Republic broke diplomatic relations with states that maintained diplomatic relations with the GDR, except for the Soviet Union. On different levels, such as in international sports, there were, however, a wide range of international cooperations which even led to unified German teams in six Olympic Games (three Winter and three Summer Games). Over time, especially after the election of a social-liberal coalition led by Willy Brandt in 1969, the exclusive mandate was softened, as it severely limited the Federal Republic's domestic and international autonomy. Starting in 1973, under the Ostpolitik policy, the Federal Republic took the line that the Democratic Republic was, de jure, a state within a single German nation which could also function legally within international law as a sovereign state, while reasserting that the Federal Republic was itself the sole legitimate representative of a continuing German Reich that remained otherwise without institutional organisation; thereby relinquishing any claim to be de jure the government of Germany as a whole outside of its own boundaries until such time as the two German states might be reunified.

Judicially, an exclusive mandate arose from the proposition that the German state as a whole had been preserved from 1945 onward, and that only one German state could legitimately exist. The Federal Republic claimed to be that one German state, and regarded the German Democratic Republic as an illegally constituted Soviet puppet state occupying territory that rightfully belonged to the Federal Republic, thus lacking autonomy. An alternate view held that the GDR was in a state of civil war with the FRG government, and therefore could not be recognized as a state under international law. A third, the so-called "umbrella state" theory, entails the existence of two fragment states under the umbrella of a single German nation that had been formed in 1871 and which had never actually been annihilated; this theory arose in the late 1960s and was maintained in a ruling of the Federal Constitutional Court of Germany of 31 July 1973 upholding the "Basic Treaty" by which relations between East and West Germany were normalised. Crucially, although the Constitutional Court reaffirmed the proposition that the pre-1945 German state had been preserved and organised, albeit partially, solely in the institutions of the Federal Republic, the Justices explicitly rejected the proposition that this would imply an exclusive mandate; "...identity does not require exclusivity".

With the admission of both German states to the United Nations in 1973, matters regarding the exclusive mandate were no longer relevant. Nevertheless, the Constitutional Court maintained that the Federal Republic continued to bear a responsibility for the whole German people; albeit that this responsibility could only be discharged in respect of Germans physically present in its territory or within its jurisdiction. Accordingly, the Federal Republic of Germany did not recognize a distinct citizenship for the German Democratic Republic; if East Germans presented themselves in West Germany, or at a West German embassy in a third country, they could obtain a West German passport. Generally, the Federal Republic considered East Germans to be German citizens under the old 1871–1945 all-German citizenship (i.e. Bundesbürger, citizens of West Germany). Refugees who fled from the GDR were therefore not deported, and automatically qualified for West German citizenship.

In addition, visitors from the GDR would receive a West German passport upon request, for example, in order to ease travel to the United States. After the fall of the Berlin wall in November 1989, East Germans were greeted with Begrüßungsgeld (100 West German Deutsche Mark) and could travel freely within West Germany, while West German access to the East was still hindered for some weeks by visa and the Mindestumtausch mandatory minimum exchange of 25 DM.

=== Syria ===
A similar situation occurred at the start of the Syrian Civil War in March 2011 when two governments claimed sovereignty over the whole Syria: The Ba'athist Syrian government headed by Bashar al-Assad and the various opposition groups seeking to remove Assad consisting of the National Coalition for Syrian Revolutionary and Opposition Forces, the Syrian National Council and the Syrian Interim Government. Both entities are considered puppet entities backed by the Russian Federation/Iran and the United States/Saudi Arabia.

In addition, the Islamic State of Iraq and the Levant (ISIS/ISIL), a Sunni Islamist fundamentalist militant group, controlled part of the Syrian territory along with portions of neighbouring Iraq. In a more ambiguous situation, the Kurdish territory of northeast Syria became controlled by the Syrian Kurdish federal state Rojava when Syrian government forces left the area, or areas were liberated from ISIL occupation. Since the end of the Six-Day War in 1967, Israel has occupied the Golan Heights in southwestern Syria, only to de facto annex it in 1981.

Eventually, the Syrian rebel groups took control of the country by early December 2024, causing the Assad regime to crumble.

=== Vietnam ===
The Democratic Republic of Vietnam was proclaimed in 1945; the Republic of Vietnam gained its independence from France in 1954 and France also recognized the Democratic Republic of Vietnam in 1954 while Vietnam was divided in the same year. While elections were intended to be held in 1955 to reunite the country, they never took place. For the next 20 years, both staked claims to all of Vietnam, claiming that the other was an illegally constituted puppet state. This continued until the capital of South Vietnam was captured by the pro-North Vietnamese government in its civil war on 30 April 1975. Vietnam was reunited under the communist regime of the North in 1976.

When some European countries (such as Switzerland) started recognizing North Vietnam towards the end of the Vietnam war, South Vietnam did not interrupt its diplomatic relations with them. Switzerland thus recognized North Vietnam in 1971 but also turned its consulate in Saigon (South Vietnam) into an embassy until the end of the war in 1975.

In 1979, Vietnam invaded and occupied Cambodia (at that time was ruled by the Khmer Rouge as Democratic Kampuchea) establishing the People's Republic of Kampuchea, but it was dismissed by the People's Republic of China as a "puppet state". At the time, both of the countries had disputed the claims of being the sole legitimate representative of all the Khmer people of Cambodia in the United Nations. This resulted in its seat being retained by the Coalition Government of Democratic Kampuchea, a coalition government formed in 1982 as a government in exile and composed of the royalist FUNCINPEC party, the republican Khmer People's National Liberation Front and the Khmer Rouge-backed Party of Democratic Kampuchea.

== See also ==
- Irredentism
- Hallstein Doctrine
- List of states with limited recognition
- List of historical unrecognized countries
- Post-Soviet conflicts
- Rival government
