= Extended Secondary School (East Germany) =

Institution of higher education in the GDR

The extended secondary school, officially twelve-class general educational polytechnic secondary school, abbreviation EOS, was the standard institution of higher education in the education system of East Germany. It finished with the final examination called Reifeprüfung /Abitur (A-Level) at the end of the 12th grade, granting the Reifezeugnis, the certificate of eligibility for university entrance. The school structure was a four-class comprehensive school without any internal or external differentiation. The EOS was established in 1959 to replace the hitherto existing Oberschule as laid down by the Act on Socialistic Development of the School System in the German Democratic Republic effective December 2, 1959. The designation Gymnasium was not common in East Germany.

== Tables of lessons ==
The Ministry of Education determined a table of lessons (Stundentafel) which was mandatory for all extended secondary schools. Like for the Polytechnic Secondary Schools there was one uniform, systemic curriculum, also mandatory for all extended secondary schools. One lesson lasted 45 minutes and students went to school six days a week, from Monday to Saturday. On Saturdays, there were approximately five to six lessons.

=== Transitory table of lessons 1959 ===
This table of lessons was effective until the reform of the existing Oberschule was finished and the newly established extended secondary schools were fully operational under the altered conditions.

Lesson
| Lesson | Grade | | | | | | | | | | | |
| Lesson | A-branch | | | | B-branch | | | | C-branch | | | |
| Lesson | 9 | 10 | 11 | 12 | 9 | 10 | 11 | 12 | 9 | 10 | 11 | 12 |
Compulsory teaching
| German language and literature | 5 | 4 | 4 | 4 | 5 | 4 | 4 | 4 | 5 | 4 | 4 | 3 |
| Russian language | 3 | 3 | 3 | 3 | 3 | 3 | 3 | 3 | 3 | 3 | 3 | 3 |
| 2nd foreign language | 5 | 4 | 5 | 4 | 2 | 3 | 3 | 3 | 6 | 4 | 4 | 4 |
| 3rd foreign language | − | 4 | 4 | 4 | − | − | − | − | − | 4 | 8 | 7 |
| Mathematics | 3 | 3 | 3 | 3 | 5 | 4 | 6 | 5 | 3 | 3 | 3 | 3 |
| Physics | 2 | 2 | 2 | 2 | 3 | 3 | 3 | 3 | 2 | 2 | 2 | 2 |
| Chemistry | 1 | 1 | 1 | 2 | 2 | 3 | 3 | 3 | 1 | 1 | 1 | 2 |
| Biology | 2 | 2 | 2 | 2 | 2 | 2 | 3 | 3 | 2 | 2 | 2 | 2 |
| Geography | 2 | 2 | 1 | 1 | 2 | 2 | 1 | 1 | 2 | 2 | – | − |
| Astronomy | − | − | − | − | − | − | − | − | − | − | – | − |
| Technical drawing | 1 | 1 | – | – | 1 | 1 | – | – | 1 | 1 | – | − |
| Technical studies and productive work | 4 | 4 | 4 | 4 | 4 | 4 | 4 | 4 | 4 | 4 | 4 | 4 |
| History | 2 | 2 | 2 | 3 | 2 | 2 | 2 | 3 | 2 | 2 | 2 | 3 |
| Politics | 1 | 1 | 1 | 1 | 1 | 1 | 1 | 1 | 1 | 1 | 1 | 1 |
| Arts | 1 | 1 | 1 | 1 | 1 | 1 | 1 | 1 | 1 | 1 | 1 | 1 |
| Music | 1 | 1 | 1 | 1 | 1 | 1 | 1 | 1 | 1 | 1 | 1 | 1 |
| Physical education | 2 | 2 | 2 | 2 | 2 | 2 | 2 | 2 | 2 | 2 | 2 | 2 |
| Sum of compulsory lessons | 35 | 37 | 36 | 37 | 36 | 36 | 37 | 37 | 36 | 37 | 38 | 38 |
| Elective teaching | − | − | − | − | − | − | − | − | − | − | − | − |

=== Standard table of lessons 1961 ===
Compulsory teaching had to follow this standard table of lessons when the transformation process was finished and all requirements could be met by the school, for instance, the number of teachers, number of educators, teaching equipment and so forth.

Lesson
| Lesson | Grade | | | | | | | | | | | |
| Lesson | A-branch | | | | B-branch | | | | C-branch | | | |
| Lesson | 9 | 10 | 11 | 12 | 9 | 10 | 11 | 12 | 9 | 10 | 11 | 12 |
Compulsory teaching
| German language and literature | 4 | 4 | 4 | 4 | 4 | 4 | 4 | 4 | 5 | 4 | 3 | 4 |
| Russian language | 5 | 3 | 3 | 3 | 3 | 3 | 3 | 3 | 3 | 3 | 3 | 3 |
| 2nd foreign language | 5 | 4 | 4 | 4 | 3 | 3 | 3 | 3 | 6 | 4 | 4 | 4 |
| 3rd foreign language | − | 4 | 5 | 5 | − | − | − | − | − | 6 | 6 | 7 |
| Mathematics | 3 | 3 | 3 | 3 | 5 | 5 | 5 | 4 | 3 | 3 | 3 | 3 |
| Physics | 2 | 2 | 2 | 1 | 3 | 3 | 3 | 3 | 2 | 2 | 2 | 1 |
| Chemistry | 2 | 2 | 2 | 1 | 2 | 3 | 3 | 3 | 2 | 1 | 2 | 1 |
| Biology | 1 | 1 | 1 | 2 | 2 | 2 | 3 | 2 | 2 | 1 | 1 | − |
| Geography | 2 | 1 | 1 | − | 2 | 2 | 1 | 1 | 2 | 1 | 1 | − |
| Astronomy | − | − | − | 1 | − | − | − | 1 | − | − | – | 1 |
| Technical drawing | 1 | 1 | – | – | 1 | 1 | – | – | 1 | 1 | – | − |
| Technical studies and productive work | 4 | 4 | 4 | 4 | 4 | 4 | 4 | 4 | 3 | 3 | 4 | 4 |
| History | 2 | 2 | 2 | 3 | 2 | 2 | 2 | 3 | 2 | 2 | 2 | 3 |
| Politics | 1 | 1 | 1 | 1 | 1 | 1 | 1 | 1 | 1 | 1 | 1 | 1 |
| Arts | 1 | 1 | 1 | 1 | 1 | 1 | 1 | 1 | 1 | 1 | 1 | 1 |
| Music | 1 | 1 | 1 | 1 | 1 | 1 | 1 | 1 | 1 | 1 | 1 | 1 |
| Physical education | 2 | 2 | 2 | 2 | 2 | 2 | 2 | 2 | 2 | 2 | 2 | 2 |
| Sum of compulsory lessons | 36 | 36 | 36 | 36 | 36 | 36 | 36 | 36 | 36 | 36 | 36 | 36 |
| Elective teaching | − | − | − | − | − | − | − | − | − | − | − | − |

=== Standard table of lessons 1982 ===
Starting in 1982 EOS incorporated 11th and 12th grade only.
