= Die andere Liebe =

1988 educational film

- Directed by: Axel Otten; Helmut Kißling
- Production company: DEFA film studios
- Release date: 2 November 1988
- Running time: 34 minutes
- Country: East Germany
- Language: German

Die andere Liebe (English: The Other Love) is a 1988 East German public education documentary film directed by Axel Otten and Helmut Kißling. It is 34 minutes long and in German with English subtitles. It was the first film produced by East Germany's state-run DEFA film studios that dealt with the subject of homosexuality. It was commissioned by the German Hygiene Museum in Dresden. It was made in co-operation with gay and lesbian activists in East Germany and includes interviews with lesbians and gay men talking about their lives. The film was aiming to convey official state acceptance of homosexuality.

Initially it was jointly directed by Otten and Kißling, but during production Kißling fled to the west leaving Otten to finish the film.

Die andere Liebe premiered on 2 November 1988 at the Kino Babylon in Berlin.

DEFA's only feature film dealing with gay themes, Coming Out, premiered a year later, on 9 November 1989 at the Kino International. The actor Dirk Kummer, who played 'Matthias' in Coming Out, appears in Die andere Liebe being interviewed with his boyfriend.

== Synopsis ==
Die andere Liebe aims to promote understanding and tolerance in the heterosexual community via interviews with gay men and lesbians. It states that there were an estimated three quarters of a million gay and lesbian people in the GDR, which at that time had a total population of about 16.5 million. It talks about the vulnerability of gay and lesbian people and the prejudice against them, including violent attacks. Workplace problems are discussed. Young gay and lesbian people discuss the process of coming out and the emotional problems they experienced as they learned to accept their sexual identity. A mother talks about how she learned to accept her gay son by becoming better informed about homosexuality. The desire for long term personal relationships beyond casual contact in gay venues is examined.

== See also ==
- Liebe ohne Angst (1989 film)
