= Coming Out (1989 film) =

- German theatrical release poster
- Directed by: Heiner Carow
- Written by: Wolfram Witt
- Produced by: Horst Hartwig
- Starring: Matthias Freihof; Dirk Kummer; Dagmar Manzel
- Cinematography: Martin Schlesinger
- Edited by: Evelyn Carow
- Music by: Stefan Carow
- Distributed by: DEFA
- Release date: 9 November 1989
- Running time: 113 minutes
- Country: East Germany
- Language: German (English subtitles)

Coming Out is a 1989 East German film directed by Heiner Carow and written by Wolfram Witt which deals with the lead character, a high school teacher, "coming out" and accepting himself as gay. It was the last East German film released to the public prior to the German reunification and one of the last films made by DEFA, the East German state film studio, and the only gay-themed feature film that it made.

The film premiered at the Kino International in Berlin on 9 November 1989, the night that the Berlin Wall was opened.

It won a number of awards including a Silver Bear and Teddy Award at 40th Berlin International Film Festival, and awards at the National Feature Film Festival of the GDR.

The lead actors are Matthias Freihof, Dagmar Manzel, and Dirk Kummer. The film was shot on location in East Berlin and includes scenes shot with amateurs in some of the gay venues of the time. The East German transgender activist Charlotte von Mahlsdorf played a cameo role as a barmaid.

== Plot ==
The story revolves around a young high-school teacher, Philipp Klarmann, who during his first day at work collides with a fellow teacher, Tanja, in a school corridor. Philipp ensures Tanja is okay and later takes her out for a drink. A romance quickly develops and they become engaged to be married.

It later becomes clear that Philipp is conflicted about his sexuality. He demonstrates empathy with a discriminated minority by defending a black man who is being bullied on a train. Jakob, an out gay friend of Tanja's, comes to visit. Unknown to her, he and Philipp have had a previous relationship as teens that didn't end well.

Philipp later visits a gay bar, where a party is taking place. Most patrons are in costume and many are in drag. Philipp is cautious, but allows himself to be led to a seat near an older male character. The bartender senses his hesitation in this setting and says, "There's no need to be scared. Everyone started this way. Be brave."

A young man, Matthias, watches Philipp from a distance. They later meet up, have an evening out together and have sex and fall in love.

Philipp's relationship with Tanja deteriorates and he struggles with his identity. His mother indicates that she realises he is gay and that she disapproves.

Philipp is eventually forced to come out to Tanja, after she inadvertently meets Mathias during intermission at a concert by the famous conductor Daniel Barenboim that all three are attending. Matthias is distraught when he learns that Philipp has a fiancée and runs out of the concert hall in distress.

Over the next few weeks, Philipp searches for Matthias and also goes cruising for sex; he meets up with a man and has casual sex, an experience which he enjoys but it perplexes him when the man casually leaves afterwards. He eventually finds Mathias at a bar with another young man, who is one of the pupils Phillipp teaches. Matthias rejects Philipp and Philipp goes away upset and returns to the gay bar where the two originally met. The old man Philipp first met in the bar is there again and he tells him the story of how he was forced to separate from his lover during the Nazi period. He concludes his story by saying "everyone is alone ... everyone is afraid."

The film ends with a classroom scene, in which the head teacher, who has apparently discovered Philipp's sexual orientation, comes to do a sham classroom observation, theoretically to see if he is suitable to teach. Philipp sits on his desk saying and doing nothing, prompting the head teacher to yell 'Kollege Klarmann!' to which Philipp simply replies 'Ja', signifying his acceptance of his sexual orientation.

== Cast ==
- Matthias Freihof as Philipp Klarmann
- Dagmar Manzel as Tanja
- Dirk Kummer as Matthias
- Michael Gwisdek as Achim
- Werner Dissel as Older homosexual man
- Gudrun Ritter as Frau Moellemann, Waitress
- Walfriede Schmitt as Philipp's mother
- Axel Wandtke as Jakob
- Charlotte von Mahlsdorf as the Barmaid
- Pierre Bliss as Araber
- René Schmidt as Young man in the park
- Thomas Gumpert as Larry
- Ursula Staack as Wanton
- Robert Hummel as Lutz
- Horst Ziethen as Lanky boy

== Production ==
The opening scene follows an ambulance through well-known areas and boroughs such as Prenzlauer Berg, Berlin-Mitte (Alexander Platz) and Friedrichshain on a night that the audience could assume is New Year's Eve, due to the fireworks in the background. Other scenes in the movie are filmed on locations that were common meeting points for homosexuals in East Germany such as the Fairytale Fountain (Märchenbrunnen) in Volkspark Friedrichshain and bars such as Schoppenstube in Prenzlauer Berg and Zum Burgfrieden which was located at Wichertstraße 69, though it was closed in January 2000.

Scenes filmed in the school where Philipp teaches were filmed in the Carl-von-Ossietzky-Gymnasium, a historical building and school in Pankow and some halls were used in a few scenes.

The family of Lothar Bisky allowed scenes which took place in Tanja's apartment to be filmed in their Berlin home. Bisky was the director of the University of Film and Television (Potsdam-Babelsberg) from 1986 to 1990 and later, in the reunified Germany, he became a left wing politician. Two of his three sons are gay, one of whom is Berlin-based painter Norbert Bisky.

== Awards ==
The film has been shown at film festivals around the world and has won a number of awards, including:

- 1990 40th Berlin International Film Festival (Berlinale) - Silver Bear for 'outstanding artistic contribution', for its 'expression of respect for human rights, humanity, and tolerance'. Teddy Award, an award for the best LGBT films at the Berlinale.
- 1990 Akademie der Künste Berlin (Academy of Arts, Berlin) - Konrad Wolf Prize for director Heiner Carow and author Wolfram Witt.
- 1990 Nationales Spielfilmfestival der DDR (National Feature Film Festival of the GDR) - Best Director (Heiner Carow); Best Young Male Actor (Matthias Freihof).

== See also ==
- Die andere Liebe
- LGBT rights in the German Democratic Republic
