= German Hygiene Museum =

Museum in Dresden

Coordinates: 51°2′39″N 13°44′48″E

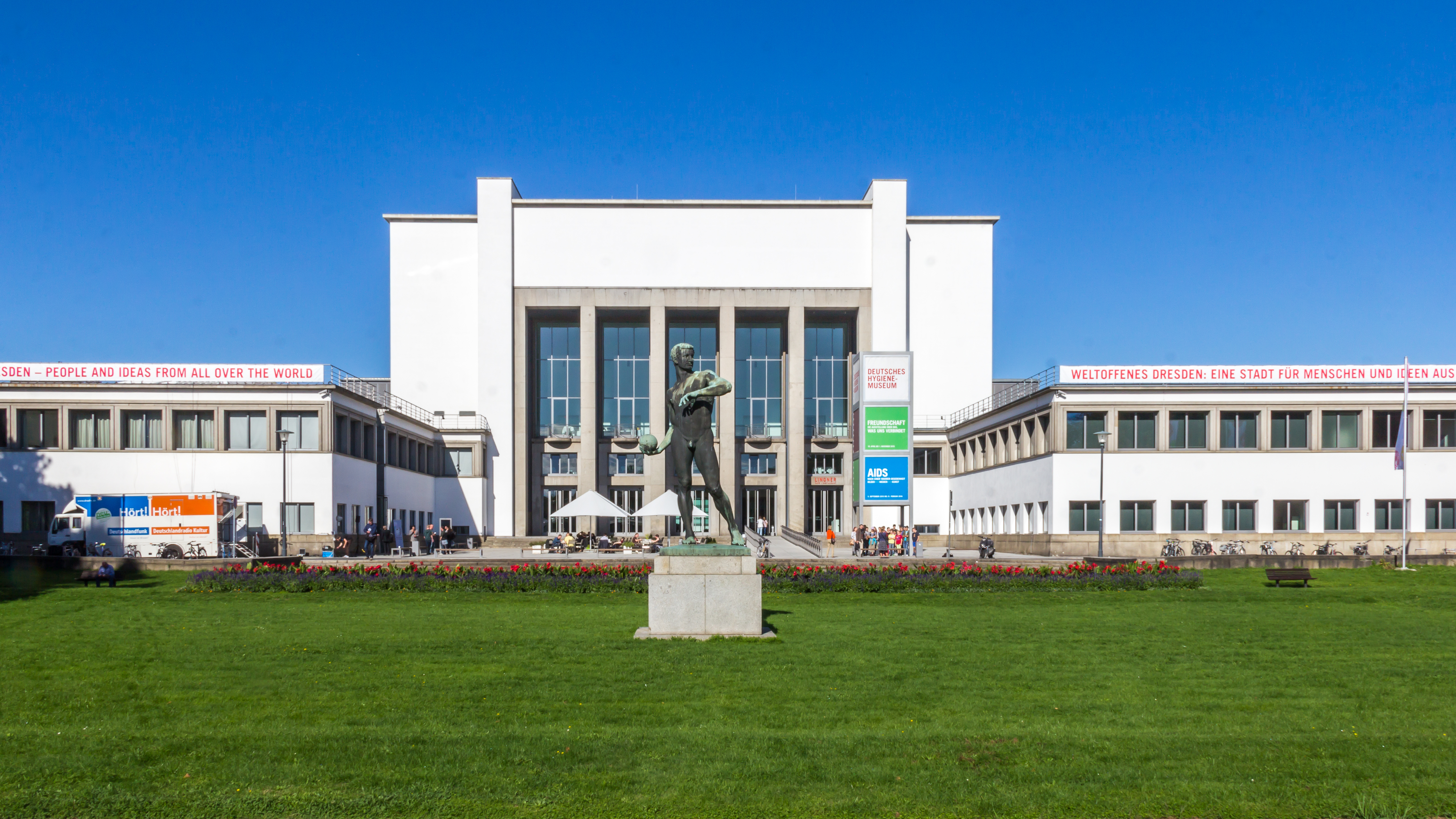
- Entrance area
- Established: 1912
- Location: Lingnerplatz 1; 01069 Dresden, Germany
- Type: Medicine, health promotion
- Visitors: 280,000
- Website: German Hygiene Museum

The German Hygiene Museum (German: Deutsches Hygiene-Museum) is a medical museum in Dresden, Germany. It conceives itself today as a "forum for science, culture and society". It is a popular venue for events and exhibitions, and is among the most visited museums in Dresden, with around 280,000 visitors per year.

== History ==
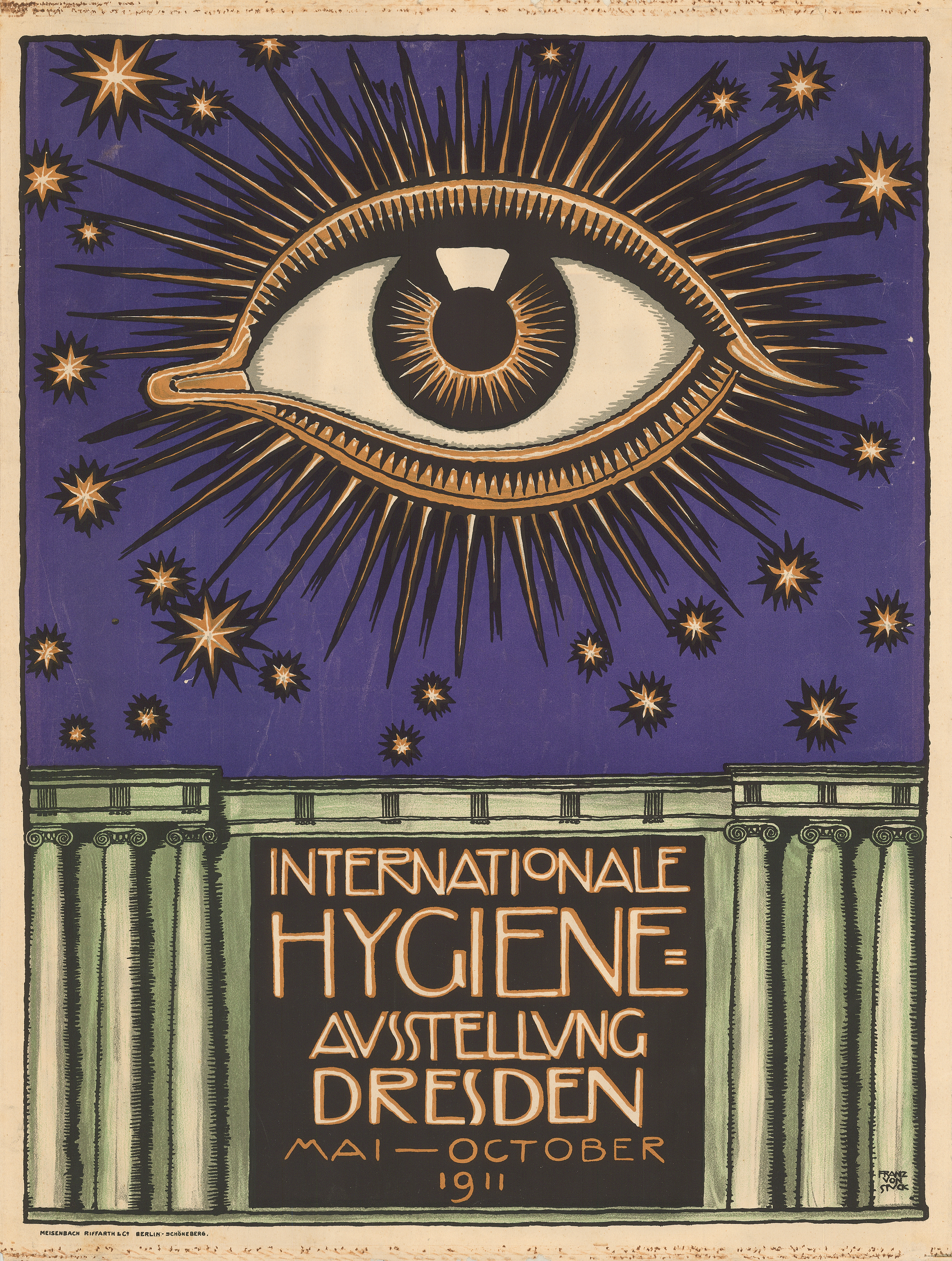
Poster for the Dresden International Hygiene Exhibition 1911, by Franz Stuck

The museum was founded in 1912 by Karl August Lingner, a Dresden businessman and manufacturer of hygiene products, as a permanent "public venue for healthcare education", following the first International Hygiene Exhibition in 1911.

The second International Hygiene Exhibition was held in 1930-31, in a building erected west of the Großer Garten park according to plans designed by Wilhelm Kreis, which became the museum's permanent home. One of the biggest attractions was, and remains, a transparent model of a human being, the Gläserner Mensch or Transparent Man, of which many copies have subsequently been made for other museums.

During the Third Reich the museum came under the influence of the Nazis, who used it to produce material propagandising their racial ideology and promoting eugenics. Various Nazi government offices relocated to the museum between 1933 and 1941, and the German Labour Front's Reichsberufswettkampf (National Vocational Competition) was held there in 1944. Large parts of the building and collection were destroyed by the bombing of Dresden in 1945.

In the East German period the museum resumed its role as a communicator of public health information. It produced a wide range of educational material, including short films on subjects such as smoking, breastfeeding, sexually transmitted diseases and teenage pregnancy. In 1988 the museum, working in co-operation with East German gay and lesbian activists, commissioned DEFA film studios to make the documentary film Die andere Liebe (English:The Other Love), the first East German film that dealt with the subject of homosexuality. The museum also commissioned the only HIV/AIDS prevention documentary produced in the GDR, Liebe ohne Angst (Love without fear) in 1989.

Following German reunification the museum was reconceived and modernised, starting in 1991. In 2001 it was included in the German government's Blue Book, a list of around 20 so-called "Cultural Lighthouses" – cultural institutions of national importance in the former East Germany – in an association called the KNK. Between 2001 and 2005 the museum was renovated and partly rebuilt under the architect Peter Kulka.

== Exhibitions, collection and other activities ==
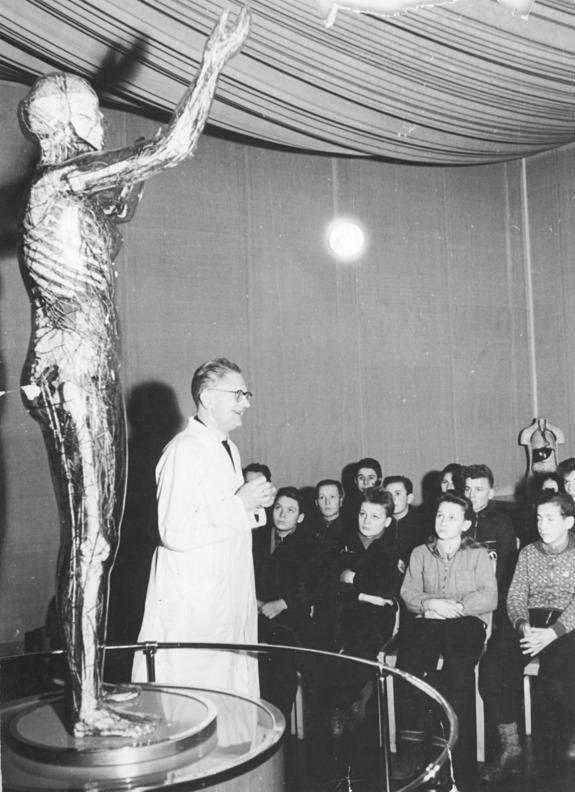
Transparent woman, 1958.

The museum's permanent features are the exhibition "Human Adventure" (Abenteuer Mensch), covering the human race, the body, and health in its cultural and social contexts, and a children's museum of the senses.

The museum owns an extensive collection of around 45,000 items documenting the public promotion of bodily awareness and healthy day-to-day behaviour, mostly from the early 20th century onwards.

There is a regular program of temporary exhibitions on social or scientific issues. Recent examples have included "Religious Energy", "What Is Beautiful?" and "War and Medicine". The museum also organises scientific and cultural events, including talks, meetings, debates, readings, and concerts.
