= Begrüßungsgeld =

Monetary gift from the West German government to visiting East Germans

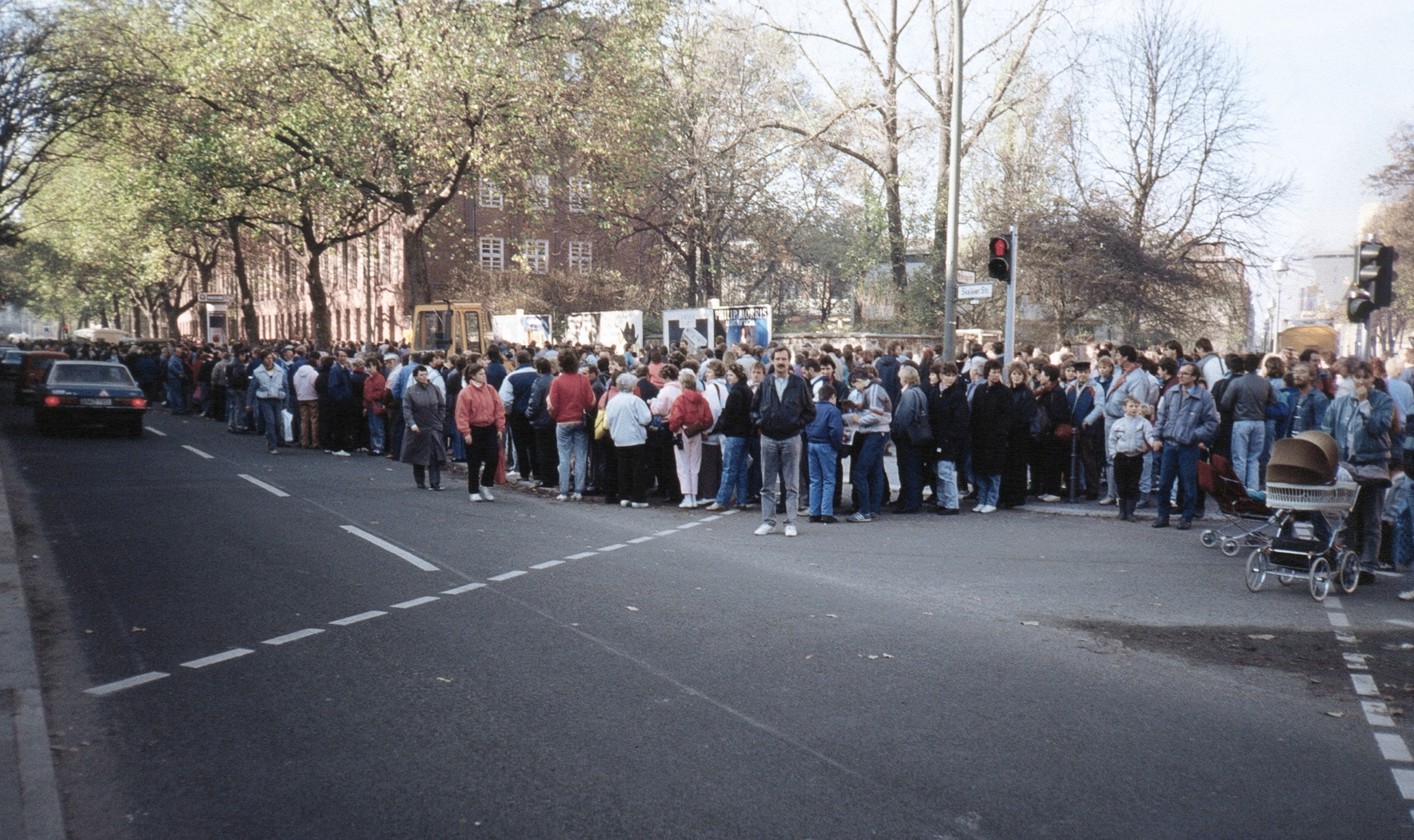
Hundreds of East Germans queue outside a post office in Skalitzer Straße, Kreuzberg, West Berlin, to collect their "Welcome money", 11 November 1989.

Begrüßungsgeld (English: "Welcome money") was, from 1970 until 29 December 1989, a gift from the government of the Federal Republic of Germany (West Germany) to visitors from the German Democratic Republic (GDR - East Germany). This situation originated with the policy of the GDR government restricting the amount of East German Marks (M) that could be exchanged into Deutsche Marks (DM) by GDR citizens when on approved travel to the West. At first, the GDR allowed the exchange of 70 M annually into DM, however by 1989, this sum was reduced to 15 M annually, which greatly restricted the ability of GDR citizens to travel to the West, even if they were approved to do so.

Originally, every GDR citizen was entitled to a "welcome money" payment of 30 DM twice annually; by 1988, this had been increased to a one-time payment of 100 DM annually, which was recorded in their travel documents. The state of Bavaria paid an additional 40 DM to visitors from the GDR. After the fall of the Berlin Wall on 9 November 1989, tens of thousands of East Germans queued in front of banks and town halls in West Germany to collect their "welcome money" for the first time.

The payment of "welcome money" ended on 29 December 1989, as it was never intended to be paid out to such large numbers of visitors. This was replaced with an arrangement whereby GDR citizens could exchange 100 M into DM at a ratio of 1:1, with an additional 100 M exchangeable into DM at a ratio of 5:1. This arrangement ended when the GDR adopted the West German currency on 1 July 1990.

In 1988, approximately 260 million DM was paid out to visitors from the GDR. However, in the months of November and December 1989 alone, 4 billion DM was paid out as "Welcome money". On the other hand, West Germans visiting the GDR had to submit to the Zwangsumtausch (or Mindestumtausch), the mandatory exchange of a specified amount of DM per day into the same amount of East German marks. From October 1980 onwards, the GDR required a minimum exchange of 25 DM daily. Such amounts could not be re-exchanged into DM when leaving the GDR. This practice also ended on 29 December 1989.
