= Education in East Germany =

Overview of education in the German Democratic Republic

Education in the German Democratic Republic (East Germany) was a socialist education system and was compulsory from age 6 until age 16. State-run schools included crèches, kindergartens, polytechnic schools, extended secondary schools, vocational training, and universities.

== Crèches ==
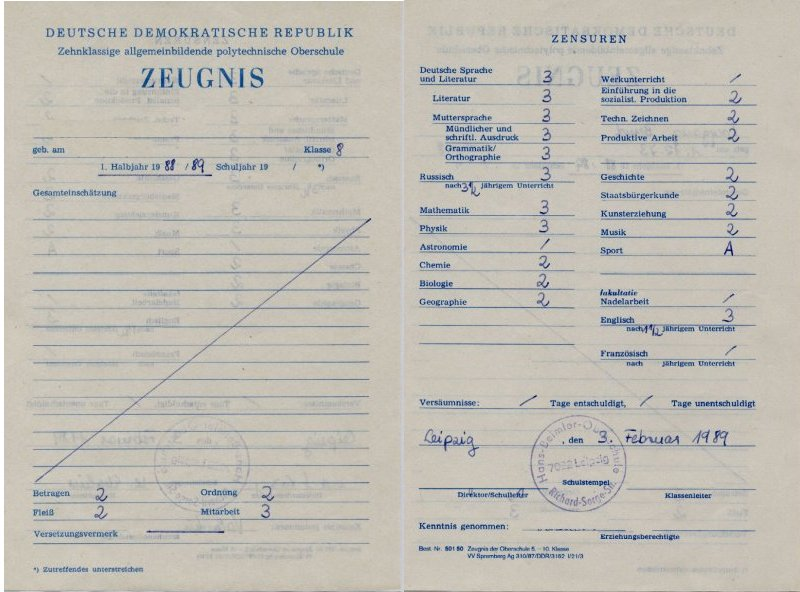
East German high school report card

The majority of East German parents (85%) worked outside of the home which resulted in a significant need for childcare services throughout the country. Children up to the age of three attended state run crèches (Kinderkrippen) which were often situated next to kindergarten buildings. Throughout the history of East Germany, young women would serve or volunteer in crèches in order to have more of an influence in raising their children.

Many crèches and polytechnic schools had a number of specialists on site, such as their own doctors and dentists.

A considerable number of crèches were built and developed during the post-Second World War construction period. The crèches were often situated within walking distance of residential blocks or on site at factories and collective farms.

Crèches were able to support approximately 80% of young East German children with rates as high as 99% in several urban centres. It cost 27.50 East German marks per child per month for full day care at the crèches.

== Kindergartens ==
Unlike West Germany, East Germany accomplished large-scale education reform and introduced a dense network of high-standard education facilities, especially kindergartens. A unique characteristic of East German kindergartens was the strong educational background of these institutions. Children from age three to six learned to interact with other children, got used to a stable daily routine and were introduced to the idea of learning. The children stayed together in the same group with the same group educator during the three years. The groups were called the little group (kleine Gruppe) for the young children of the age of three, the middle group (mittlere Gruppe) for the children of the age of four and the big group (große Gruppe) for children of the age of five.

Two times a day there were lesson-like pre-school activities (Beschäftigungen) that all children had to participate in. These activities were planned by the group educator and lasted 20 minutes in the little group, 25 minutes in the middle group and 30 minutes in the big group. The contents of the activities were regulated nationwide by a uniform teaching plan and included German language and speech, children's literature, mathematics, introduction to the socialist life (visiting factories, traffic education, cultural life, introduction to professions deemed important), introduction to natural and scientific phenomena (weather, seasons, sky, stars, rocks etc.), music, sports, artistic and constructive handicrafts and esteeming pieces of art.

There was no teaching of reading, writing or arithmetic, but the fundamental concepts were taught to develop intellectual and motor skills. For instance, introduction to set theory within the numbers up to 10, counting up to 20, handling of quantities, crafts and motor skills exercises to prepare the hand to writing, the handling of pencils, scissors, fabrics and glue.

Children were also encouraged to take an active role in the running of their kindergartens. Children often had to serve each other meals and help keep the kindergarten clean and tidy.

There were no fees charged for the full-day care in kindergartens, and there were enough places for 94% to 99% of East German children. 65% of children ages 3 to 6 were enrolled in kindergarten by 1970.

== Polytechnic schools ==
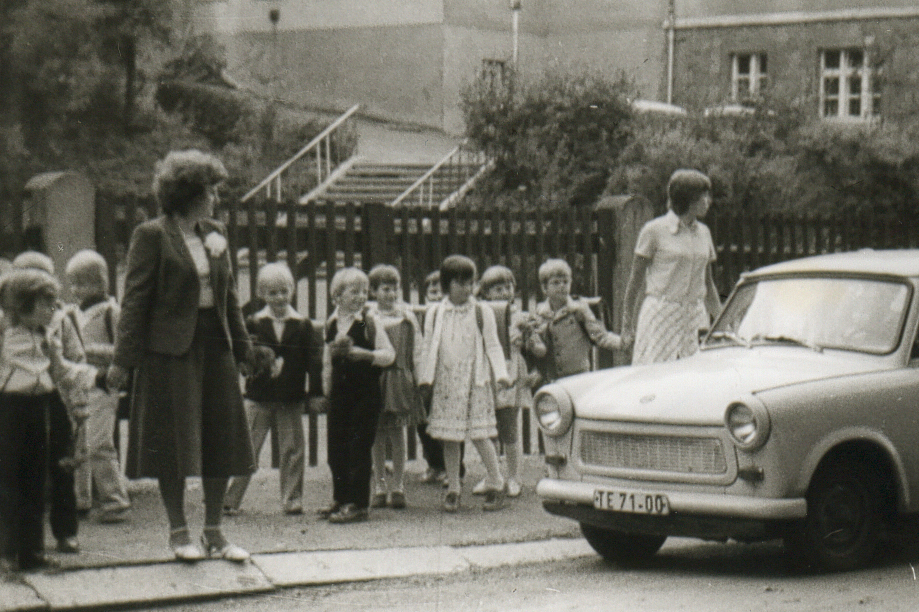
Beginning of the school year in the GDR, September 1980

The polytechnic secondary school, abbreviation POS for "Polytechnische Oberschule", was developed from 1957 to 1958 and established in 1959. The POS focused strongly on German language, mathematics, physics, chemistry, biology, astronomy, physical geography, sports, history, political education and of course, technology-related theoretical and practical work, including gardening, woodwork, metal work. Religion was not taught in school, but could be learned in the respective religious community outside of school. Instead of a comprehensive school with primary education followed by secondary education, the POS restructured the classic education process completely by establishing a systemic curriculum which expanded the concepts of secondary education into the lower classes. For instance in mathematics, handling of variables, math text problems with a multi-level solution, a fully developed embedded course in geometry, the introduction to vectors, the handling and solving of simple equations etc. were taught from the beginning of the first grade. But nevertheless other subjects like arts, music and so forth were not neglected but emphasised to be important for an all-around, gapless general education.

One lesson would last 45 minutes and students went to school six days a week. On Saturdays, there were approximately four or five lessons. The Ministry of Education determined a table of lessons (Stundentafel) which expressed the ideas of the curriculum by naming the subjects that were believed to be crucial for a modern general education together with the number of weekly lessons for every single subject. The table of lessons fragmented in two parts, the compulsory teaching (obligatorischer Unterricht) and the elective teaching (fakultativer Unterricht). Later a third component was introduced, the optionally compulsory teaching (wahlweise obligatorischer Unterricht).

Together, with the introduction of the POS grading at schools was reorganized as well.

School started early, usually between 7 am or 8 am.

The POS was designed as a reliable all-day school (verläßliche Tagesschule), which means the compulsory lessons took place in the morning and the timetable for each class was organised in a way that there should not be any free periods while classes should end at the same time every day. Therefore, by allocating sufficient resources to the education system, East Germany employed a high number of teachers and educators, so the average number of students per class lessened from 26 in the fifties to 19 and less in the seventies, the high number of compulsory lessons were evenly spread throughout the six schooldays of the week, there was de facto no loss of class time because of ill teachers or shortage of teachers, the compulsory teaching was finished around noon and the afternoon was free for a variety of optional activities like elective teaching, study groups, project groups, children's sports and organised afternoon care for students in the lower classes.

The beginning of the school year was September 1 unless that day was a Thursday, Friday or Saturday, then school started the following Monday. The school year always had 38 weeks of classes with 30 weeks covered by the nationwide unified curriculum.

Since 1951, the learning of the Russian language as the foreign language was obligatory, because of the leading role of the Soviet Union in the Eastern bloc. It was also available in English and French, but only as additional elective foreign languages (Universities required two foreign languages). The Russian lessons focused on the Cyrillic script, the writing, the reading and the grammar of the Russian language. To be able to have a substantial conversation was not an aim, but to be able to use professional and technical Russian literature. The speaking skills should reach a level of sufficient fluency to have a small conversation with a local. There were only few opportunities for student exchanges. Appreciated by parents were the so-called head marks (Kopfnoten) which assessed behavior, industriousness, order, and cooperation. These were combined with a short teacher's essay about the student's character, success or progress, advice for future improvements - here and there from a socialistic point of view.

From the seventh year onwards, students visited a factory, power station or farm one day per week for 4 hours, depending on their location. At some of these places, the student would work alongside regular employees.

There were annual championships on various subjects with the winners receiving prizes. The Russian language and mathematics championships were seen and promoted as very prestigious and competitive as well as regular championships in sport, called Spartakiade (from the word Spartacus).

== Vocational training ==
If a student did not enter into the EOS to take the Abitur (similar to the A-level in England) after the 8th year of POS, they applied for vocational training after the 9th year. The result of the 9th year was therefore often more important than the final exam. The contract was then signed during the tenth year, so that after the tenth year of polytechnical school, a student went on to 2 or 3 years (depending on subject) of vocational training. Vocational training was offered for every subject that was not taught at university, such as masonry, farming, accountancy, kindergarten teacher, nurse, mechanics, electricians, carpentry, butchery, etc.

Vocational training was split in practical work and theoretical learning which focused both on the studied subject of career, and ended with a certificate and a formal title.

In the latter part of the apprenticeship the student was integrated into the team where they would work after the apprenticeship. The vocational training could take place in the students home town, but often occurred in another city. Students lived there in an Internat (boarding school). In most cases that was the first time in the young persons life they lived "independent" from their parents' home for one or two years. The students were allowed to visit home on the weekends.

With a completed apprenticeship the worker/farmer was qualified to have additional training for supervisor (Meister), or technological school (Ingenieurschule). To go to university, Abitur was necessary.

Big companies often trained more apprentices than they could absorb. Because after apprenticeship people went to national service, moved town, went to universities, changed jobs to work closer to home, etc. Hence companies had all age levels from 16-year-olds to seniors, who then trained up the juniors before retiring.

== Universities ==
Entrance to East German Universities was very limited. To attend university education in East Germany, one had to attend the erweiterte Oberschule. Access to these schools was restricted to the 2-3 best students per POS class. Entry to the EOS was after grade 8 for 4 years. At 18 years of age, every youth either had finished EOS or vocational training. A special form was vocational training with Abitur, which lasted three years after leaving the POS.

East German universities were closely linked to both schools and to industry. The universities selected their own students from the applicants. As the school system was centralized, all school certificates were comparable. No university entry exam was necessary.

These universities primarily focused on technical education.

There were two ways to get into a university: either via EOS or via apprenticeship plus abitur. For those who found their calling later in life, there were Volkshochschulen (People's Colleges) for night classes and a special university preparation course in a boarding school lasting 1 year in an ABF (Arbeiter- und Bauern Fakultät; Workers and Farmers College). While everyone could visit the VHS, access to the ABF was restricted to workers and farmers with at least five years of working experience. This was usually organized by the HR department of the company where they worked.

National service was 18 months for males between the age of 18 and 26. Often prospective students were intimidated into serving three years as NCO in order to begin university early.

For popular subjects, such as information technology, or prestigious subjects, such as law or medicine, there were more applicants to university than places. Several criteria were taken into account: school exams, national service time, patriotism, ideology, religious affiliation (better to be atheist than religious), communist party membership, etc. In the mid-1980s, there was an important change: those who wanted to study informatics could have their national service halved to nine months.
