= Tourism in East Germany =

Tourism in the German Democratic Republic (GDR) was organised through the state via Reisebüro der DDR (Travel Bureau of the GDR).

== For foreigners ==
=== Types of travel ===
==== Tours ====
A traveller would first book their trip at a travel agent that was accredited by the Reisebüro. The travel agent would then offer the traveller a choice of any of the many package tours that the Reisebüro offered. In some countries, travellers could book trips through participating domestic travel agents, which would then coordinate with the Reisebüro to make reservations.

==== Individual travel ====
Independent travel was permitted within the GDR, with motoring or taking a railway trip through the country being the most popular options. The itinerary would be arranged through the Reisebüro, and visits could be arranged at border posts and other Reisebüro offices in the GDR. More complicated excursions would be arranged before arrival, and the formalities involved with a holiday in the GDR (such as the visa, any hotel bookings, advice on currency exchange, etc.) would be taken care of by the Reisebüro. This made the border crossing between East and West Germany much smoother.

=== Formalities ===
As with all states, foreign nationals from countries without the appropriate treaties were required to have visas to enter or exit the GDR. An exception involved military and civilian government personnel of the United States, the United Kingdom, and France based in West Germany and West Berlin who, when transiting to and from West Berlin via land routes (i.e., road and rail) and when in East Berlin, were under the jurisdiction of the Soviet Armed Forces and not the East German government.

There were four basic types of visas:

- Non-stop transit visa (for example, for travellers transiting between West Germany and West Berlin)
- Transit visa (with 72-hour stopover)
- Standard entry and exit visa (Visum zur Ein- und Ausreise)
- Day visa (Tagesvisum) for tourists from West Berlin wanting to visit East Berlin.

Additional rules applied to diplomats, journalists, business travellers, and other non-tourist visitors.

All of the four basic visa types could, in theory, be arranged at the Reisebüro offices at the main border crossings. In practice, to avoid the bureaucracy in obtaining an entry visa, it was simply easier to enter East Berlin on a day visa and then have an extension arranged at a Reisebüro office in the city. Visitors to East Germany could only enter the country by car, bus, or train – not by bicycle or on foot. The exceptions to this were international airports, as well as Checkpoint Charlie. A special case involved the Friedrichstraße train station in East Berlin, which one could reach from West Berlin by U-Bahn, S-Bahn, or long-distance train.

Visitors not on non-stop transit visas were required to change a minimum of DM25, or its equivalent in other hard currency, into GDR marks every day of their stay at the standard rate of 1:1. An exception was made for persons booking overnight hotel stays in the GDR, as the hotel charges were payable in hard currency and almost always exceeded the minimum daily exchange amount. The visa fee itself was an additional DM5–15 (depending on the type of visa).

In addition to visas, travellers to the GDR staying overnight (or longer) were required to register with the Volkspolizei (The People's Police). An "Aufenthaltsberechtigung" (residence entitlement) stamp would be placed in the traveller's passport; the names of each city or Bezirk (region) where the traveller was registered, as well as the expiration date of the registration, would be entered in the appropriate space. Many times, the hotel where the traveller stayed would take care of this for the traveller by taking the passport at check-in, giving the traveller a receipt, and returning the passport to the traveller the next morning, removing any inconvenience.

=== Customs ===
Gifts up to the value of 200 East German marks could be imported. This was not based on the price the traveller would have paid for them at home, but rather the price the item would sell for in East Germany.

=== Accommodations ===
==== Hotels ====
Visitors to the GDR generally stayed in hotels belonging to the state-run Interhotel network. Contrary to the expectations of Westerners who envisioned the GDR hotels as run down, Interhotels (especially the Metropol and Grand Hotels in East Berlin, the Bellevue in Dresden, and the Merkur in Leipzig) met or exceeded international standards for hotel accommodations.

There were four classes of hotels:

- Deluxe – a minimum of 100 GDR marks per night per person
- Expensive – 90–100 GDR marks
- Moderate – 70–90 GDR marks
- Inexpensive – 40–70 GDR marks

A room with a private bath would cost an extra 5 or 10 GDR marks. As previously noted, Western travellers were required to pay hotel charges in hard currency, even though the charges might be denominated in GDR marks.

==== Camping ====
Thirty campsites run by Intercamp dotted the GDR in the following areas:

- East Berlin
- Baltic coast
- Mecklenburg lake district
- Dresden and surrounding area
- Erfurt
- Leipzig
- Harz Mountains

Intercamp sites were open from 1 May to 30 September and were equipped with electricity, sanitation, running water, and other facilities. As with many equivalent private schemes in Western countries, booking in advance was required.

==== Youth hostels ====
East German youth hostels were not officially open to Westerners, but sometimes Westerners were allowed to use them if space was available.

== Tipping ==
Initially, tipping was officially forbidden by the government, which viewed it as distinctly bourgeois (receiving extra money without actually doing anything extra). However, the attempt failed.

== Things to see ==
=== East Berlin ===
East Berlin was rebuilt as a modern capital after World War II. The hub of the city was the Alexanderplatz, a pedestrian square. Other tourist attractions included the Fernsehturm (the TV Tower), the Palast der Republik (the East German legislative building), and the Brandenburg Gate (then walled off with the Berlin Wall).

Potsdam was also heavily promoted by the East German government, particularly Sanssouci and the surrounding gardens, which was the former summer palace of Frederick the Great.

=== The Baltic Coast ===
The East German government developed a series of beach resorts for Western tourists along the coast in the districts of the state nowadays called Mecklenburg-Vorpommern.

=== Erzgebirge Ore Mountains and Thuringia Forests ===
The Erzgebirge Ore Mountains contained the GDR's highest point, Fichtelberg (1,214 metres (3,983 ft)). Oberhof, a resort town in the Thuringia forests, contained an artificial luge/bobsled run.

=== Eisenhüttenstadt ===
Eisenhüttenstadt is a city on the Oder River near the border with Poland. The city was originally named Stalinstadt, but the name changed during the Destalinization period. The buildings of Eisenhüttenstadt are an archetypal example of modernist architecture and the city was styled as a "model socialist city" when it was constructed by the East German government in 1950.

== Freikörperkultur ==
FKK was legal.

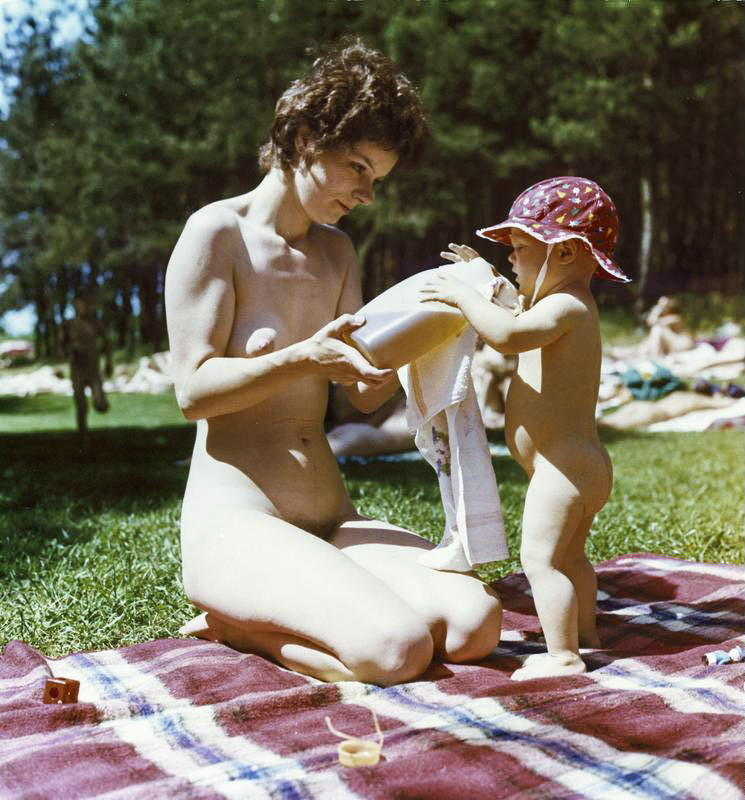
At the Herzsprung naturist FKK lake park in Brandenburg state, Germany; one of the most popular FKK bathing parks in the Angermünde district.
