= Love Without Fear (film) =

1989 East German public-education documentary film

Liebe ohne Angst (Love without fear) is a 1989 East German public-education documentary film, directed by Frank Rinnelt. It is 25 minutes long. It was the only HIV/AIDS prevention film made in East Germany. It was produced by DEFA film studios on commission for the German Hygiene Museum in Dresden.

It includes discussions with young people and some erotic scenes. It does not focus on homosexuality.

== Synopsis ==
The film follows a young filmmaker as she goes to a blood bank to have an AIDS test, while she reflects in a stream-of-consciousness style on her own sex life. She interviews a doctor at the blood bank. The film also follows the AIDS prevention group Aidsgesprächskreises (English: AIDS discussion circle) at a disco as they discuss AIDS prevention and show the ignorance and embarrassment of some young people about the disease. An AIDS expert explains how the disease is transmitted via the exchange of body fluids and clarifies that it is not a "gay disease". The film also interviews an anonymous young man who had recently tested positive and discusses his initial shock and emotions.
