= Kulturfinger =

Coordinates: 53°33′29″N 13°15′37″E

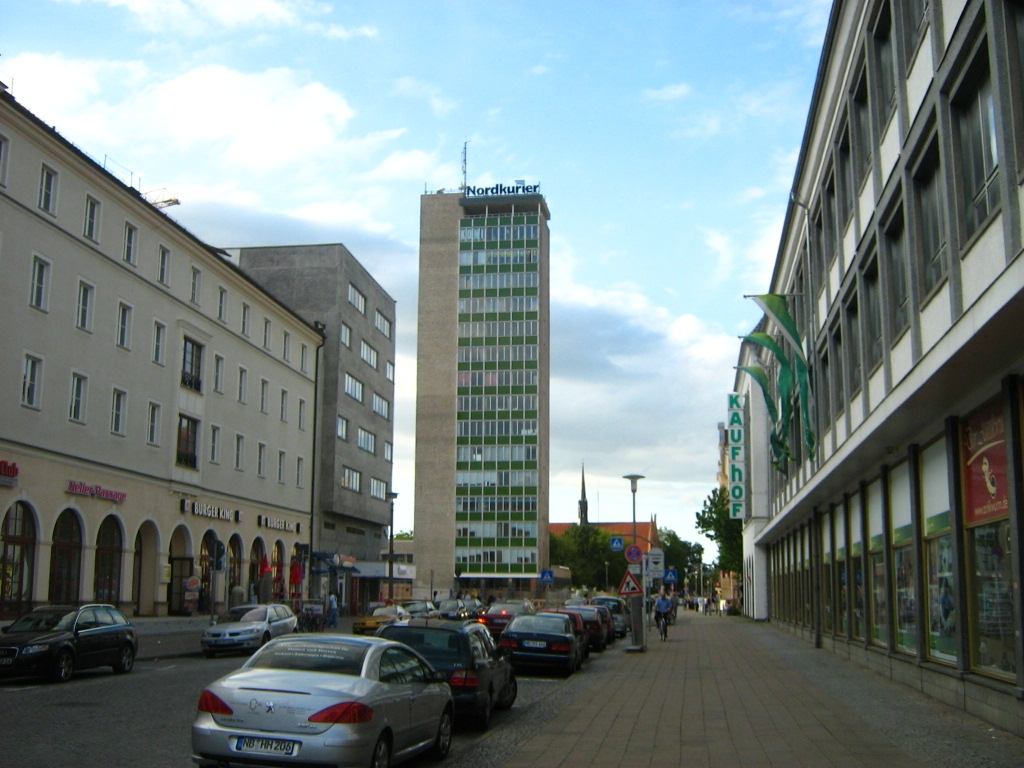
The Kulturfinger seen from the distance

The Kulturfinger is the nickname of a steel-framed tower built during the days of the communist German Democratic Republic that is the tallest building in Neubrandenburg, Germany. It is part of the Haus der Kultur und Bildung (German for House of Culture and Education) or HKB, the city's cultural institution.

The 56-m, 16-story mixed-use socialist realist building was designed by Neubrandenburg chief architect Iris Grund, who had studied under East Germany's prominent architect Hermann Henselmann. Along with the adjacent theater, also designed by Grund, it opened on July 17, 1965. The building was renovated in the 1990s, following German reunification.

== See also ==
- Oderturm
- Jen-Tower
- City-Hochhaus Leipzig
- Park Inn Berlin
- Fernsehturm
