= City-Hochhaus Leipzig =

36-storey skyscraper in Leipzig, Germany

City-Hochhaus
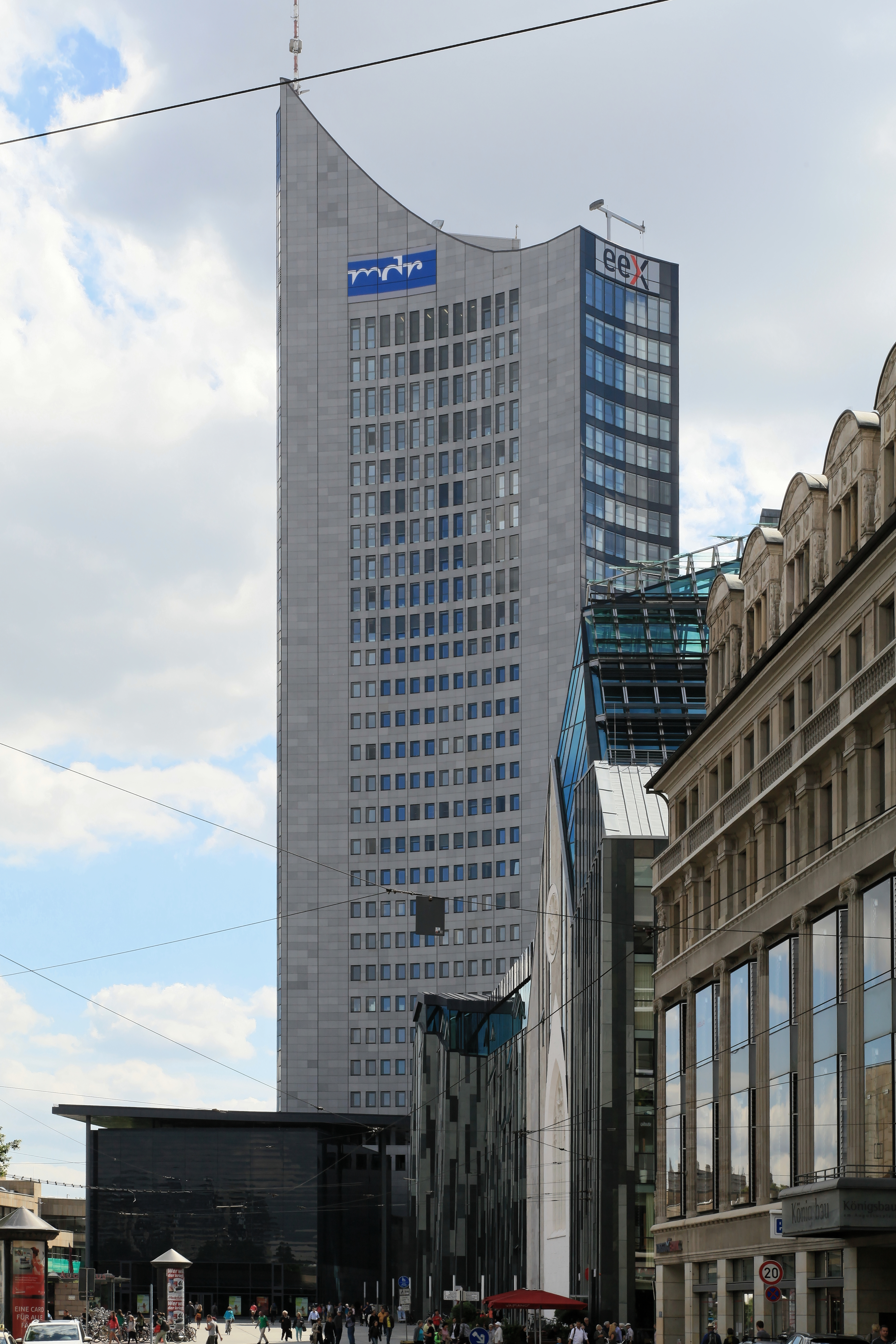
- Interactive map of the City-Hochhaus area
- Alternative names: Uniriese; Weisheitszahn; MDR-Turm

General information
- Status: Completed
- Type: Commercial offices
- Location: Augustusplatz 9 Leipzig, Germany
- Coordinates: 51.3375°N 12.3794°E
- Construction started: 1968
- Completed: 1972
- Owner: Merrill Lynch
- Management: CRE Resolution GmbH

Height
- Antenna spire: 155 m (509 ft)
- Roof: 142.5 m (468 ft)

Technical details
- Floor count: 36
- Floor area: 800–850 m^{2} (8,600–9,100 sq ft)

Design and construction
- Architect: Hermann Henselmann

City-Hochhaus is a 36-story skyscraper in Leipzig, Germany. At 142.5 m (468 ft), it is the tallest multistory building in Leipzig and is beside the eastern part of the inner city ring road in Leipzig's district Mitte. The tower was designed by architect Hermann Henselmann in the shape of an open book, and built between 1968 and 1972. It followed Henselmann's idea to cap central places in cities with a prominent tower, such as the Jen-Tower in Jena and Fernsehturm in Berlin.

City-Hochhaus was originally part of the University of Leipzig campus at Augustusplatz, was sold by the state government of Saxony and is now owned by the U.S. investment bank Merrill Lynch. The building was completely renovated between 1999 and 2002, when it lost its aluminium sheathing which was replaced by grey granite. The offices are now rented to private tenants, including the public broadcaster MDR, the European Energy Exchange, and a restaurant called 'Panorama'. The roof is equipped with a viewing platform.

The building is nicknamed Weisheitszahn (English: wisdom tooth) by locals due to its form, or after its previous function, the Uniriese (English: university giant).

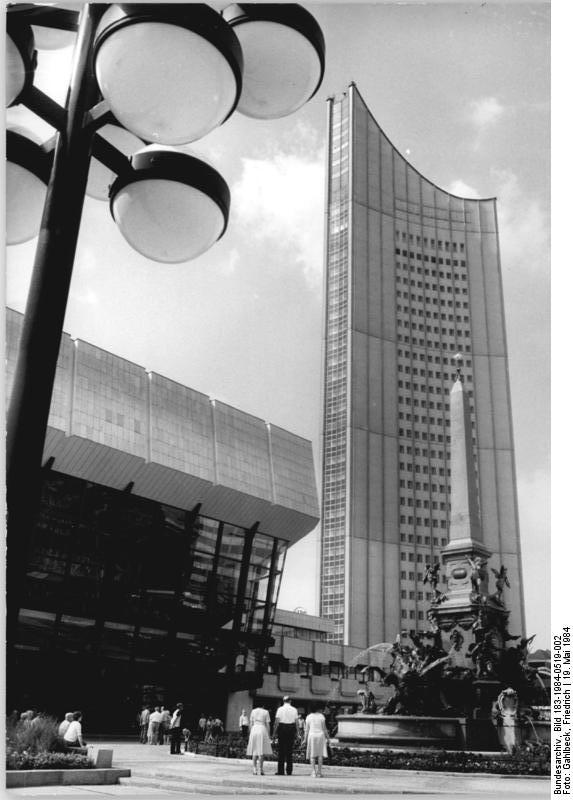
The building in 1984, with the then recently completed Gewandhaus in view

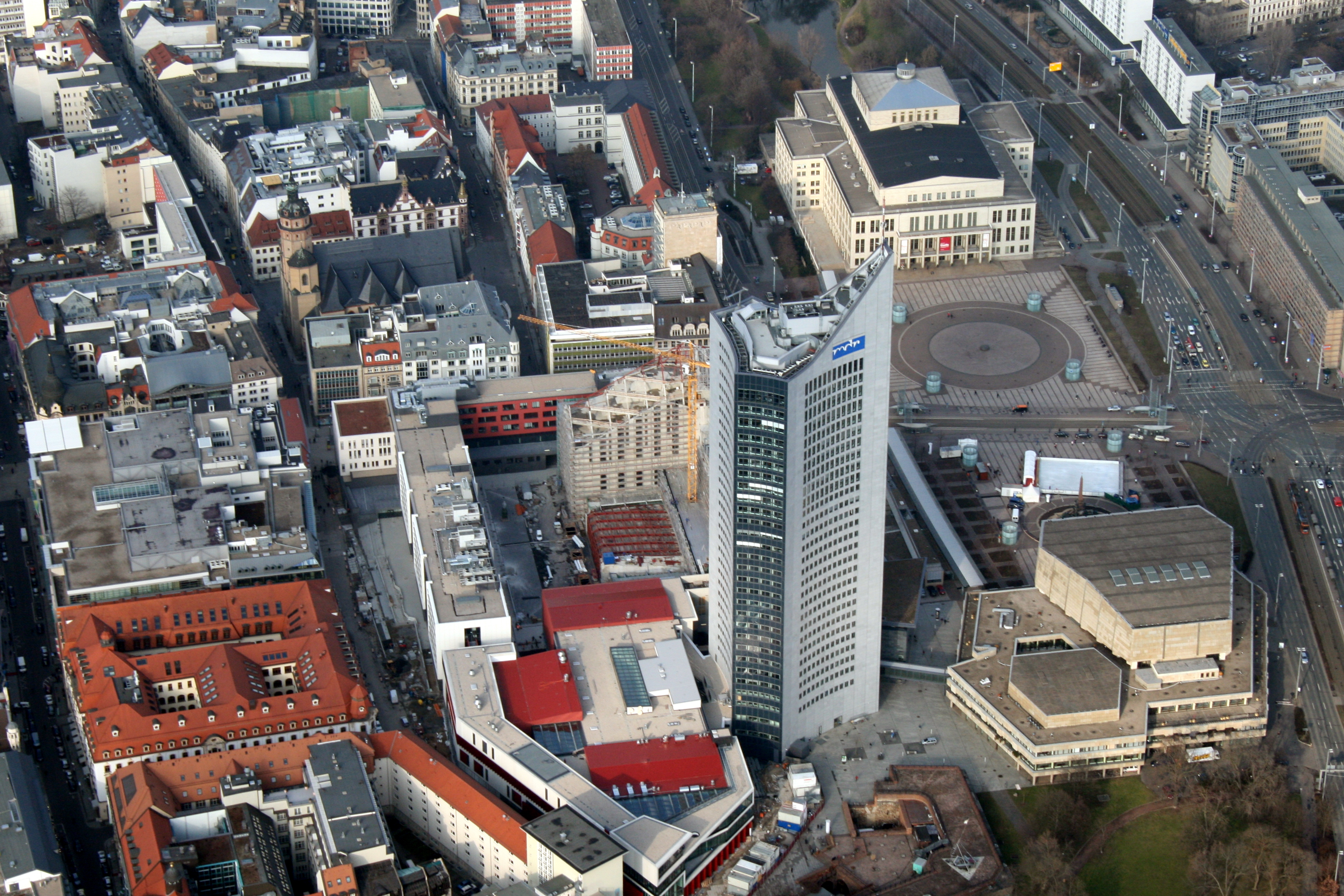
City-Hochhaus from above

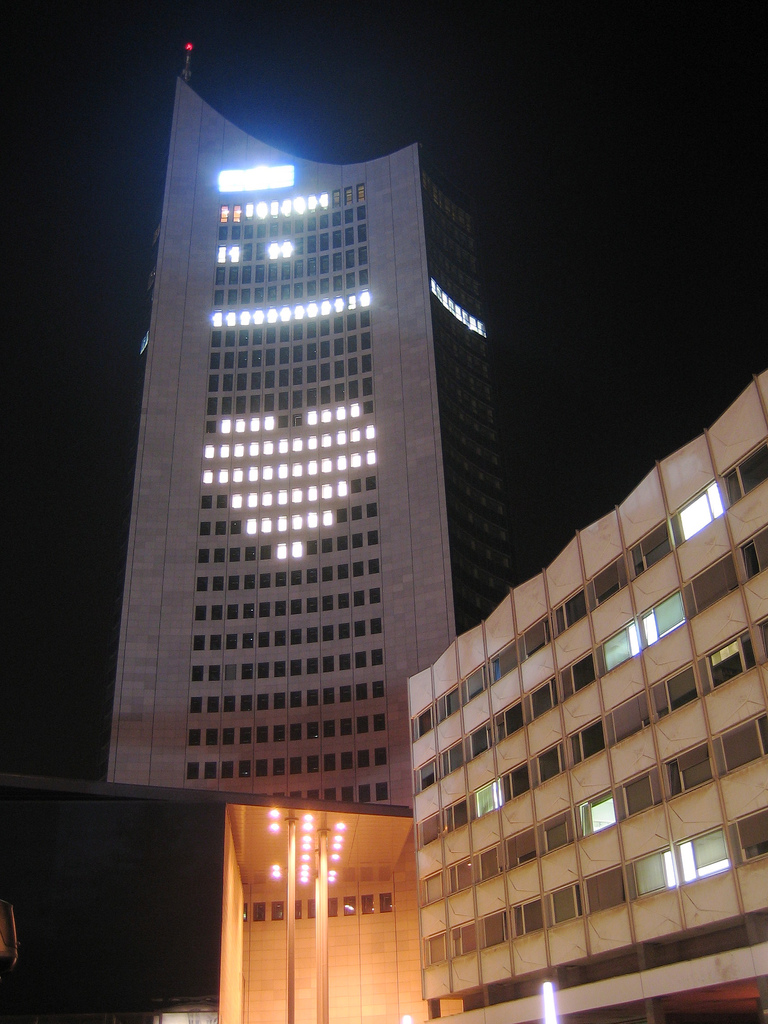
At night

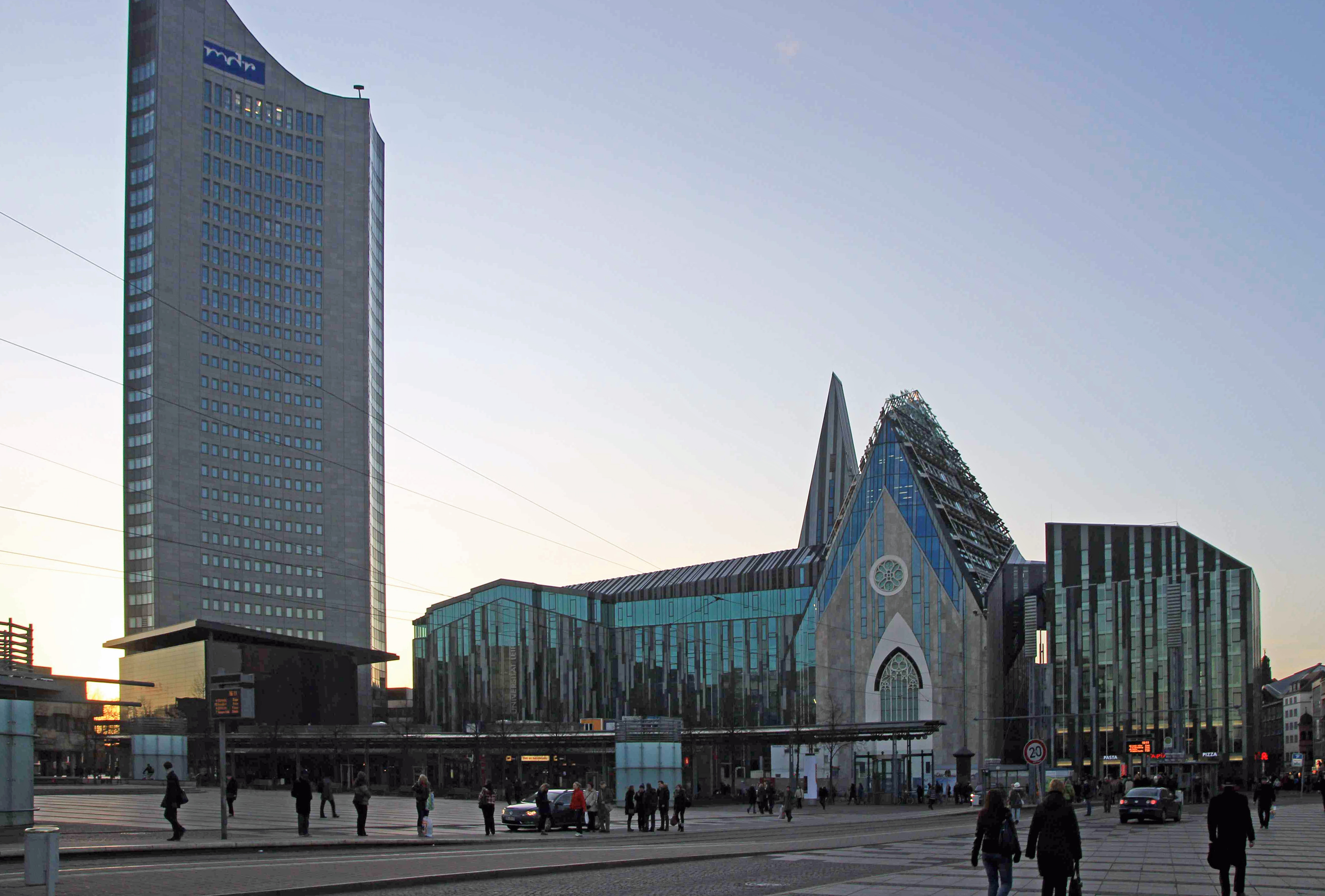
The Augusteum of the University of Leipzig with the highrise to the left

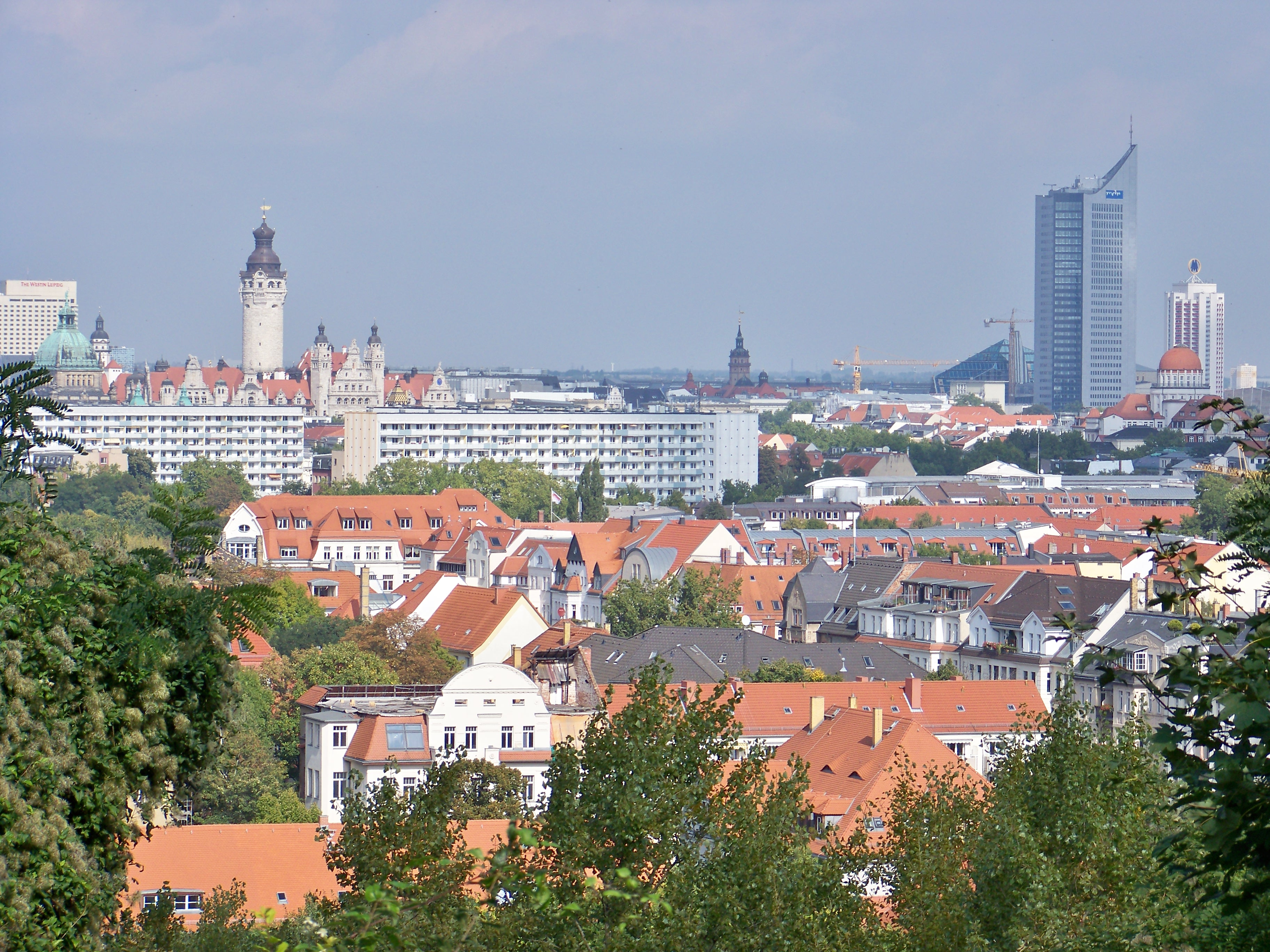
The skyline of Leipzig is dominated by the City-Hochhaus.

== Panorama ==
Due to the height and location of the house in the city center, it offers a panoramic view of the entire city. Since 1972, the Panorama Café had been on the 26th and 27th floor during the GDR era, but was closed in 1991. In 2002, after the renovation of the house, the new panorama restaurant was opened. The restaurant now operates under the name "Plate of Art". It was redesigned in 2007 according to plans by the architect Rüdiger Renno and the designer Till Brömme.

A staircase leads from the restaurant floor to the open viewing platform on the 31st floor. At a height of 120 m (390 ft), it provides a good overview of the city center and far beyond the Leipzig area. Only towards the east-southeast does the spire obstruct the view. Among other things, if the air is clear enough, there are Fichtelberg (110 km (68 mi)), Auersberg (100 km (62 mi)), Kulpenberg, Wurmberg, Brocken (132 km (82 mi)), Viktorshöhe (98 km (61 mi)) and even some Ore Mountains peaks in the Czech Republic (e.g. Jelení hora, 109 km (68 mi) to the southeast) to see. The platform is a popular tourist destination.

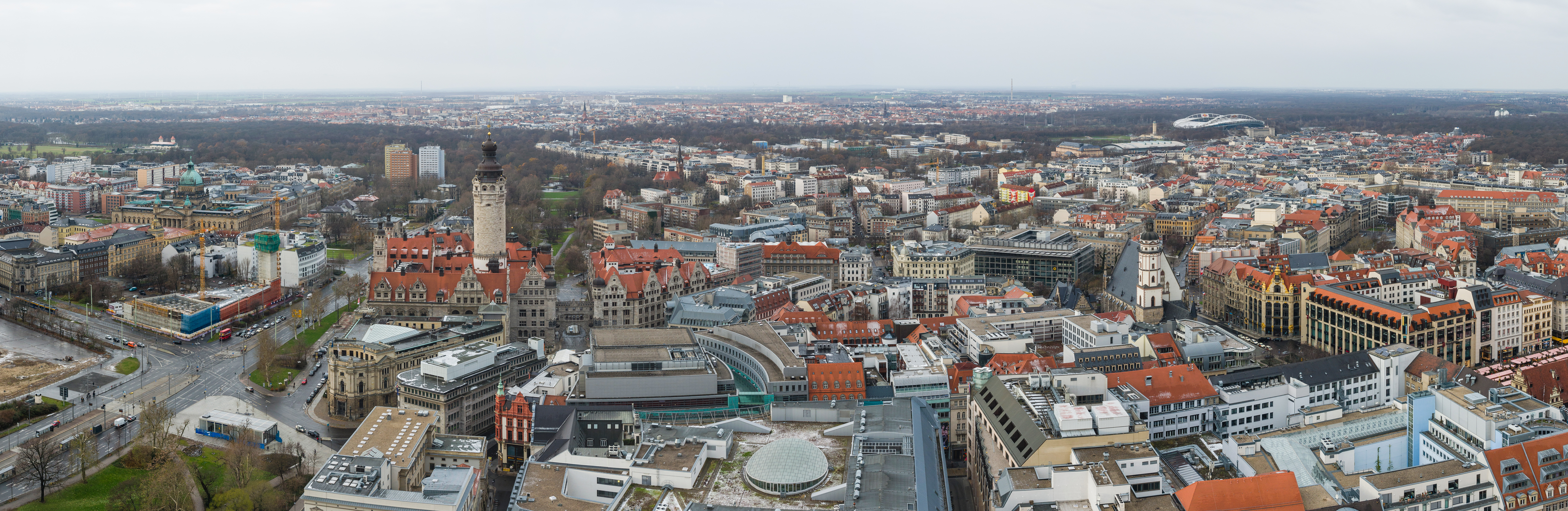
Looking west from the observation deck (2013)

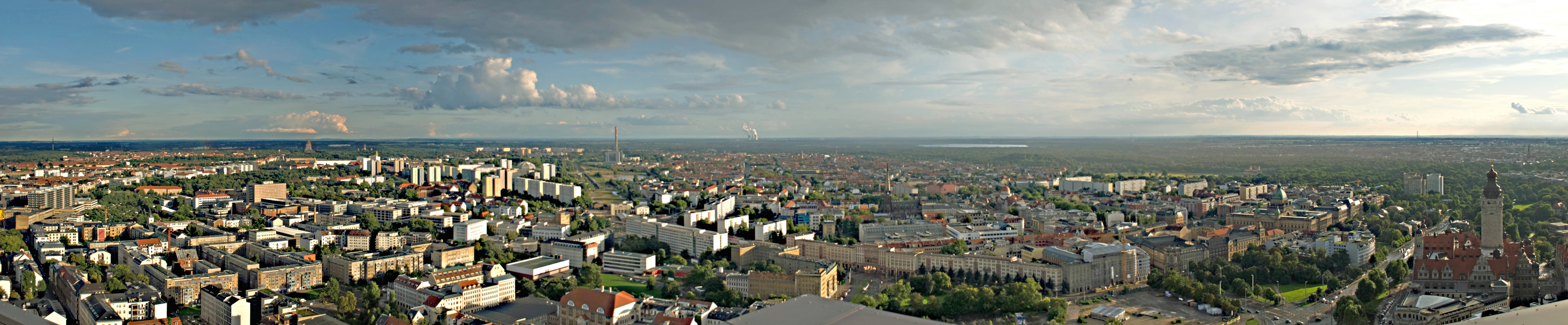
Approx. 180° panoramic view to the south (2010)

== See also ==
- Architecture of Leipzig - City-Hochhaus
- List of tallest buildings in Germany
- List of tallest buildings in Leipzig
- Oderturm
- Jen-Tower
- Park Inn Berlin
- Fernsehturm Berlin
- Kulturfinger

== Literature ==
- Horst Riedel: City-Hochhaus. In: Stadtlexikon Leipzig von A bis Z. PRO LEIPZIG, Leipzig 2012, ISBN 978-3-936508-82-6, p. 91.
- Wolfgang Hocquél: Leipzig – Architektur von der Romanik bis zur Gegenwart, 1st edition, Passage-Verlag, Leipzig 2001, ISBN 3-932900-54-5, p. 119-121
