= Hans Knöll =

German microbiologist

- Born: January 7, 1913; Wiesbaden
- Died: June 26, 1978 (aged 65); Stralsund
- Occupation: Microbiologist

Hans Knöll (January 7, 1913 – June 26, 1978) was a German physician and microbiologist. He was the director of the Central Institute of Microbiology and Experimental Therapy in Jena from 1953 to 1976, a member of the Academy of Sciences of the German Democratic Republic (i.e. of East Germany), and professor of bacteriology at the University of Jena. He was awarded the National Prize of the GDR in 1949 and 1952. In the late 1960s he got involved in an effort to save the historic center of Jena, protesting against the "socialist" urban development plans.

== Career ==
In 1931 he started studying medicine at the University of Frankfurt on Main. A year later he joined the Nazi Party and the Sturmabteilung (SA). He quit the latter in 1935 (after the Night of the Long Knives). Little else is known about his political involvement during this period because his name does not appear in the 200,000-page records recovered from the Nazi Party Chancellery. He gained the Dr. med. degree in 1938. During his studies he was also an assistant at the Institute of Colloid Research at Frankfurt under Raphael Eduard Liesegang. In 1937 Knöll started cooperating with Jenaer Glaswerk Schott and Gen. which developed all-glass bacterial filters. He developed an accurate measuring procedure for checking the filters. In return the company offered him the opportunity to establish and manage its bacterial lab—a full-time job Knöll began in November 1938. At the glass works he established a still existing collection of defined strains of different microorganisms as basis for filter checking.

The Schott glass works were associated with Carl Zeiss AG. This led Knöll to cooperate with the Zeiss factory in the development of phase contrast and fluorescent microscopy. In 1944 he participated in the isolation of nucleosides in living bacteria using phase contrast microscopy. In the same year this successful cooperation led to the transformation of the four-employee lab into the Institute of Microbiology, also known as the Schott-Zeiss-Institute because it was financially supported by the two firms.

During World War II, Knöll's attention was also drawn to penicillin. In 1942 his institute delivered penicillin on laboratory scale. Nazi Germany did not manage to achieve industrial scale production of penicillin before the war ended. After end of the war, Jena fell into the Soviet occupation zone, and the Soviet military administration ordered an immediate expansion in penicillin production. As a result of the rapid increase in the size of the operation, the fermentation section of the Institute of Microbiology became known as Jenapharm in 1947. In 1950 the Institute of Microbiology officially became an independent nationally owned factory, the VEB Jenapharm, and Knöll was appointed its director. The company's portfolio quickly grew to include streptomycin, vitamins, analgesics, and transfusion solutions. Its workforce expanded to hundreds of employees by the end of the 1940s.

In 1949 Knöll obtained his Habilitation degree, and a year later he became professor of bacteriology at the University of Jena, but he also continued to lead Jenapharm. There Knöll initiated BCG production, which was used for the tuberculosis vaccination regime in the GDR. The scope of this operation was large enough that a separate building was erected on Jena's Beutenberg Hill in 1952.

A year later Knöll left Jenapharm to become the director of the newly founded Institute of Microbiology and Experimental Therapy (IMET) built on the same Beutenber Hill, according to his directions. In 1956 the institute became part of the East German Academy of Sciences, and its name changed to Central Institute of Microbiology and Experimental Therapy (ZIMET). With this occasion Knöll became a member of the academy. In the twenty years that Knöll led ZIMET, the institute became one of the largest in the GDR with over 1000 employees, and engaged in research and development in antibiotics, biotechnology, experimental therapy, medical and environ microbiology, microbial genetics, and steroids. At ZIMET Knöll continued to work on problems concerning the miniaturization and automation of microbiological methods. He developed a system of apparatuses for the selection of antibiotic producing microorganisms, and the evaluation of antibiotic activity. He is credited with a complete description of the life cycle of Sarcina maxima in 1973.

== Preservationist activism ==
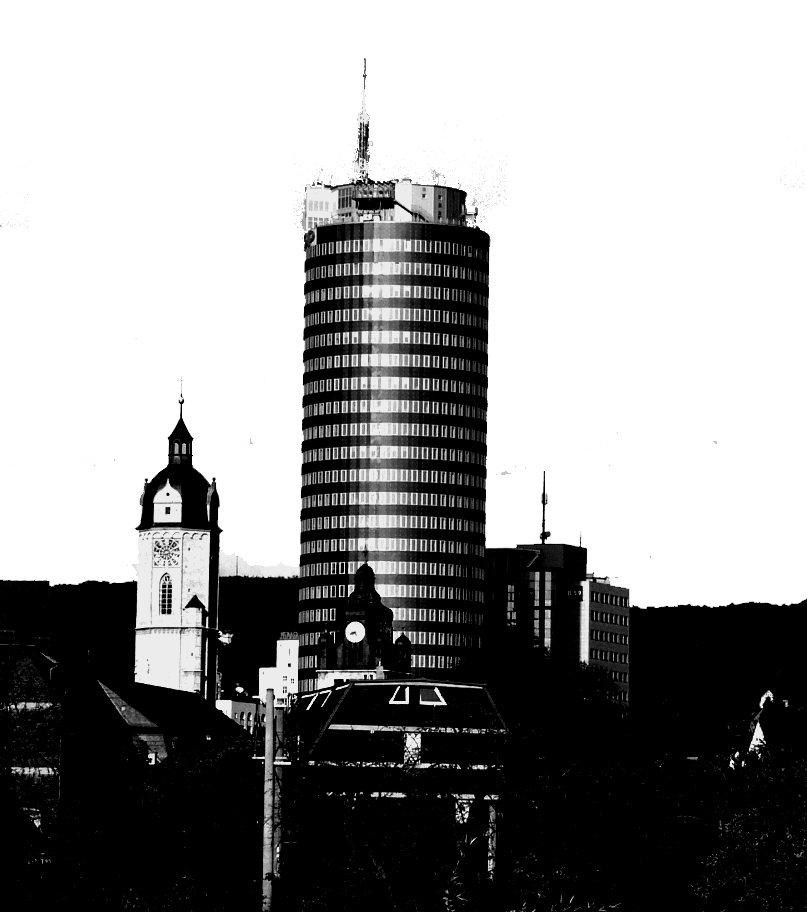
Jen-Tower next to steeple of the Collegium Jenense's church

Immediately after World War II ended, following Soviet leadership, reconstruction in Jena had emphasized preserving the historically developed structure of East German cities, as well as regional building styles. This policy changed in the 1960s when the central government put emphasis on new and modern buildings. In Jena this change was materialized by an urban plan centered around building a massive skyscraper, the Jen-Tower, within the intimate urban core of the city in 1968–1969. The skyscraper was meant to be a research facility for the VEB Zeiss, and also to symbolize architecturally the victory of socialism in Germany. Walter Ulbricht, the Socialist Unity Party leader, personally pushed for these developments in early 1968 during a visit to Jena. To accommodate this massive structure, VEB Zeiss would raze much of the old inner city. The activists that fought against the tower's construction nicknamed it "penis jenensis" taking advantage of its tall cylindrical shape.

Collegium Jenense was a thirteenth-century Dominican cloister that was the principal site of the University of Jena from its founding until the mid-nineteenth century. Both Goethe and Alexander von Humboldt had lectured within its walls. The Collegium was not located exactly on the building site of the Zeiss skyscraper, but it was meant to be demolished to make room for an adjacent recreational center that was intended to be connected to the tower. In 1969 Knöll dedicated himself to saving this site. Taking advantage of his fame he pressured the architect Hermann Henselmann, the city's mayor, the university's rector, Zeiss' general director and other local authorities. He also enlisted several colleagues in this effort, including the physicist Max Steenbeck who also served as technical adviser to Walter Ulbricht. The authorities tried to choke off his efforts by deprecating them. They accused Knöll of “deviously” misinforming his fellow citizens about the collegium's fate, and questioned his Institute's overall loyalty to the regime.

Taking advantage of the economic difficulties that VEB Zeiss faced at the time, Knöll demanded immediate assurances that the Collegium would not be demolished until the firm actually had the money to build the recreation center. This was an effective tactic and two years later the state officially conceded that the recreational center would not be built and that the collegium would be spared. The height and breadth of the tower was also reduced. Nevertheless, when it was completed in 1971 it had 27 stories. After its completion the tower became a white elephant, and VEB Zeiss sought to escape the cost of maintaining it. The Council of Ministers shifted ownership of the building to the University of Jena, despite its protestations.

== Legacy ==
ZIMET was officially closed in 1991 by a decision of Academy of Sciences of the GDR, and its divisions were spun into five separate institutes in 1992. One of these successors, the Hans Knöll Institute for Natural Products Research (HKI), was named after him. The institute was admitted in the Gottfried Wilhelm Leibniz Scientific Community in 2003.
