= Oderturm =

Der Oderturm
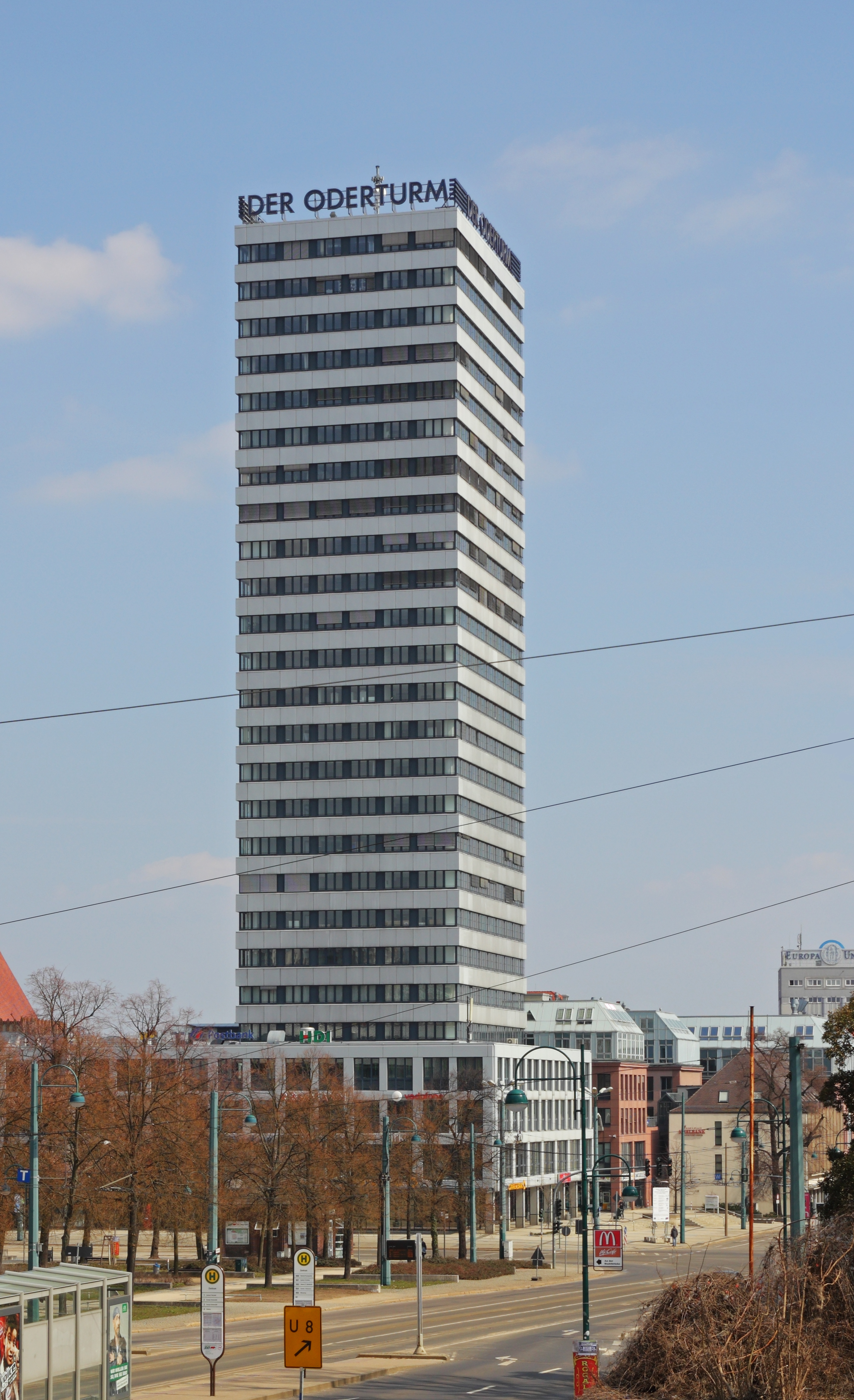
- Interactive map of the Der Oderturm area

General information
- Type: Commercial offices
- Architectural style: Modernism
- Location: Logenstraße; Frankfurt an der Oder, Germany
- Coordinates: 52.3423°N 14.5518°E
- Completed: 1968 – 1976

Height
- Antenna spire: 95 m (312 ft)
- Roof: 89 m (292 ft)

Technical details
- Floor count: 24
- Floor area: 41,000 m^{2} (440,000 sq ft)

Design and construction
- Architects: Paul Teichmann; Hans Tulke

The Oderturm is a 24-storey, 89 m (292 ft) office building in Frankfurt (Oder), Germany, built between 1968 and 1976 when the city was part of East Germany. It is the tallest building in Brandenburg. The 107 m (351 ft) hall containing Tropical Islands and the 161 m (528 ft) steam generator at Schwarze Pumpe power station are taller structures, though they lack occupied floors.

== Background ==
The tower was designed by a collective under architects Hans Tulke and Paul Teichmann and built in part by Free German Youth (FDJ) work brigades; construction lasted nearly eight years. It was planned as an office building, but when it opened it housed a 274-bed dormitory for workers in the Frankfurt semiconductor plant, as well as a 160-bed Jugendtourist-Hotel, similar to a youth hostel, but geared towards organised meetings such as the Whitsuntide meetings of the FDJ with its Polish counterpart, the ZSMP, of which the 1977 meeting, not long after the opening of the hotel, was the most significant.

After German reunification, the building underwent refurbishing from 1992 to 1994, following the plans of architect Monika Krebs, when it opened as the Oderturm.

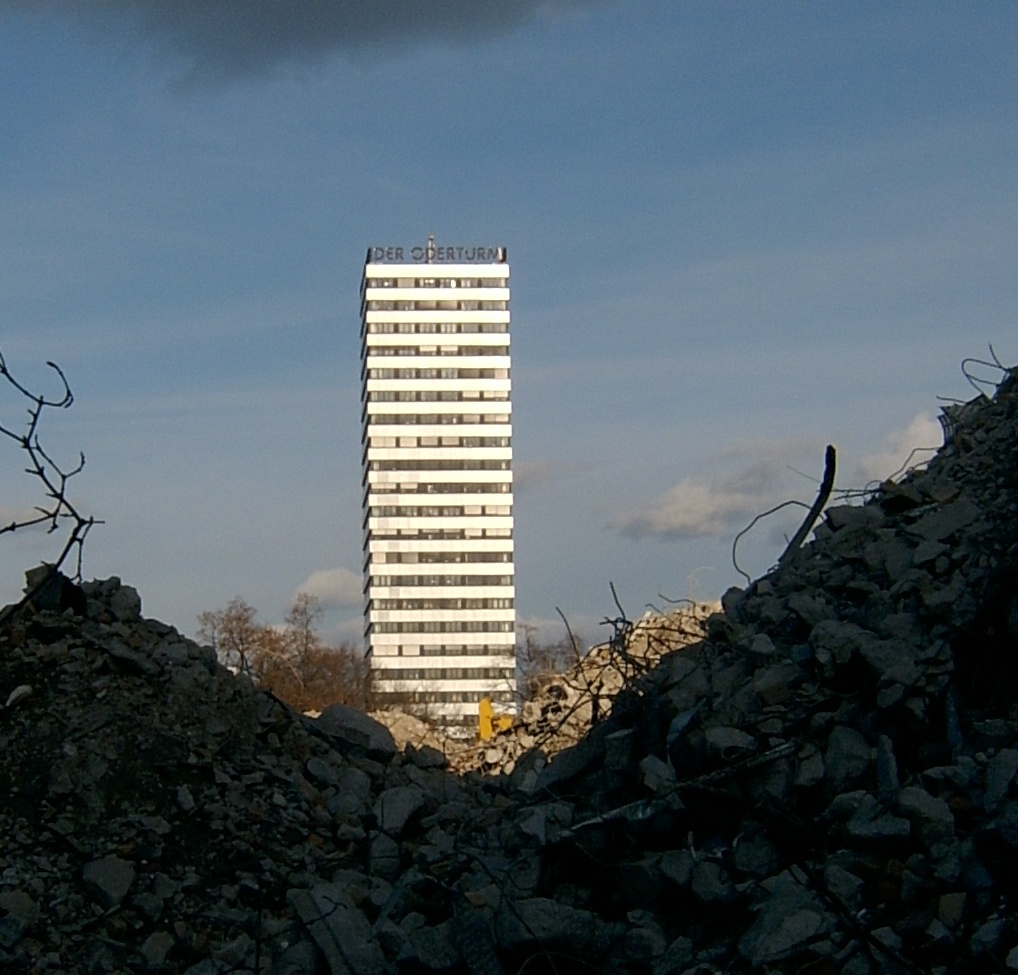

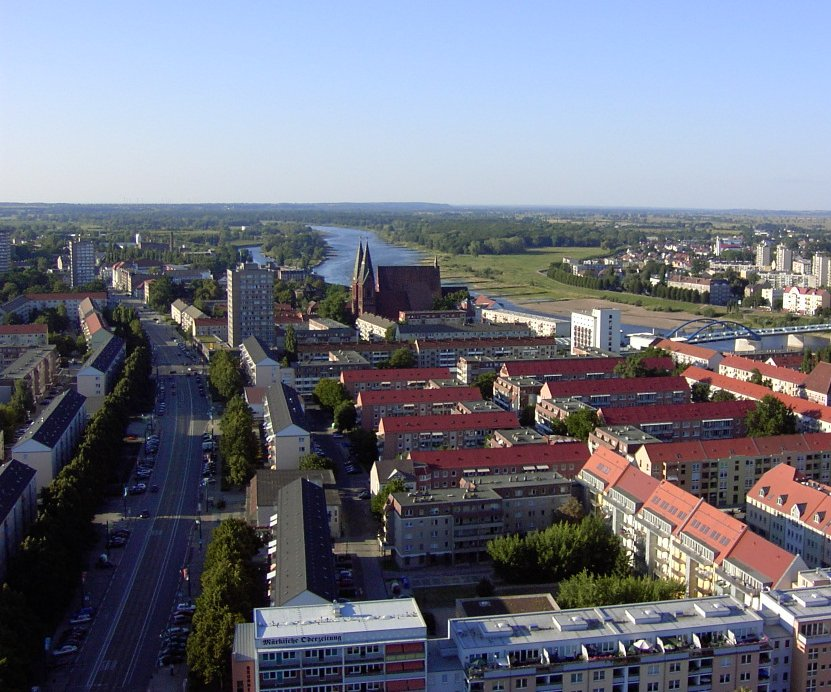
A view of Frankfurt from the top-floor cafe

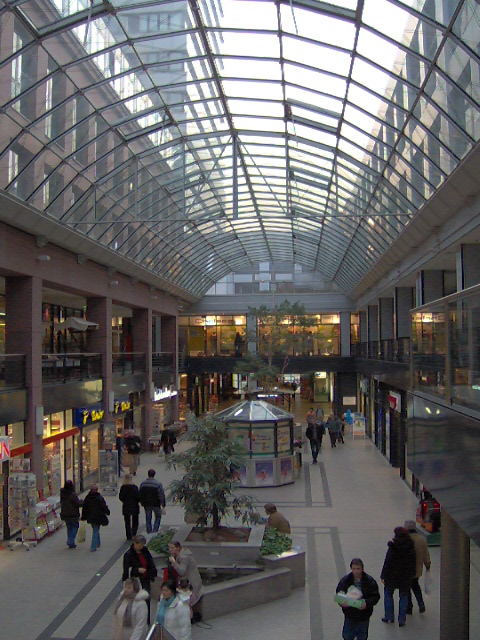
The enclosed shopping area

== See also ==
- Jen-Tower
- City-Hochhaus Leipzig
- Park Inn Berlin
- Fernsehturm
- Kulturfinger
