= JenTower =

Skyscraper in Jena, Germany

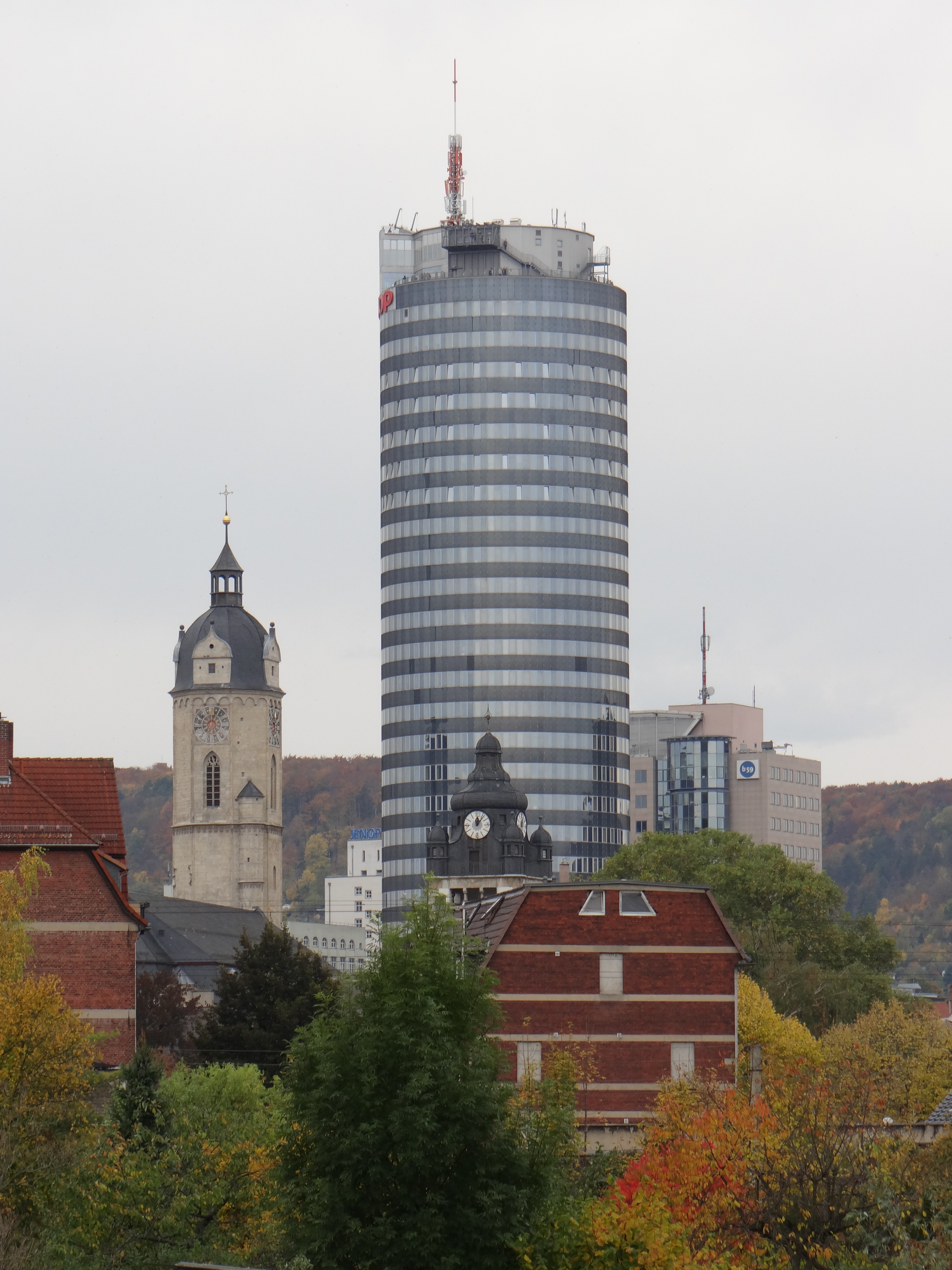
- Interactive map of the JenTower area

General information
- Type: Commercial offices
- Location: Jena, Thuringia, Germany
- Coordinates: 50°55′44″N 11°35′4.7″E
- Construction started: 1970
- Completed: 1972

Height
- Antenna spire: 159.6 m (524 ft)
- Roof: 144.5 m (474 ft)

Technical details
- Floor count: 29

Design and construction
- Architect: Hermann Henselmann

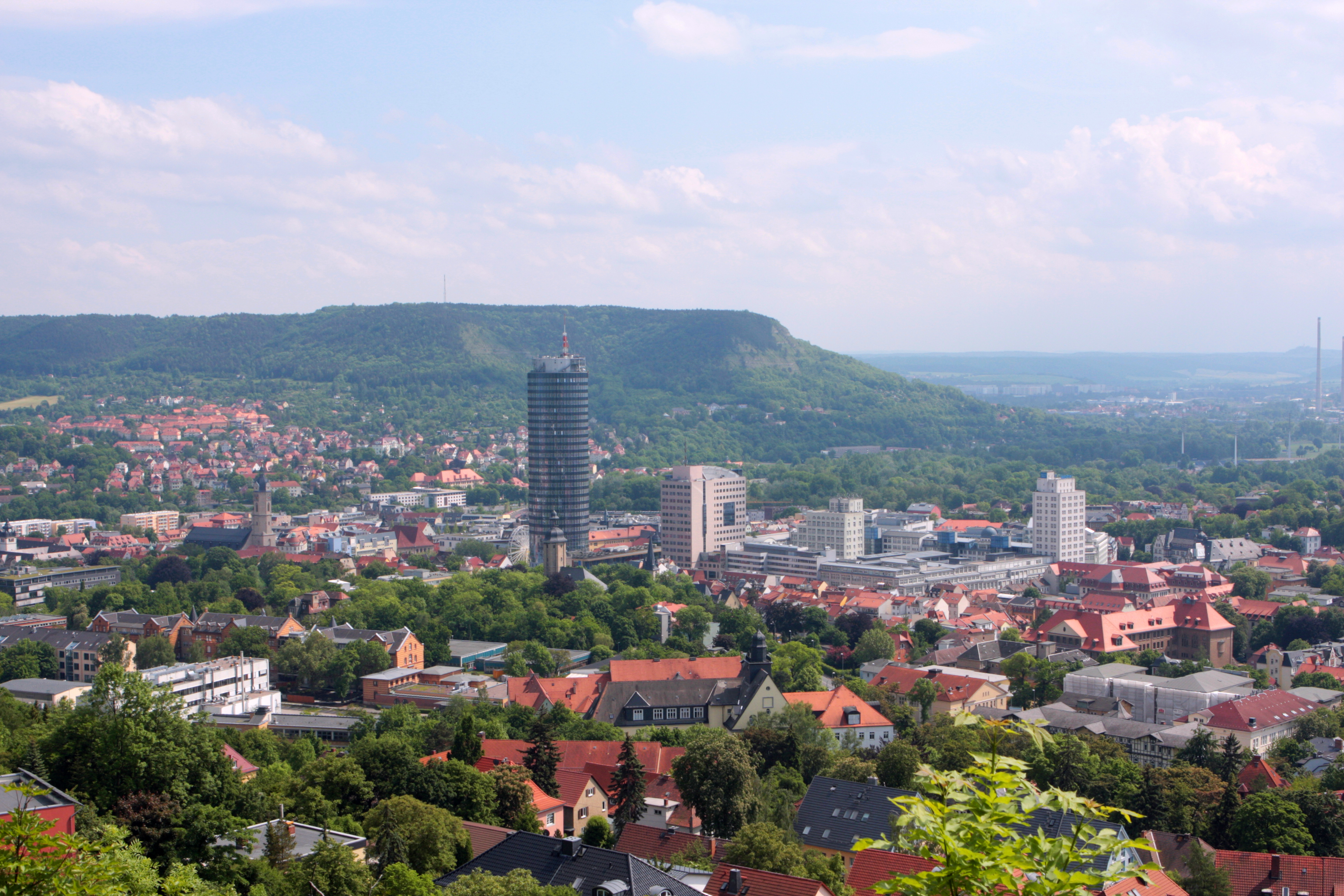
Skyline of Jena with JenTower

The JenTower is a skyscraper in Jena, Germany.

== Common names ==
The tower has been known by many names, official and unofficial. From 1992 until January 2005, the tower was called the Intershop Tower after its principal tenant, Intershop Communications AG. On November 30, 2004, the building was renamed the JenTower. Until 1995 the building was used by the Friedrich Schiller University of Jena, and therefore it is still colloquially known as the University Tower.

Further unofficial names include Phallus Jenensis, Cookie Roll (Keksrolle), University Tower (Uniturm) or the Henselmann tower, after the architect Hermann Henselmann. Often it is just called the tower.

== Buildings in vicinity ==
The JenTower stands directly opposite to the so-called Building 15, which was the first German highrise building. Building 15 was erected in to a height of 43 meters in 1915, based on plans by the architect Friedrich Puetzer (1871–1922). Other buildings in the neighborhood are Building 36 (today seat of the Jenoptik) and Building 59 (Carl Zeiss Jena Research building), likewise designed by Henselmann.

== Construction ==
The architect of the tower was Hermann Henselmann, one of the most famous architects of the former German Democratic Republic. The idea of a monolithic tower as an "urban crown" was developed by Bruno Taut, who was city architect in Magdeburg in the 1920s.

Construction began in June 1969, in a residential and business quarter spared by the Second World War. The foundation stone was laid on April 30, 1970. Construction took place in sliding scarf building method, and was completed on October 2, 1972 at the original height of 127 meters. The circular tower is a reinforced concrete construction with two basements, a 3.20-meter-thick mat foundation and a diameter of 33 meters.

In 1968‐1969 there were also state plans to build a recreation center for VEB Zeiss workers next to the tower. This additional building would have displaced the historical Collegium Jenese cloister. These plans were scrapped due to protests of the locals, in particular those of microbiologist Hans Knöll, and due to the poor financial shape of VEB Zeiss at the time. Even the tower itself proved too expensive for VEB Zeiss to maintain, and it was moved into the property of the University of Jena after it was completed, despite the University's protestations.

In 1999 the building was sold to an investor, who completed a modernization in 2001. At this time, two additional floors and a UMTS antenna were added, and the 28th and 29th floors were converted into a restaurant. Including the antenna the tower reaches 159 meters. The building was the second tallest in East Germany after the City Hochhaus Leipzig, and after two additional stories were added in 2001, became the tallest in former East Germany. It is currently the 28th-highest in Germany. All 27 that are taller are in former West Germany.

== See also ==
- Oderturm
- City-Hochhaus Leipzig
- Park Inn Berlin
- Fernsehturm
- Kulturfinger
