= Hochhaus an der Weberwiese =

Coordinates: 52.515036°N 13.443846°E

- Hochhaus an der Weberwiese
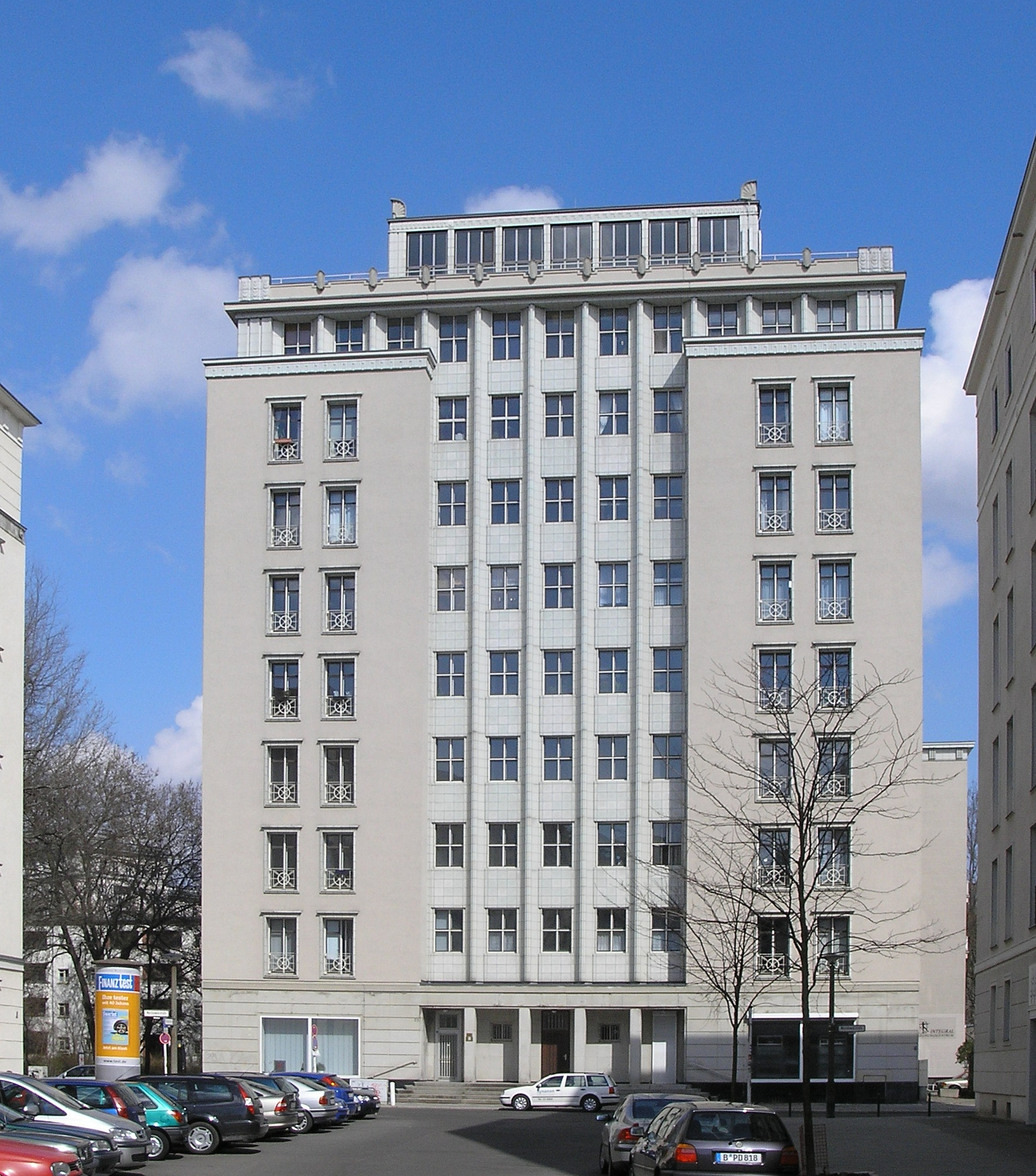
- Interactive map of the Hochhaus an der Weberwiese area

General information
- Type: Residential
- Architectural style: Socialist Classicism
- Location: Weberwiese, Berlin-Friedrichshain, Germany
- Construction started: 1951
- Completed: 1952

Technical details
- Floor count: 9

Design and construction
- Architect: Hermann Henselmann

The Hochhaus an der Weberwiese (German pronunciation: [ˈhoːxˌhaʊs ʔan deːɐ̯ ˈveːbɐˌviːzə], lit. 'high house on the weaver's meadow') is a residential building in Berlin, located in the district of Friedrichshain.

Built as part of the plan for post-war reconstruction, it was the first example of socialist classicism in the German Democratic Republic.

Above the main doorway is a quotation from Bertolt Brecht:

Friede in unserem Lande,
Friede in unserer Stadt,
daß sie den gut behause,
der sie gebauet hat.

== History ==
The construction of a "high house" in the garden of Weberwiese was decided as part of the reconstruction plan of the district of Friedrichshain, devastated by the bombings of World War II.

The overall design of the new complex was laid by Hans Scharoun, who also personally executed some buildings, taking up the style of the "new objectivity", typical of the 1920s and 1930s.

This choice, however, was strongly criticized at the political level: the government of the newly formed GDR (East Germany) in fact preferred to direct the reconstruction following the principles of socialist classicism, typical of the Soviet Union of those years, advocating a return to "national traditions".

Therefore, the draft of the "high house", written by Hermann Henselmann in the functionalist style, was completely redesigned, adopting a neoclassical style going back to Schinkel's buildings of the nineteenth century.

Built from 1951 to 1952, the "high house" rose to the symbol of the reconstruction a symbol of reconstruction in the GDR, and came to be a model for similar interventions in Berlin and other cities of the Republic.

== Bibliography ==
- Lorenzo Spagnoli (1993). Berlino. XIX e XX secolo. Bologna: Zanichelli. p. 239. ISBN 88-08-14174-8.
- AA.VV. (2001). Architekturführer Berlin (in German) (6 ed.). Berlin: Dietrich Reimer Verlag. p. 284. ISBN 3-496-01211-0.
