= Hermann Henselmann =

German architect (1905–1995)

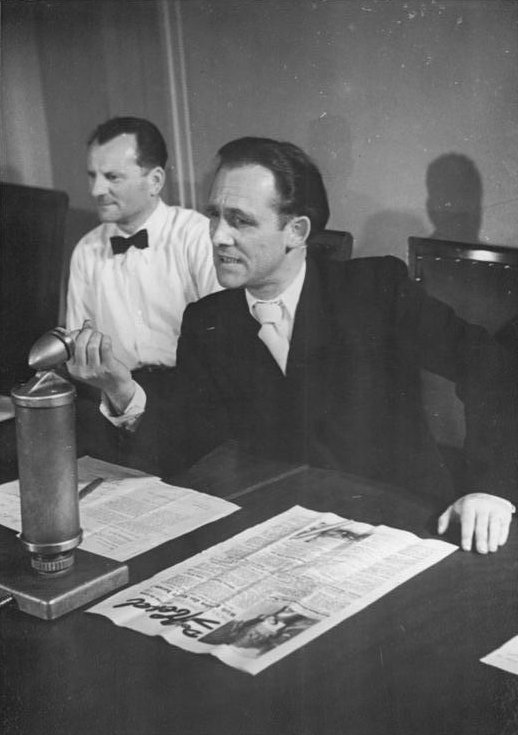
- Henselmann in 1949
- Born: 3 February 1905; Roßla, Prussia, German Empire
- Died: 19 January 1995 (aged 89); Berlin, Germany
- Education: Kunstgewerbeschule Berlin
- Occupation: Architect

Hermann Henselmann (3 February 1905 – 19 January 1995) was a German architect most famous for his buildings constructed in East Germany during the 1950s and 1960s.

== Early years ==
Henselmann was born in Roßla and studied at the Kunstgewerbeschule in Berlin from 1922 to 1925. His early projects, such as a house on Lake Geneva near Montreux (1930) were Modernist in style, showing a clear Bauhaus influence, and due to this and Henselmann's partly Jewish ancestry he was prevented from working as a private architect by the Nazi government.

== Socialist Realism ==
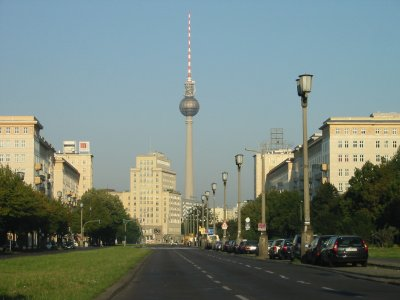
Karl-Marx-Allee, towards Strausberger Platz. The TV tower at Alexanderplatz is visible in the background. (The initial design concept for the tower was created by Henselmann.)

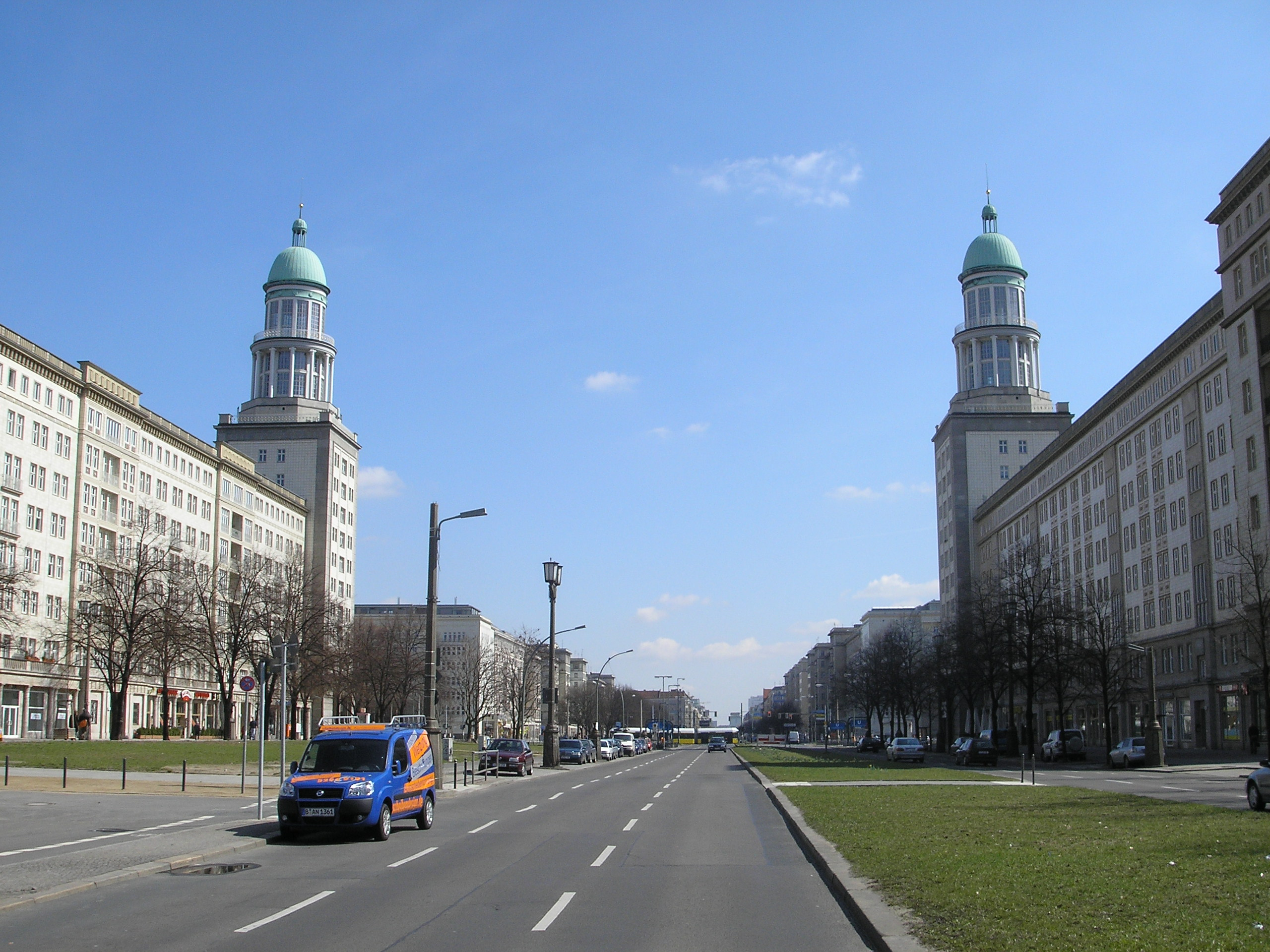
Frankfurter Tor, Berlin

After the war he was appointed head architect in the city of Gotha and later in Weimar in the Soviet Zone of Germany, although his projects were subjected to harsh criticism for their Modernism. He served in Hans Scharoun's town planning group that tried to convert the Socialist Unity Party of Germany's leaders to Modernism, although unlike Scharoun, Henselmann stayed in East Berlin after their rejection. His neo-classical Weberwiese building in Berlin, emblazoned with quotes from his friend Bertolt Brecht (who had personally convinced him not to leave for the West) announced his conversion to the historical revivalism of the style known as Socialist Realism or Stalinist architecture. Henselmann would subsequently design the towers that cap each end of the Stalinallee boulevard (renamed Karl-Marx-Allee in the 1960s) at Frankfurter Tor and Strausberger Platz, which showed the influence of Karl Friedrich Schinkel as well as the 'Seven Sisters', the Stalinist 'wedding cake' skyscrapers in Moscow.

== Return to Modernism ==
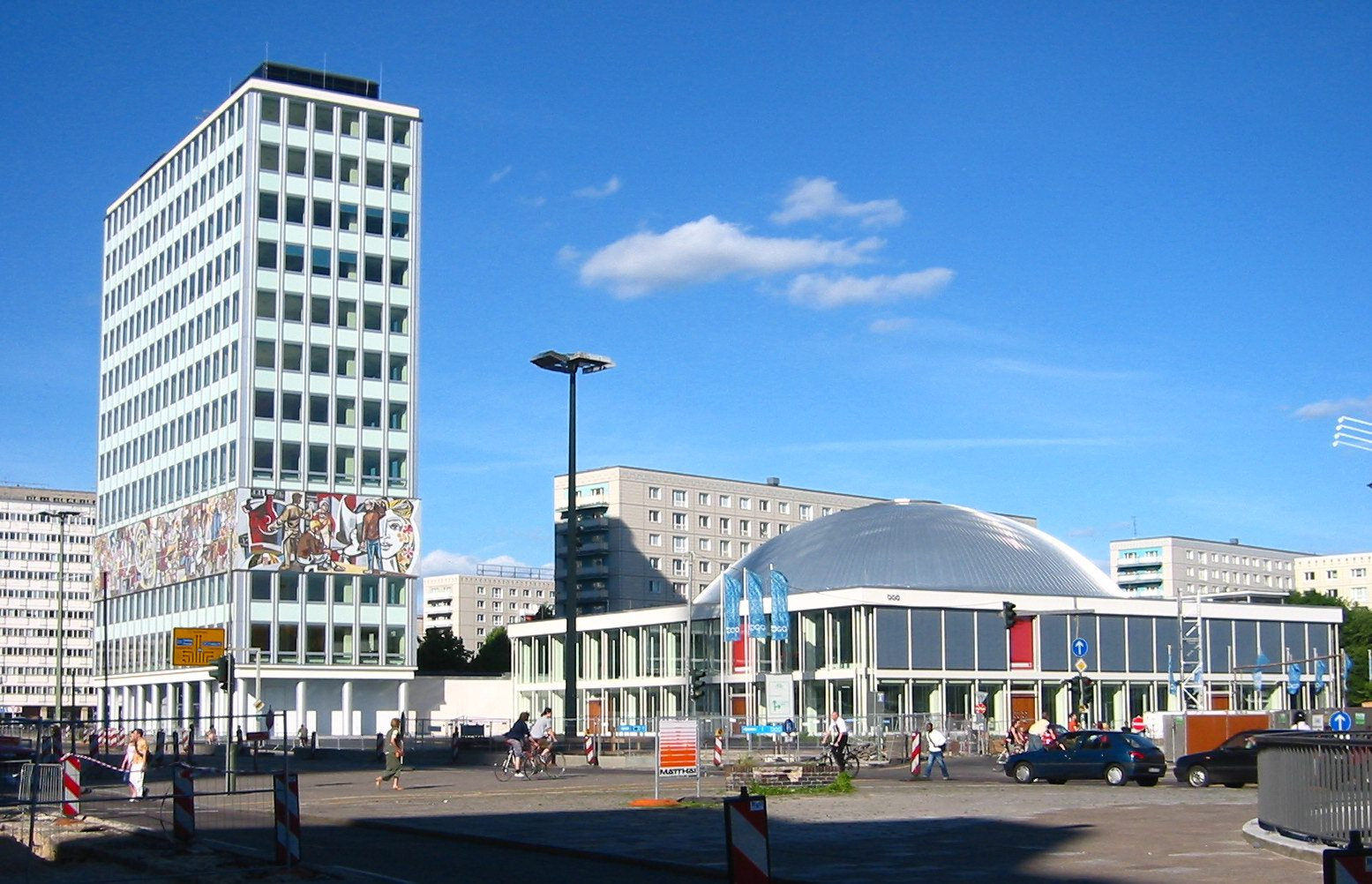
Haus des Lehrers and Congress Hall, Berlin

Henselmann was appointed head architect for the city of Berlin in 1953 and held various town planning positions until his retirement. After Joseph Stalin's death and the rehabilitation of Modernism, Henselmann returned to his earlier concerns, designing flagship buildings for East Berlin such as the Haus des Lehrers (House of Teachers) and Congress Hall in Alexanderplatz and the housing complex of Leninplatz (which was renamed Platz der Vereinten Nationen or United Nations Square in 1992, and its large statue of Lenin removed). Plans for a 'Signal Tower' drafted in 1958 became early drafts for the vast Fernsehturm, finished in 1969. Other late projects in a modernist and high rise style included the cylindrical Jen-Tower in Jena and a tower for the Leipzig University in the shape of an open book. Henselmann's later projects gave a modern, technocratic face to the German Democratic Republic, akin to the skyscrapers being built at the time in Frankfurt. He dismissed the brief period of Socialist Realism as a 'childhood illness', though his buildings on Karl-Marx-Allee are now protected monuments. Henselmann retired as an architect in 1972, and died in Berlin.

== Selected buildings ==
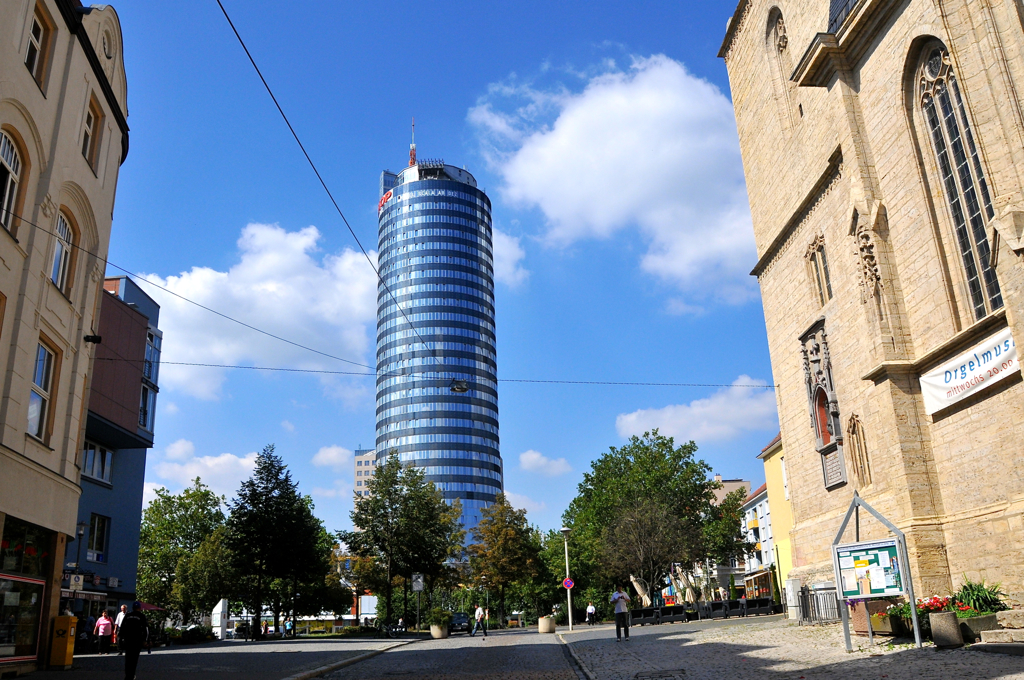
Jen-Tower, Jena

- 1929-1931: Villa Kenwin, La Tour-de-Peilz, Chemin du Vallon 19, 1820 Montreux; (Switzerland), with Alexander Ferenczy
- 1931–1932: Heinecke House, Kleinmachnow (near Berlin)
- 1945: Concept for "Neubauernsiedlung Großfurra", a settlement for farmers on newly cleared farms, with 30 residential hutches of the type "Thüringen" – first such settlement after World War II in Germany
- 1951: Hochhaus an der Weberwiese, Berlin
- 1953–1956: Towers on Frankfurter Tor and Strausberger Platz, Karl-Marx-Allee, Berlin
- 1958: Study for a TV Tower (early version of the Berlin TV Tower, 1969)
- 1961–1964: Haus des Lehrers, Alexanderplatz, Berlin
- 1968–1970: Leninplatz, Berlin (since 1992: Platz der Vereinten Nationen)
- 1968: City-Hochhaus Leipzig, formerly University of Leipzig
- 1972: Jen-Tower, Jena
