= Fernsehturm Berlin =

Television tower in Berlin

Berliner Fernsehturm

- The Fernsehturm in 2015

- Location within Berlin

General information
- Status: Completed
- Type: Television tower, Restaurant, Observation tower
- Location: Berlin, Germany
- Coordinates: 52°31′15″N 013°24′34″E
- Construction started: 1965
- Completed: 3 October 1969; 57 years ago

Height
- Height: 368.03 m (1,207.45 ft)

Design and construction
- Architect: Hermann Henselmann
- Main contractor: Government of East Germany

Website
- tv-turm.de

The Fernsehturm (German: [ˈfɛɐ̯nzeːˌtʊɐ̯m]; lit. 'Television Tower') in central Berlin was constructed between 1965 and 1969 by the government of the German Democratic Republic as both a functional broadcasting facility and a symbol of communist power.

It remains a landmark today from its position next to Alexanderplatz in the city's Marien Quarter, part of the district of Mitte, visible across most suburban districts of Berlin. With a height of 368 metres (1,207 ft) (including antenna) it is the tallest structure in Germany, and the third-tallest structure in the European Union. When built it was the fourth-tallest freestanding structure in the world after the Empire State Building and the John Hancock Center.

Of the four tallest structures in the European Union, the Fernsehturm is two metres (6 1/2 feet) shorter than the Torreta de Guardamar, 0.5 m (1 ft 8 in) shorter than the Riga Radio and TV Tower, and 8 m (26 ft) taller than the Trbovlje Power Station. The structure is also more than 220 m (720 ft) higher than the old Berlin Radio Tower in the western part of the city, which was built in the 1920s.

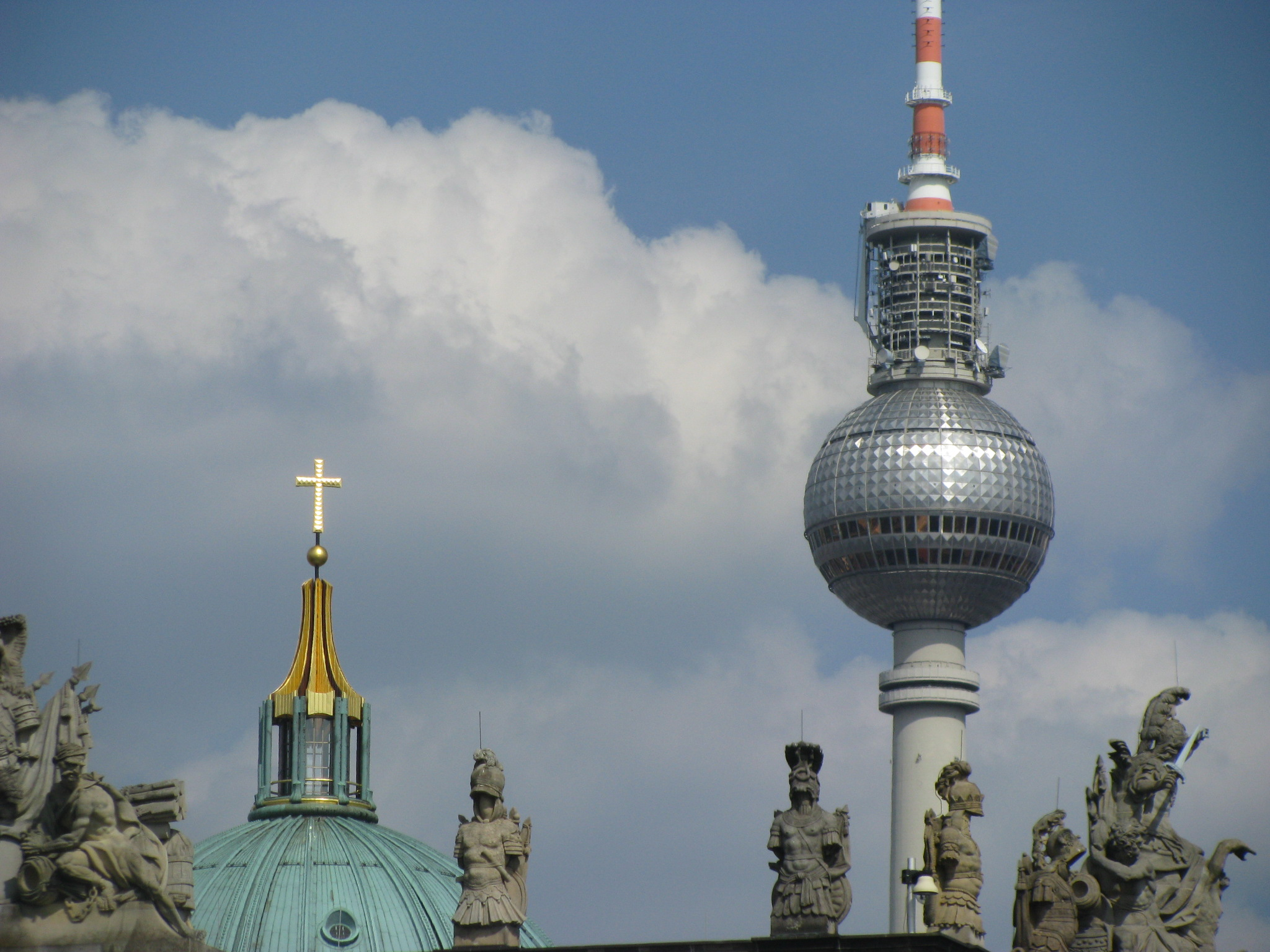
Crosses of Berliner Dom and Berliner fernsehturm

In addition to its main function as the location of several radio and television transmitters, the building – internally known as "Fernmeldeturm 32" – serves as a viewing tower with an observation deck including a bar at a height of 203 metres (666 ft), as well as a rotating restaurant. Also, the Berlin TV Tower can be booked as a venue for events. The distinctive city landmark has undergone a radical, symbolic transformation: After German reunification, it changed from a politically charged, national symbol of the GDR into a citywide symbol of a reunited Berlin. Due to its universal and timeless design, it has increasingly been used as a trademark and is identified worldwide with Berlin and Germany. In 1979, the Berlin TV Tower received official monument status by the East German government, a status which was perpetuated after the German reunification.

The tower has become one of the most prominent symbols of the country and is often in the establishing shot of films set in Berlin, alongside monuments such as the Brandenburg Gate, the Berlin Victory Column and the Reichstag building. It is also one of the ten most popular attractions in Germany with more than one million visitors every year.

== Overview ==
The original total height of the tower was 365 metres (1,198 ft), but it rose to 368 metres (1,207 ft) with the installation of a new antenna in 1997. The Fernsehturm was the fourth tallest free-standing structure in Europe, after Moscow's Ostankino Tower, the Kyiv TV Tower and the Riga Radio and TV Tower. The sphere is a visitor platform and a revolving restaurant in the middle of the sphere. The visitor platform, also called panoramic floor, is at a height of about 203 metres (666 ft) above the ground and visibility can reach 42 kilometres (26 mi) on a clear day. The restaurant "Sphere", which rotates once every 30 minutes, is a few metres (yards) above the visitors platform at 207 metres (679 ft). When first constructed, it turned once per hour; the speed was later doubled following the tower's 1997 renovation.

Two lifts transport visitors to the sphere of the tower within 40 seconds. There is also a stairway with 986 steps. Wheelchair users cannot visit the tower due to fire regulations.

To mark the 2006 FIFA World Cup in Germany, for which the final match was played in the Berlin Olympic Stadium, the sphere was decorated as a football with magenta-coloured pentagons, reflecting the corporate colour of World Cup sponsor and owner of the Fernsehturm, Deutsche Telekom.

== Location and surroundings ==
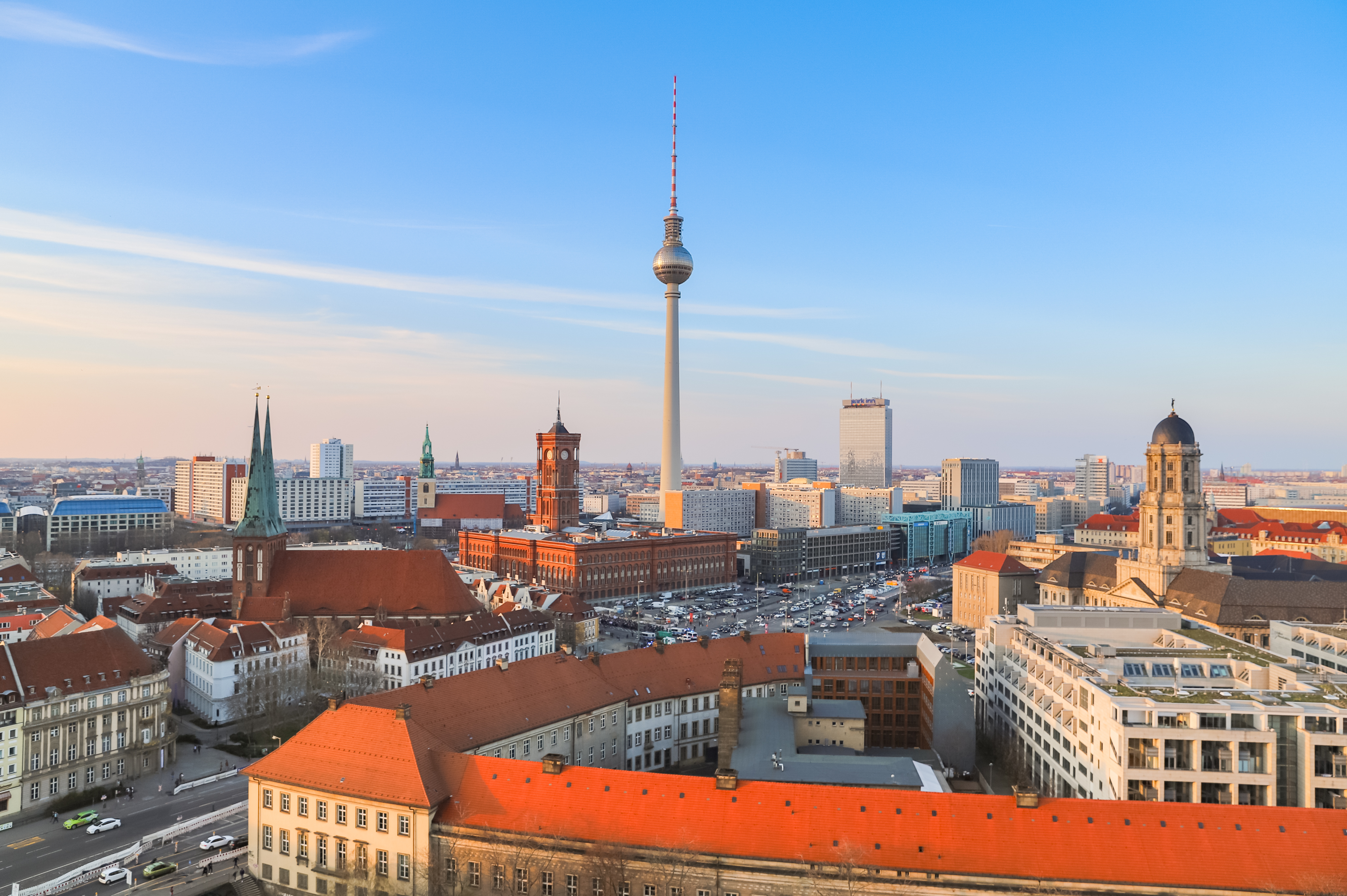
Fernsehturm Berlin close to Alexanderplatz in Berlin-Mitte

The Berlin TV Tower is located southwest of the Alexanderplatz station, east of the St. Mary's Church and northeast of the Marx-Engels Forum. The structure is often erroneously described as being part of the Alexanderplatz that lies to the northeast.

In addition to the Berlin U-Bahn and S-Bahn lines, several tram and bus lines stop at Alexanderplatz station, from which the middle exit leads to the entrance building of the TV Tower.

The Interhotel Stadt Berlin on Alexanderplatz, planned concurrently to the TV Tower and completed in 1970, is 125 metres (410 ft) high and is now operated as a Park Inn by Radisson Berlin Alexanderplatz. Between 1967 and 1972, the Rathauspassagen shopping arcade was built next to the Rotes Rathaus, directly south of the TV Tower.

== History ==
=== Background ===
At the European Broadcasting Conference in Stockholm in 1952, which was responsible for the coordination of frequency waves in Europe, the GDR – not recognised politically by most countries at the time – was only allocated two frequency channels. Under these circumstances, it was impossible to cover Berlin's urban area by multiple small broadcasting stations without interference and thus disturbances or gaps in the broadcasting signals. For comprehensive and continuous coverage, a powerful large broadcasting facility at the highest possible location was required. In the 1950s, this task was fulfilled in Berlin by the fragile makeshift stations of Deutscher Fernsehfunk (East German broadcasting organisation).

As early as 1952, GDR's Deutsche Post began planning a TV tower for Berlin. The plans initially involved a location in the southeast of Berlin. However, the project was interrupted after construction had started, when it transpired that the site was only 8 kilometres (5 mi) away from the Berlin Schönefeld Airport (now part of Berlin Brandenburg Airport) and the tower threatened to jeopardise flight operations due to its height and location at the edge of an airport corridor. After various compromise solutions failed, the construction project was discontinued in 1956. In the following years, alternatives were sought and several sites were discussed, including in Berlin Friedrichshain, but these plans also fell victim to austerity measures triggered by the high costs of building the Berlin Wall.

In the next few years, the search for a new location was continued. Alongside its actual purpose of providing the best possible broadcasting services, the role of the tower as a new landmark of Berlin was increasingly gaining significance. For this reason, in 1964 the government demanded that the tower be built at a central location, an appeal that was supported by the SED leadership. Ultimately, the choice of location was a political decision. Walter Ulbricht, leader of the Socialist Unity Party which governed East Germany, decided to allow the construction of a television tower modelled on the Fernsehturm Stuttgart and the first artificial Earth satellite, Sputnik.

Various architects were involved in the planning and implementation of the tower between 1965 and 1969, including Hermann Henselmann and Jörg Streitparth, Fritz Dieter, Günter Franke and Werner Ahrendt, as well as Walter Herzog, Gerhard Kosel and Herbert Aust. The construction of the Tower and the surrounding Pavilion building at its base resulted in the razing and clearing of a huge section of the historic centre of the capital of Germany. A medieval church stands next to the tower as a testament to the destruction of the old city.

=== Construction of the Tower ===
Work on the foundation began on 4 August 1965 and was finished by the end of 1965. The concreting of the tower foot began on 15 March 1966. The concreting progressed rapidly, so that the 100-metre (330 ft) mark was exceeded on 4 October 1966. The shaft reached its final height on 16 June 1967. A total of 8,000 cubic metres (10,000 cu. yd.) of concrete was used to build the shaft, which was 248.78 metres (816.2 ft) high and weighed 26,000 tons.

While the shaft was being erected, the preliminary work for the tower ball progressed. The working group VEB Ipro had worked out the procedure for assembling the ball on the reinforced concrete shaft, according to which the ball could be pieced together from 120 separate segments on the ground. In April 1967, a 35-metre (115 ft) high replica of the shaft was erected on the construction site between Marienkirche and the Red Town Hall on which the ball segments were pre-assembled. This work lasted until November 1967. The construction costs had meanwhile skyrocketed from an estimated 33 million to 95 million marks, caused mainly by components and materials that had to be paid in foreign currencies, some of which were imported from West Germany. In February 1968, the assembly of the ball on the shaft was started. The last segment of the ball was finally installed on 7 October. A spike was mounted on the tower structure and the antenna structure above the ball, so that work on the interior could be started the following year.

At the beginning of 1969, water trickled into the interior of the tower, causing considerable damage; the ball had to be sealed again. Until 3 October 1969, the interior was expanded, and the entrance pavilion was completed. After 53 months of actual construction work, the tower was completed in "record-breaking" time in spite of all the adversities. The costs amounted to over 132 million marks.

The building, officially called the Fernseh- und UKW-Turm Berlin (Television and VHF Tower Berlin), was the world's second highest television tower in October 1969. The only TV tower that was taller was the Ostankino in Moscow. It was also the third-highest freestanding building of its time, after the tower in Moscow and the Empire State Building in New York.

=== Since the inauguration ===
On 3 October 1969 Walter Ulbricht, together with his wife Lotte and a delegation of high-ranking companions, including Günter Mittag, Herbert Warnke, Paul Verner, Rudolph Schulze, Erich Honecker, Werner Lamberz and Erich Mielke, inaugurated the television tower and gave the starting signal for GDR's second state channel, DFF 2, thus launching colour TV on two channels in the GDR. The tower has been accessible to the public since 7 October 1969, Republic Day.

From 16 February 1970, five FM programmes were broadcast from the tower; a first television programme followed on 4 April 1970. At the beginning of 1972, the two planned pavilions for exhibitions, the Berlin Information Centre, a cinema and gastronomic facilities were completed. Overall, the restaurants offered space for around 1000 guests. After the establishment of a legal basis for the preservation of monuments in 1975, the Berlin TV Tower was awarded this status in 1979. After the fall of the GDR, the Federal Republic of Germany enshrined the building's monument status.

After German reunification in 1990, voices were raised favouring the demolition of the tower. The Federal Republic of Germany decided to keep the building. As the new operator, Deutsche Telekom finally invested more than 50 million marks to overhaul the broadcasting facilities, and a number of renovations were also undertaken on the building. Among other things, the antenna received a new, more powerful tip from the height of 327 metres (1,073 ft), increasing the tower's height from originally 365 to 368 metres (1,198 to 1,207 ft) in summer 1997.

The TV Tower is one of the buildings in Berlin that is illuminated by a special light installation for several days during the Festival of Lights held every year in October since 2004. On the occasion of the 2006 FIFA World Cup, the tower ball was covered to make it look like a magenta football as part of an advertising campaign by the operator Telekom.

== "Pope's Revenge" ==
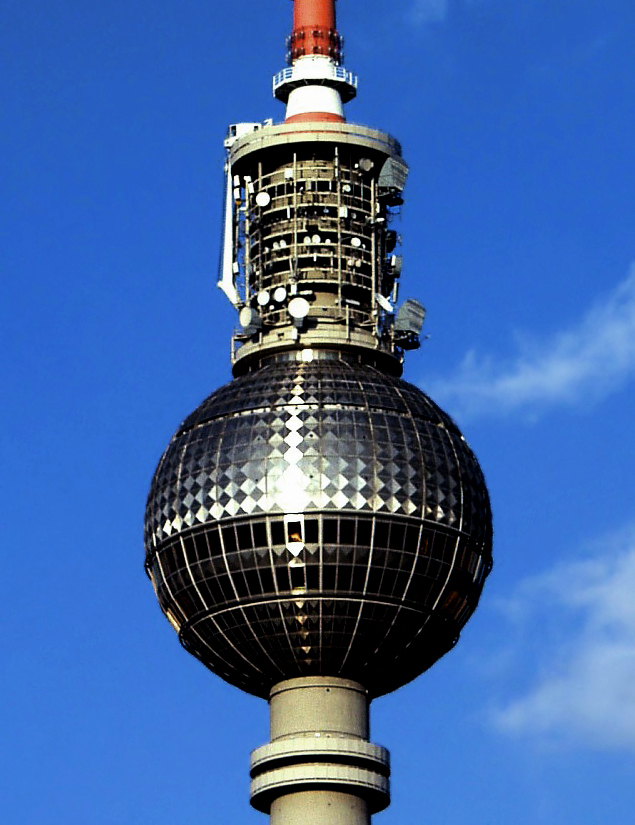
The "Pope's Revenge"

When the sun shines on the Fernsehturm's tiled stainless-steel dome, the reflection usually appears in the form of a Greek cross. Berliners nicknamed the luminous cross Rache des Papstes, or the "Pope's Revenge", believing the Christian symbol a divine retaliation for the government's removal of crosses from East Berlin's churches. For the same reasons, the structure was also called "St. Walter" (from Walter Ulbricht). U.S. President Ronald Reagan mentioned this in his Tear down this wall speech on 12 June 1987.

== Gallery ==
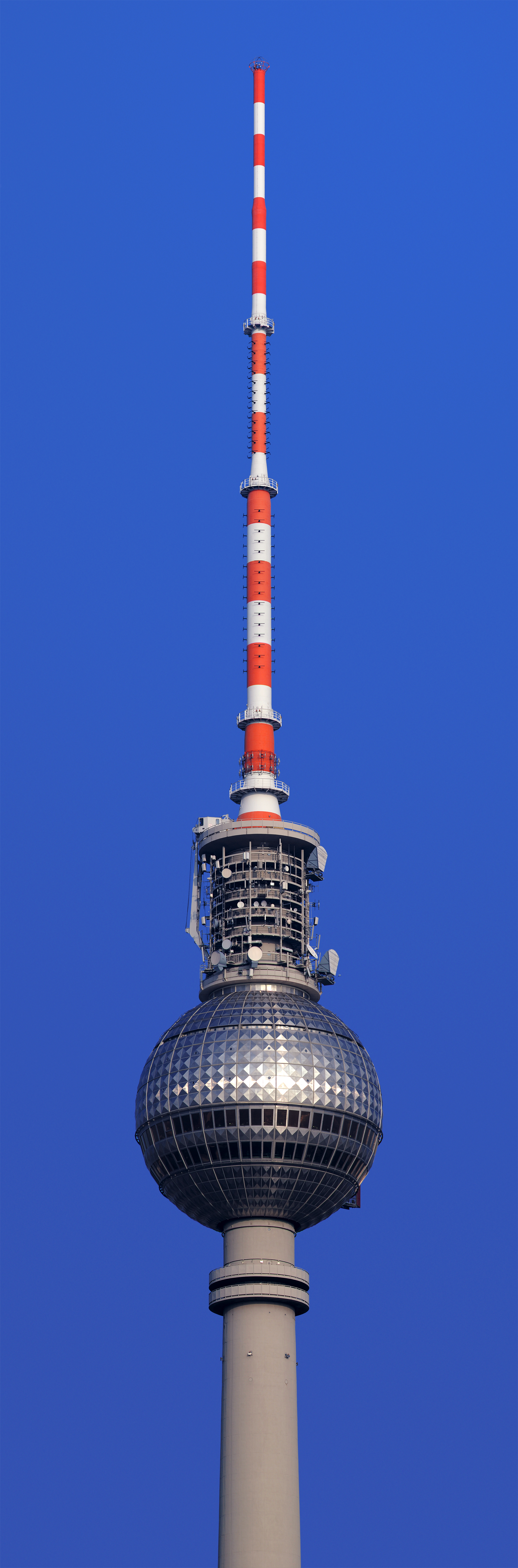
Sphere and spire of the Fernsehturm

The distinctive outline of the Fernsehturm is sometimes used for logos.

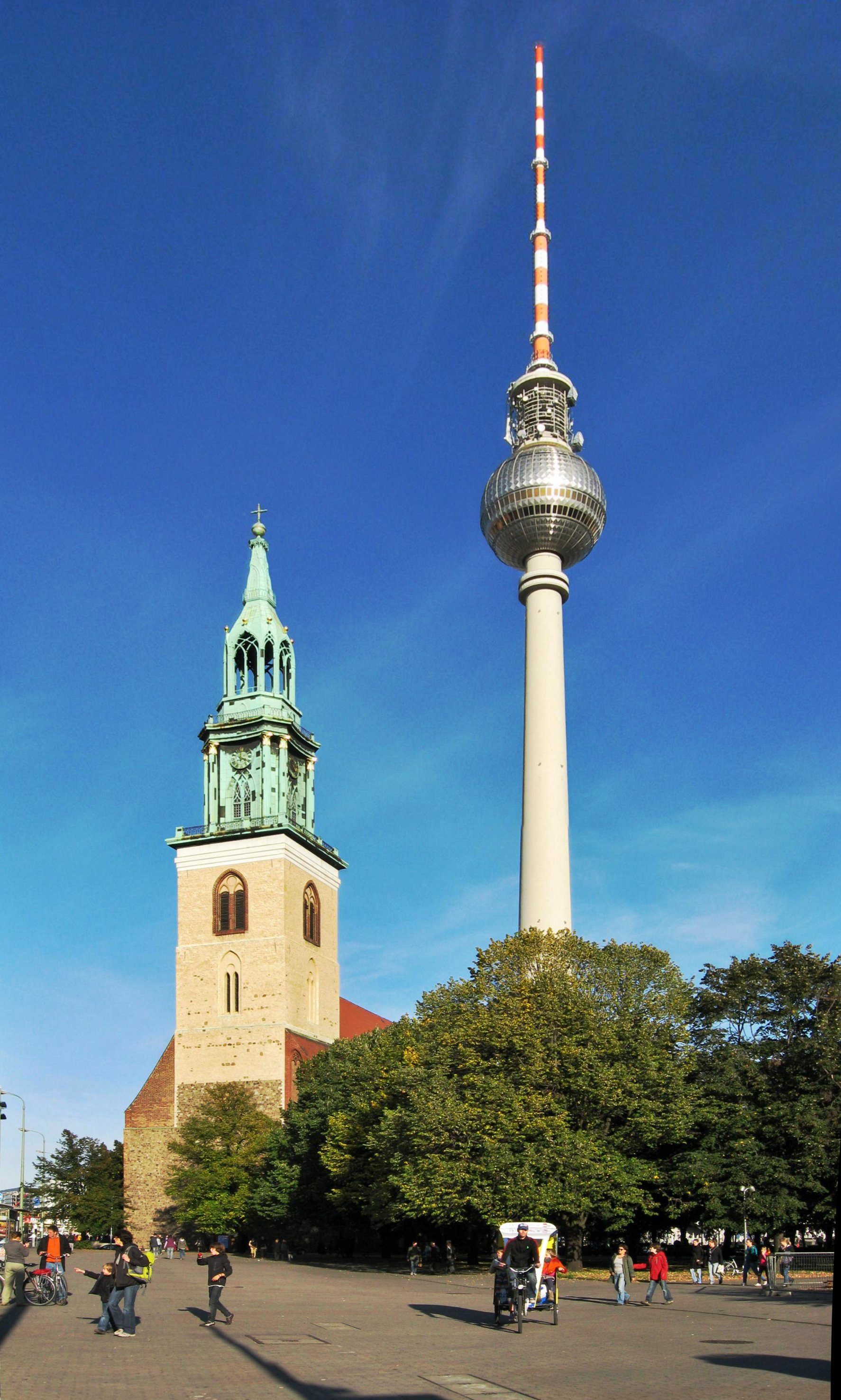
Berlin TV Tower with St. Mary's Church

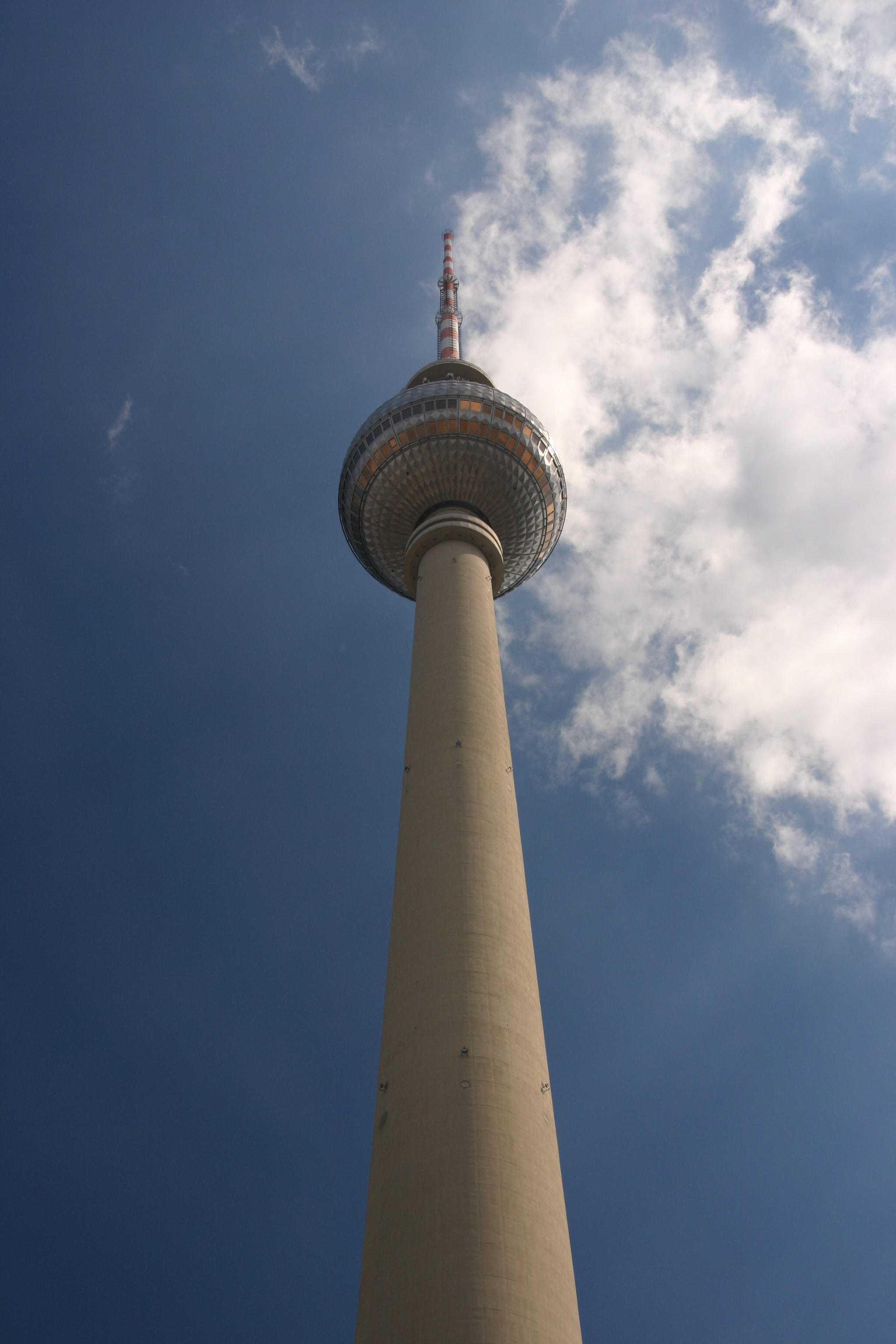
View from side

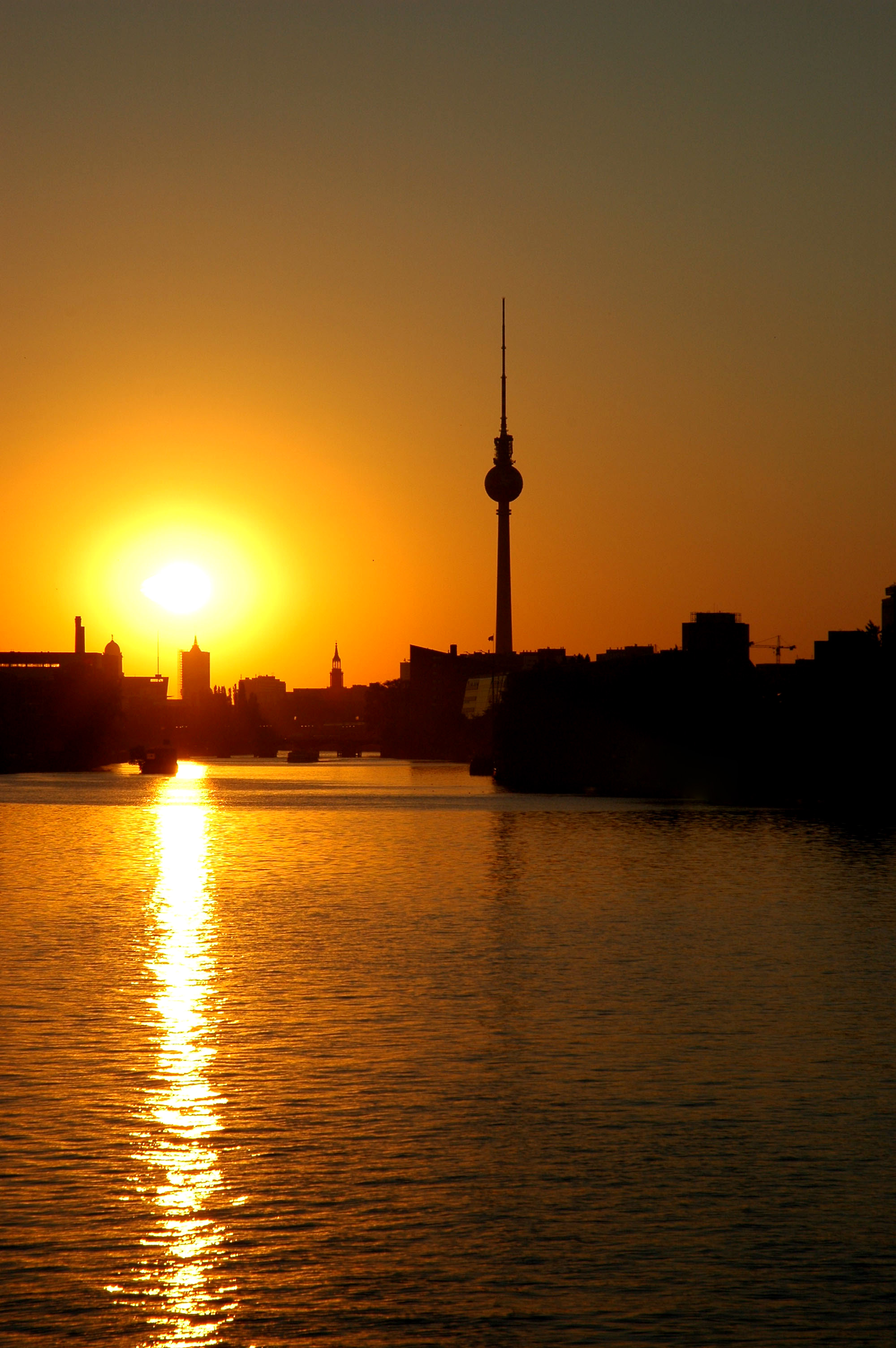
Berlin TV Tower at sunset

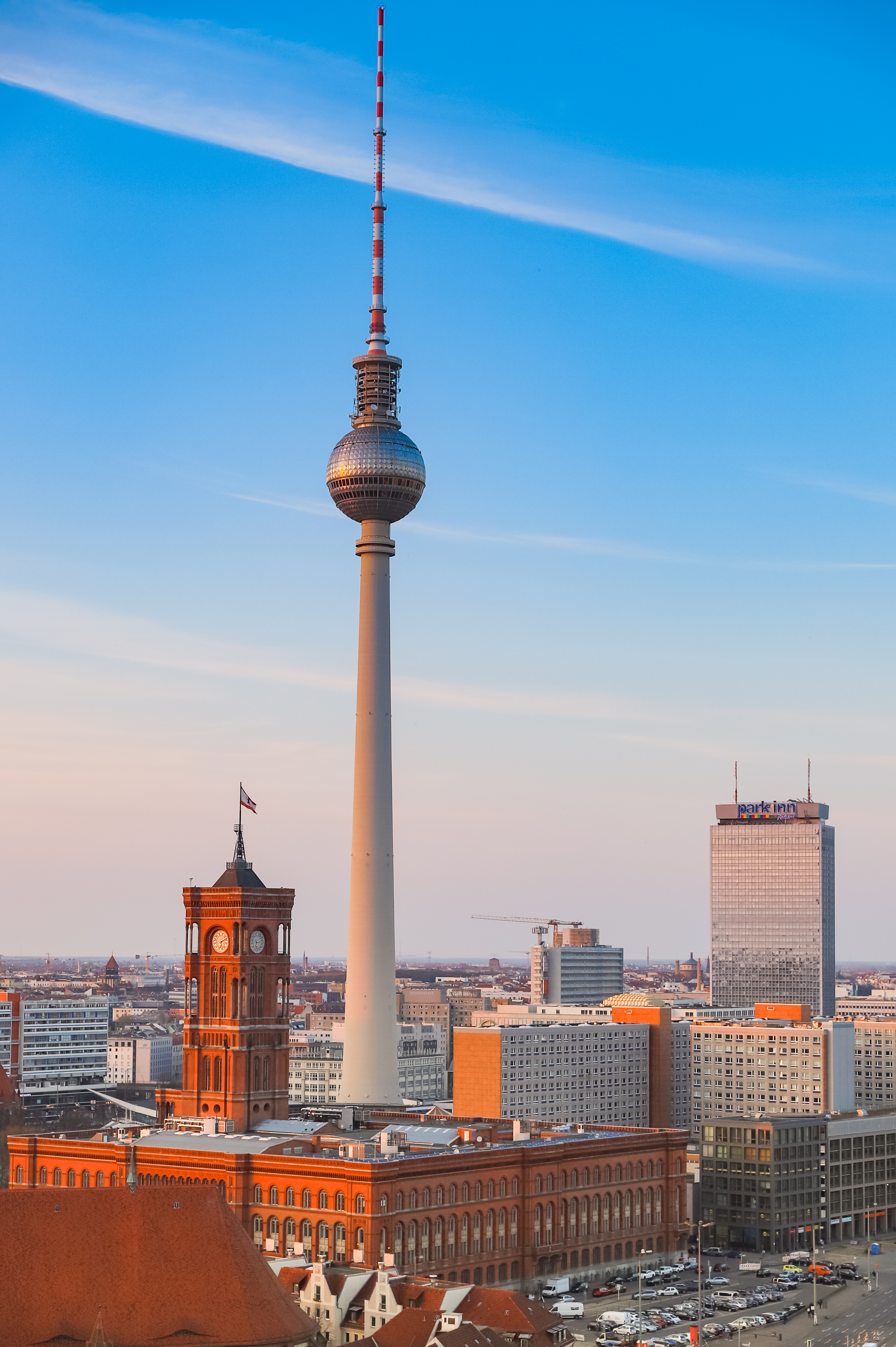
Fernsehturm in the background of the old Berlin city hall

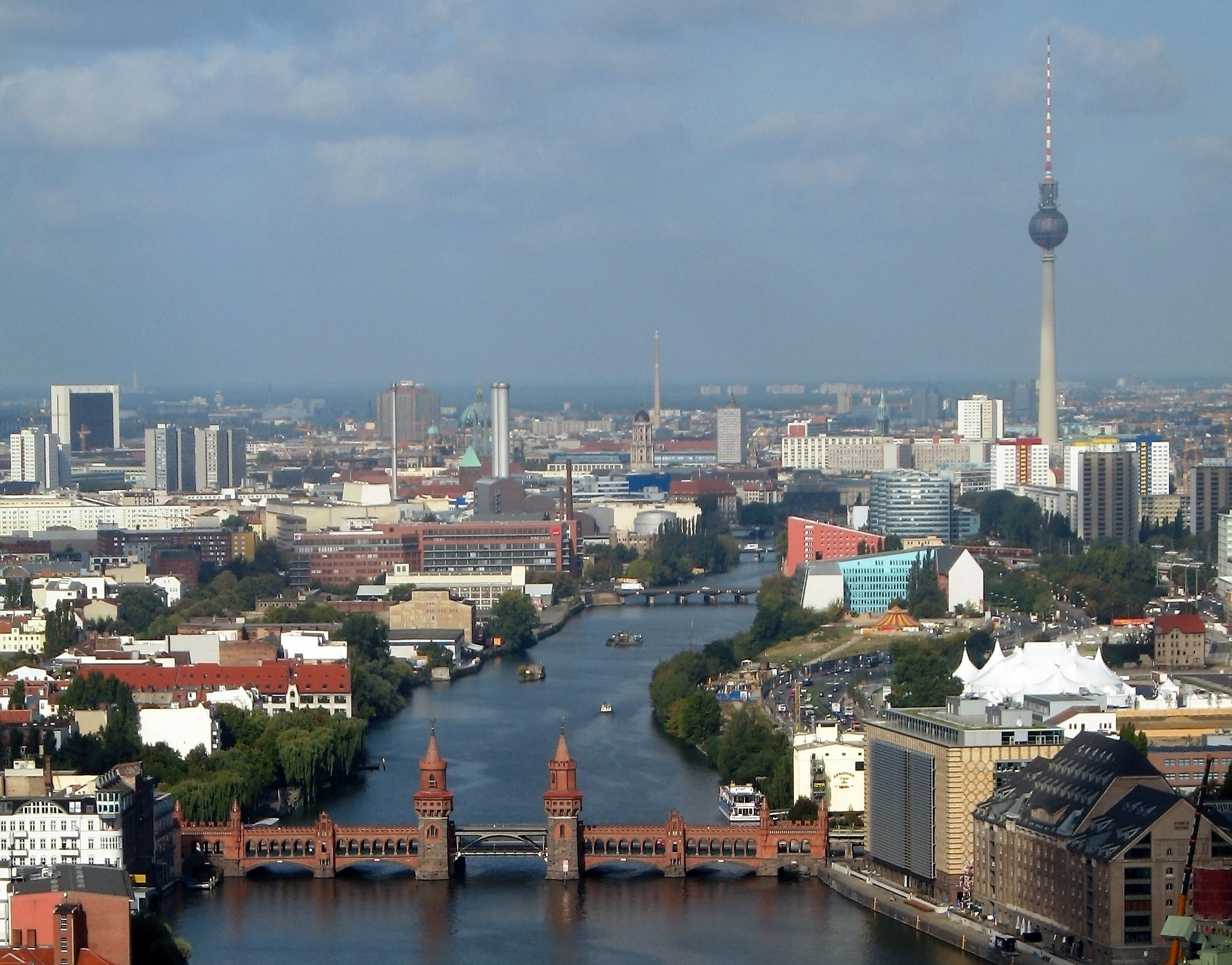
Central Berlin with Oberbaum Bridge and TV Tower

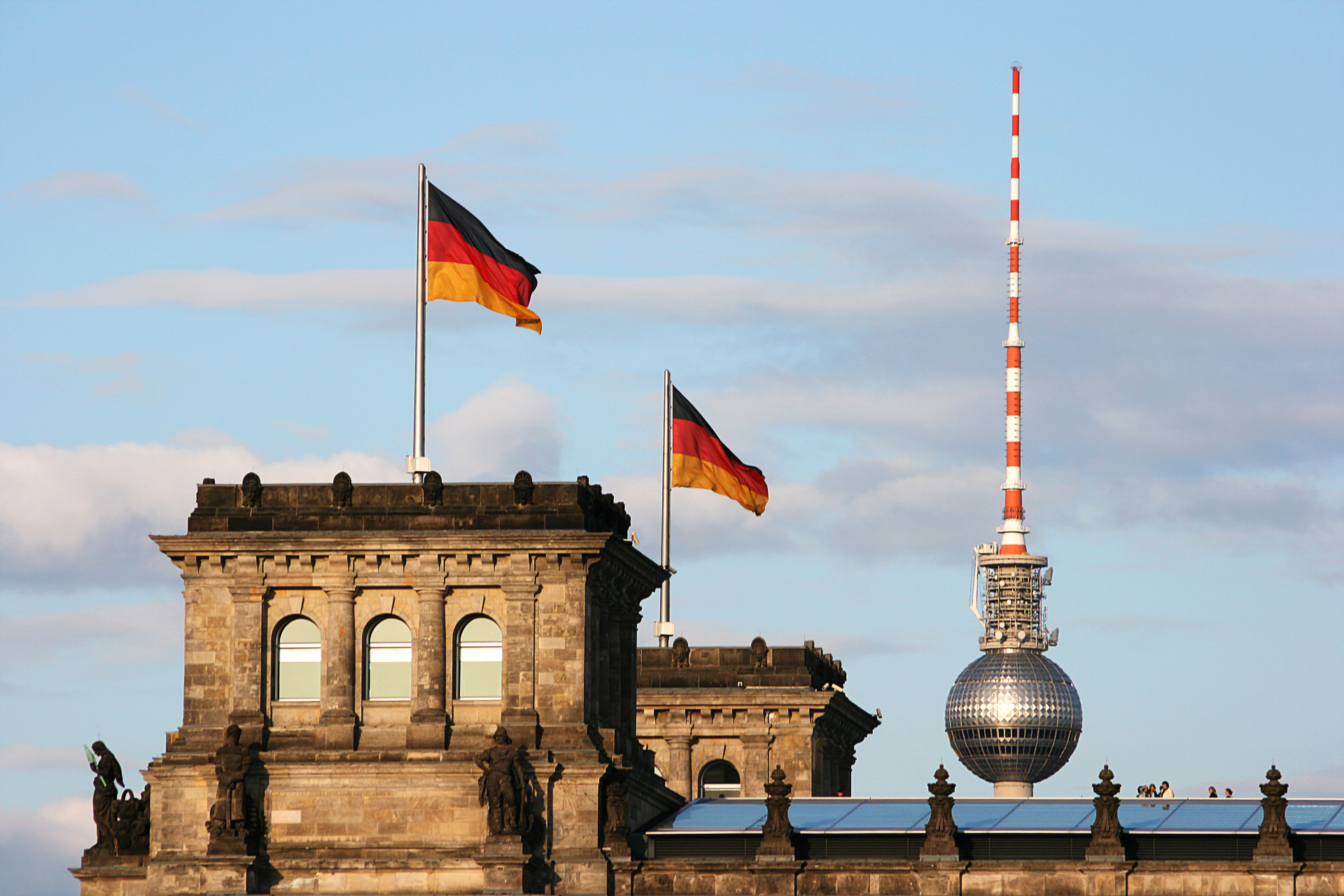
Reichstag roof and Fernsehturm

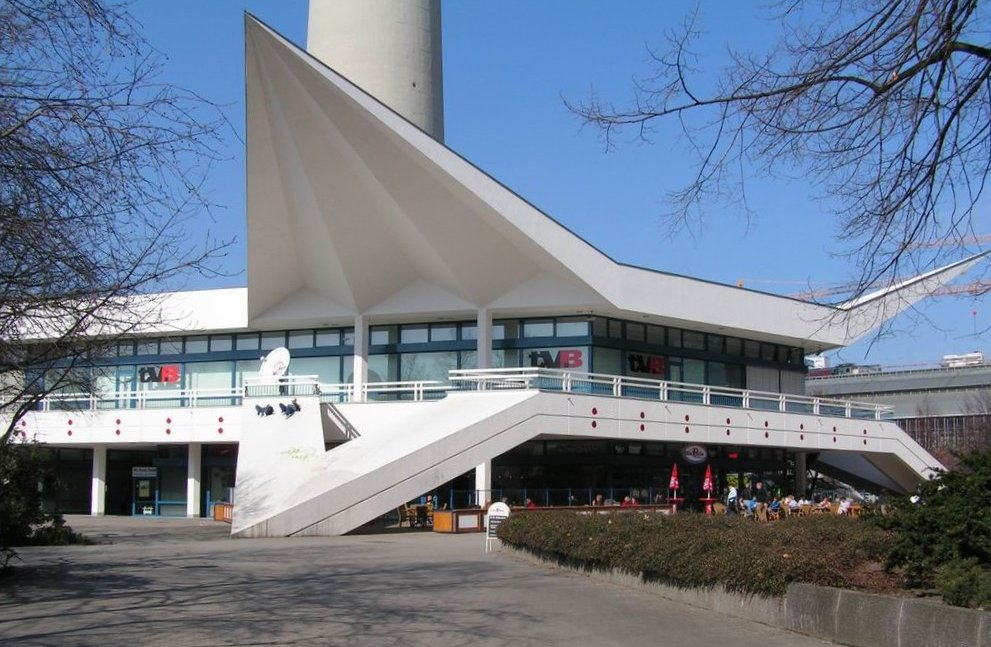
The Pavilion at Fernsehturm's base

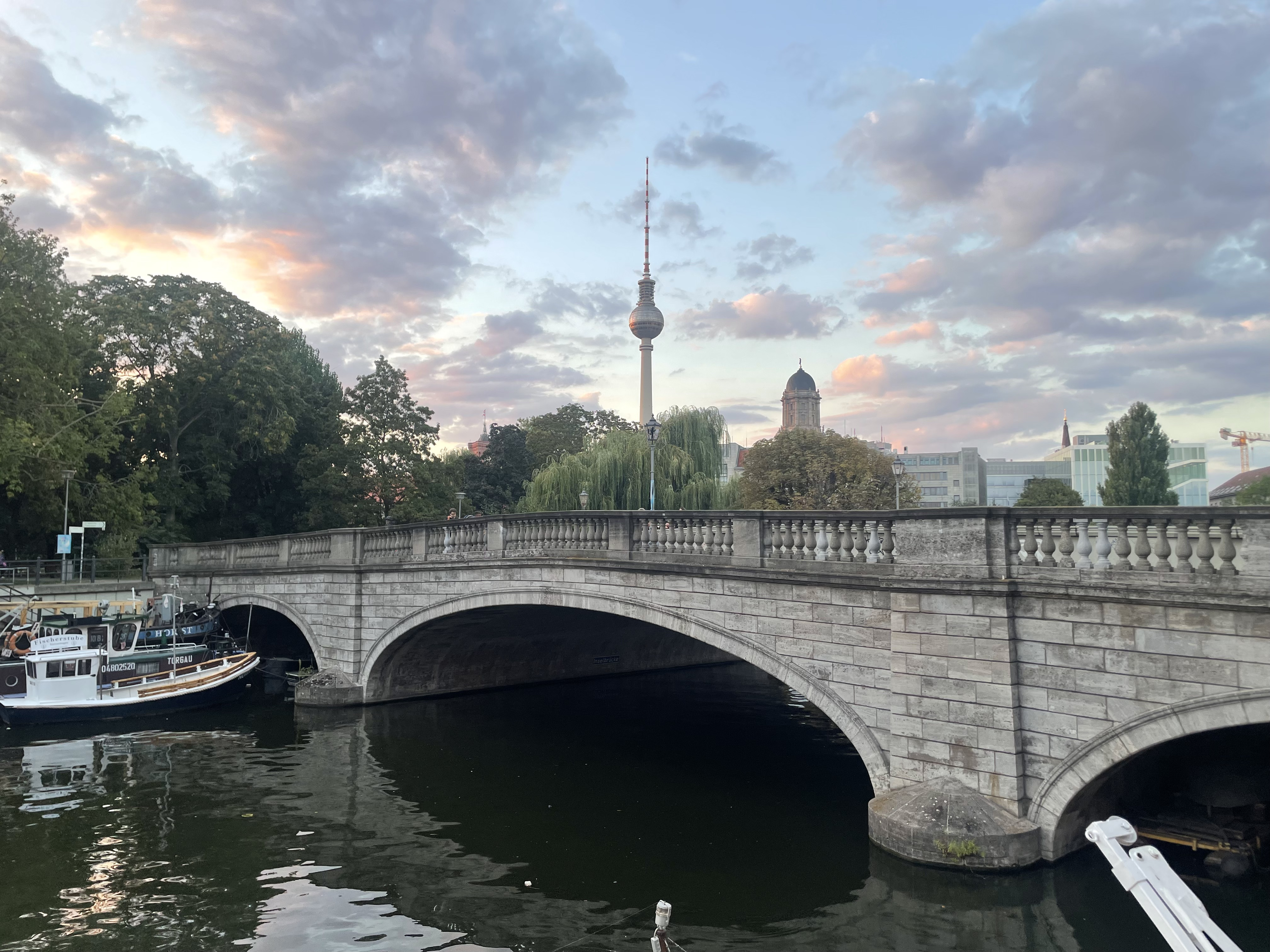
Fehrnsehturm seen from the Spree, August 2024

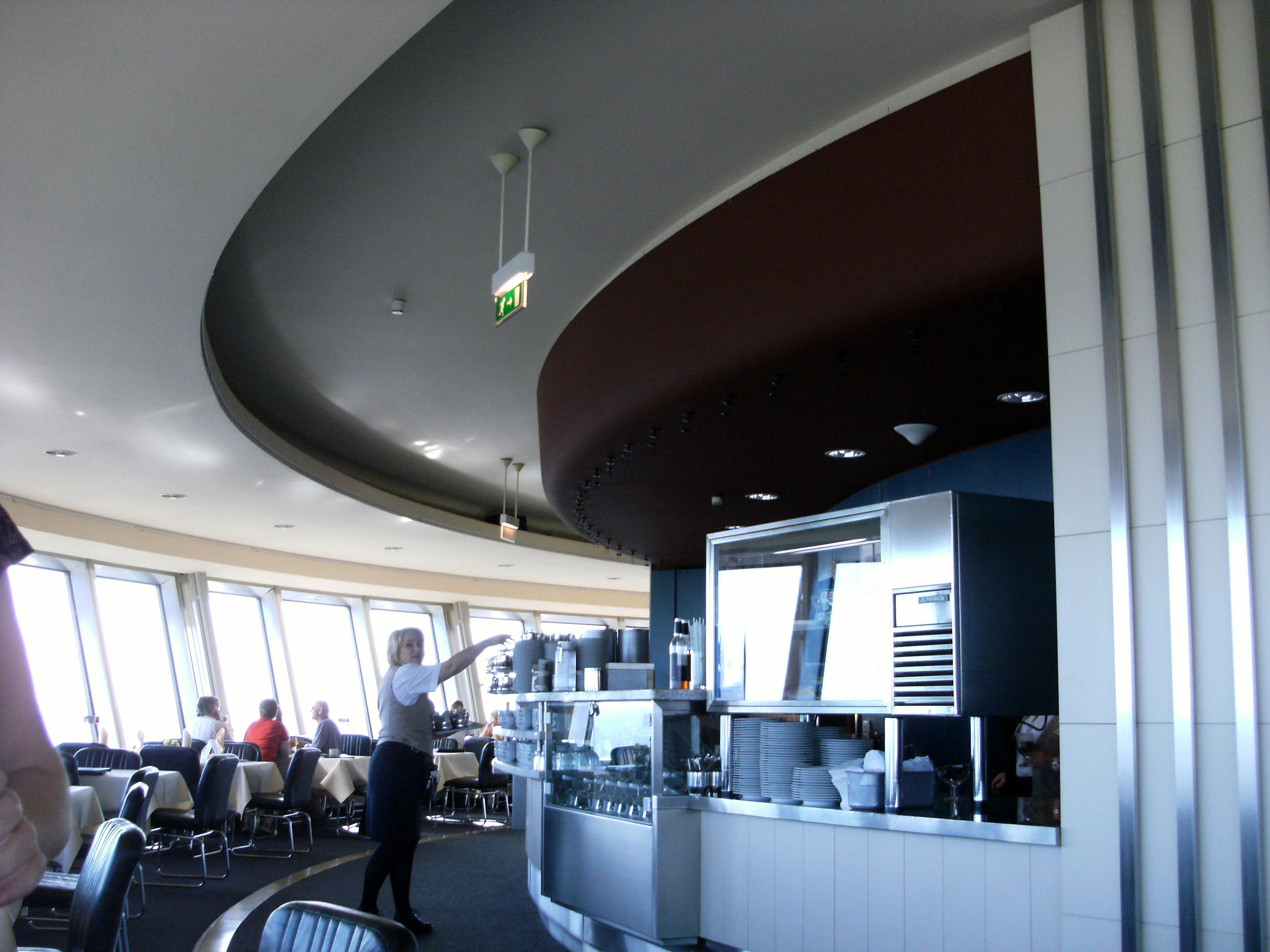
Panorama café atop Berlin TV Tower

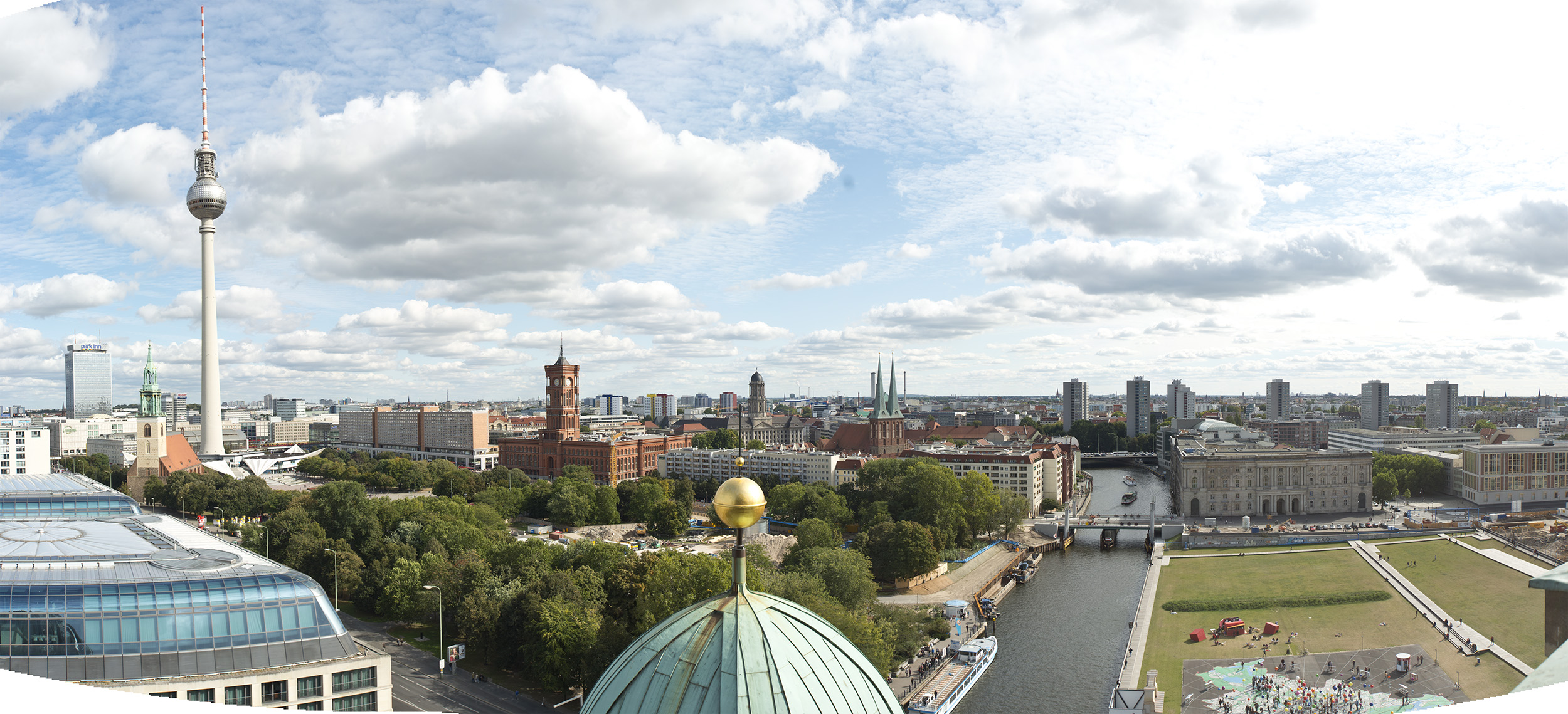
Panorama of Berlin Mitte with TV Tower

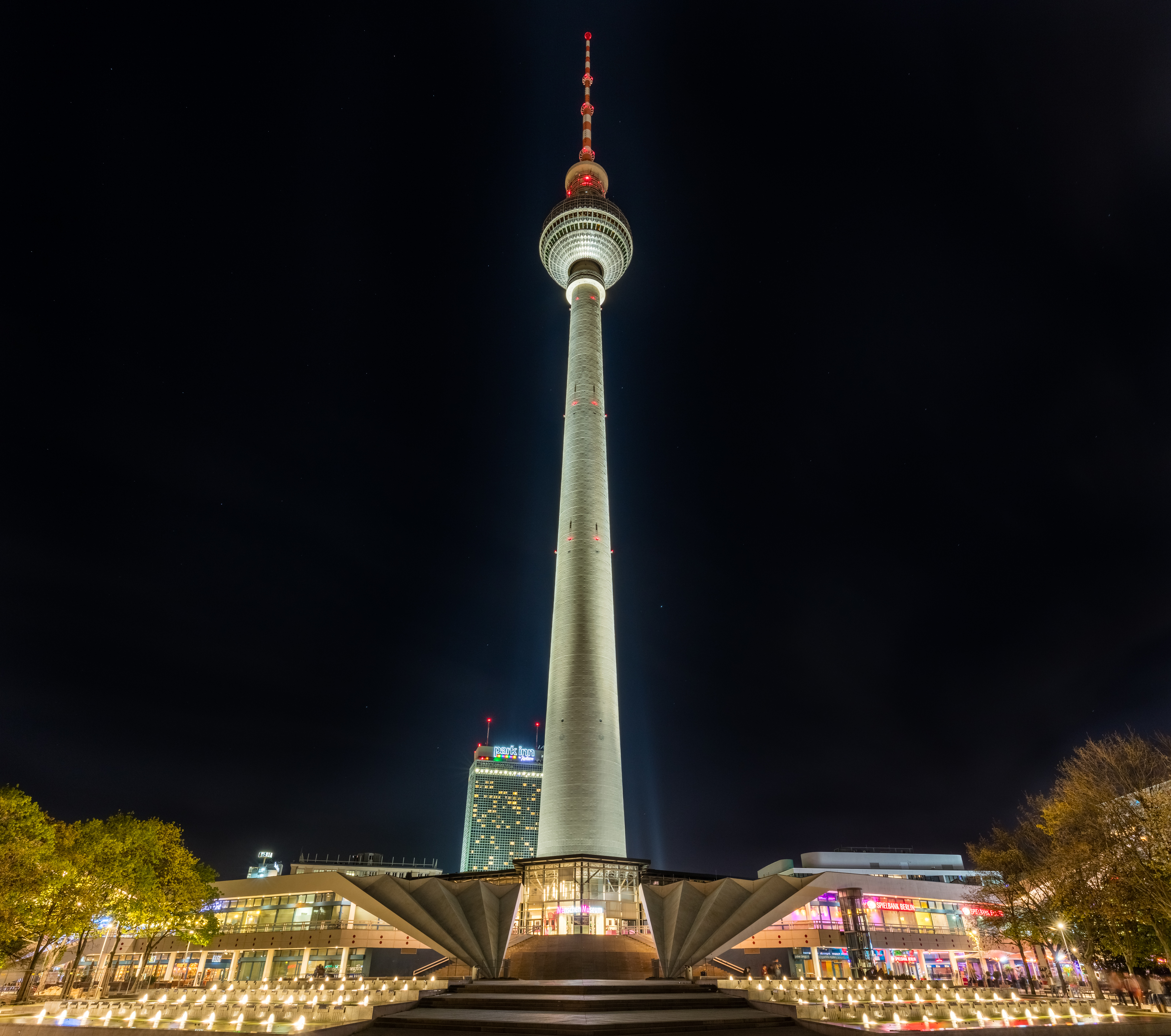
Fernsehturm Berlin Down to Up, at night

== Visitors and tourism ==
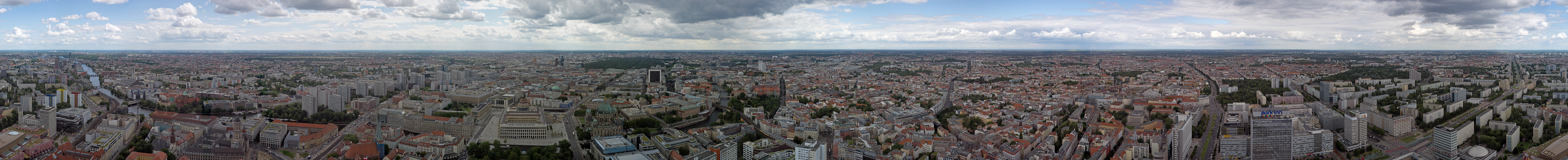
360° panorama taken from the viewing floor

The Berlin TV Tower is not only a broadcasting tower, but also a landmark, tourist attraction and venue. The TV Tower's observation deck and revolving restaurant are run by Magnicity, a group based in France that operates attractions at the top of the Montparnasse Tower in Paris and 360 CHICAGO at the former John Hancock Center in Chicago, among others. The Berlin TV Tower is the highest publicly accessible building in Europe and was the highest publicly accessible observation platform in Germany until 2017, when the TK Elevator Test Tower in Rottweil has overtaken this rank. In the first three years after its inauguration, as many as four million people visited the structure. After the German reunification, the visitor average has levelled off to approximately 1.2 million from some 90 countries a year. Of these, around 60 per cent come from abroad, with Spaniards being the biggest group, accounting for 8.1 per cent, followed by Italians (7.6 per cent) and Danes (6.7 per cent). The maximum admissible number of persons inside the ball is 320 persons. Of the up to 5,000 visitors daily, about 1,500 visit the tower restaurant. In GDR times, the duration of a stay in the Tele-Café was limited to 60 minutes and in the observation deck to 30 minutes.

The two visitor elevators carry 12 people each in about 40 seconds to the observation platform at 203 metres (666 ft), where Berlin's highest bar is also located. From 60 windows there is a panoramic view over the whole of Berlin and the surrounding areas. The restaurant, which is located 21 steps above the observation platform at 207 metres (679 ft) altitude, rotates 360 degrees in an hour. For fire protection reasons, the main kitchen is located at the foot of the tower. The meals are transported by lift to the restaurant floor, where they are prepared in a small satellite kitchen. Apart from the two evacuation platforms below the tower basket, the fire protection concept includes a strict smoking ban throughout the entire structure. Wheelchair users and persons with current walking disabilities cannot visit the Berlin TV Tower, as they would not be able to use the escape route in case of emergency. Animals, prams and large luggage are also not admitted for safety reasons.

On 14 June 2011 – almost 42 years after the inauguration – the then Governing Mayor Klaus Wowereit welcomed the 50 millionth visitor. The entire city can be viewed from the observation deck of the TV Tower. If there is good visibility, the view reaches as far as the recreational park Tropical Islands Resort, at a distance of almost 60 kilometres (37 miles).

The TV Tower, which is open all year to the public, has seasonal opening times. The last ascent to the observation platform is daily at 11.30 pm, whereas the last admission to the restaurant is at 11 pm. The public area can be rented for special events, parties, receptions and other events with a maximum of 200 guests. Civil weddings can also be celebrated on the TV Tower. In this case, the bar area on the observation deck is reserved for an hour for the bridal couple and a wedding party of up to 30 guests.

== Technical details ==
- 1 tuned mass damper
- Entrance of observation deck is 6.25 metres (20.5 ft) above ground
- 2 Kone lifts for transport of visitors
- 1 lift for transport of technical equipment and staff of technical facilities
- Steel stairway with 986 steps
- Evacuation platforms at 188 and 191 metres (617 and 627 ft) high
- Observation deck at 203.78 metres (668.6 ft)
- Restaurant at 207.53 metres (680.9 ft)
- Height of the tower: 368.03 metres (1,207.4 ft)
- Weight of the shaft: 26,000 tonnes (26,000 long tons; 29,000 short tons)
- Weight of the sphere 4,800 tonnes (4,700 long tons; 5,300 short tons)
- Diameter of the sphere 32 metres (105 ft)
- Foundation depth: between 2.7 and 5.8 metres (8.9 and 19.0 ft)
- Outer diameter of the foundation: 42 metres (138 ft)
- Diameter of the tower ball: 32 metres (105 ft)
- The transmission systems for television and radio broadcasting and the operating rooms of the technicians are located at 216 metres (709 ft), 220 and 224 metres (722 and 735 ft)
- The air-conditioning system is located on the ground floor at 200 metres (660 ft), the fire-gas control centre for fire fighting is located on the top floor
- 150 different antennas for TV and radio transmission on the antenna carrier
- 20,000 square kilometres (7,700 mi^{2}) of transmission area

=== Channels by frequency ===
==== Analogue FM radio ====
Frequency	kW	Service
87.9 MHz	1	Star FM
89.6 MHz	20	Deutschlandfunk Kultur
90.2 MHz	16	Radio Teddy
91.4 MHz	100	Berliner Rundfunk 91,4
93.6 MHz	2.4	Jam FM
94.3 MHz	25	94,3 rs2
95.8 MHz	100	Radio Eins
97.7 MHz	100	Deutschlandfunk
98.8 MHz	1	98.8 KISS FM Berlin
99.7 MHz	100	Antenne Brandenburg
100.6 MHz	12.6	FluxFM
101.3 MHz	4	Klassik Radio
101.9 MHz	0.5	Radyo Metropol FM
102.6 MHz	15	Fritz
103.4 MHz	8	Energy Berlin
104.6 MHz	10	104.6 RTL
105.5 MHz	5	105'5 Spreeradio
106.0 MHz	1	Schlager Radio
107.5 MHz	40	BB Radio

==== Digital radio (DAB)/Digital mobile television (DMB) ====
Frequency	Block	kW	Operator
178.352 MHz	5C	10	DR Deutschland
179.296 MHz	5D	10	Antenne Deutschland
190.640 MHz	7B	10	Berlin/BRBG 7B
194.064 MHz	7D	10	rbb Berlin K7D
229.072 MHz	12D	10	Berlin/BRBG K12D

==== Digital television (DVB-T) ====
- UHF 25 (506 MHz) – RTL Group
  - RTL
  - RTL II
  - Super RTL
  - VOX
- UHF 27 (522 MHz) – ARD national programming
  - Das Erste
  - rbb Fernsehen Berlin
  - Phoenix
  - tagesschau24/rbb Fernsehen (Brandenburg)
- UHF 33 (570 MHz) – ZDFvision
  - ZDF
  - 3sat
  - ZDFinfokanal
  - ZDFneo/KiKa
- UHF 39 (618 MHz) – Mixed Berlin 4
  - QVC
  - Disney Channel Germany
  - Bibel TV
  - Bayerisches Fernsehen
  - n-tv
  - RTL Shop/Euronews
  - 5 radio stations
- UHF 44 (658 MHz) – ProSiebenSat.1
  - ProSieben
  - Sat.1
  - kabel eins
  - N24
- UHF 47 (682 MHz) – ARD regional programming
  - MDR Fernsehen (Sachsen/Sachsen-Anhalt/Thüringen)
  - arte
  - NDR Fernsehen (Bremen/Hamburg/Mecklenburg-Vorpommern/Niedersachsen/Schleswig-Holstein)
  - hr-fernsehen
- UHF 50 (706 MHz) – Mixed Berlin 1
  - WDR Fernsehen (Köln)
  - SWR Fernsehen (Baden-Württemberg/Rheinland-Pfalz)
  - HSE24
  - Tele 5
- UHF 56 (754 MHz) – Mixed Berlin 2
  - iMusic1
  - sixx
  - Eurosport
  - TV.Berlin
- UHF 59 (778 MHz) – Mixed Berlin 3
  - Servus TV
  - Anixe
  - Juwelo TV

== Analogue TV stations ==
The analogue TV service was shut down on 4 August 2003.

Frequency	Channel	kW	Service
175.25 MHz	5	100	TV.Berlin (originally DFF1)
519.25 MHz	27	1000	RBB Brandenburg (originally DFF2)
631.25 MHz	41	1	BBC World
655.25 MHz	44	700	ProSieben
711.25 MHz	51	5	n-tv

== See also ==
- List of towers
- List of tallest freestanding structures
- List of tallest structures in Germany
- Fernsehturm Stuttgart
- Funkturm Berlin
- Fernmeldeturm Berlin
