= Alexanderplatz =

Square in Berlin, Germany

- Panoramic view of Alexanderplatz in 2015
- Interactive map of Alexanderplatz
- Former names: Paradeplatz; (18th century); Königsplatz; (c. 1740–1805)
- Part of: Bundesstraße 1; Bundesstraße 2; Bundesstraße 5
- Namesake: Alexander I of Russia
- Type: Public square
- Area: 34,000 m^{2} (370,000 sq ft)
- Location: Berlin, Germany
- Quarter: Mitte
- Nearest metro station: Alexanderplatz
- Coordinates: 52°31′18″N 13°24′49″E
- Major junctions: Alexanderstraße; Karl-Marx-Allee; Otto-Braun-Straße; Bernhard-Weiß-Straße; Karl-Liebknecht-Straße; Memhardstraße; Dircksenstraße; Rathausstraße; Grunerstraße

Alexanderplatz at night in 2015

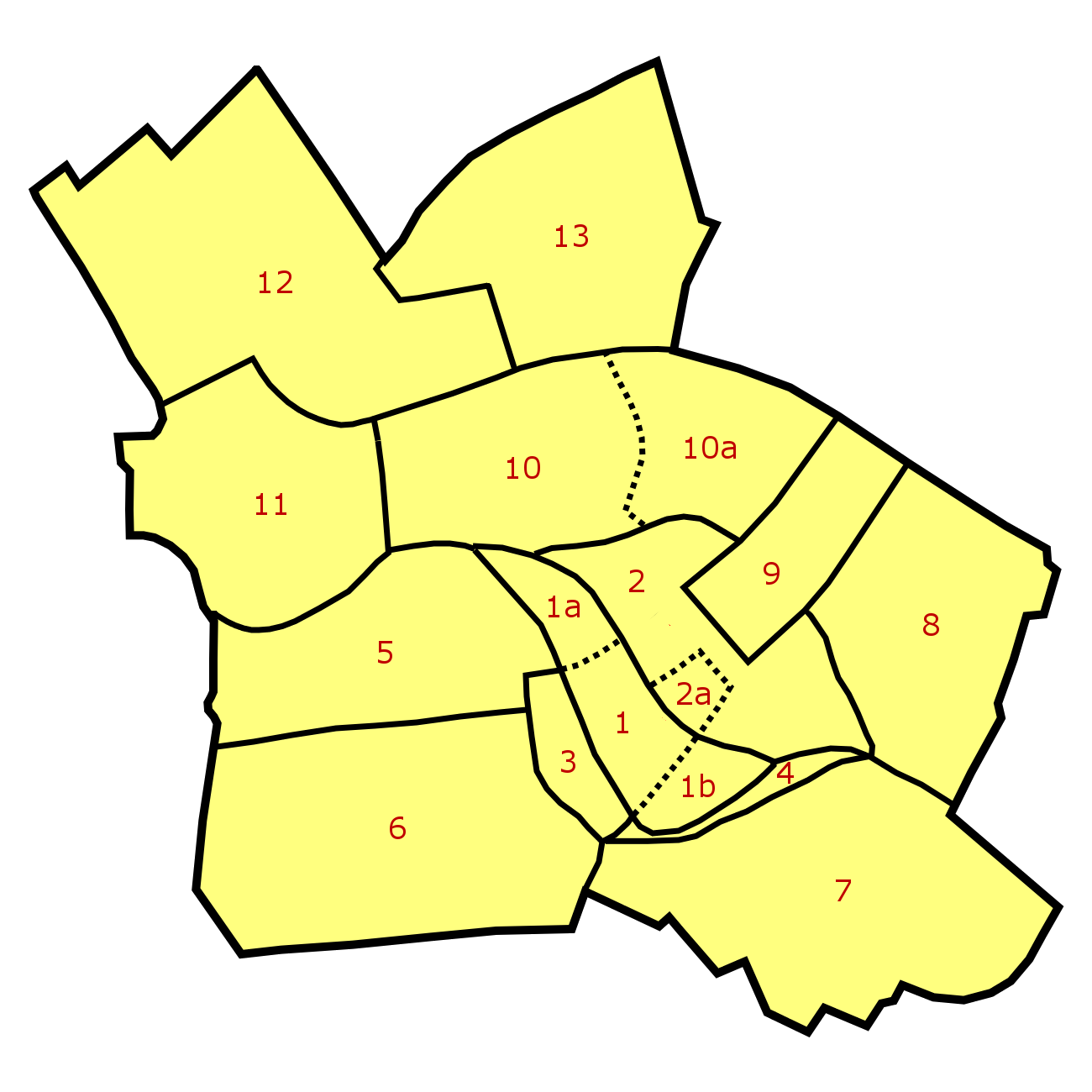
Quarters of Berlin-Mitte: Cölln (1); Museum Island (1a); Fisher Island (1b); Alt-Berlin (2); Nikolaiviertel (2a); Friedrichswerder (3); Neukölln am Wasser (4); Dorotheenstadt (5); Friedrichstadt (6); Luisenstadt (7); Stralauer Vorstadt (8); Alexanderplatz (9); Spandauer Vorstadt (10); Scheunenviertel (10a); Friedrich-Wilhelm-Stadt (11); Oranienburger Vorstadt (12); Rosenthaler Vorstadt (13)

Alexanderplatz (German: [alɛkˈsandɐˌplats], Alexander Square) is a large public square and transport hub in the central Mitte district of Berlin. The square is named after the Russian Tsar Alexander I, which also denotes the larger neighbourhood stretching from Mollstraße in the north-east to Spandauer Straße and the Rotes Rathaus in the south-west.

Alexanderplatz is reputedly the most visited area of Berlin, beating Friedrichstrasse and City West. It is a popular starting point for tourists, with many attractions including the Fernsehturm (TV tower), the Nikolai Quarter and the Rotes Rathaus ('Red City Hall') situated nearby. Alexanderplatz is still one of Berlin's major commercial areas, housing various shopping malls, department stores and other large retail locations.

== History ==
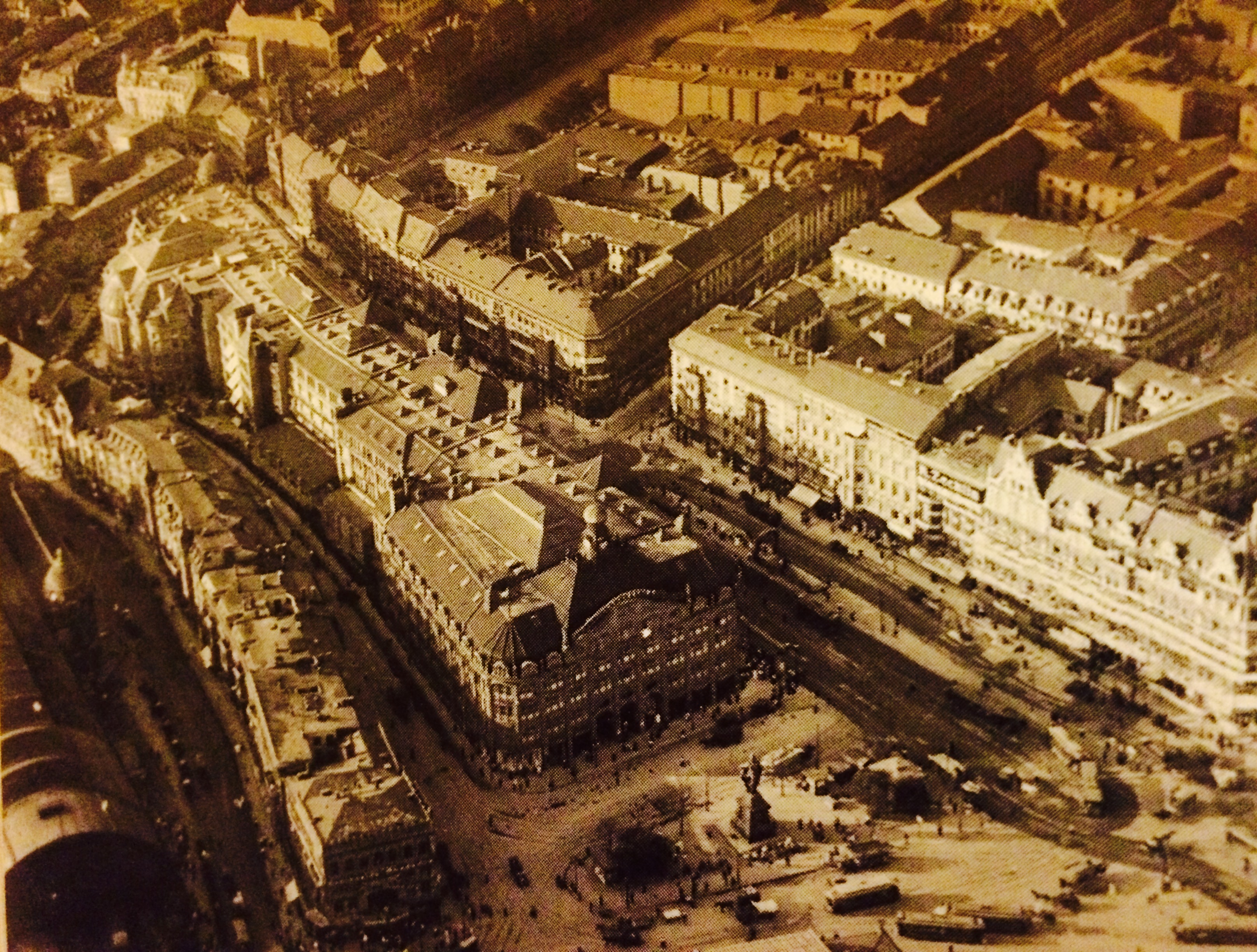
Alexanderplatz in 1912

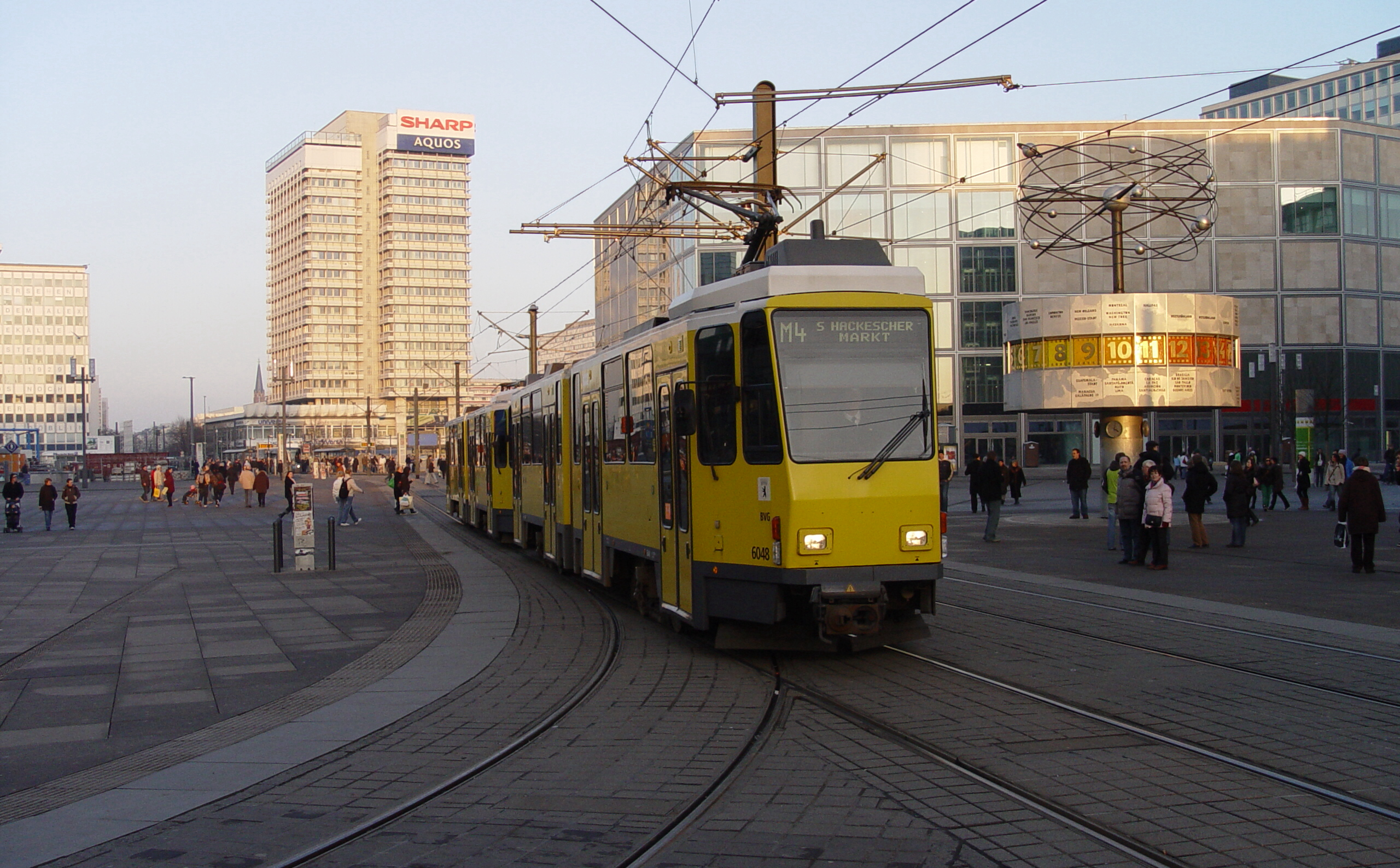
Tram passing the World Clock

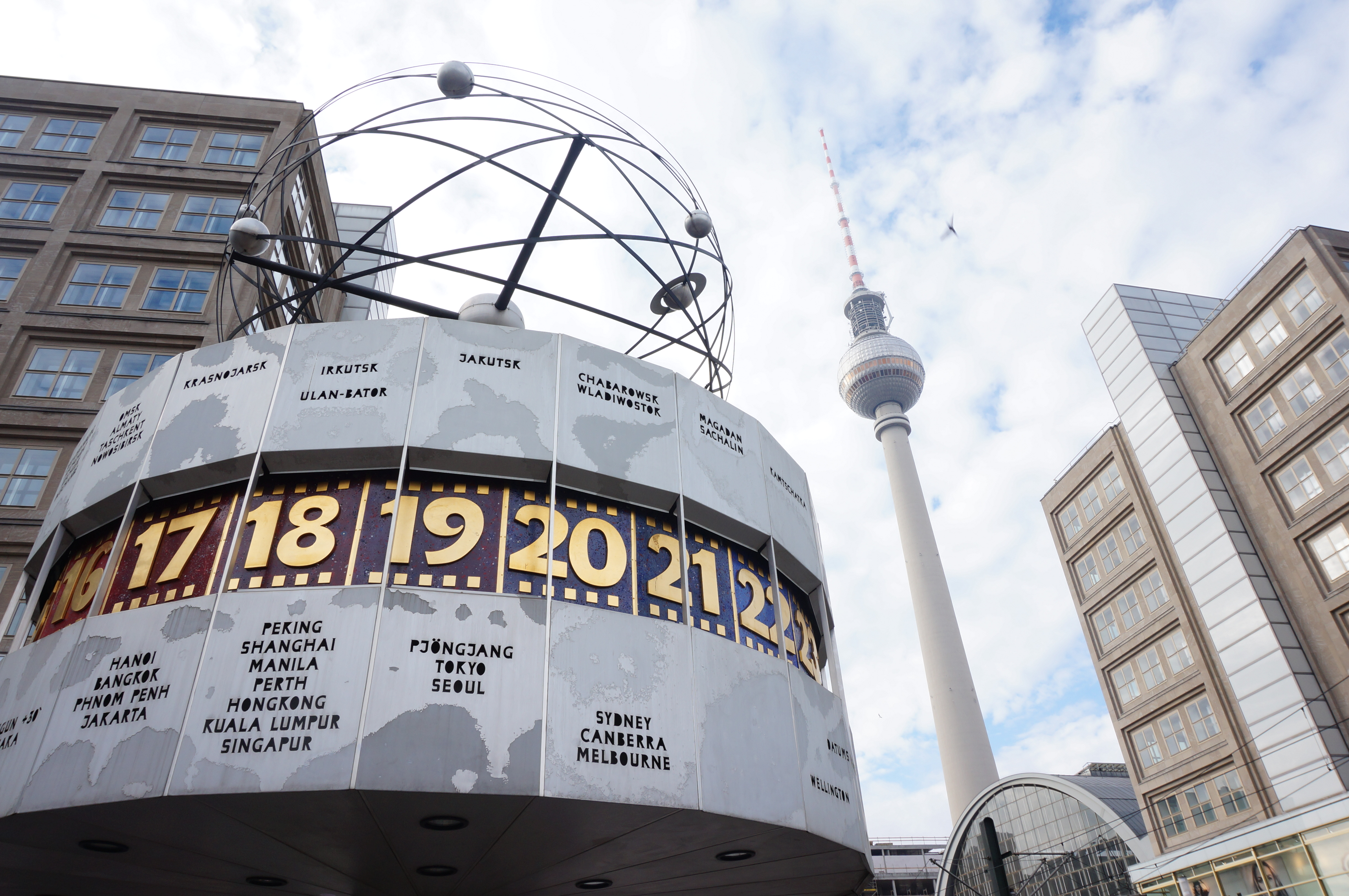
Alexanderplatz in 2013

=== Early history to the 18th century ===
A hospital stood at the location of present-day Alexanderplatz in the 13th century. Named Heiliger Georg (St. George), the hospital gave its name to the nearby Georgentor (George Gate) of the Berlin city wall. Outside the city walls, this area was largely undeveloped until around 1400, when the first settlers began building thatched cottages. As a gallows was located close by, the area earned the nickname the Teufels Lustgarten ('Devil's Pleasure Garden').

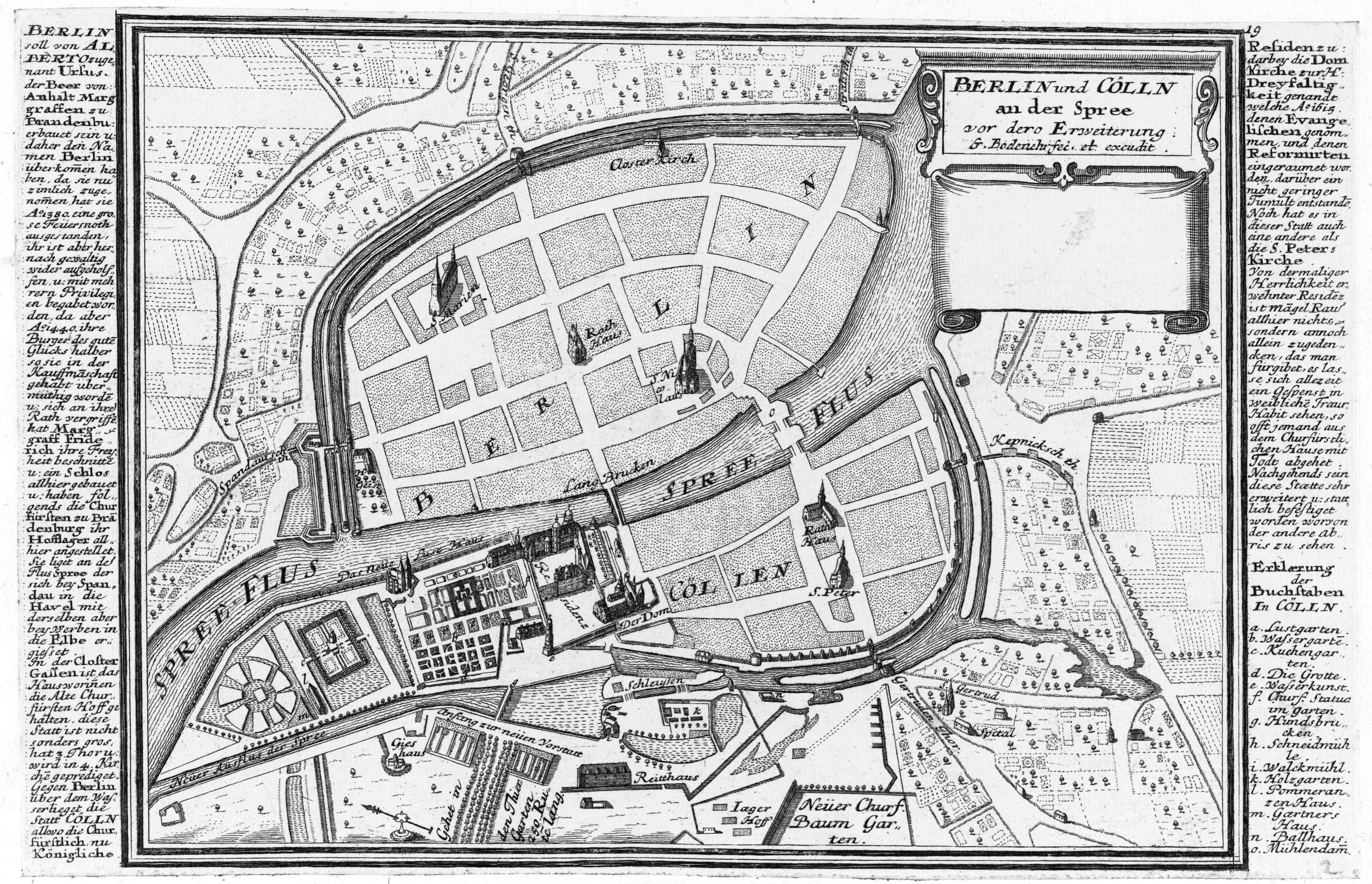
Memhardt Plan from 1652 with Georgentor

The George Gate became the most important of Berlin's city gates during the 16th century, being the main entry point for goods arriving along the roads to the north and north-east of the city, for example from Oderberg, Prenzlau and Bernau, and the big Hanseatic cities on the Baltic Sea.

After the Thirty Years' War, the city wall was strengthened. From 1658 to 1683, a citywide fortress was constructed to plans by the Linz master builder, Johann Gregor Memhardt. The new fortress contained 13 bastions connected by ramparts and was preceded by a moat measuring up to 50 metres (160 ft) wide. Within the new fortress, many of the historic city wall gates were closed. For example, the southeastern Stralauer Gate was closed but the Georgian Gate remained open, making the Georgian Gate an even more important entrance to the city.

In 1681, the trade of cattle and pig fattening was banned within the city. Frederick William, the Great Elector, granted cheaper plots of land, waiving the basic interest rate, in the area in front of the Georgian Gate. Settlements grew rapidly and a weekly cattle market was established on the square in front of the Gate.

The area developed into a suburb – the Georgenvorstadt – which continued to flourish into the late 17th century. Unlike the southwestern suburbs (Friedrichstadt, Dorotheenstadt) which were strictly and geometrically planned, the suburbs in the northeast (Georgenvorstadt, Spandauervorstadt and the Stralauer Vorstadt) proliferated without plan. Despite a building ban imposed in 1691, more than 600 houses existed in the area by 1700.

At that time, the George Gate was a rectangular gatehouse with a tower. Next to the tower stood a remaining tower from the original medieval city walls. The upper floors of the gatehouse served as the city jail. A drawbridge spanned the moat and the gate was locked at nightfall by the garrison using heavy oak planks.

A highway ran through the cattle market to the northeast towards Bernau. To the right stood the George chapel, an orphanage and a hospital that was donated by the Elector Sophie Dorothea in 1672. Next to the chapel stood a dilapidated medieval plague house which was demolished in 1716. Behind it was a rifleman's field and an inn, later named the Stelzenkrug.

By the end of the 17th century, 600 to 700 families lived in this area. They included butchers, cattle herders, shepherds and dairy farmers. The George chapel was upgraded to the George church and received its own preacher.

=== Königs Thor Platz (1701–1805) ===
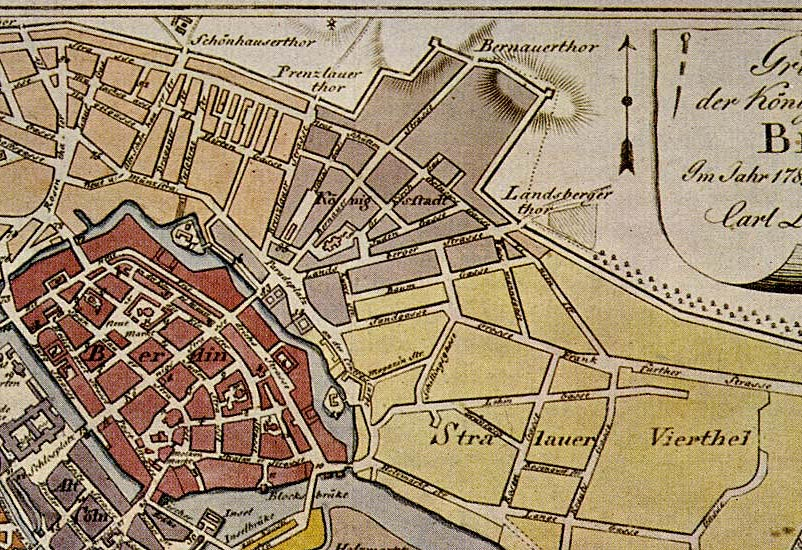
City map showing the Königsvorstadt (1789). The Alt Berlin is shown in red, the royal suburbs northeast brown.

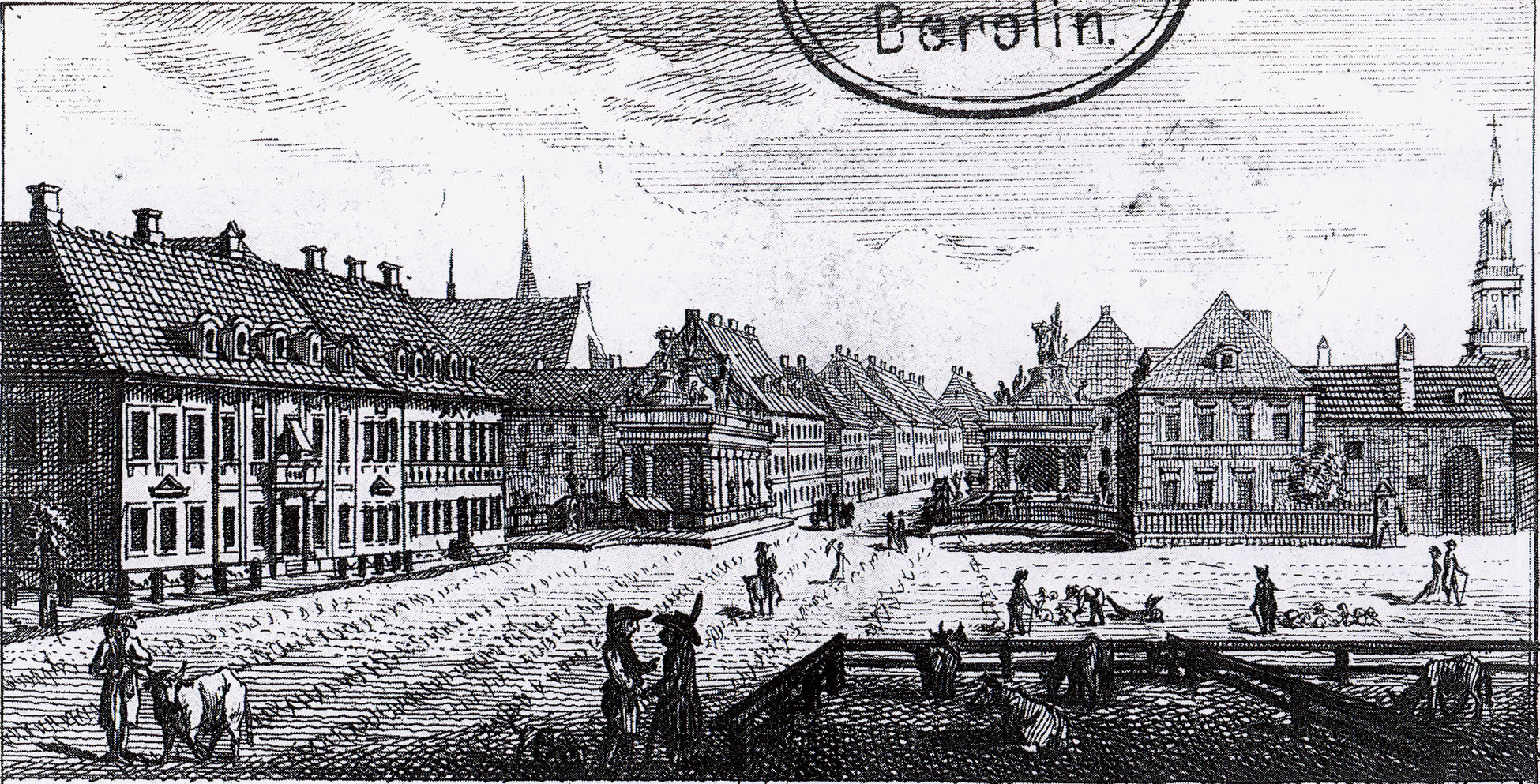
Alexanderplatz, 1796 (in the middle the Königsbrücke (King's Bridge) with its colonnades)

After his coronation in Königsberg on 6 May 1701 the Prussian King Frederick I entered Berlin through the George Gate. This led to the gate being renamed the King's Gate, and the surrounding area became known in official documents as Königs Thor Platz (King's Gate Square). The Georgenvorstadt suburb was renamed Königsvorstadt (or 'royal suburbs' short).

In 1734, the Berlin Customs Wall, which initially consisted of a ring of palisade fences, was reinforced and grew to encompass the old city and its suburbs, including Königsvorstadt. This resulted in the King's Gate losing importance as an entry point for goods into the city. The gate was finally demolished in 1746.

By the end of the 18th century, the basic structure of the royal suburbs of the Königsvorstadt had been developed. It consisted of irregular-shaped blocks of buildings running along the historic highways which once carried goods in various directions out of the gate. At this time, the area contained large factories (silk and wool), such as the Kurprinz (one of Berlin's first cloth factories, located in a former barn) and a workhouse established in 1758 for beggars and homeless people, where the inmates worked a man-powered treadmill to turn a mill.

Soon, military facilities came to dominate the area, such as the 1799–1800 military parade grounds designed by David Gilly. At this time, the residents of the Platz were mostly craftsmen, petty-bourgeois, retired soldiers and manufacturing workers. The southern part of the later Alexanderplatz was separated from traffic by trees and served as a parade ground, whereas the northern half remained a market. Beginning in the mid-18th century, the most important wool market in Germany was held in Alexanderplatz.

Between 1752 and 1755, the writer Gotthold Ephraim Lessing lived in a house on Alexanderplatz. In 1771, a new stone bridge (the Königsbrücke) was built over the moat and in 1777 a colonnade-lined row of shops (Königskolonnaden) was constructed by architect Carl von Gontard. Between 1783 and 1784, seven three-storey buildings were erected around the square by Georg Christian Unger, including the famous Gasthof zum Hirschen, where Karl Friedrich Schinkel lived as a permanent tenant and Heinrich von Kleist stayed in the days before his suicide.

=== Alexanderplatz (1805–1900) ===
On 25 October 1805 the Russian Tsar Alexander I was welcomed to the city on the parade grounds in front of the old King's Gate. To mark this occasion, on 2 November, King Frederick William III ordered the square to be renamed Alexanderplatz:

His Royal Majesty, by means of the supreme Cabinet, orders on the 2nd of this month, those in the Königs-Vorstadt Sandgasse to take the name Kaiserstrasse, and the square in front of the workhouse in the newly-conceived suburb settles with the name of Alexander-Platz, this is hereby made known to the public for news and attention.

— Royal Prussian Police Directorate

In the southeast of the square, the cloth factory buildings were converted into the Königstädter Theater by Carl Theodor Ottmer at a cost of 120,000 Taler. The foundation stone was laid on 31 August 1823 and the opening ceremony occurred on 4 August 1824. Sales were poor, forcing the theatre to close on 3 June 1851. Thereafter, the building was used for wool storage, then as a tenement building, and finally as an inn called Aschinger until the building's demolition in 1932.

During these years, the Alexanderplatz was populated by fish wives, water carriers, sand sellers, rag-and-bone men, knife sharpeners and day laborers. Because of its importance as a transport hub, horse-drawn buses ran every 15 minutes between Alexanderplatz and Potsdamer Platz in 1847. During the March Revolution of 1848, large-scale street fighting occurred on the streets of Alexanderplatz and revolutionaries used barricades to block the route from Alexanderplatz to the city. The novelist and poet Theodor Fontane, who worked in the vicinity in a nearby pharmacy, participated in the construction of barricades and later described how he used materials from the Königstädter Theater to barricade Neue Königstraße.

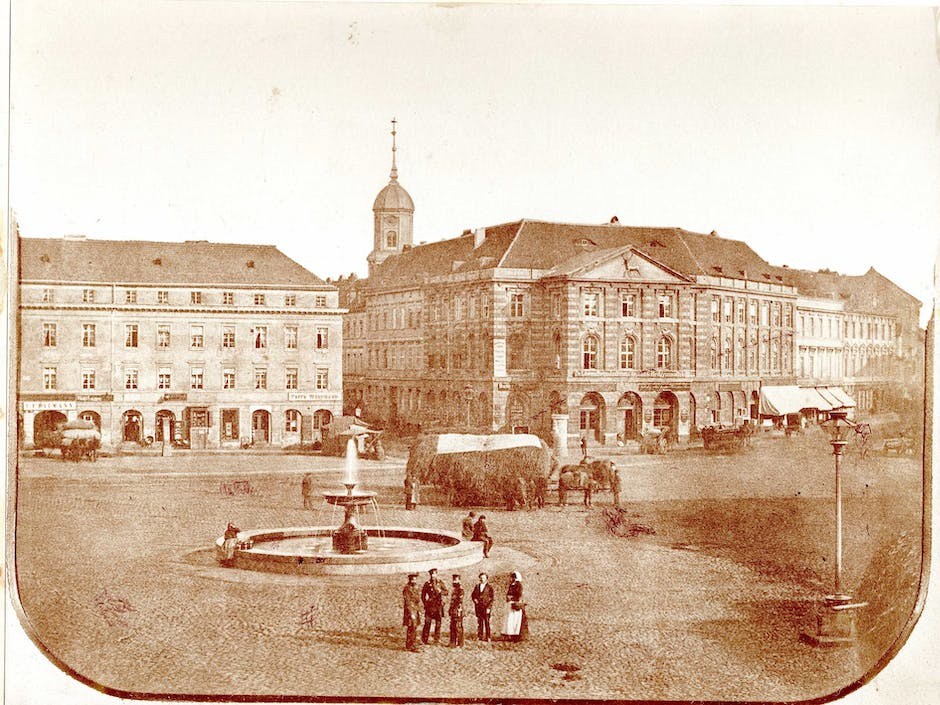
First ever picture of the Alexanderplatz, 1860

The Königsstadt district continued to grow throughout the 19th century, with three-storey developments already existing at the beginning of the century and fourth storeys being constructed from the middle of the century. By the end of the century, most of the buildings were already five storeys high. The large factories and military facilities gave way to housing developments, mainly rental housing for the factory workers who had just moved into the city, and trading houses. At the beginning of the 1870s, the Berlin administration had the former moat filled to build the Berlin city railway, which was opened in 1882 along with the train station Bahnhof Alexanderplatz.

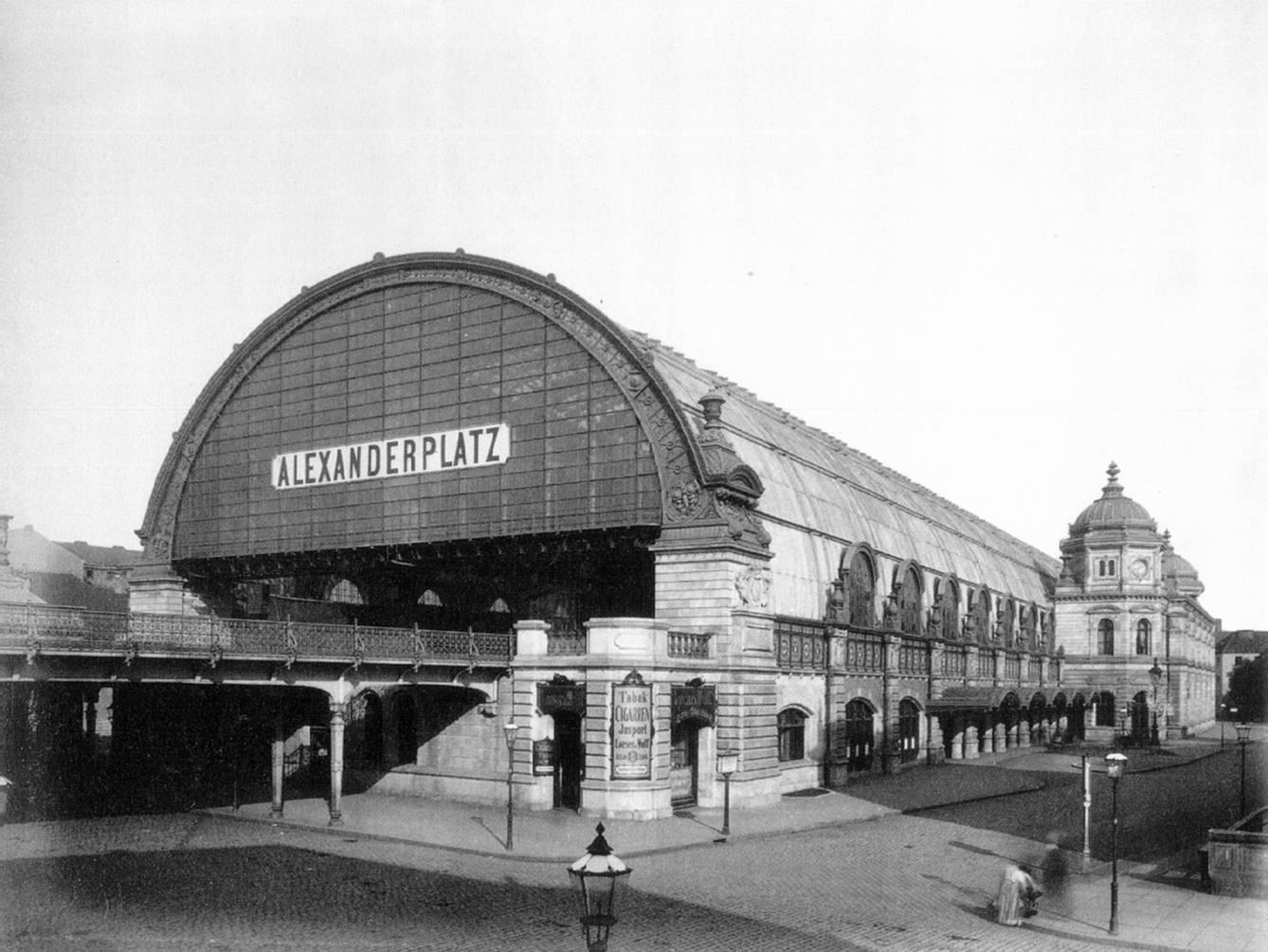
Alexanderplatz station, 1885

From 1883 to 1884, the Grand Hotel, a neo-Renaissance building with 185 rooms and shops beneath was constructed. From 1886 to 1890, Hermann Blankenstein built the police headquarters, a huge brick building whose tower on the northern corner dominated the building. In 1890, a district court at Alexanderplatz was also established. In 1886, the local authorities built a central market hall west of the rail tracks, which replaced the weekly market on the Alexanderplatz in 1896. During the end of the 19th century, the emerging private traffic and the first horse-drawn omnibus service dominated the northern part of the square, the southern part (the former parade ground) remained quiet, having green space elements added by garden director Hermann Mächtig in 1889. The northwest of the square contained a second, smaller green space where, in 1895, the 7.5-metre (25 ft) copper Berolina statue by sculptor Emil Hundrieser was erected.

=== Between Empire and the Nazi era (1900–1940) ===
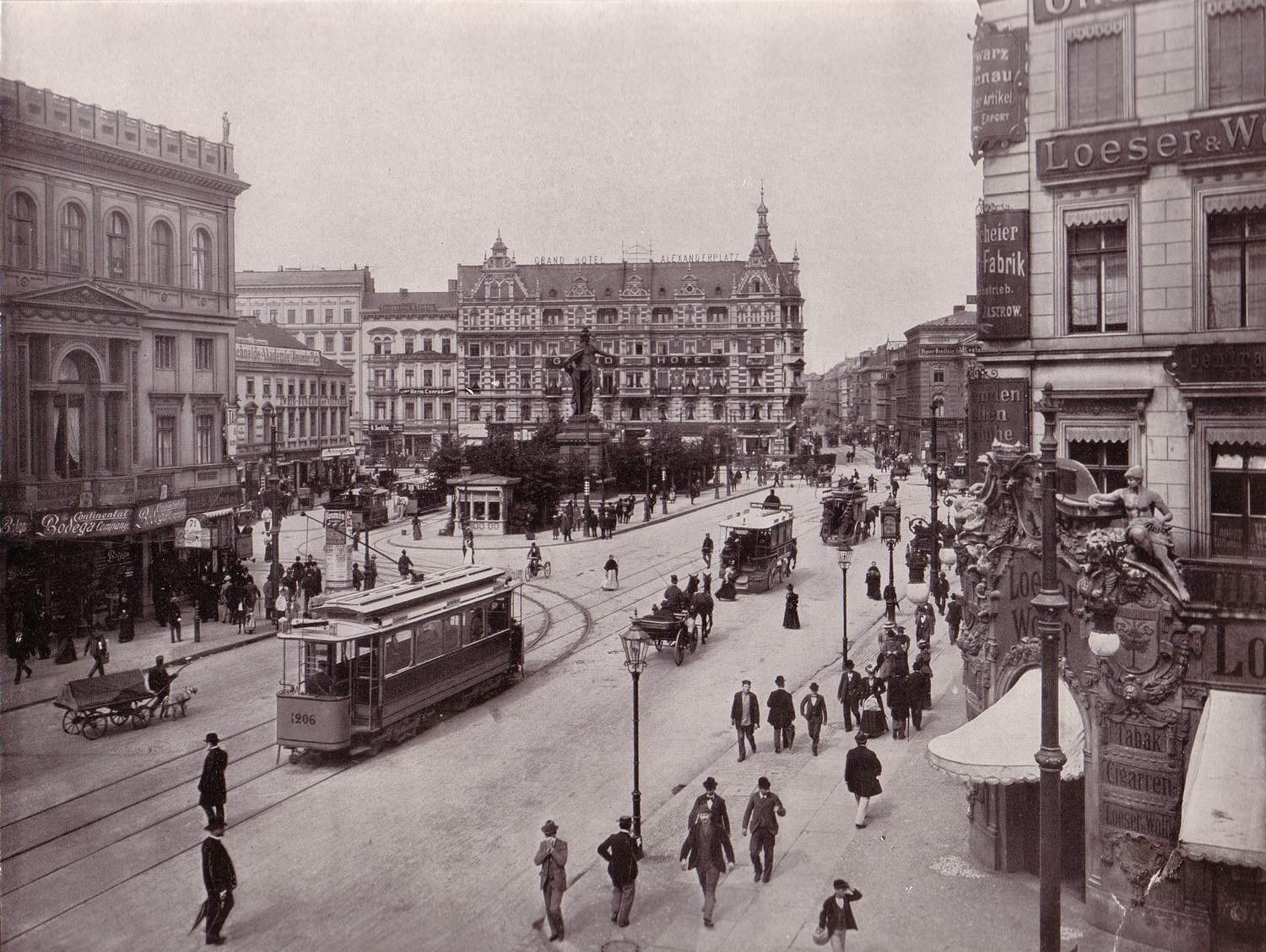
Alexanderplatz, 1903

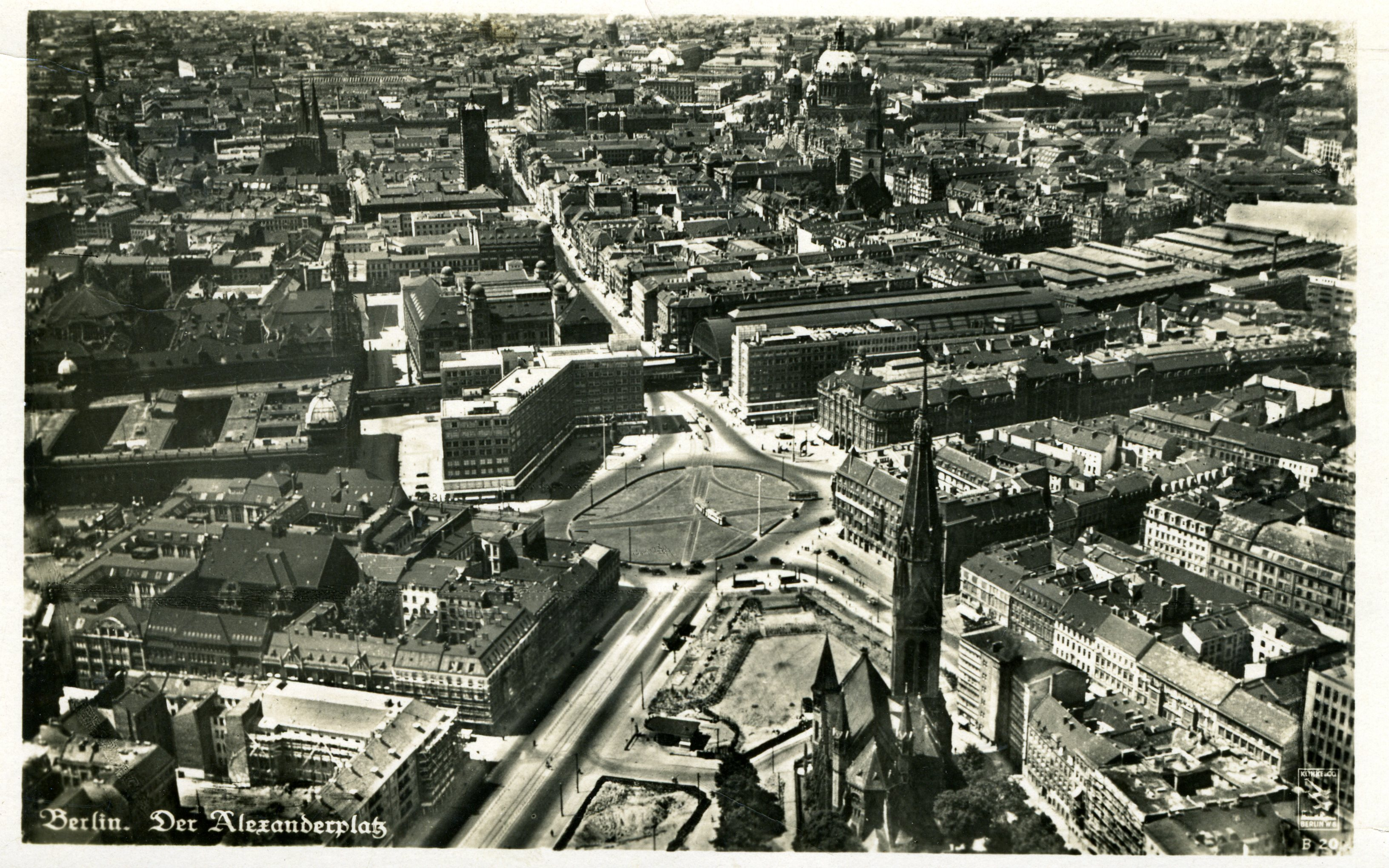
Aerial view of Alexanderplatz with Georgenkirche, in the background you can see the Marienviertel, the Heilige-Geist-Viertel, the Berlin Palace and the Berlin Cathedral, c. 1930

At the beginning of the 20th century, Alexanderplatz experienced its heyday. In 1901, Ernst von Wolzogen founded the first German cabaret, the Überbrettl, in the former Sezessionsbühne ('Secession stage') at Alexanderstraße 40, initially under the name Bunte Brettl. It was announced as "Kabarett as upscale entertainment with artistic ambitions. Emperor-loyal and market-oriented stands the uncritical amusement in the foreground."

The merchants Hermann Tietz, Georg Wertheim and Hahn opened large department stores on Alexanderplatz: Tietz (1904–1911), Wertheim (1910–1911) and Hahn (1911). Tietz marketed itself as a department store for the Berlin people, whereas Wertheim modelled itself as a department store for the world.

In October 1905, the first section of the Tietz department store opened to the public. It was designed by architects Wilhelm Albert Cremer and Richard Wolffenstein, who had already won second prize in the competition for the construction of the Reichstag building. The Tietz department store underwent further construction phases and, in 1911, had a commercial space of 7,300 square metres (79,000 sq ft) and the longest department store façade in the world at 250 metres (820 ft) in length.

For the construction of the Wertheim department store, by architects Heinrich Joseph Kayser and Karl von Großheim, the Königskolonnaden were removed in 1910 and now stand in the Heinrich von Kleist Park in Schöneberg.

In October 1908, the Haus des Lehrers ('the teacher's house') was opened next to the Bunte Brettl at Alexanderstraße 41. It was designed by Hans Toebelmann and Henry Gross. The building belonged to the Berliner Lehrererverein ('teachers’ association'), who rented space on the ground floor of the building out to a pastry shop and restaurant to raise funds for the association. The building housed the teachers' library which survived two world wars, and today is integrated into the library for educational historical research. The rear of the property contained the association's administrative building, a hotel for members and an exhibition hall. Notable events that took place in the hall include the funeral services for Karl Liebknecht and Rosa Luxemburg on 2 February 1919 and, on 4 December 1920, the Vereinigungsparteitag (Unification Party Congress) of the Communist Party and the USPD.

The First Ordinary Congress of the Communist Workers' Party of Germany was held in the nearby Zum Prälaten restaurant, 1–4 August 1920.

Alexanderplatz's position as a main transport and traffic hub continued to fuel its development. In addition to the three U-Bahn underground lines, long-distance trains and S-Bahn trains ran along the Platz's viaduct arches. Omnibuses, horse-drawn from 1877 and, after 1898, also electric-powered trams, ran out of Alexanderplatz in all directions in a star shape. The subway station was designed by Alfred Grenander and followed the colour-coded order of subway stations, which began with green at Leipziger Platz and ran through to dark red.

In the Golden Twenties, Alexanderplatz was the epitome of the lively, pulsating cosmopolitan city of Berlin, rivalled in the city only by Potsdamer Platz. Many of the buildings and rail bridges surrounding the platz bore large billboards that illuminated the night. The Berlin cigarette company Manoli had a famous billboard at the time which contained a ring of neon tubes that constantly circled a black ball. The proverbial "Berliner Tempo" of those years was characterized as "total manoli". Writer Kurt Tucholsky wrote a poem referencing the advert, and the composer Rudolf Nelson made the legendary Revue Total manoli with the dancer Lucie Berber. The writer Alfred Döblin named his novel, Berlin Alexanderplatz, after the square, and Walter Ruttmann filmed parts of his 1927 film Berlin: Die Sinfonie der Großstadt (Berlin: The Symphony of the Big City) at Alexanderplatz.

=== Destruction of Alexanderplatz (1940–1945) ===
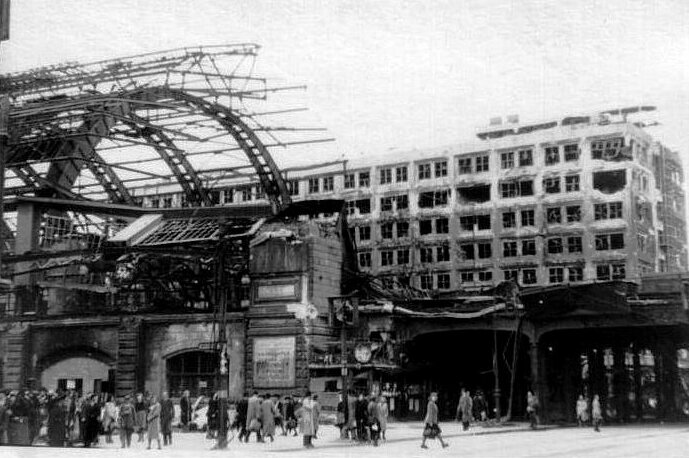
The destroyed Alexanderplatz station, May 1945

One of Berlin's largest air-raid shelters during the Second World War was situated under Alexanderplatz. It was built between 1941 and 1943 for the Deutsche Reichsbahn by Philipp Holzmann.

The war reached Alexanderplatz in early April 1945. The Berolina statue had already been removed in 1944 and probably melted down for use in arms production. During the Battle of Berlin, Red Army artillery bombarded the area around Alexanderplatz. The battles of the last days of the war destroyed considerable parts of the historic Königsstadt, as well as many of the buildings around Alexanderplatz.

The Wehrmacht had entrenched itself within the tunnels of the underground system. Hours before fighting ended in Berlin on 2 May 1945, troops of the SS detonated explosives inside the north–south S-Bahn tunnel under the Landwehr Canal to slow the advance of the Red Army towards Berlin's city centre. The entire tunnel flooded, as well as large sections of the U-Bahn network via connecting passages at the Friedrichstraße underground station. Many of those seeking shelter in the tunnels were killed. Of the then 63.3 km (39.3 miles) of subway tunnel, around 19.8 km (12.3 mi) were flooded with more than one million cubic meters (260,000,000 US gal) of water.

=== Demolition and reconstruction (1945–1964) ===
Before a planned reconstruction of the entire Alexanderplatz could take place, all the war ruins needed to be demolished and cleared away. A popular black market emerged within the ruined area, which the police raided several times a day.

One structure demolished after World War II was the 'Rote Burg', a red brick building with round arches, previously used as police and Gestapo headquarters. The huge construction project began in 1886 and was completed in 1890; it was one of Berlin's largest buildings. The 'castle' suffered extensive damage during 1944-45 and was demolished in 1957. The site on the southwest corner of Alexanderplatz remained largely unused as a carpark until the Alexa shopping centre opened in 2007.

Reconstruction planning for post-war Berlin gave priority to the dedicated space to accommodate the rapidly growing motor traffic in inner-city thoroughfares. This idea of a traffic-oriented city was already based on considerations and plans by Ludwig Hilberseimer and Le Corbusier from the 1930s.

=== East Germany ===
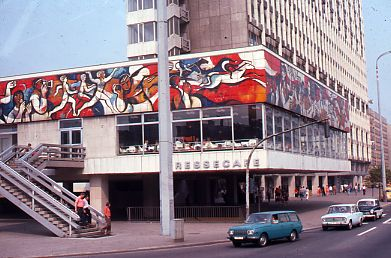
The Pressecafé in 1977. The mural displaying the Marxist view of the press had been covered over by commercial advertising, but has since been re-revealed.

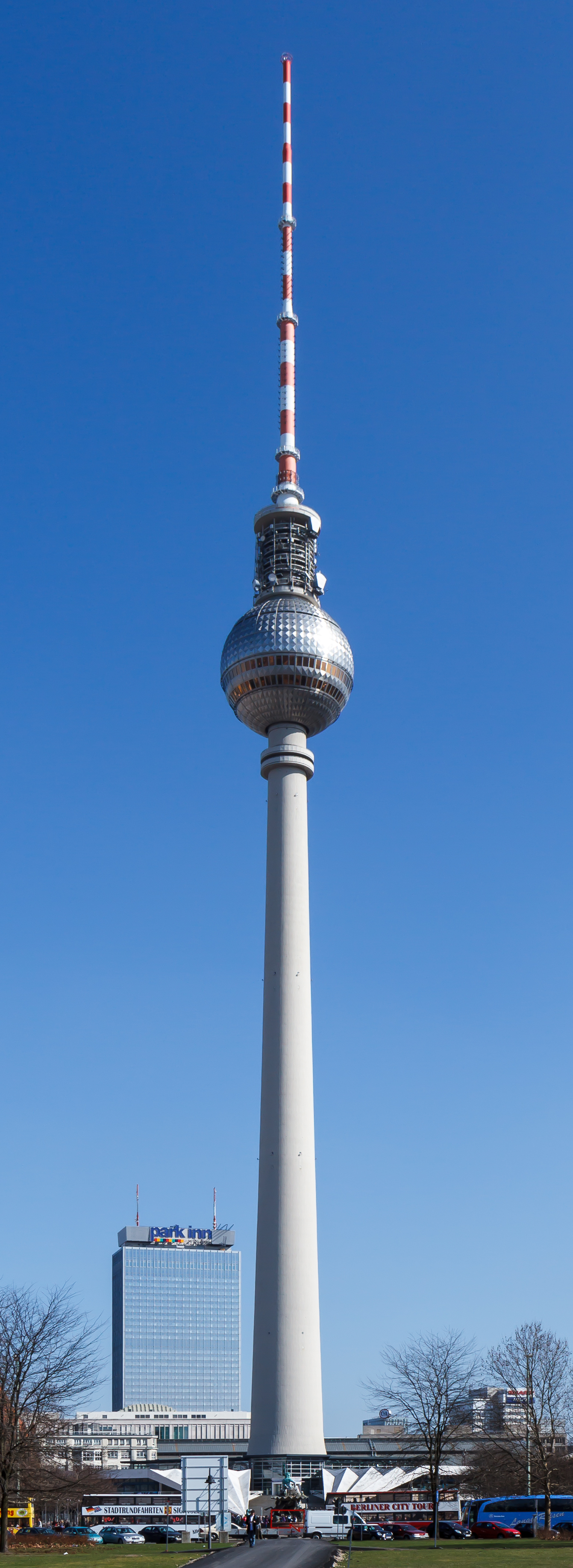
The Fernsehturm Berlin seen from a distance

During the 1960s and early 1970s, Alexanderplatz was extensively redeveloped as a prominent civic and commercial centre of East Berlin. The square was enlarged and its surroundings were reshaped with new modernist buildings, including the Haus des Lehrers, the Hotel Stadt Berlin (now the Park Inn Berlin), and the Haus des Reisens. The World Clock and the Fountain of Friendship between Peoples were installed as central elements of the redesign, and the landmark Fernsehturm was completed in 1969. During the Peaceful Revolution of 1989, the Alexanderplatz demonstration was held on 4 November. It was the largest non-state-directed demonstration in the history of the German Democratic Republic, with hundreds of thousands of participants calling for political reform and freedoms of expression, assembly and travel. The officially permitted demonstration brought together opposition activists and cultural figures as well as representatives of the ruling Socialist Unity Party and state authorities. Five days later, on 9 November, the Berlin Wall was opened.

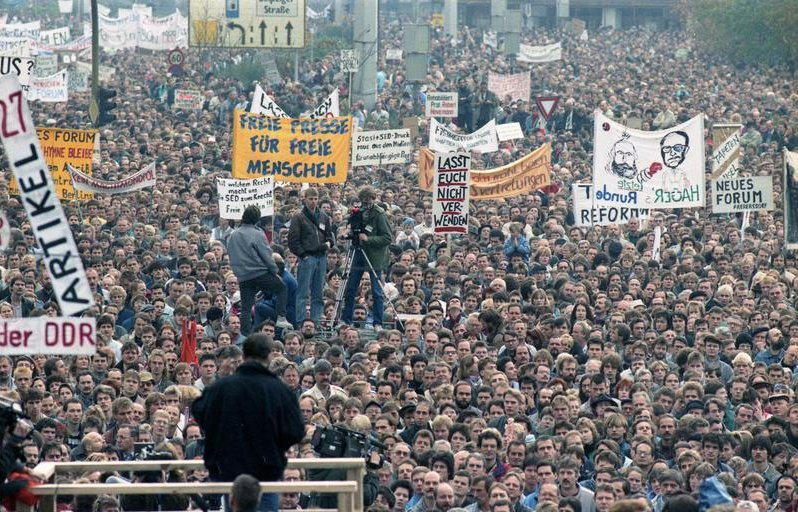
The 4 November 1989 Alexanderplatz demonstration

=== After German reunification (1989) ===
Ever since German reunification, Alexanderplatz has undergone a gradual process of change with many of the surrounding buildings being renovated. After the political turnaround in the wake of the fall of the Berlin Wall, socialist urban planning and architecture of the 1970s no longer corresponded to the current ideas of an inner-city square. Investors demanded planning security for their construction projects. After initial discussions with the public, the goal quickly arose to reinstate Alexanderplatz's tram network for better connections to surrounding city quarters. In 1993, an urban planning ideas competition for architects took place to redesign the square and its surrounding area.

In the first phase, there were 16 submissions, five of which were selected for the second phase of the competition. These five architects had to adapt their plans to detailed requirements. For example, the return of the Alex's trams was planned, with the implementation to be made in several stages.

The winner, who was determined on 17 September 1993, was the Berlin architect Hans Kollhoff. Kollhoff's plan was based on Behrens’ design, provided a horseshoe-shaped area of seven- to eight-storey buildings and 150-metre (490 ft) high towers with 42 floors. The Alexanderhaus and the Berolinahaus – both listed buildings – would form the southwestern boundary. Second place went to the design by Daniel Libeskind and Bernd Faskel. The proposal of the architecture firm Kny & Weber, which was strongly based on the horseshoe shape of Wagner, finally won the third place. The design by Kollhoff was chosen on 7 June 1994 by the Berlin Senate as a basis for the further transformation of Alexanderplatz.

In 1993, architect Hans Kollhoff's master plan for a major redevelopment including the construction of several skyscrapers was published.

In 1995, Landesbank Berlin completed the renovation of the Alexanderhaus. In 1998, the first tram returned to Alexanderplatz, and in 1999, the town planning contracts for the implementation of Kollhoff and Timmermann's plans were signed by the landowners and the investors.

=== 21st century ===
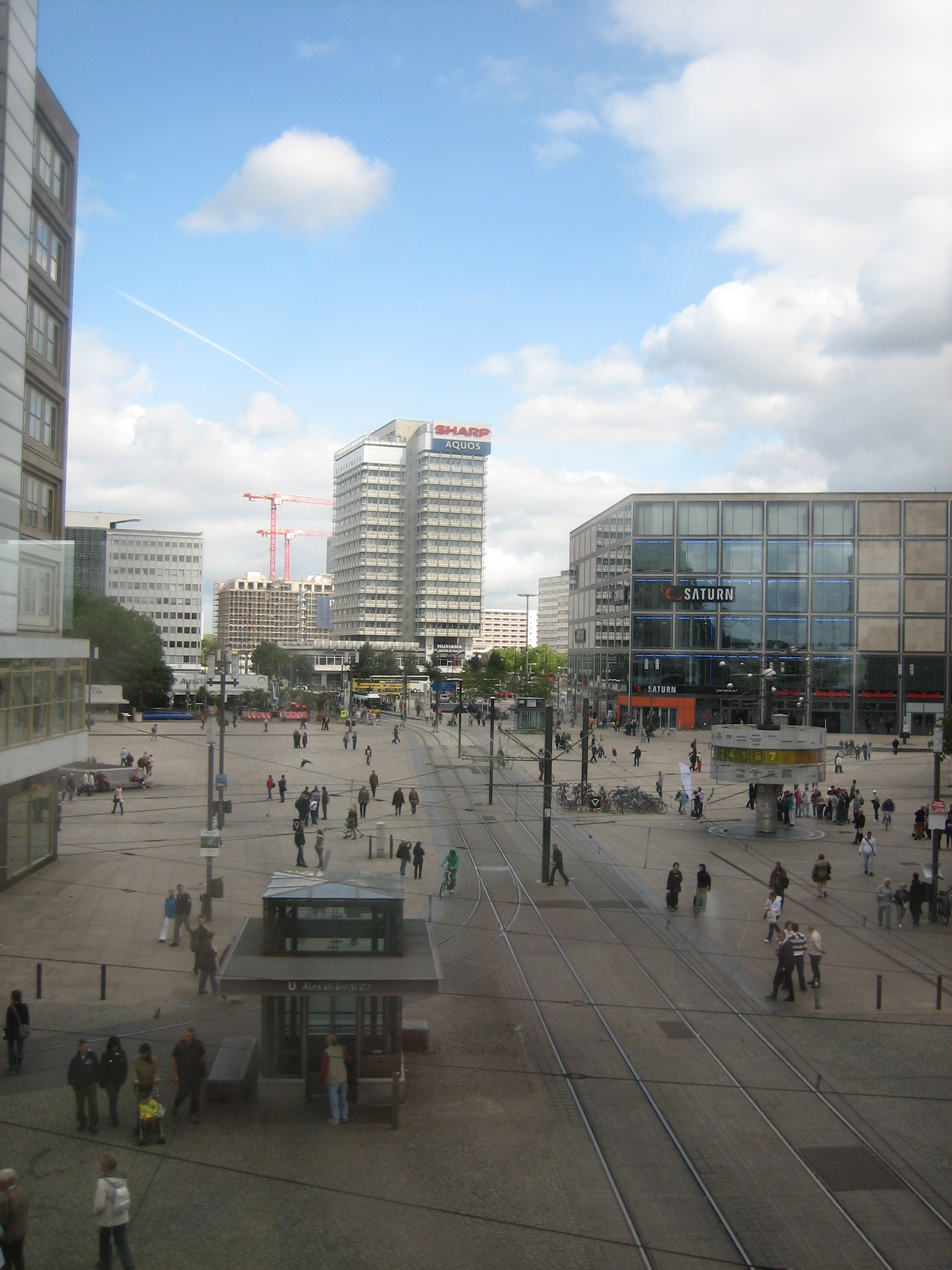
Alexanderplatz from the S-Bahn

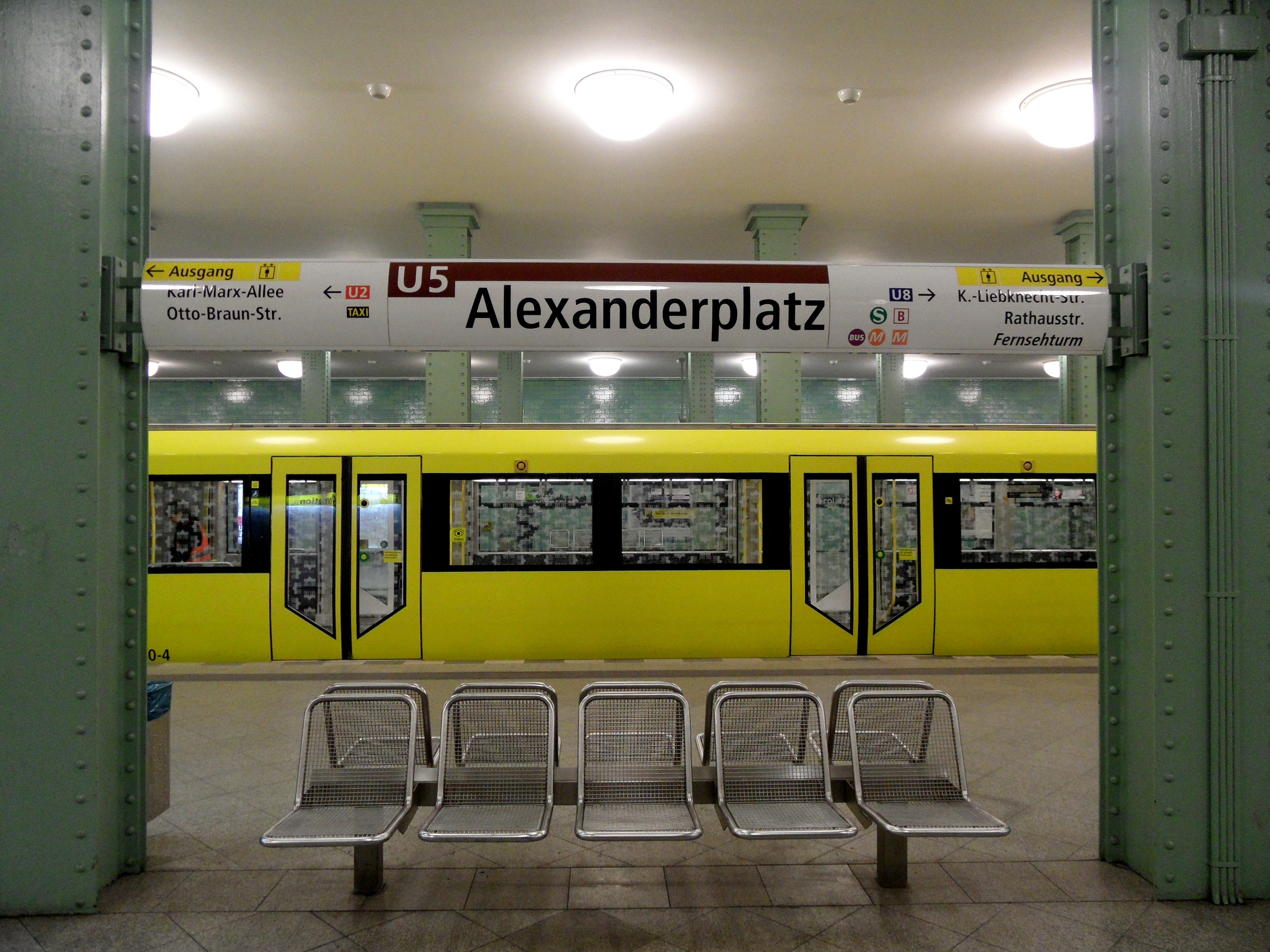
U-Bahn station at the alexanderplatz

The development plan for the central area of Alexanderplatz was approved by Senate in April 2000. During the following years, implementation of the post-reunification plans initially focused on existing buildings, public space and lower-rise development.

The CUBIX multiplex cinema, one of the first new buildings constructed at Alexanderplatz after German reunification, was completed in September 2001 and became a venue of the Berlin International Film Festival in 2007.

The former Centrum Warenhaus was extensively modernized between 2004 and 2006 as Galeria Kaufhof according to design by architect Josef Paul Kleihues, while Berolinahaus was also being renovated. Alexanderplatz itself was redesigned following a landscape-design competition held in 2003. The winning proposal by Gerkan, Marg and Partners and WES LandschaftsArchitekturwas implemented in 2007.

Transport infrastructure around the square was also renewed, as tram service had returned to Alexanderplatz in 1998 and was further extended in the following decade. The long-running renovation of Alexanderplatz U-Bahn station was completed in 2008.

Alexa shopping center opened in September 2007 and with a 56,200 m^{2} (605,000 sq ft) sales area, it is one of the largest shopping centres in Berlin. In May 2007, the development company Hines began building a six-story commercial building die mitte, which was completed in 2009.

The residential and commercial building Alea 101 was completed in 2014.

In 2014, the high-rise buildings proposed in the 1993 master plan were still considered unlikely to be realised. The development concept was revised following a planning in 2015, and two proposed high-rises were abandoned in favour of retaining Haus des Reisens and Haus des Berliner Verlages. The plans to demolish the Park Inn tower were also dropped.

By 2026, two major high-rise projects were under construction around Alexanderplatz: the 130-metre (430 ft) Covivio tower and the 146-metre (479 ft) The Berlinian. Construction of the 150-metre (490 ft) Alexander Tower next to the Alexa shopping centre had been suspended since 2022.

A further 150-metre (490 ft) high-rise is planned by Hines on development site D4 at Alexanderstraße and Otto-Braun-Straße. A design by Frank Gehry won an architectural competition for the project in 2014, but was no longer being pursued by 2026. The final design and construction schedule had not yet been determined.

== Today and future plans ==
Despite the reconstruction of the tram line crossing, it has retained its socialist character, including the much-graffitied Fountain of Friendship between Peoples, a popular venue.

Alexanderplatz is reputedly the most visited area of Berlin, beating Friedrichstrasse and City West. It is a popular starting point for tourists, with many attractions including the Fernsehturm (TV tower), the Nikolai Quarter and the Rotes Rathaus ('Red City Hall') situated nearby. Alexanderplatz is still one of Berlin's major commercial areas, housing various shopping malls, department stores and other large retail locations.

Many historic buildings are located in the vicinity of Alexanderplatz. The traditional seat of city government, the Rotes Rathaus, or 'Red City Hall', is located nearby, as was the former East German parliament building, the Palast der Republik. The Palast was demolished from 2006–2008 to make room for a full reconstruction of the Baroque Berlin Palace, or Stadtschloss.

Alexanderplatz is also the name of the S-Bahn and U-Bahn stations there. It is one of Berlin's largest and most important transportation hubs, being a meeting place of three subway (U-Bahn) lines, three S-Bahn lines, and many tram and bus lines, as well as regional trains.

It also accommodates the Park Inn Berlin and the World Time Clock, a continually rotating installation that shows the time throughout the globe, the House of Travel, and Hermann Henselmann's Haus des Lehrers (House of Teachers)'.

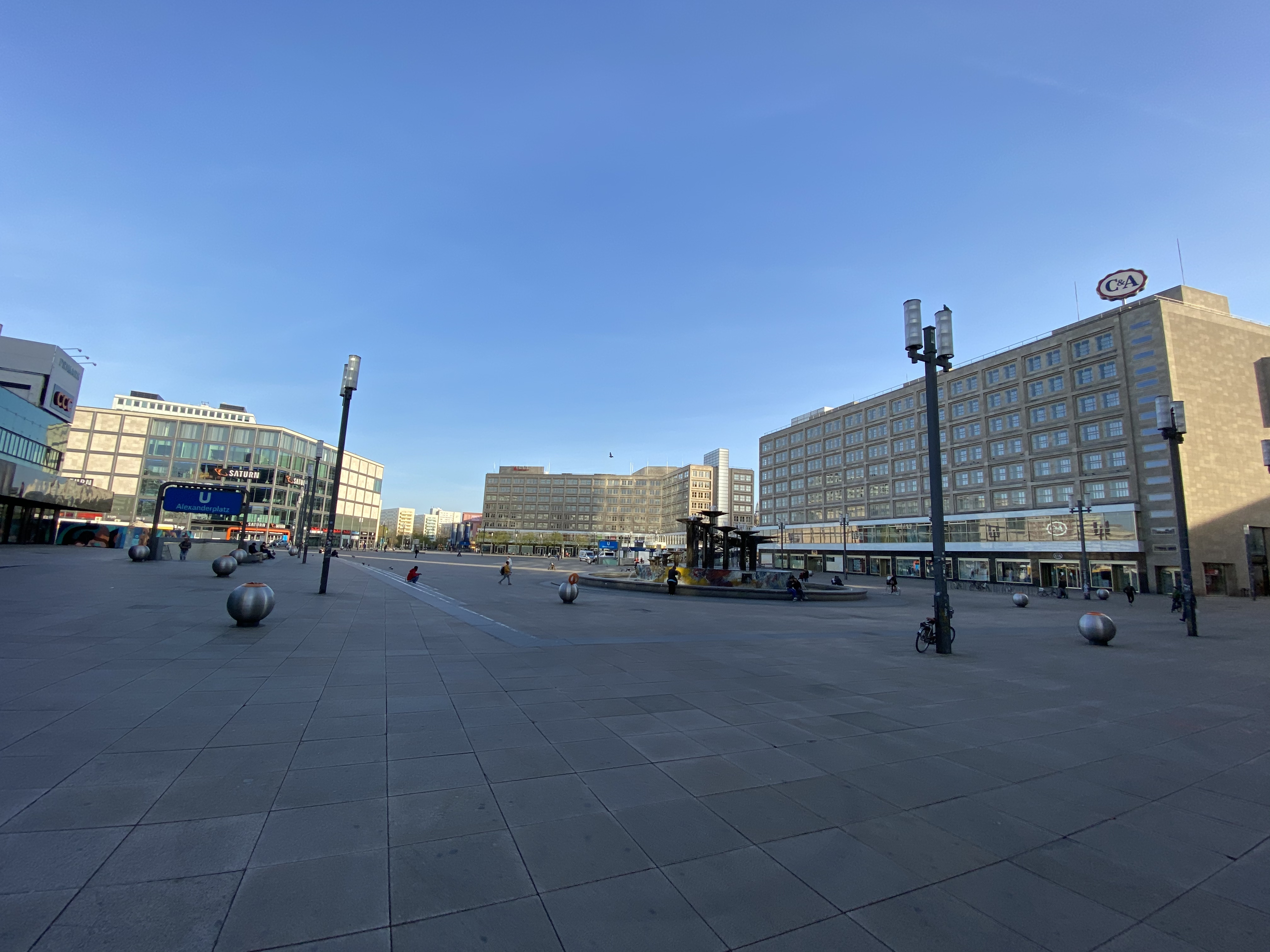
Alexanderplatz on 11 April 2020 at 18:28 during COVID-19 lockdown in Berlin

Long-term plans exist for the demolition of the 125-metre (410 ft) high former Interhotel Stadt Berlin (now the Hotel Park-Inn), with the site to be replaced by three skyscrapers. If and when this plan will be implemented is unclear, especially since the hotel tower received a new façade as recently as in 2005, and the occupancy rates of the hotel are very good. However, the plans could give way in the next few years to a suggested 35-metre (115 ft) high new block conversion. The previous main tenant of the development, Saturn, moved into the die mitte building in March 2009. In 2014, Primark opened a branch inside the hotel building.

The majority of the planned 150-metre (490 ft) high skyscrapers will probably never be built. The state of Berlin has announced that it will not enforce the corresponding urban development contracts against the market. Of the 13 planned skyscrapers, 10 remained as of 2008, after modifications to the plans – eight of which had construction rights. Some investors in the Alexa shopping centre announced several times since 2007 that they would sell their respective shares in the plot to an investor interested in building a high-rise building.

The first concrete plans for the construction of a high-rise were made by Hines, the investor behind die mitte. In 2009, the construction of a 150-metre (490 ft) high tower to be built behind die mitte was announced. On 12 September 2011, a slightly modified development plan was presented, which provided for a residential tower housing 400 apartments. In early 2013, the development plan was opened to the public.

In autumn 2015, the Berlin Senate organized two forums in which interested citizens could express their opinions on the proposed changes to the Platz. Architects, city planners and Senate officials held open discussions. On that occasion, however, it was reiterated that the plans for high-rise developments were not up for debate. According to the master plan of the architect Hans Kollhoff, up to eleven huge buildings will continue to be built, which will house a mixture of shops and apartments.

== Roads and public transport ==
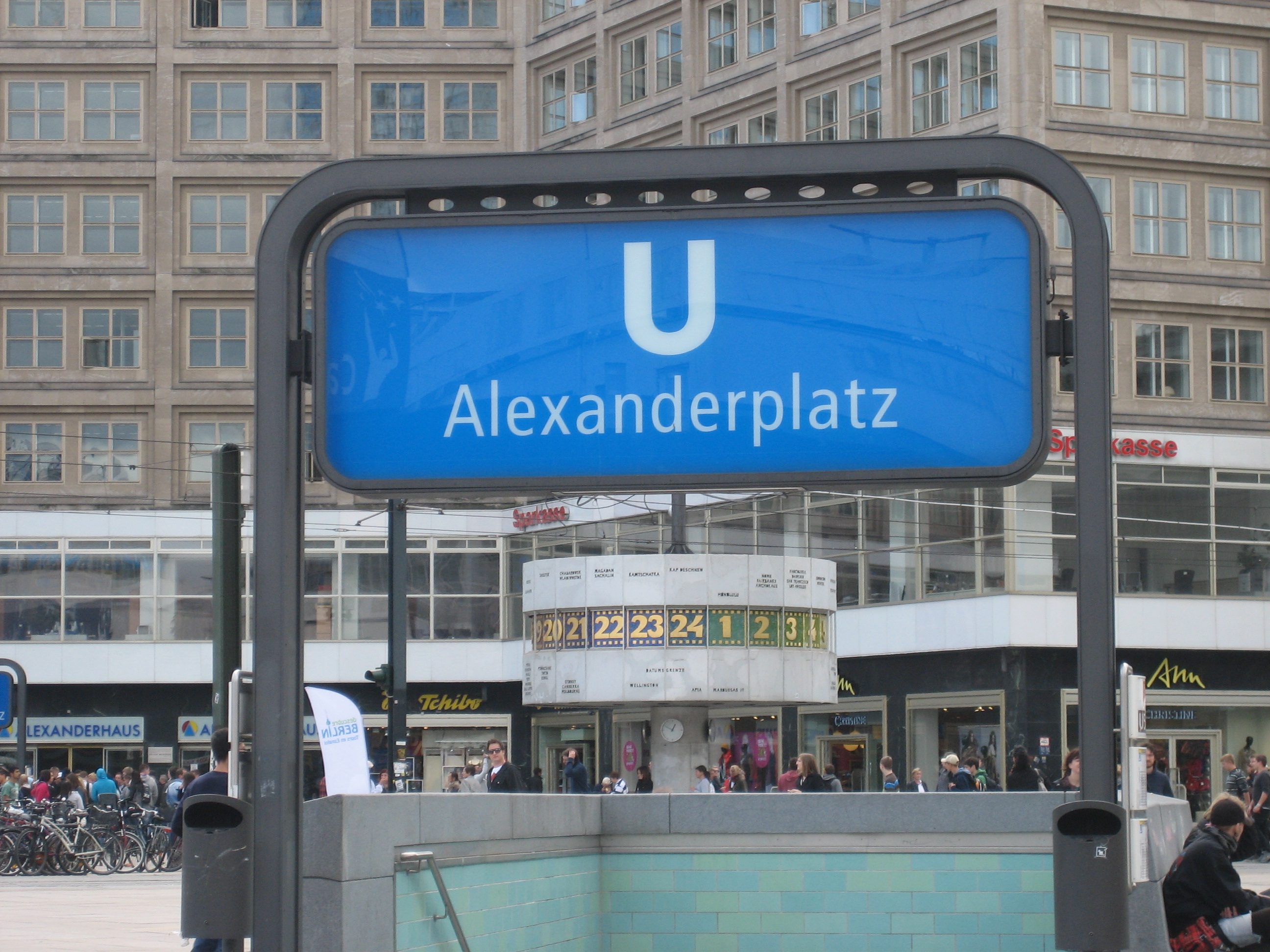
Alexanderplatz U-bahn station

During the post-war reconstruction of the 1960s, Alexanderplatz was completely pedestrianized. Since then, trams were reintroduced to the area in 1998.

Alexanderplatz station provides S-Bahn connections, access to the U2, U5 and U8 subway lines, regional train lines for DB Regio and ODEG services and, on weekends, the Harz-Berlin-Express (HBX). Several tram and bus lines also service the area.

The following main roads connect to Alexanderplatz:

- Northwest: Karl-Liebknecht-Straße (federal highways B 2 and B 5)
- Northeast: Alexanderstraße (B 2 and B 5)
- Southeast: Grunerstraße / Alexanderstraße (B 1)
- Southwest (in front of the S-Bahn station, in the pedestrian zone): Dircksenstraße

Several arterial roads lead radially from Alexanderplatz to the outskirts of Berlin. These include (clockwise from north to south-east):

- Memhardstraße / Rosa-Luxemburg-Straße – Rosa-Luxemburg-Platz – Schönhauser Allee (to Bundesstraße 96a)
- Karl-Liebknecht-Straße – intersection Mollstraße/Prenzlauer Tor – Prenzlauer Allee (main road 109 to the Pankow triangle at the Berliner Ring)
- Grunerstraße / Alexanderstraße – Otto-Braun-Straße (B 2) – (intersection Mollstraße) – Greifswalder Straße (B 2 via Berliner Allee to the Barnim junction at Berliner Ring)

Karl-Marx-Allee (B 1 and B 5) – Strausberger Platz – Karl-Marx-Allee / Frankfurter Tor – Frankfurter Allee (B 1 and B 5 to Berlin-Hellersdorf junction at Berliner Ring)

== Structures ==
The World Clock and Park Inn hotel in the background

=== World Clock ===
The World Clock (‹See Tfd›German: Weltzeituhr), is a large turret-style world clock located. By reading the markings on its metal rotunda, the current time for 148 major cities from around the world can be determined. Since its erection by the German Democratic Republic in 1969, it has been a tourist attraction and meeting place.

=== Berolina ===
Berolina is the female personification (Note: The traditional Latin name of Berlin is the neuter Berolinum.) of Berlin and the allegorical female figure symbolizing the city. One of the best-known portraits of Berolina is the statue that once stood in Alexanderplatz.

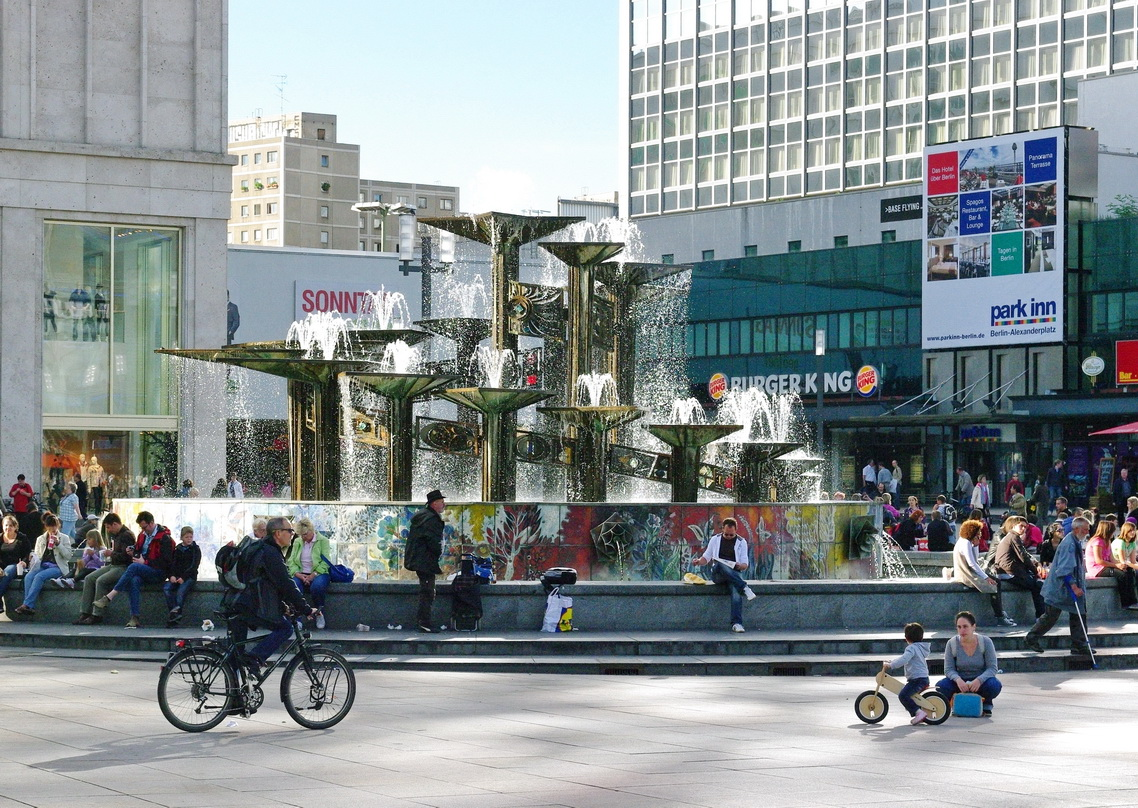
Fountain of Friendship

=== Fountain of Friendship ===
The Fountain of Friendship (Brunnen der Völkerfreundschaft) was erected in 1970 during the redesign of Alexanderplatz and inaugurated on October 7. It was created by Walter Womacka and his group of artists. Its water basin has a diameter of 23 meters, it is 6.20 meters high and is built from embossed copper, glass, ceramics and enamel. The water spurts from the highest point and then flows down in spirals over 17 shells, which each have a diameter between one and four meters. After German reunification, it was completely renovated in a metal art workshop during the reconstruction of the Galeria Kaufhof.

=== Other ===
Apart from Hackescher Markt, Alexanderplatz is the only existing square in front of one of the medieval gates of Berlin's city well.

== Image gallery ==
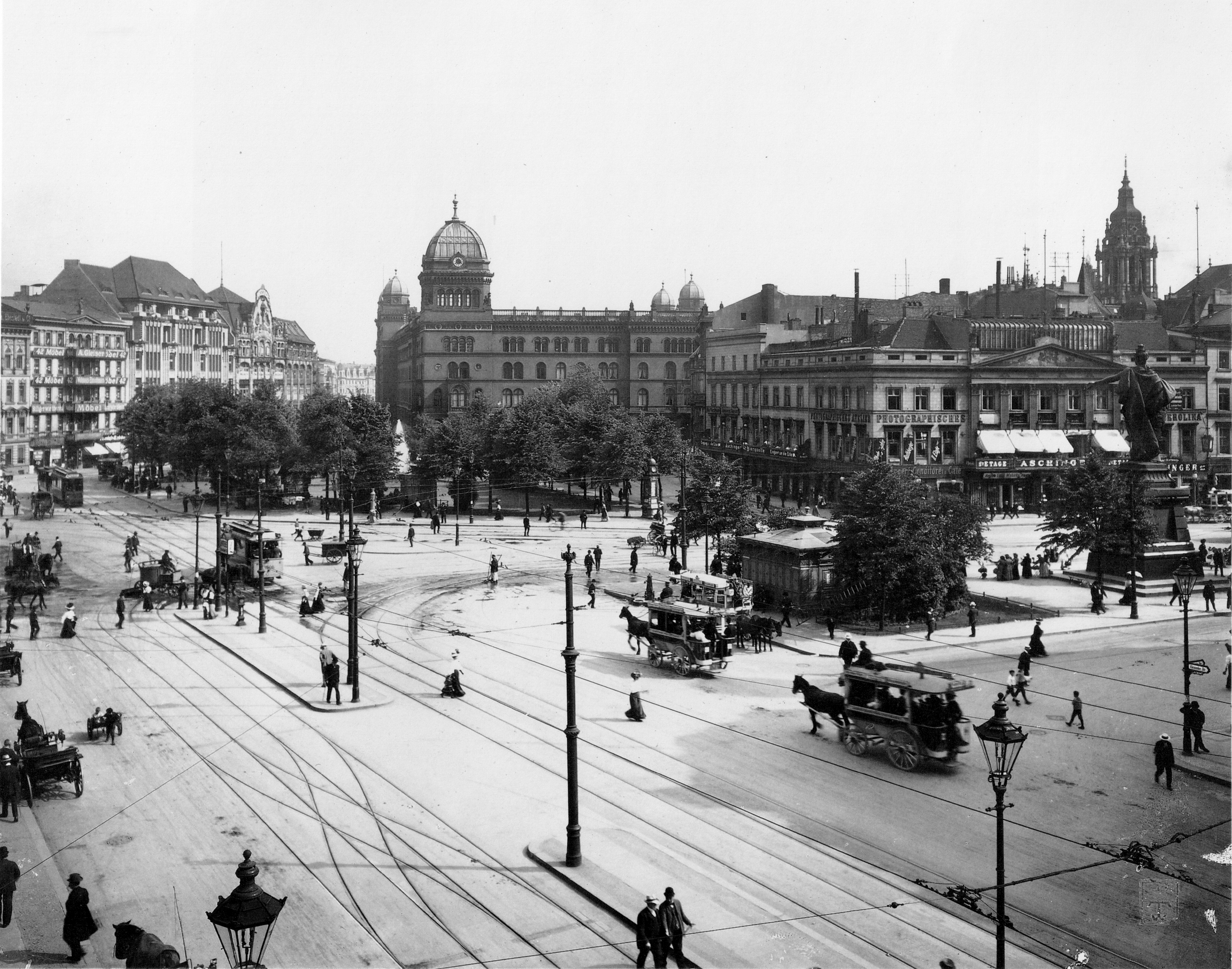
Alexanderplatz, 1908 (left to right: Lehrervereinshaus, Polizeipräsidium, Aschinger)

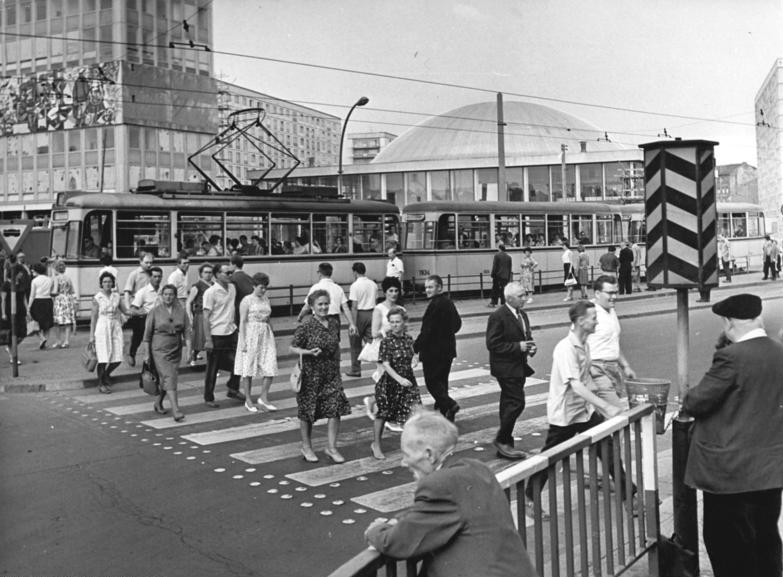
Trams at Alexanderplatz

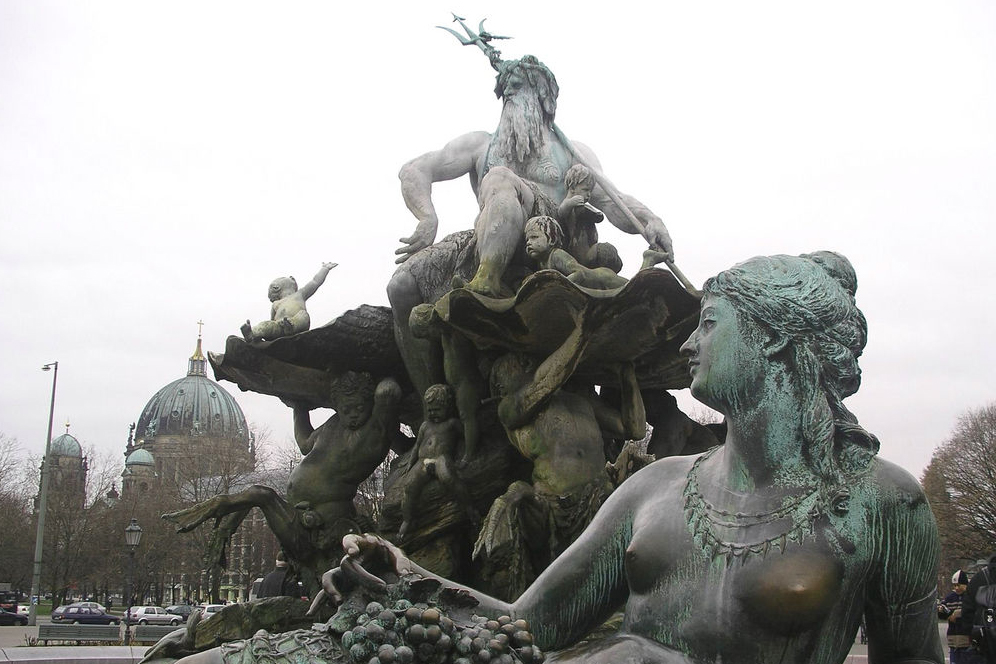
Neptunbrunnen

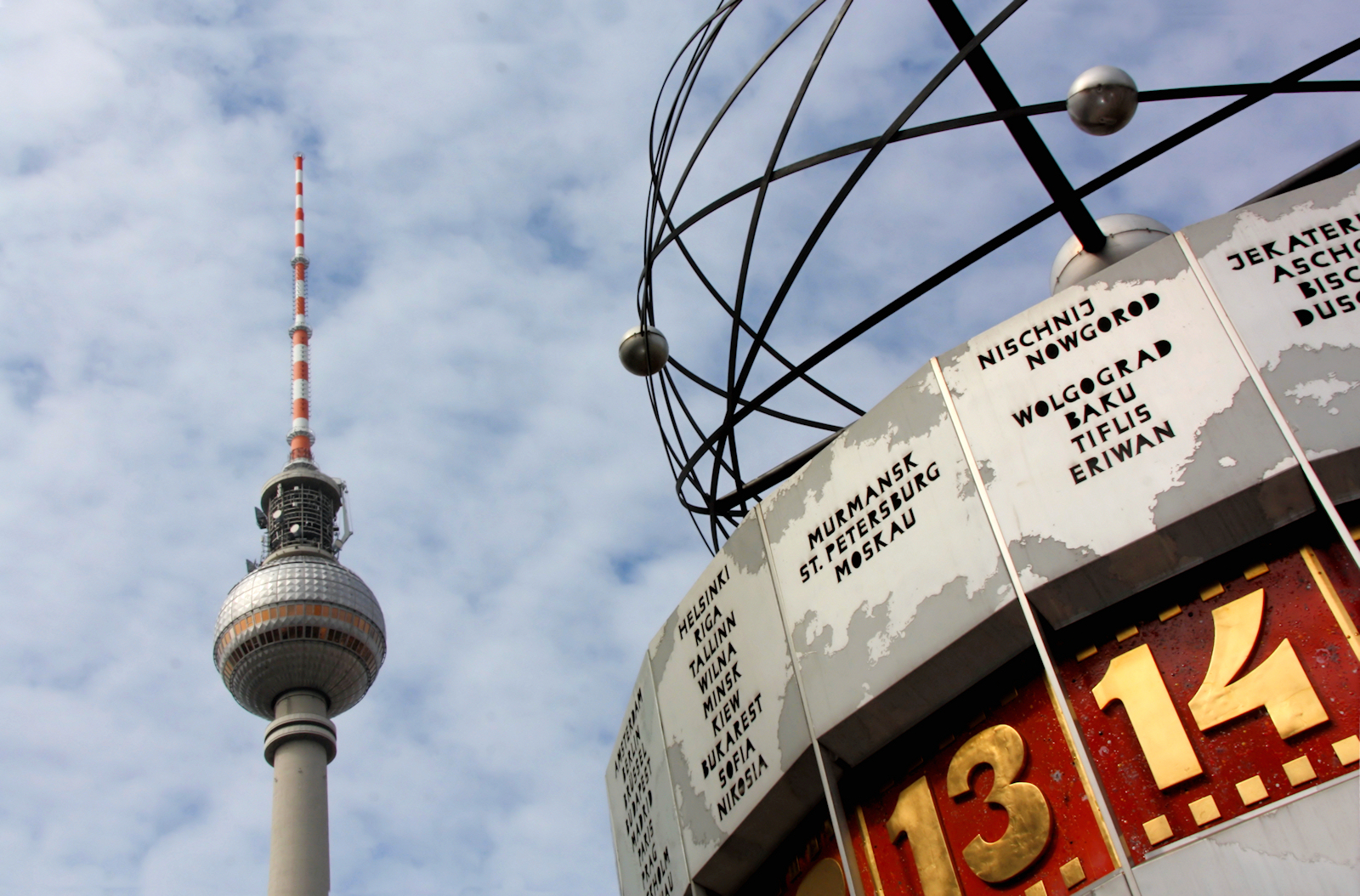
The World Clock with the Fernsehturm in the background

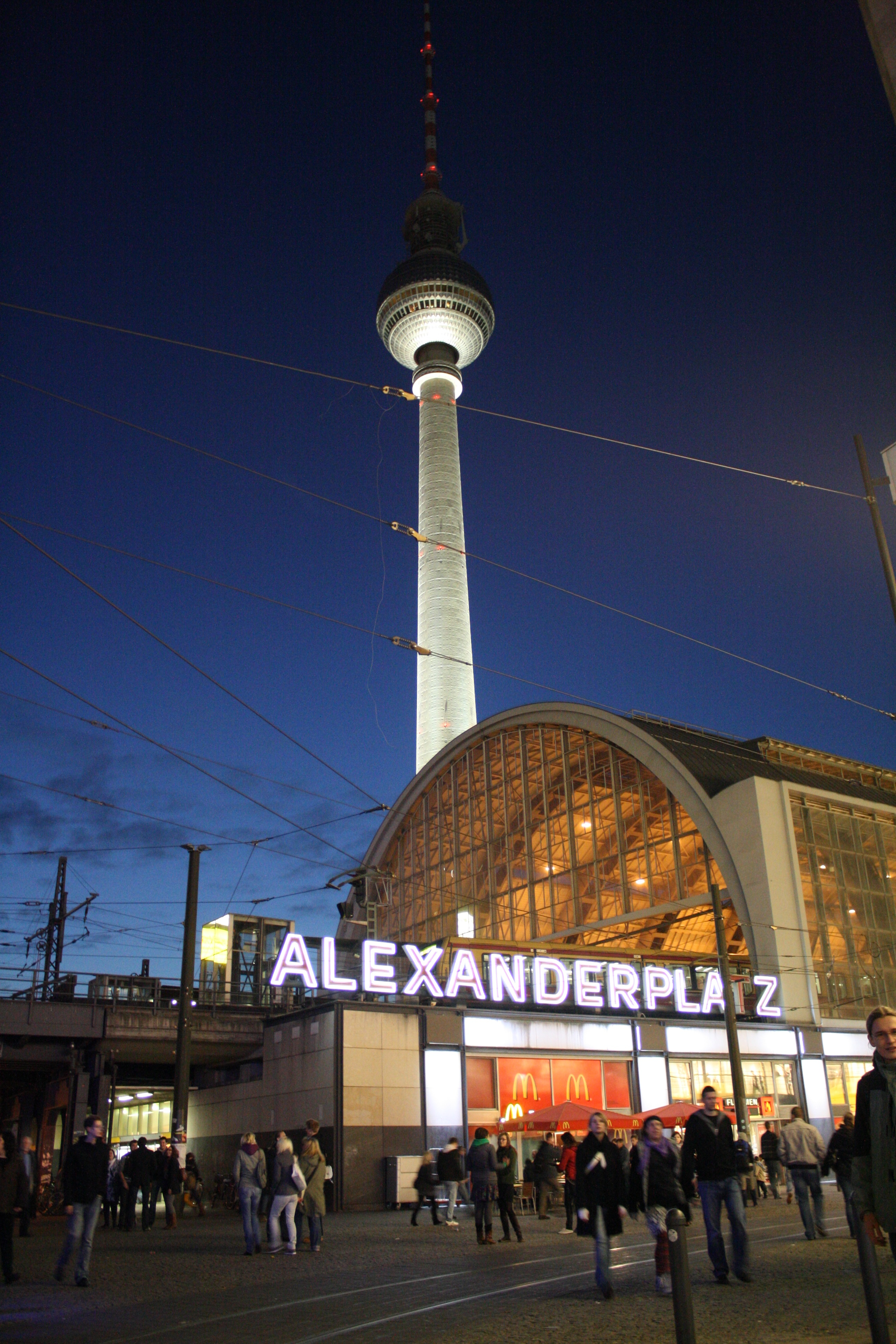
Bahnhof Alexanderplatz and the Fernsehturm

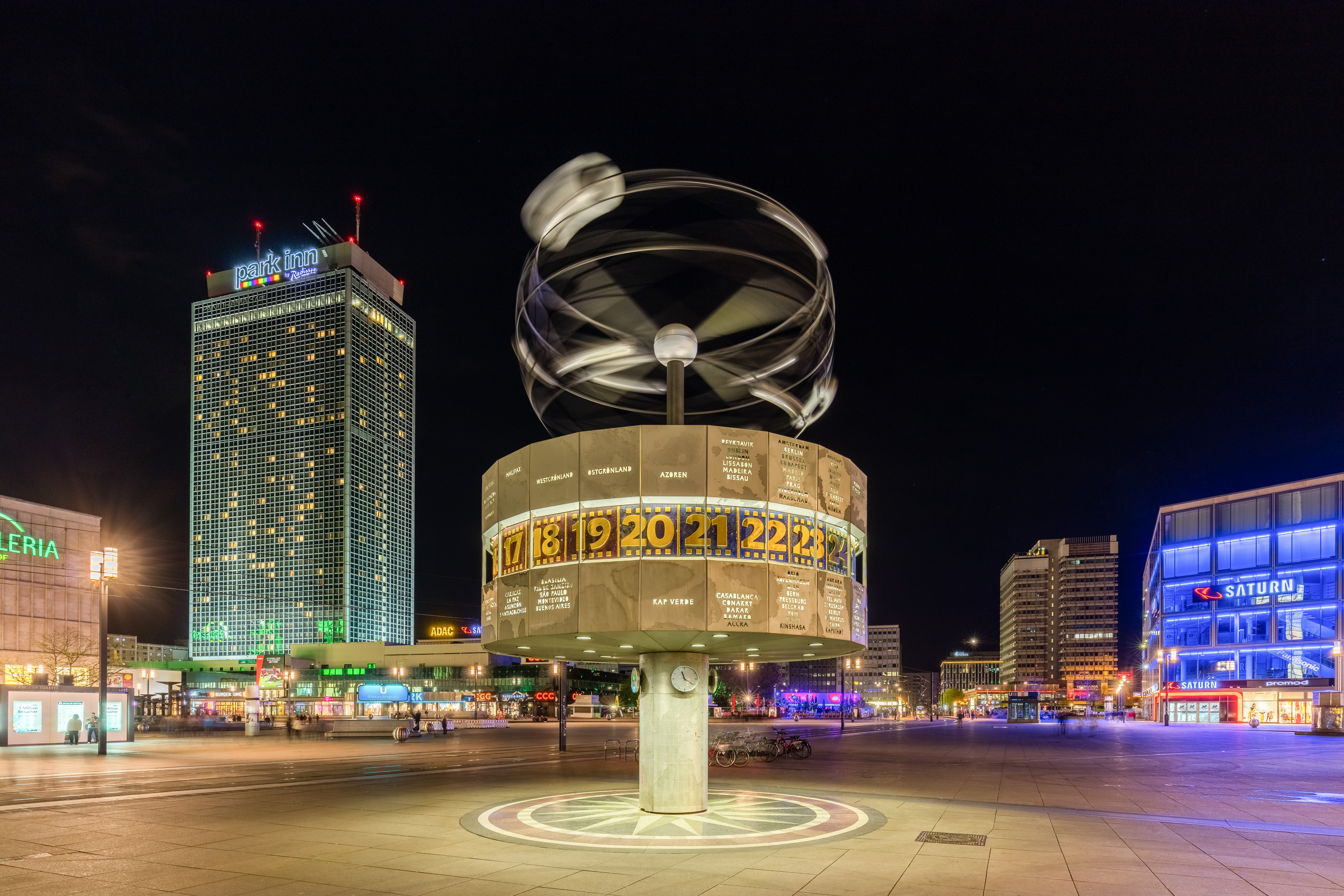
Night view of the World Clock

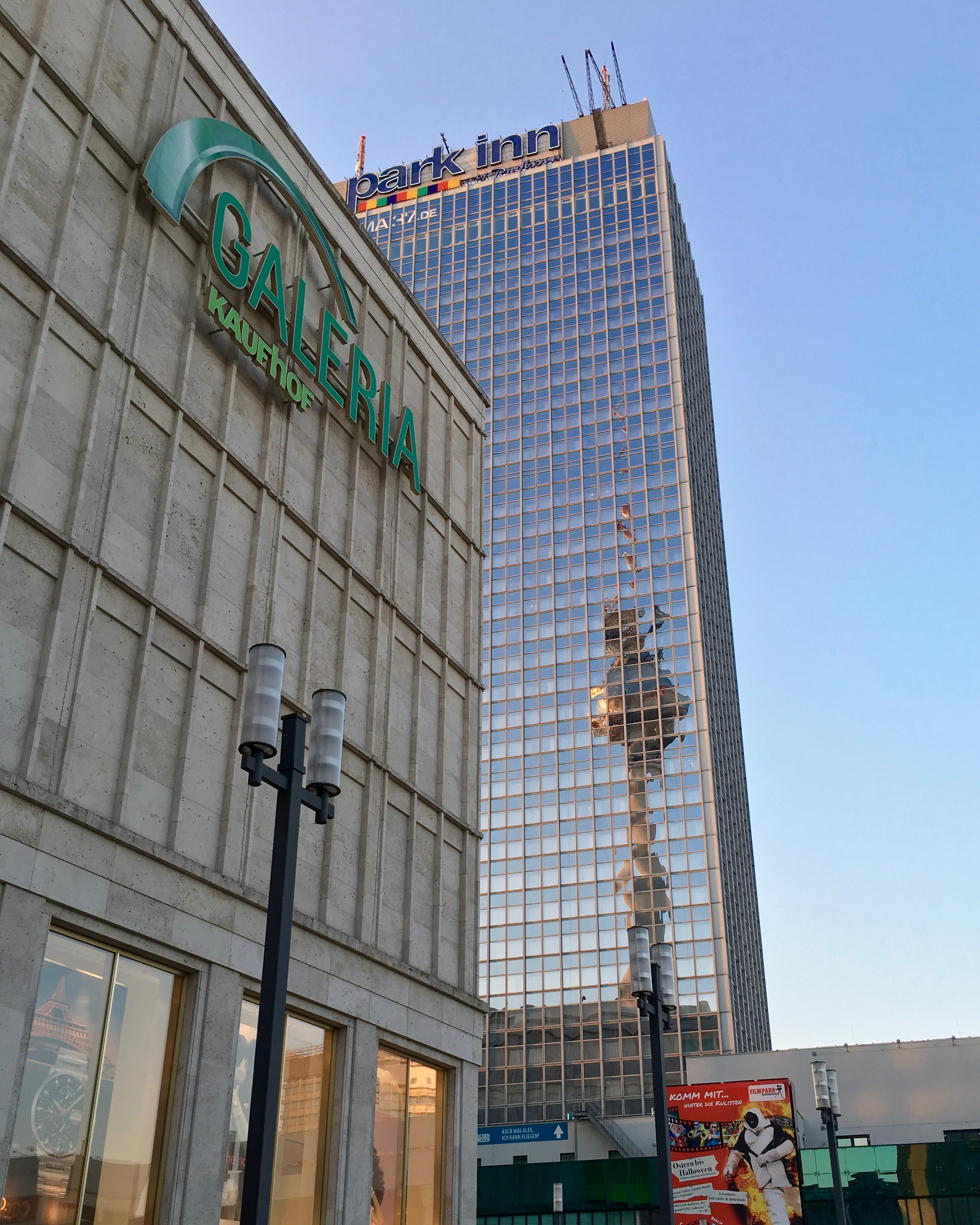
Park Inn with a reflection from the Fernsehturm

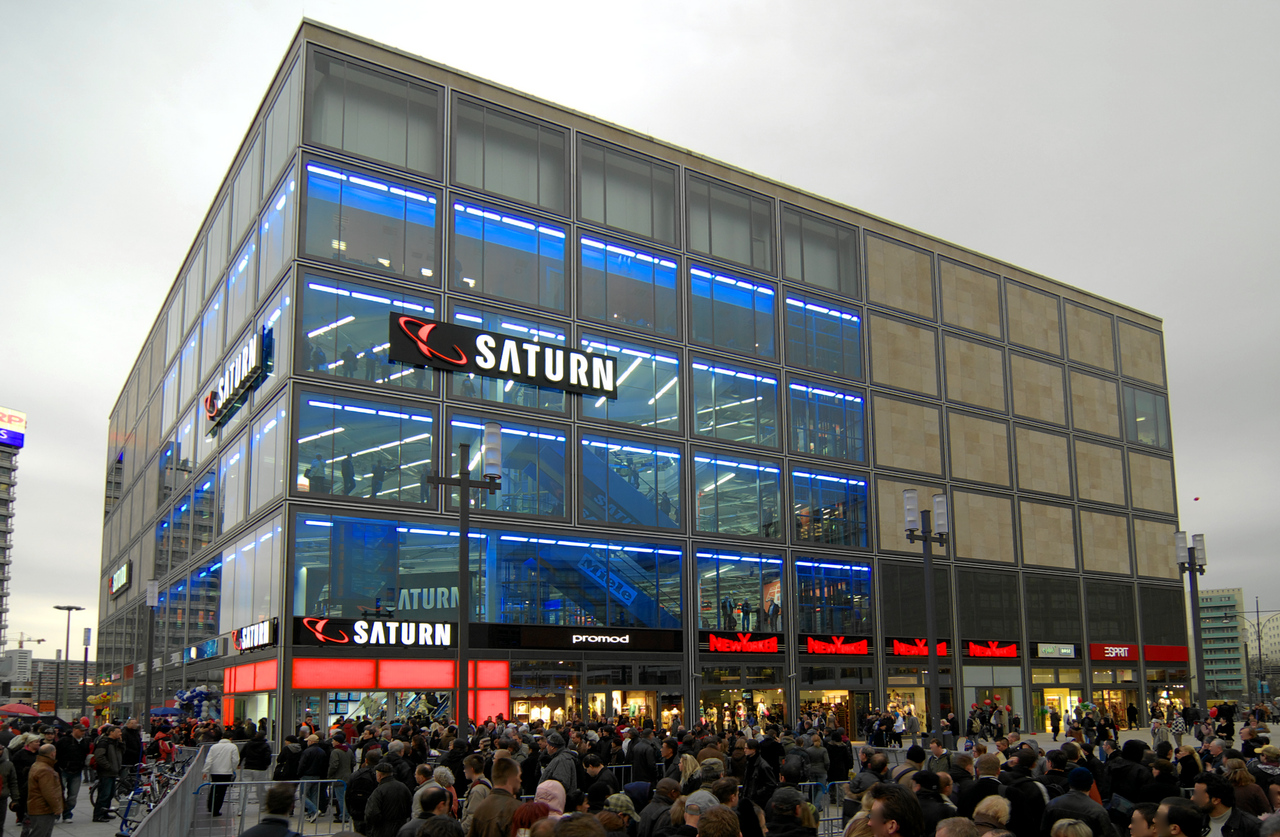
Die Mitte shopping mall

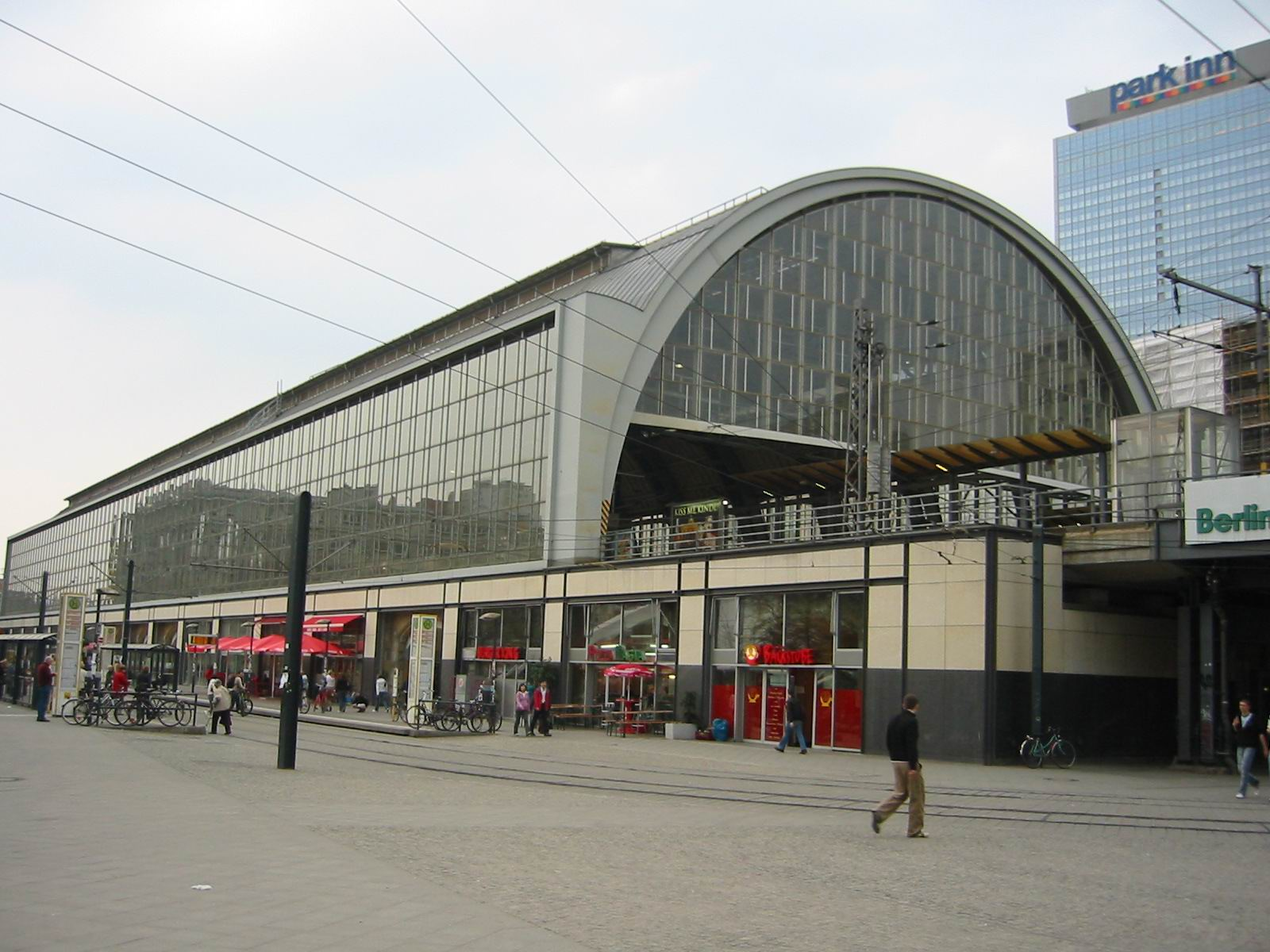
Bahnhof Alexanderplatz

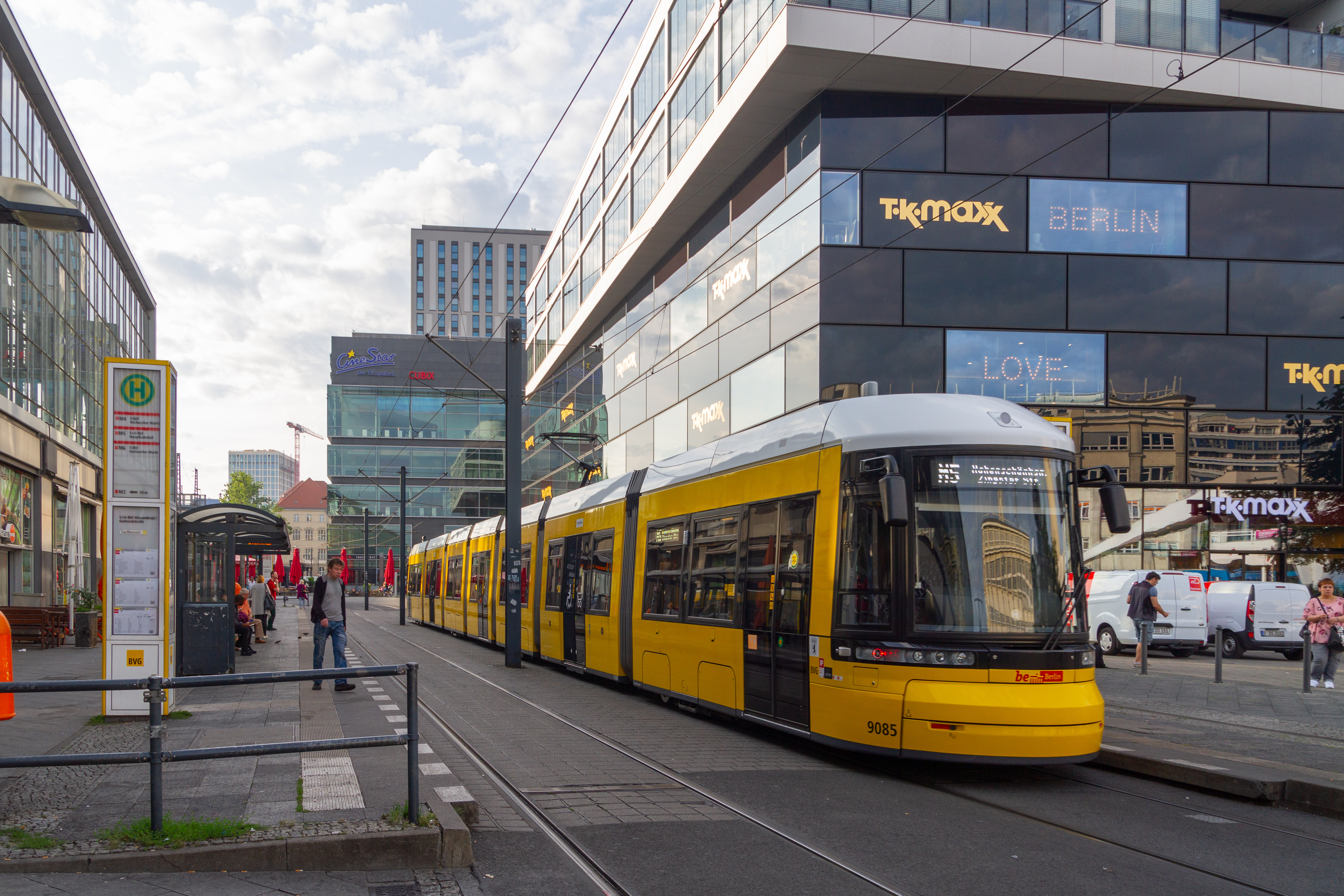
Modern tram

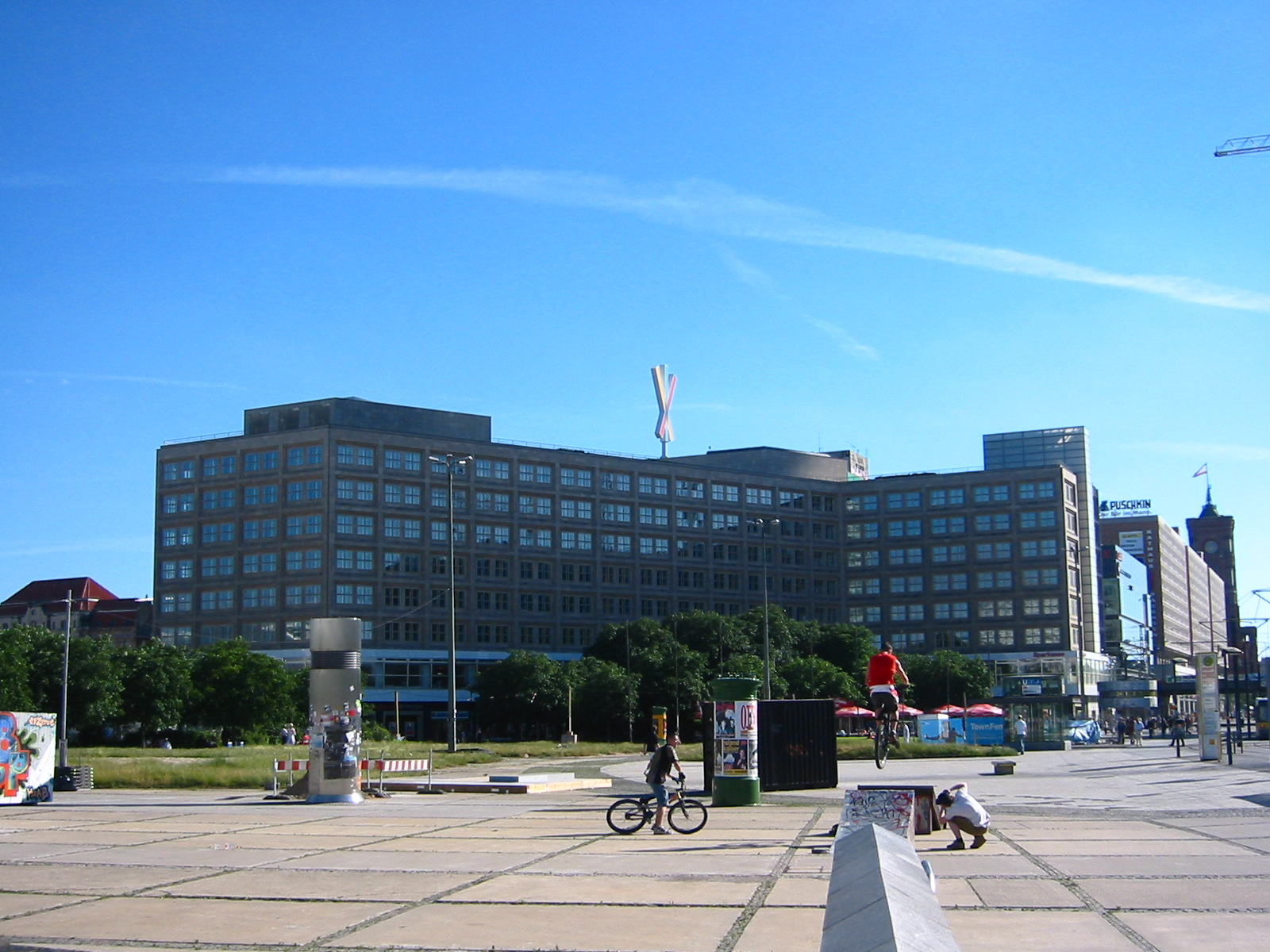
Alexanderhaus

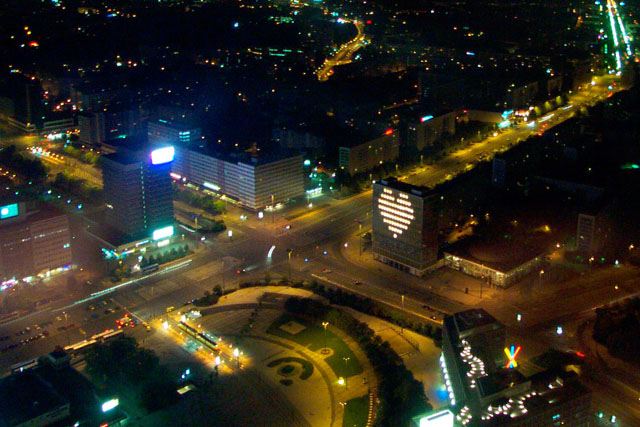
Project Blinkenlights
