= House of Travel =

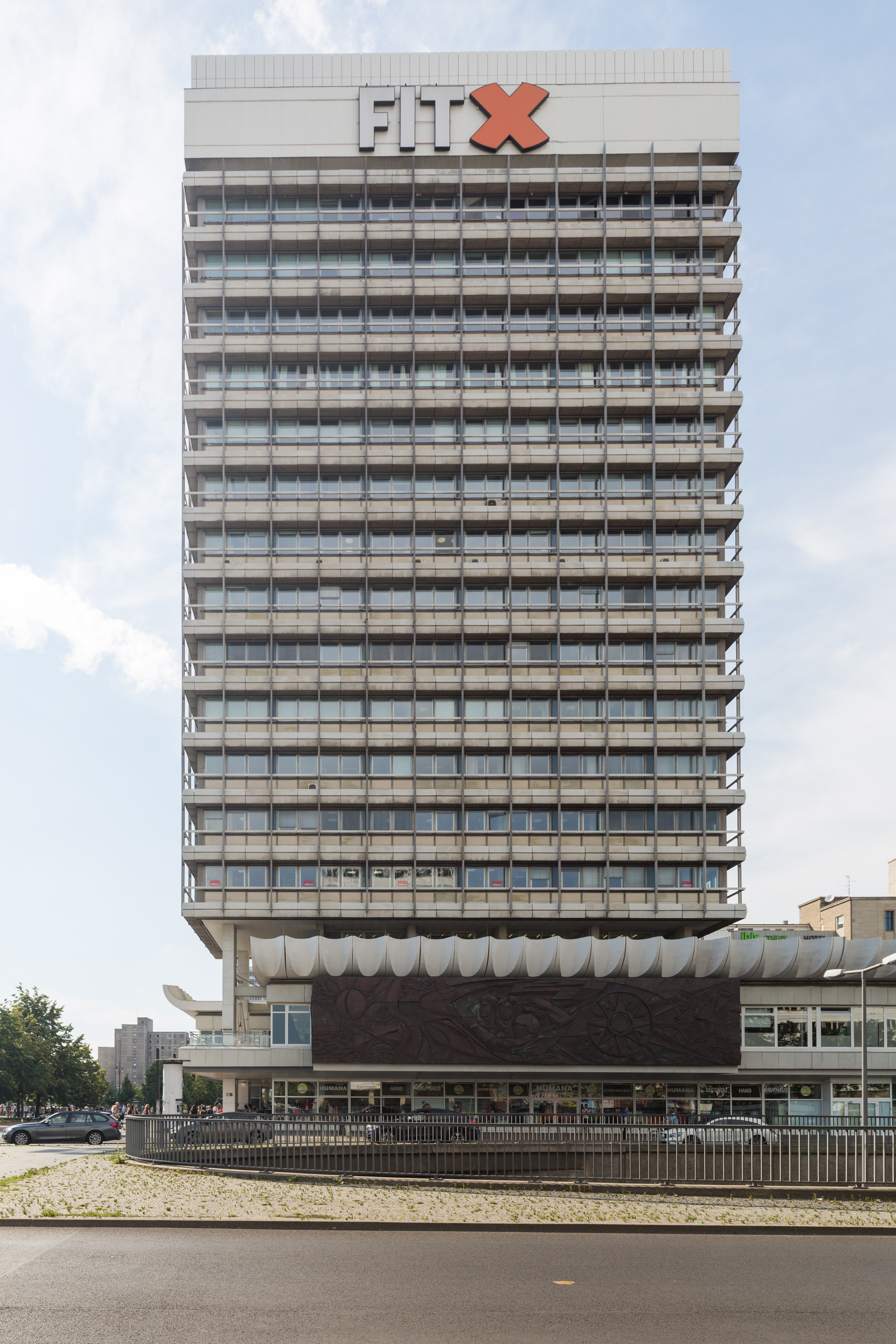
- House of Travel from east

- Location within Berlin

General information
- Status: Completed
- Location: Berlin, Germany
- Coordinates: 52°31′22″N 13°24′59″E
- Construction started: 1969
- Completed: 26 October 1971; 54 years ago

Height
- Height: 67 m (219.82 ft)

Technical details
- Floor count: 18

Design and construction
- Architects: Roland Korn, Johannes Brieske, and Roland Steiger

The House of Travel (German: Haus des Reisens) is a 18-story building at Alexanderplatz in the Mitte district of Berlin. It was completed in 1971 and is located at Alexanderstraße 7.

== History ==
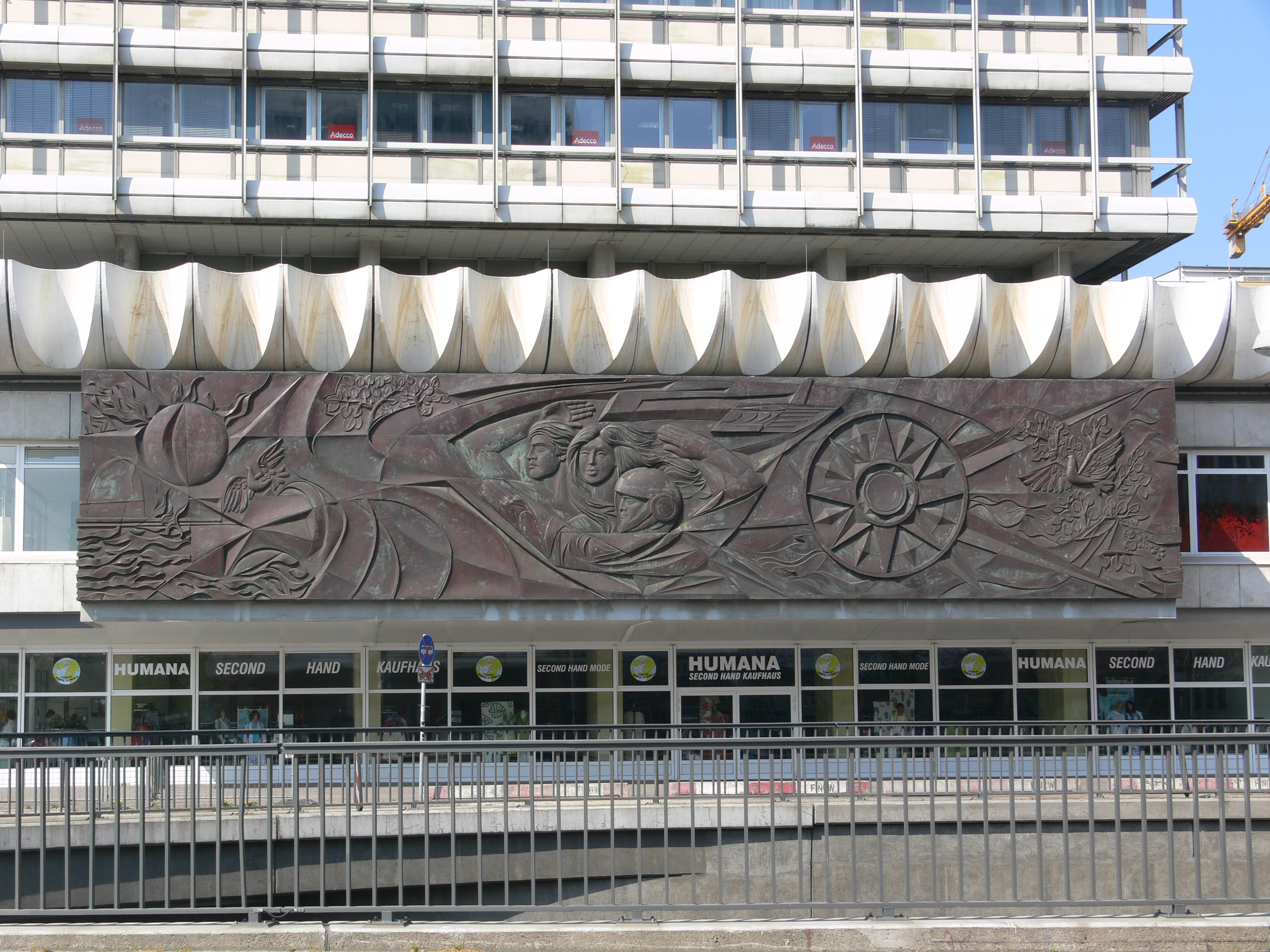
Copper relief, “Man Overcomes Time and Space” by Walter Womacka

The House of Travel was designed by Roland Korn, Johannes Brieske, and Roland Steiger as part of the Alexanderplatz reconstruction project. The building was constructed from September 12, 1969 to October 26, 1971. The building housed the head office of the Reisebüro der DDR, and the offices of Interflug until 1989. There was a small cafe with a bar in the building. Nothing of the original interior was retained after the GDR dissolved in 1990. In 1993, the building was supposed to be demolished and replaced with a 140-story skyscraper, according to plans of Hans Kollhoff and Helga Timmermann, but the demolition didn't happen. The realization of this project remains uncertain.

In July 2015, the House of Travel was placed under monumental protection.

== Architecture ==
The House of Travel architecture is in the International Style, the skyscraper walls consist of Aluminum construction. The skyscraper is surround by a two-story base which consist of two slightly shifted structures, the roofs of which have unusual wave-like moldings which curve upwards. On the eastern facade of the building on the level of the second floor there is a copper relief work by Walter Womacka. It's named "Der Mensch überwindet Zeit und Raum" (English: Man Overcomes Time and Space).
