= Walter Womacka =

German painter

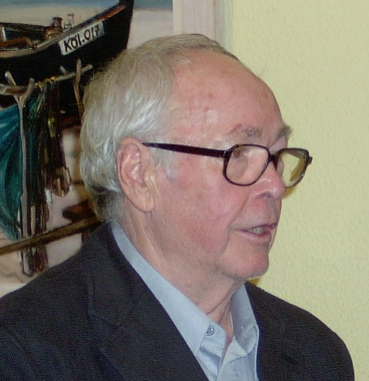
- Womacka (2006)
- Born: 22 December 1925; Horní Jiřetín, Czechoslovakia
- Died: 18 September 2010 (aged 84); Berlin, Germany
- Burial place: Zentralfriedhof Friedrichsfelde
- Employer: Weißensee Academy of Art Berlin (1968–1988)

Walter Womacka (22 December 1925 – 18 September 2010) was a German Socialist Realist artist. His work was pioneering early German Democratic Republic (GDR) aesthetics.

== Biography ==
Walter Womacka was born on 22 December 1925 in Horní Jiřetín, Czechoslovakia. He lived in East Berlin for most of his life. During World War II he did military service. Between 1946 and 1951, he studied art in Braunschweig, Weimar, and Dresden in Germany.

In 1954, he moved back to Berlin. Womacka was the head of the Weißensee Academy of Art Berlin (former German name: Hochschule für Bildende und Angewandte Kunst Berlin-Weißensee), from 1968 until 1988. He had many notable students, including Georg Baselitz.

In 1962, he created his most famous work, the oil painting "Am Strand", in which his daughter and younger brother were models. This work was a best selling reproduction, it was also used for German postage stamps.

In the post-war rebuilding of Berlin, he designed many large public artworks, including stained glass windows using the gemmail technique and large external murals in mosaic. These artworks showing the socialist ideal of "ordinary people" contributing to society are found decorating the buildings of government departments and factories. The Haus des Lehrers ("House of Teachers"- Education Department) on Alexanderplatz in the centre of East Berlin is decorated with a frieze showing the benefits of education. This work was fully restored between 2002 and 2004 after many years of neglect.

Womacka died in Berlin, Germany on 18 September 2010. He is buried in Zentralfriedhof Friedrichsfelde in Berlin.

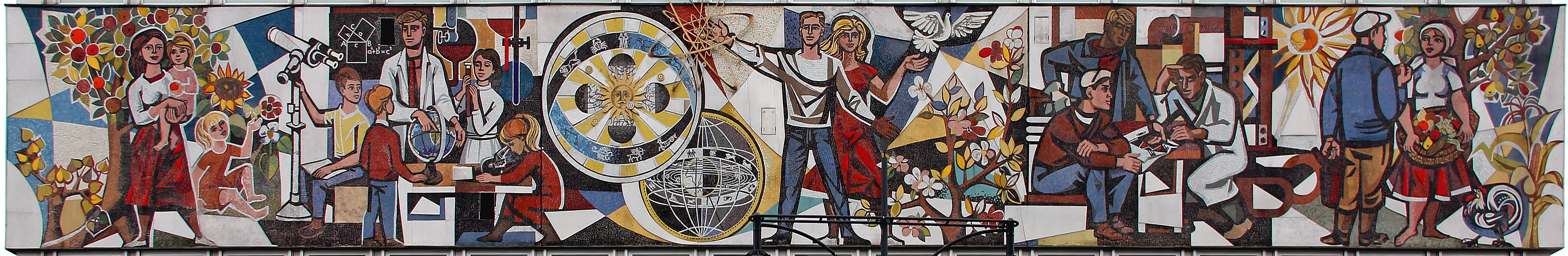
natural stone mosaic (1964) at the Haus des Lehrers (English: House of the Teacher), Berlin-Mitte

== Works ==
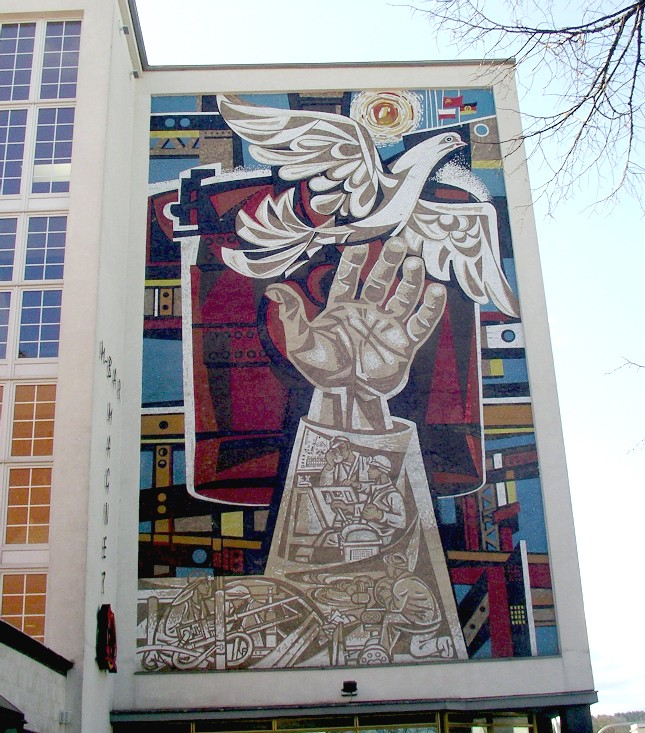
Mosaic in Eisenhüttenstadt, Germany

- Am Strand. 1962, oil on canvas.
- Wenn Kommunisten träumen. 1976, Palace of the Republic, Berlin
- Erika Steinführer. oil on canvas, 1981 for the trade union federation FDGB (today Ludwig gallery lock Oberhausen)

=== Architecture-related mural work ===
- 1958, Eisenhüttenstadt, natural stone mosaic in the town hall
- 1959, Bad Elster, stained glass window in the drinking hall of the Marienquelle
- 1960–1961, Oranienburg, three stained glass windows in the entrance hall to the Memorial and Museum Sachsenhausen
- 1962, Berlin-Mitte, three stained glass windows in the staircase of the main building of Humboldt University of Berlin
- 1963–1964, Berlin-Mitte, glass windows in the building of the former State Council of the GDR
- 1964, Berlin-Mitte, natural stone mosaic at the Haus des Lehrers (English: House of the Teacher), Education Department)
- 1966–1967, Bern, Ceramic wall in the entrance hall in the Central Office for international railway traffic (OCTI)
- 1968, Berlin-Mitte, mural enamel on copper, "Man, the Measure of All Things"; at the former Ministry of Construction of the GDR, Breite Straße, now demolished and attached since autumn 2013 to a renovated prefabricated building on the Friedrichsgracht
- 1968–1970, Berlin-Mitte, Fountain of Friendship of Nations on the Alexanderplatz
- 1970, Magdeburg, Wandbild Sonne und Taubenon the Karl-Marx-Straße (dismantled and now privately owned)
- 1971, Berlin-Mitte, Der Mensch überwindet Zeit und Raum (English: Man Overcomes Time and Space), Berlin-Mitte, copper relief on the wall of the House of Travel (German: Haus des Reisens)
- 1973 Oberhof, Wall decoration enamel on copper on Hotel Rennsteig (2001 demolished)

== Awards ==
- 1957: Art Prize of the DSF 2. recognition award for the painting Rast bei der Ernte
- 1959: Art Prize of the DDR for the painting Rast bei der Ernte
- 1960: Art Prize of the FDGB for the painting Junge Genossenschaftsbäuerin
- 1962: National Prize of the DDR III. Class
- 1963: Johannes-R.-Becher-Medaille
- 1965: Vaterländischer Verdienstorden in Gold (Patriotic Order of Merit in gold)
- 1966: Erich-Weinert-Medaille
- 1968: National Prize of the DDR II. Class for his artistic work
- 1975: Art Prize of the FDGB
- 1976: Banner der Arbeit in Gold (Banner of work in gold)
- 1982: Hans-Grundig-Medaille
- 1985: National Prize of the DDR I. Class
- 2009: Menschenrechtspreis der Gesellschaft zum Schutz von Bürgerrecht und Menschenwürde (Human Rights Award of the Society for the Protection of Civil Rights and Human Dignity)

== See also ==
- Socialist Realism
- Gemmail
- German art
