= Alexa Centre =

Shopping mall in Berlin, Germany

- Alexa Einkaufszentrum
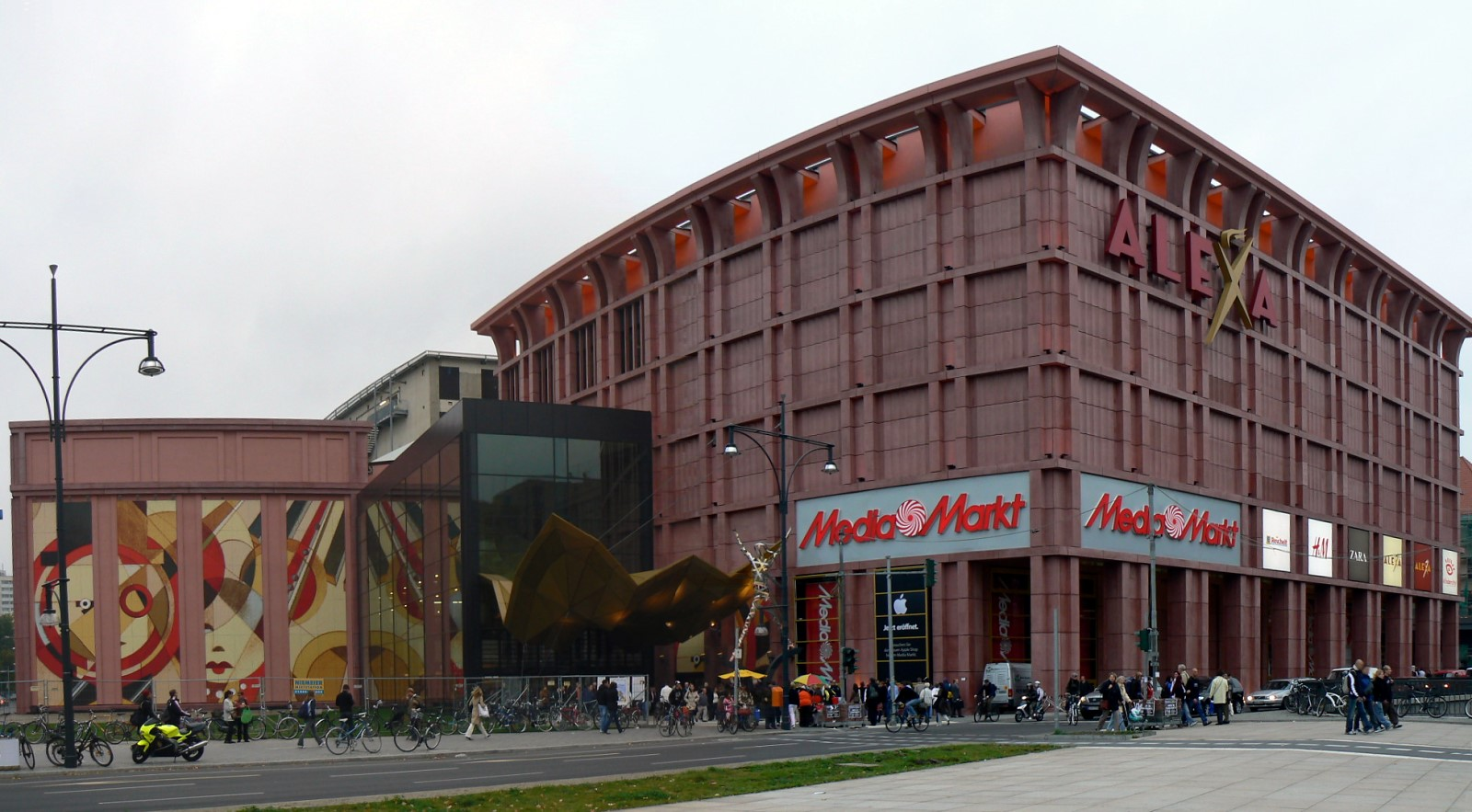
- The centre's exterior, 2007
- Location: Berlin
- Coordinates: 52°31′09″N 13°24′56″E
- Website: alexacentre.com

Alexa Centre (Alexa Einkaufszentrum) or simply Alexa, is a shopping centre near Alexanderplatz in Berlin, Germany. With a rental area of 56,200 m^{2} (605,000 sq ft), it was the second-largest shopping centre in Berlin at the time of its opening, after Gropius Passagen, but Alexa was the largest in terms of number of shops (180 vs. 151). Over one million people visit the Alexa Centre per month (for example, there was an average of 1.1 million visitors during the first quarter of 2009).

== See also ==
- List of shopping malls in Germany
