= Hermann Wilhelm Albert Blankenstein =

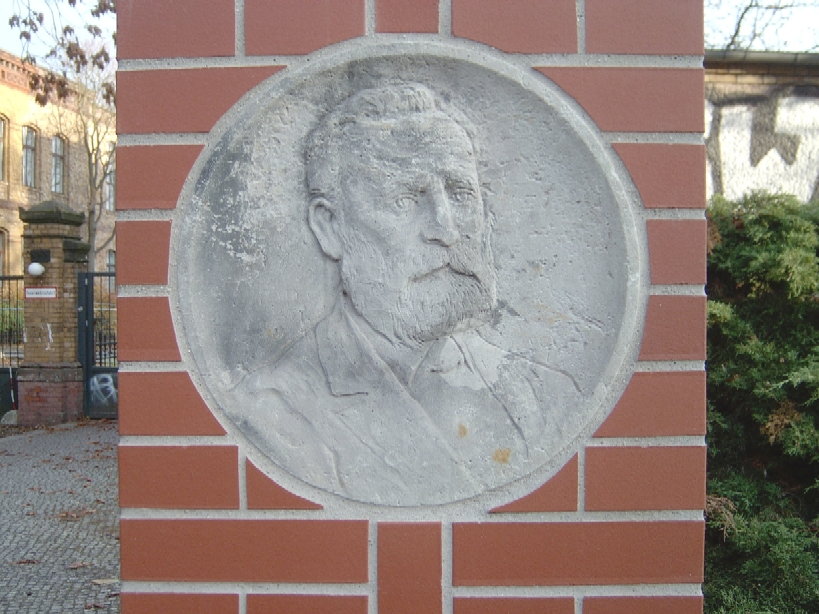
Statue of Blankenstein at Bezirksamt Prenzlauer Berg

Hermann Wilhelm Albert Blankenstein (10 January 1829, in Grafenbrück – 6 March 1910, in Berlin) was a German architect. He held a 24-year tenure as city councilor for Berlin, during which time he planned the construction of all city buildings, including 120 school buildings.

== Career ==
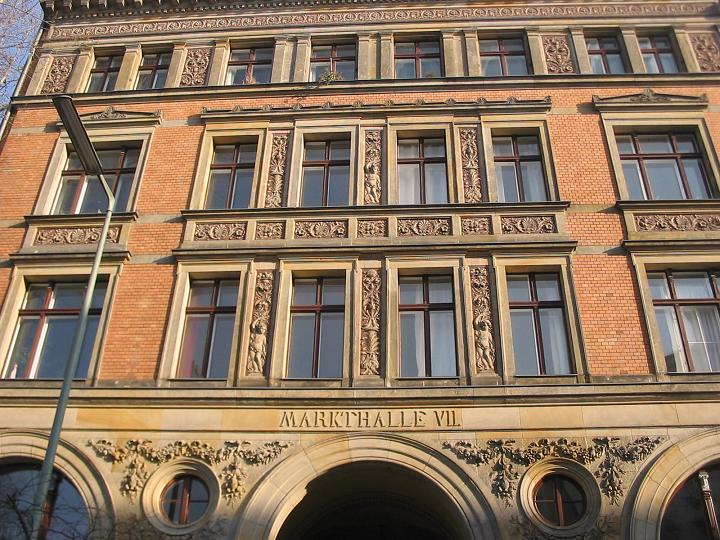
Markthalle VII by Blankenstein (1888)

Blankenstein was the son of a hydraulic engineering inspector. After serving in the military, he began studying at the Berlin Building Academy in 1849.

In 1851 he passed the exam as a construction supervisor. Between 1854 and 1856, he continued his studies at the building academy, receiving a master's degree. He then first worked on the Berlin Military Construction Commission and was then transferred to Szczecin as a government architect.

In 1863 he was transferred to Stargard in Pomerania. In 1865, on the recommendation of Friedrich Adler, he returned to the Ministerial Building Commission in Berlin. Between 1866 and 1872 he taught part-time at the Bauakademie.

== Markthalle Neun ==
In October 2011, the historic market hall was reopened in Kreuzberg's Eisenbahnstraße, 120 years after it was opened exclusively for traditional weekly markets. It now hosts themed Sunday markets and the weekly "Street Food Thursday".

== See also ==
- Friedrich Adler (architect)
