= Edmund Collein =

East German architect and urban planner

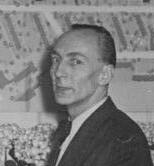
- Edmund Collein, 1952
- Born: 10 January 1906; Bad Kreuznach, Germany
- Died: 21 January 1992 (aged 86); Berlin, Germany
- Education: Technische Hochschule, Darmstadt (1921-1925); Bauhaus (1927-1930)
- Occupations: Architect, urban planner
- Spouse: Lotte Gerson (m. 23 February 1931)

Edmund Collein (10 January 1906 – 21 January 1992) was an East German architect and urban planner. He is also known for his photography while studying at the Bauhaus art school.

As a functionary of the SED, the ruling political party of East Germany, Collein was an important figure in forming and implementing the government's new socialist building policies in the 1950s and 1960s. He was professor of Urban Planning at the Bauakademie der DDR (Building Academy of the GDR), and he was the academy's inaugural vice-president. He was the president of the Bund der Architekten der DDR (Federation of Architects of the GDR) between 1966 and 1975, and he represented East German architects on government bodies and at the International Union of Architects.

Collein was one of the authors of The Sixteen Principles of Urban Design (German: Die Sechzehn Grundsätze des Städtebaus), which from 1950 until 1955 was the primary model for urban planning in the GDR.

== Early life and education ==
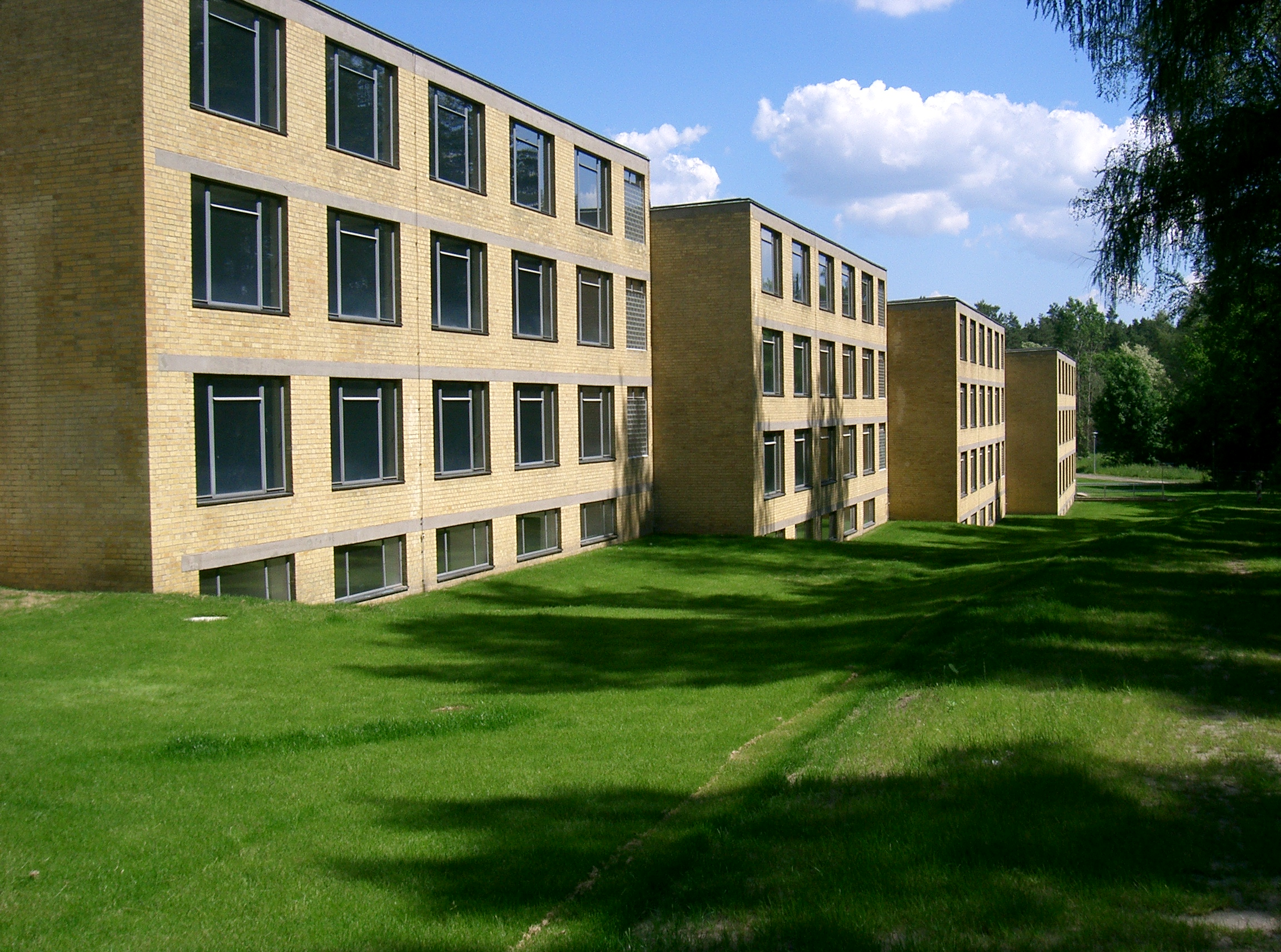
ADGB Trade Union School, built 1928-1930

Edmund Collein was born on 10 January 1906 in Bad Kreuznach, a spa town in the Rhineland. He studied at the Technische Hochschule in Darmstadt, now the Technische Universität Darmstadt, from 1925 to 1927.

He was a student at the Bauhaus in Dessau from 1927 to 1930. He undertook the preliminary course run by László Moholy-Nagy, studied in the carpentry workshop under Marcel Breuer and Josef Albers, and took classes by Paul Klee, Wassily Kandinsky and Joost Schmidt. From the winter of 1928-29 until 1930 he studied under Hannes Meyer in the building department. As a student he worked on the ADGB Trade Union School project in Bernau bei Berlin, which is now part of the Bauhaus World Heritage Site.

Although he published no photographs after leaving the Bauhaus, some of the works he made as a student are considered to be iconic Bauhaus images, notably Bauatelier Gropius, taken in 1927-28. The photo depicts students sitting in a two-level wooden cubby-hole structure. It is held by the J. Paul Getty Museum in Los Angeles, along with some of his other works.

In February 1931, he married the photographer and architect Lotte Gerson, who had also studied at the Bauhaus.

== Work ==
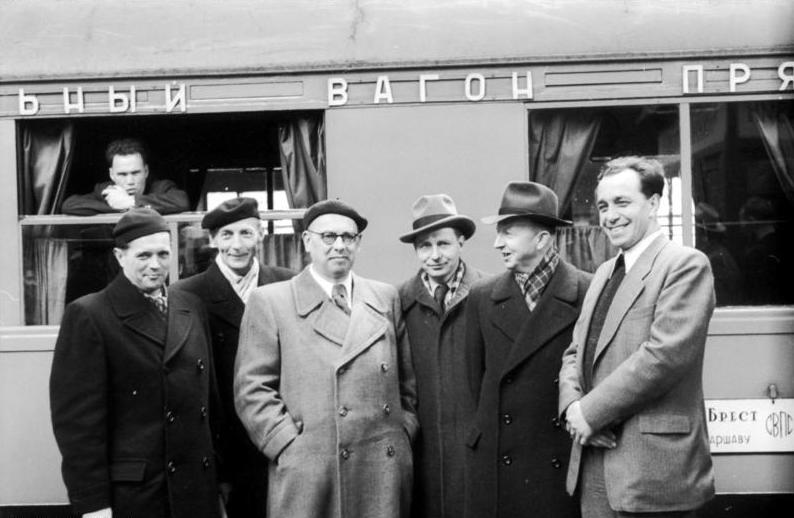
Departure of East German planners to Moscow. Berlin, 12 April 1950. L to R: Kurt Walter Leucht, Edmund Collein, Lothar Bolz, Waldemar Alder, Walter Piesternick, Kurt Liebknecht

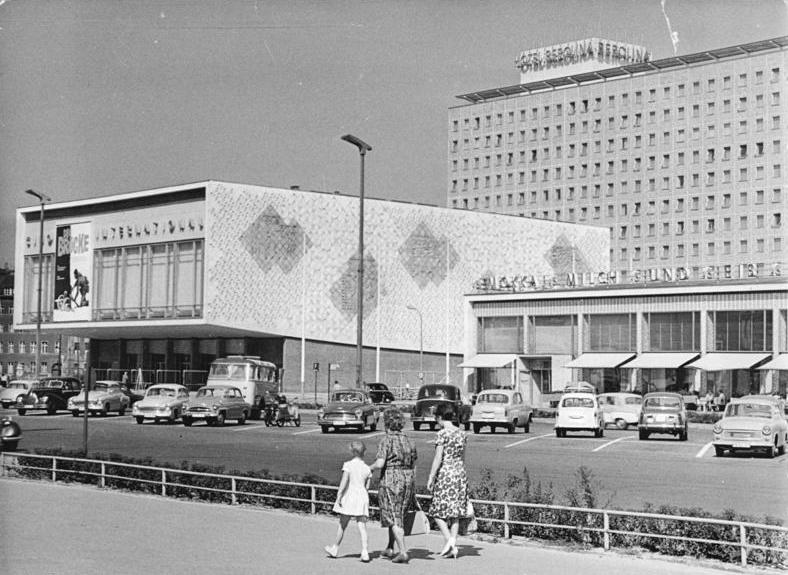
Karl-Marx-Allee, 1964 - Kino International and Mokka-Milch-Eisbar, with Hotel Berolina in the background

From 1930, Collein worked in Vienna, building apartments for workers' housing associations, and from 1938 he was employed building hospitals in Munich and Berlin.

During World War II, between 1940 and 1945 Collein served in the Wehrmacht, and was taken as a prisoner of war by the Soviet Union. When he was released in 1945 he returned to Berlin. He worked for the buildings department of the East Berlin municipal authority until 1951 and became head of the city planning office.

In 1950, he took part in a six-week study tour of the Soviet Union as part of a delegation of senior East German architects and planners which included Waldemar Alder, who had also studied under Hannes Meyer at the Bauhaus. The purpose of the visit, from 12 April to 25 May 1950, was to study Soviet town planning methods in order to develop strategies for rebuilding post-war East Germany. The group was led by Lothar Bolz, the East German Minister of Construction. The delegates were Kurt Walter Leucht, from the Dresden urban planning office, Collein as head of the East Berlin city planning office, Walter Pisternik, head of department of the Ministry of Construction, Waldemar Alder from the Ministry of Industry and Kurt Liebknecht, the director of urban planning and building at the Ministry of Construction. They went to Moscow, Kiev, Leningrad and Stalingrad.

The tour resulted in a document called The Sixteen Principles of Urban Design (German: Die Sechzehn Grundsätze des Städtebaus), which was written on 28 April 1950 in the Soviet Union. It was strongly influenced by Soviet planners, who had criticised East Germany's previous general reconstruction plan. From 1950 to 1955 the Sixteen Principles of Urban Design served as the main model for urban planning in East Germany.

In January 1951 Collein became professor for Urban Planning and vice-president of the newly created Bauakademie der DDR (Building Academy of the GDR) and the academy's inaugural vice-president. The organisation was initially called the Deutsche Bauakademie. The academy was a government agency that operated as the central research institution for architecture and construction in East Germany.

Together with Josef Kaiser and Werner Dutschke, Collein was involved in the second phase of construction of Karl-Marx-Allee (1959–1965), on the section between Strausberger Platz and Alexanderplatz. In contrast to the first phase of construction of the Allee, dominated by elaborate Socialist Classicist buildings, the second phase included a mixture of Plattenbau, retail stores, restaurants, and cultural facilities, like the Café Moskau, the Mokka-Milch-Eisbar and the Kino International. The street was originally called Große Frankfurter Straße, and between 1949 and 1961 it was Stalinallee. It was a flagship building project of East Germany's post-World War II reconstruction programme. Shortly before German reunification on 3 October 1990, the East German government had the whole of Karl Marx Allee listed as a protected monument.

In 1958, Collein became head of the Institute for District, Town and Village Planning at the Bauakademie der DDR. Between 1963 and 1971 he was chairman of the Academy's Economic Council. In 1966 he succeeded Hanns Hopp as president of the Bund der Architekten der DDR (Federation of Architects of the GDR), and held the post until 1975. He was also Chairman of the Advisory Council for Construction for the Council of Ministers of East Germany from 1955 to 1958. From 1973 to 1978 he represented the Bund der Architekten der DDR at the International Union of Architects.

== Awards ==
- Patriotic Order of Merit, Silver (1956); Gold (1970)
- National Prize of East Germany, second class (1962)
- Order of Karl Marx (1975)

== See also ==
- Konrad Püschel
