= Kino International =

Film theater in Berlin

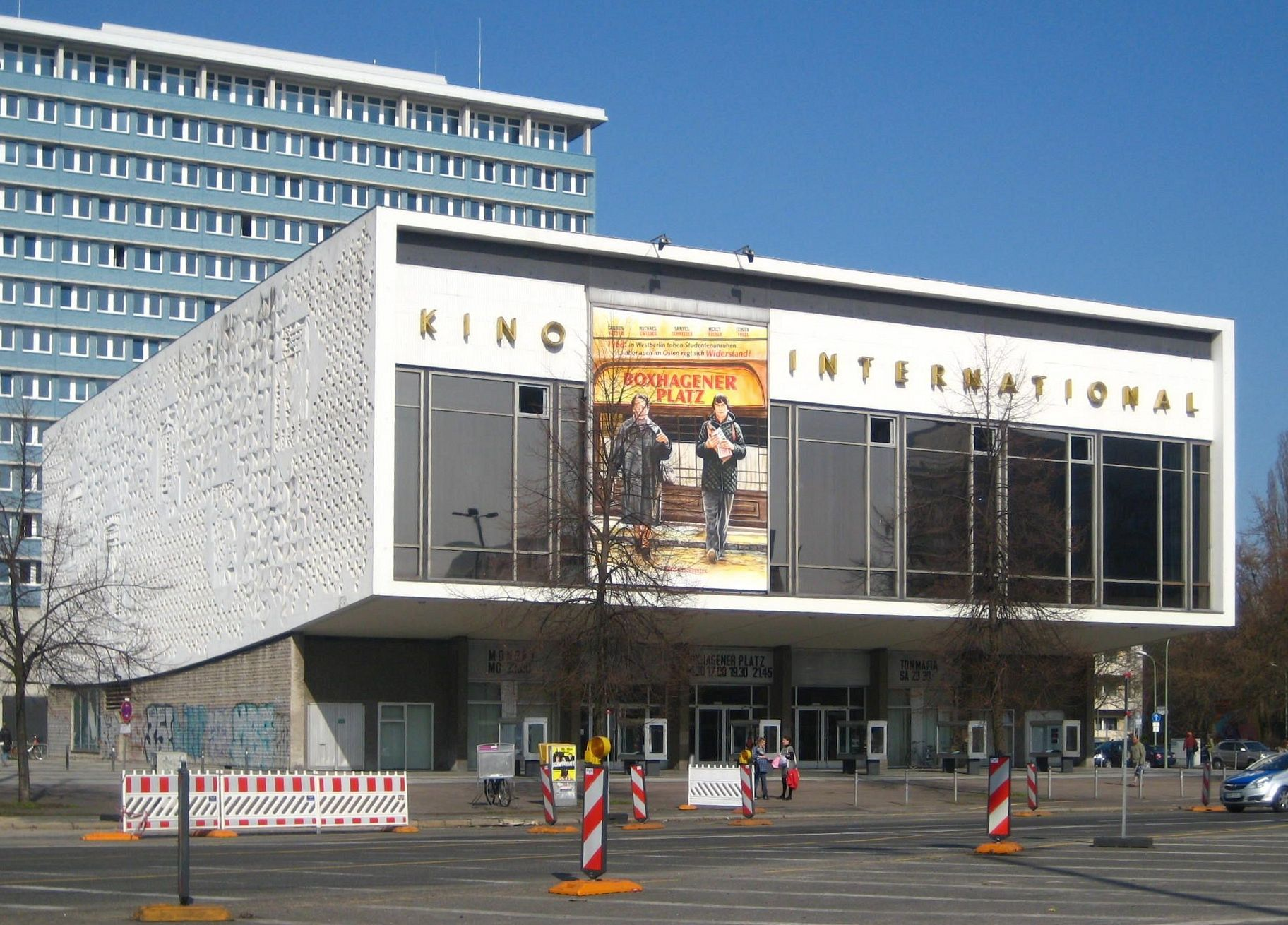
- Interactive map of Kino International
- Location: Karl-Marx-Allee 33; Berlin, Germany
- Coordinates: 52°31′14″N 13°25′22″E
- Owner: Yorck Kinogruppe
- Capacity: 555
- Type: Film theater

Construction
- Built: 1961–63
- Opened: 15 November 1963
- Renovated: 1990

Website
- www.yorck.de/kinos/kino-international

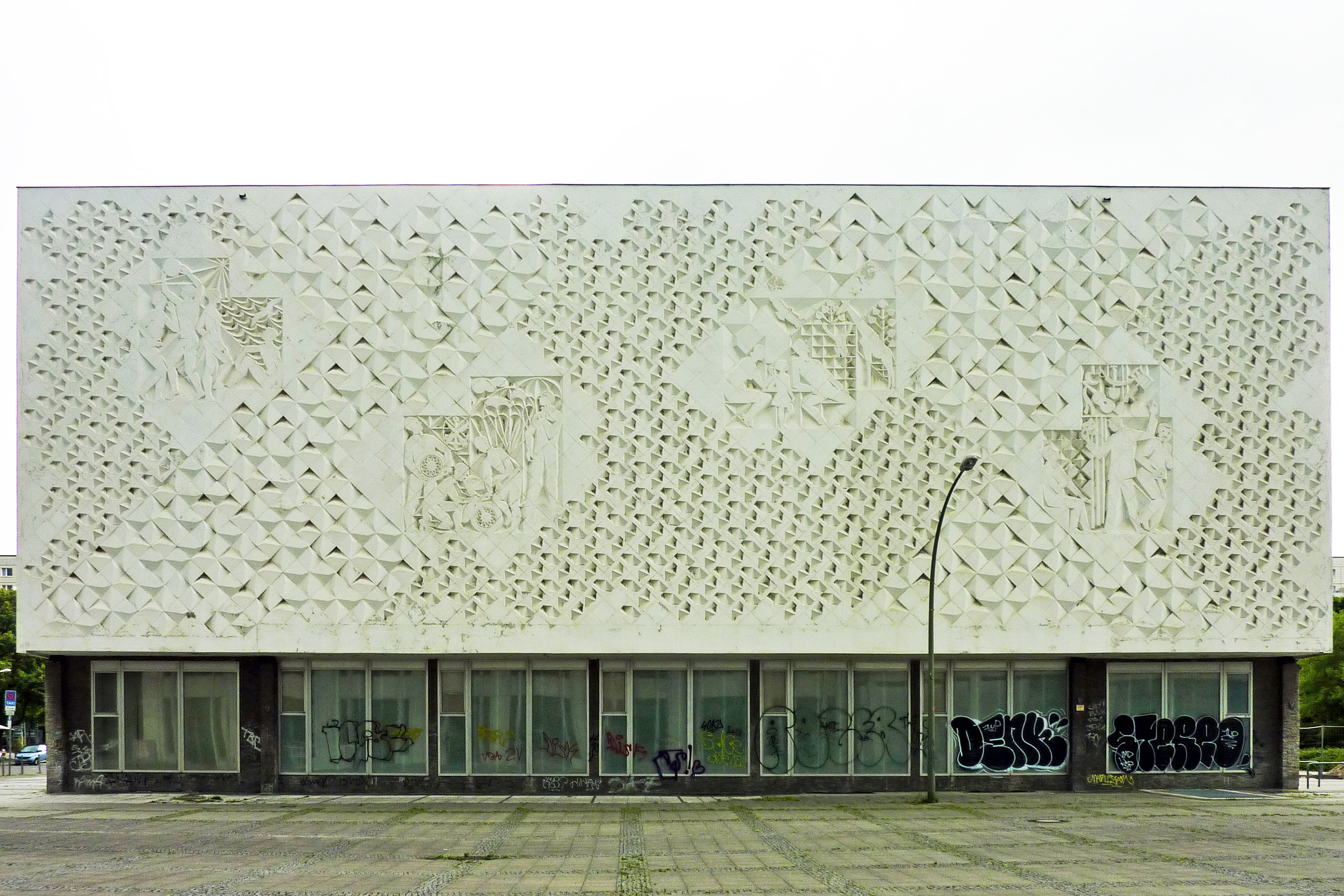
North facade

The Kino International is a film theater in Berlin, built from 1961 to 1963. It is located on Karl-Marx-Allee in former East Berlin. It hosted premieres of the DEFA film studios until the fall of the Berlin Wall in 1989. Today it is a protected historic building and one of the venues of the annual Berlin International Film Festival (Berlinale).

== Karl-Marx-Allee construction ==
After the completion of Karl-Marx-Allee from Strausberger Platz to Proskauer Straße, the next phase (1959–1965) was to extend the street to Alexanderplatz. After the plans of Hermann Henselmann were rejected, a competition was held in which seven architectural firms participated. In contrast to the first phase of construction of the Allee, dominated by the construction of elaborate Socialist Classicist buildings, the second phase included a mixture of Plattenbau, retail stores, restaurants, and cultural facilities according to plans of Edmund Collein, Werner Dutschke, and Josef Kaiser. These included the Café Moskau, the Mokka-Milch-Eisbar, the Hotel Berolina and the Kino International.

== Architecture ==
The theater was designed by Josef Kaiser in 1958, being the winning design in a competition, while Heinz Aust was appointed as the architect managing the construction. It comprises a three-story reinforced concrete frame construction with light sandstone façades. Kaiser had already designed the Kino Kosmos (also on Karl-Marx-Allee) and Café Moskau.

Due to the predefined boundaries of the bar area, the floor plans of each story vary: the ground floor is 38x35 m and the second floor is 47x35 m. A characteristic open space with glass surfaces faces the street, while the side façades feature 14 relief sculptures by Waldemar Grzimek, Hubert Schiefelbein, and Karl-Heinz Schamal.

In addition to the theater itself, other rooms included a library, an office of the Oktoberklub, and a "Representation Room" in which VIPs and SED party functionaries were entertained before and after film premieres.

After its two-year construction, the theater opened on 15 November 1963 with a grand opening premiere of the Soviet revolutionary drama Optimistic Tragedy.

== Cinema hall and technology ==
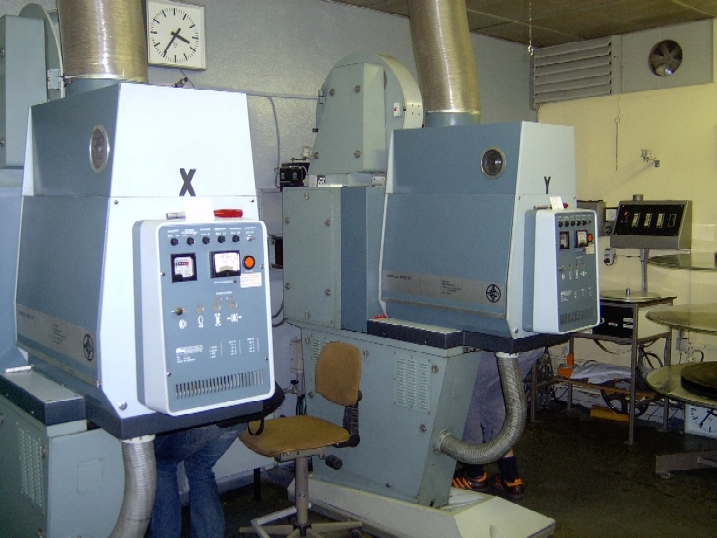
Projectors

The 1950s and 1960s saw many new buildings built in a special new kind of cinema architecture, including the Zoo Palast and the Royal Palast. This new style was meant to give the viewer optimal viewing and sound experiences. This was also considered during the planning of Kino International. The cinema, originally designed to hold around an audience of 600, is inclined. The acoustic technology was developed especially for the theater and is similar to that of a recording studio. Walls are covered with acoustic dampening panels and the wall coverings, made of offset wood panels with open joints guaranteed an acoustic experience that was unique at that time. The waved ceiling also optimally reflects sounds to the seating area.

In the 1980s, Kino International was one of the first cinemas in the GDR equipped with Dolby Stereo.

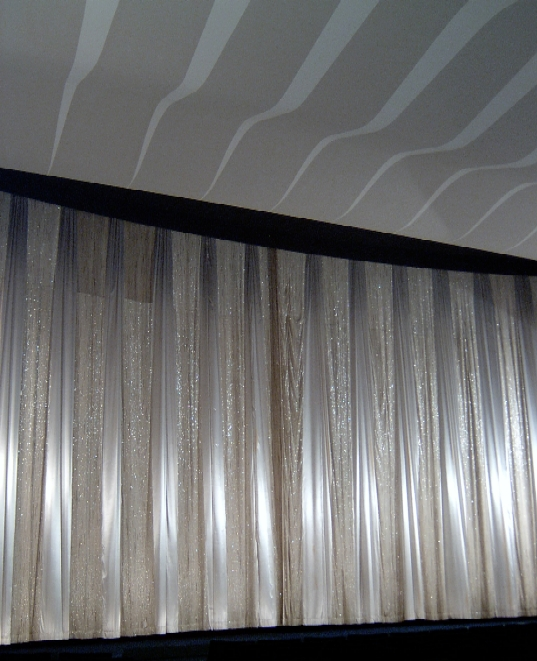
Curtains (2006)

== Film premieres ==
Until 1989, Kino International was the main theater for premieres in the GDR. Multiple films produced by DEFA, the state-owned film studio, held their premieres here.

There were eight rows of seats with optimal views and extra legroom, reserved for state officials and party functionaries. Before and after premieres, state visitors were entertained in the "Representation Room", today called the Honecker Lounge after Erich Honecker, the last leader of East Germany. In the basement, a small bunker and elevator were later added for the state leadership.

The Kino International's last premiere in the GDR was the gay-themed Coming Out, directed by Heiner Carow, on 9 November 1989, the day the Berlin Wall fell.

The cinema continues to show premieres.

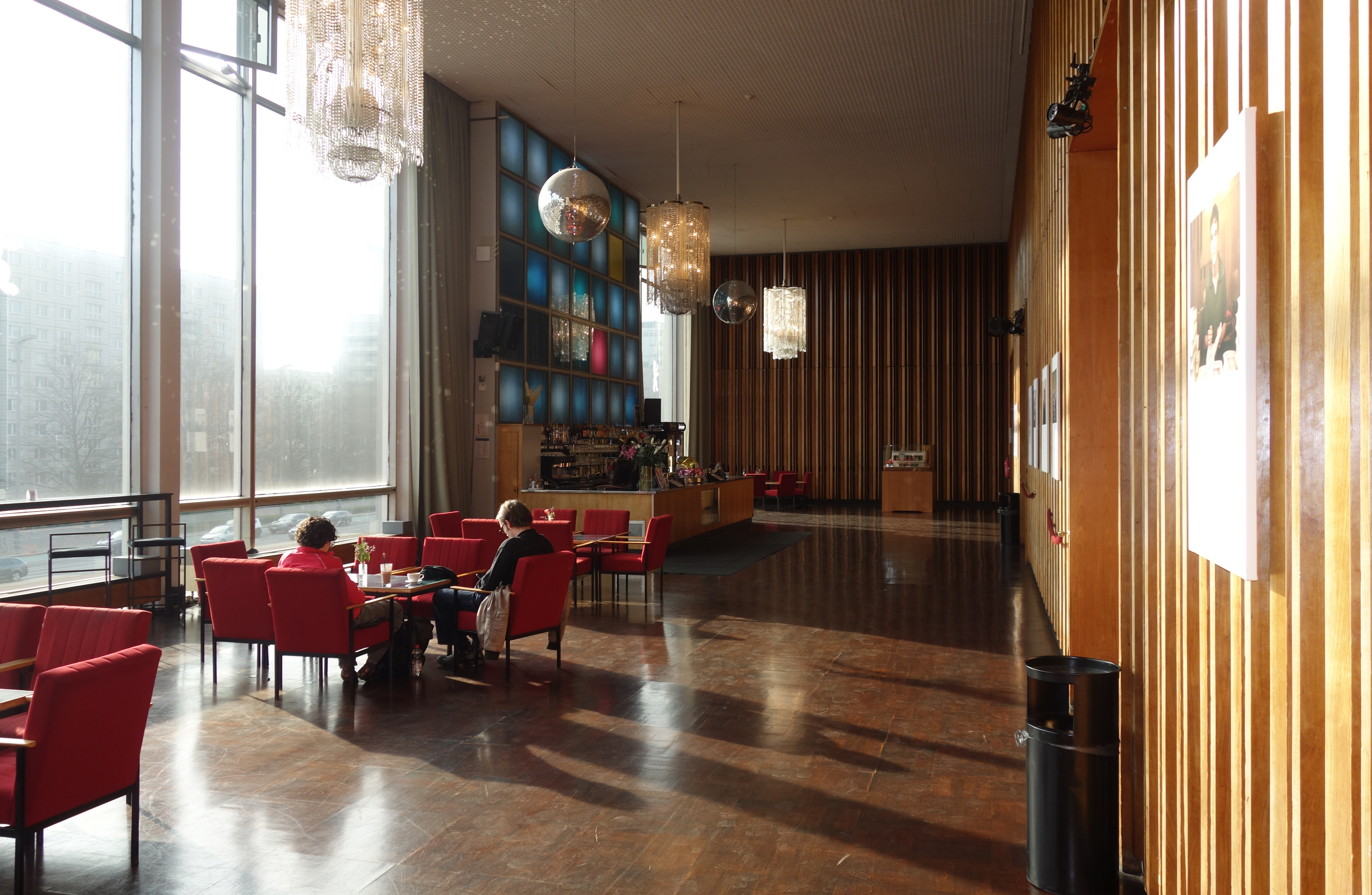
Bar area (2024)

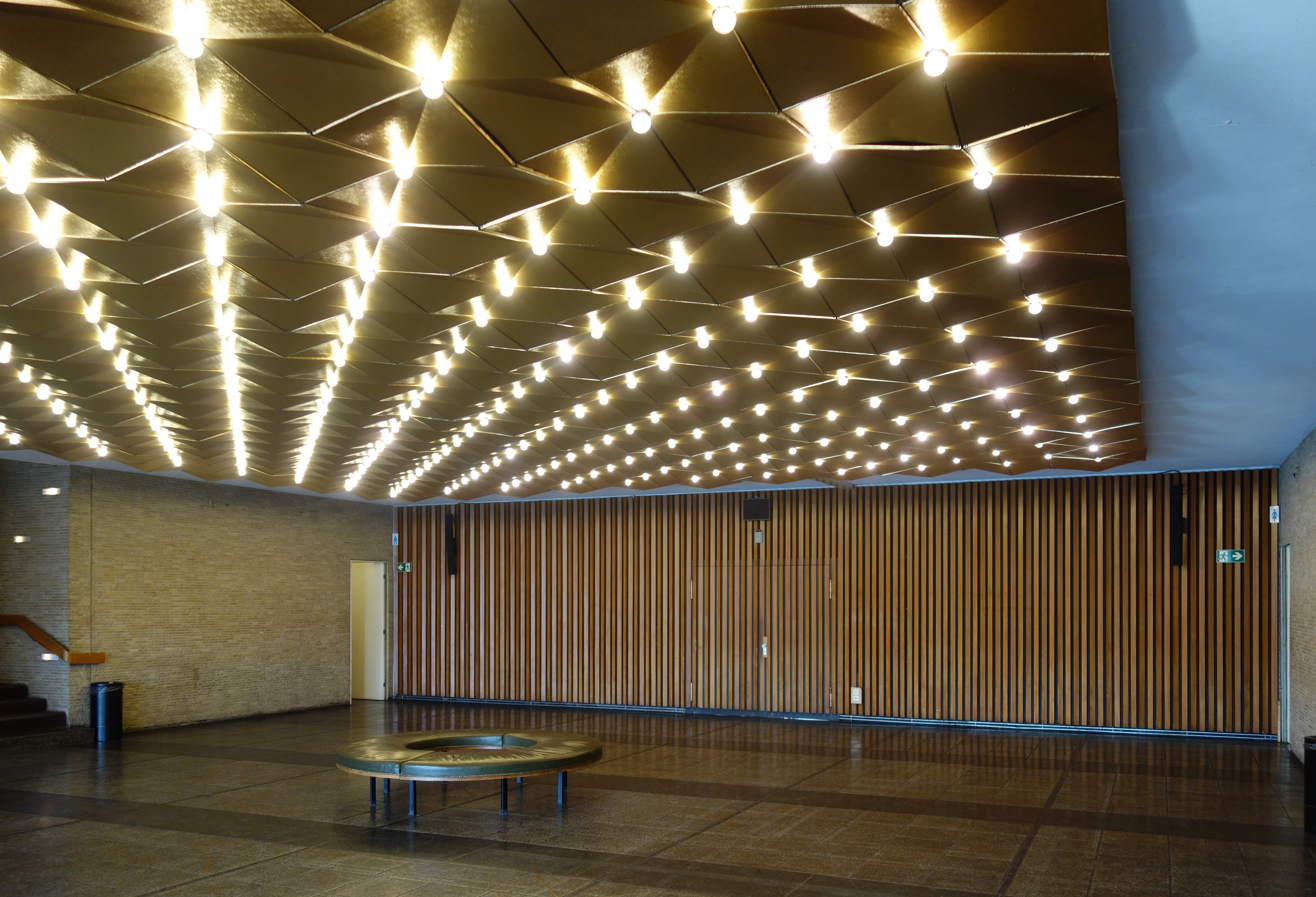
Foyer in the entrance area (2024)

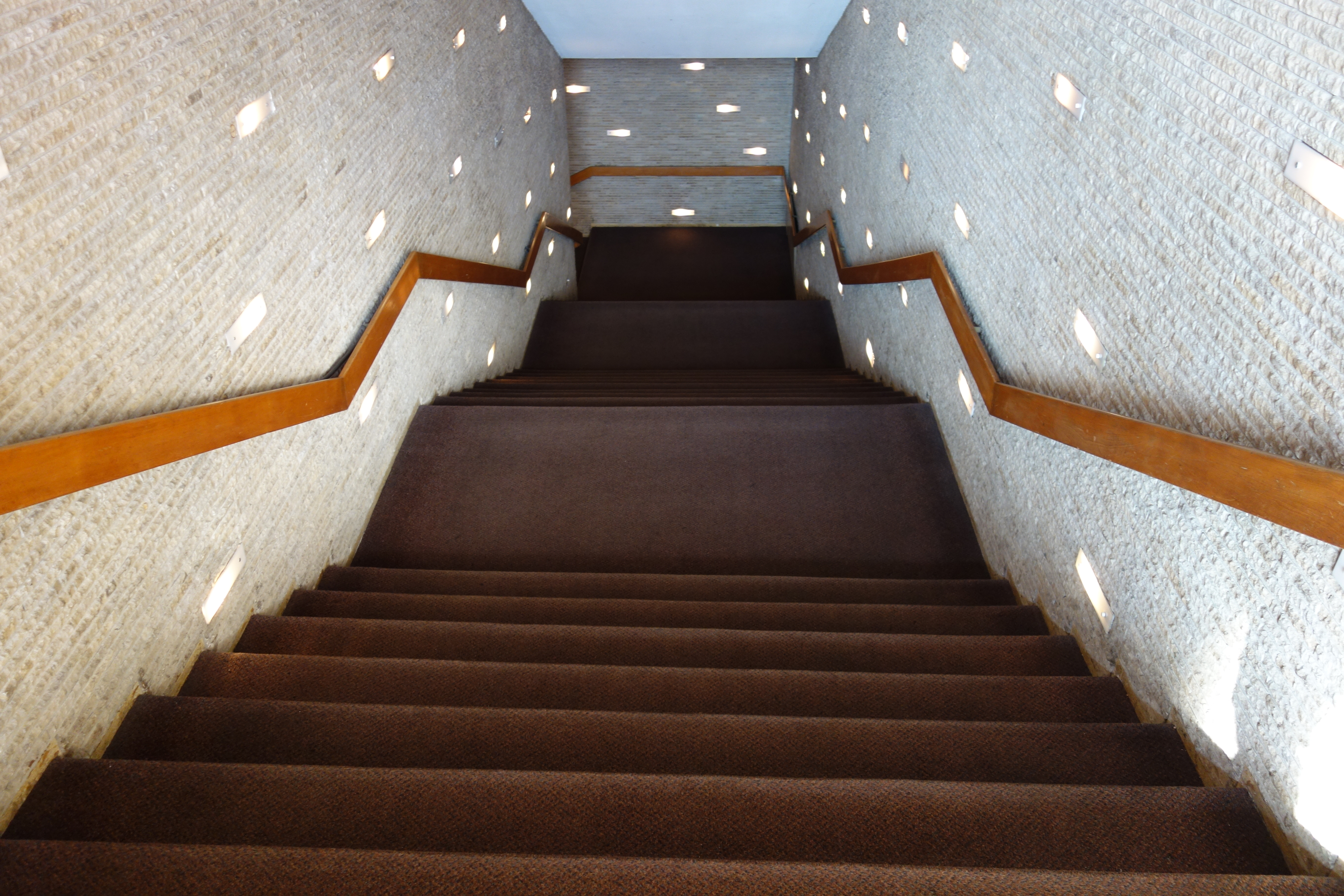
Stairs from the bar area to the entrance area (2024)

== Renovation and heritage protection ==
The building was renovated in 1990, and in the same year, a group of buildings which included Kino International were put under heritage protection.

== Current uses and temporary closure for renovation ==
Today, the Kino International is operated by Yorck Kinogruppe, and continues to be used by many filmmakers for premieres due to its ambience.The large film posters on the outside of the theater show the film of the week and are still painted by hand.

The cinema accommodates an audience of 555 people, having been originally built for 600. It is used as a venue of the Berlinale, Berlin's long-running international film festival.

Since May of 2024, Kino International has been closed for renovation scheduled to last two years. Reopening has been announced for late February 2026.
