= The Sixteen Principles of Urban Design =

Die Sechzehn Grundsätze des Städtebaus, or The Sixteen Principles of Urban Design, was from 1950 until 1955 the primary model for urban planning in the GDR.

One of the authors was Edmund Collein, a Bauhaus trained architect, who later became vice-president of the Bauakademie der DDR (Building Academy of the GDR) and president of the Bund der Architekten der DDR (Federation of Architects of the GDR).

== Text ==
Decided by the Government of the German Democratic Republic on 27 July 1950:

The urban planning and architectural design of our cities, which shall influence the construction of all of Germany, must express the social order of the German Democratic Republic, as well as the progressive traditions and great goals of our German people. They shall adhere to the following principles:

1. The city as a form of settlement did not arise by chance. The city is the richest economic and cultural form of community settlement, proven by centuries of experience. The city is in its structural and architectural design an expression of the political life and the national consciousness of the people.
2. The goal of urban planning is the harmonious fulfillments of man's basic rights to employment, housing, culture and recreation. The methodological principles of urban planning are based on the natural condition, on the social and economic foundations of the state, on the highest achievements of science, technology and art, on the needs of the economy, and on the use of progressive elements of the cultural heritage of the people.
3. Cities, per se, do not arise and do not exist. To a significant extent, cities are built by industry for industry. The growth of the city, the population, and the area are determined by city-forming factors, that is, from industry, governing bodies, and cultural sites, insofar as they have more than local significance. In the capital, industry as an urbanization factor is of secondary importance to administrative bodies and cultural sites. The precise discernment and codification of city-forming factors is a matter determined by government.
4. The growth of the city must be subordinate to efficacy and remain within certain limits. An overgrown city, its population, and its area lead to difficulties in eliminating tangles in their structure, lead to entanglements in the organization of cultural life and the daily care of the population, and lead to administrative complications, both in business and in the development of industry.
5. Urban planning must be based on the principles of organicism, and the consideration of a city's historical structure in eliminating that city's shortcomings.
6. The center forms the veritable core of the city. The center of the city is the political center for its population. In the city center are the most important political, administrative and cultural sites. On the squares in the city center one might find political demonstrations, marches and popular celebrations held on festival days. The center of the city shall be composed of the most important and monumental buildings, dominating the architectural composition of the city plan and determining the architectural silhouette of the city.
7. In cities that lie on a river, the river and its embankments shall be one of the main arteries and architectural axes of the city.
8. Traffic circulation has to serve the city and its population. It should neither divide the city nor be cumbersome to the general public. Through traffic should be removed from the center and central district and rerouted outside its borders or to an outer ring. Equipment for the carriage of goods, such as rail- and canal-ways, should also be kept away from the central district of the city. Determining locations for main roads must take into account the coherence and tranquility of residential districts. In determining the width of main roads, it is important to note that the width of these main thoroughfares is not of crucial importance to urban transportation, but rather as an outlet for crossroads in order to appropriately ease the demands of traffic flow.
9. The visage of the city-that is, its individual artistic form-shall be defined by squares, main streets, and prominent buildings in the center of the city (in those largest cities containing skyscrapers). Squares and plazas shall serve as the structural basis for the planning of the city and for its overall architectural composition.
10. Residential areas shall consist of housing districts, the cores of which shall be district centers. For the sake of the residents of these housing districts, in them shall be all necessary cultural, utility, and social services. The second aspect in the structuring of residential areas shall be the residential complex, which is formed by grouping together four housing structures, where there shall be located a central park, schools, kindergartens, and nurseries that serve the daily needs of the population. Urban transport must not be allowed within these residential areas, but neither the residential districts nor the residential complexes should be isolated entities in and of themselves. Latent in their structure and design are the demands of the city on a whole. The housing structures themselves function as a third aspect in the importance of complexes in planning and design.
11. Access to light and air are not the only determining factors for healthy and peaceful living conditions, but also population density and orientations, as well as the development of transportation systems.
12. It is impossible to transform a city into a garden. Of course, care must be taken to provide sufficient greenery, but the principle not to overturn is that in the city one lives urbanistically, whereas on the outskirts or outside the city one lives rurally.
13. The many storey high-rise is more economical than a one- or two-storey design. It also reflects the character of the metropolis.
14. Urban planning is the basis of architectural design. Central to urban planning and architectural design of a city is the creation of an individual and unique visage for that city. The architecture must embody both the progressive traditions as well as the past experiences of the people.
15. For urban planning, as for architectural design, there shall be no abstract scheme. Crucial are only the summarization of essential architectural factors and the demands of daily life.
16. Simultaneously and in accordance with the work on a city plan shall be completed designs for the planning and development of specific neighborhoods, as well as plazas and main street with neatly organized housing blocks, whose construction will be completed first.

== Implementation ==
By September 7, 1950, one day after the adoption of a national building law, the demolition of the heavily damaged Berlin City Palace began. The plan was to build a 90-meter wide stretch of road from the Frankfurter Straße via Alexanderplatz, Königstraße (now Rathausstraße) and the street Unter den Linden to the Brandenburg Gate. The "central axis" was to create a new representation Magistrale arise between the Brandenburg Gate and Alexanderplatz, the center of the monumental height dominant – should be in place of the castle, the central government building – as a "city crown" the Marx-Engels-Platz. In 1951, Stalinallee emerged as the first Socialist avenue in the GDR. The first stages of construction was from 1952 to 1958, designed by Hermann Henselmann, architect of Hochhaus an der Weberwiese. When the work at Frankfurter Tor was completed in 1960, the historicist style of the avenue was already outdated and perceived almost bashfully. Other major projects were in Dresden at the Altmarkt, in Leipzig on Roßplatz and at the Long Street realized in Rostock. From 1955 a new phase of urban development in the GDR took place after the Soviet Union adopted new directives for 1954 architecture, which called for greater standardization and the waiving of expensive ornamentation. The second phase of Stalinallee-between Strausberger Platz and Alexander Platz-was therefore built in an industrial aesthetic.

== See also ==
- Le Corbusier's Plan Voisin
- Congrès International d'Architecture Moderne and their Athens Charter
- Camillo Sitte

== Bibliography ==
- Bolz, Lothar (1951) Von deutschem Bauen. Reden und Aufsätze. Berlin (Ost): Verlag der Nation, pp. 32–52.
- Glabau, Leonie (2010) Plätze in einem geteilten Land: Stadtplatzgestaltungen in der Bundesrepublik Deutschland und der Deutschen Demokratischen Republik von 1945 bis 1990. Frankfurt: Verlag Peter Lang. ISBN 978-3-631-61202-6
