= Kurt Walter Leucht =

German architect and city planner

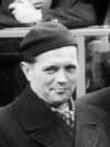
- Born: June 8, 1913; Ellefeld, Vogtland
- Died: September 4, 2001 (aged 88); Dresden
- Occupation(s): Architect and city planner
- Known for: Planning of Eisenhüttenstadt

Kurt Walter Leucht (8 June 1913, in Ellefeld, Vogtland – 4 September 2001 (Dresden)) was a German architect and city planner. He is mostly known for his design of the planned city Eisenhüttenstadt.

In 1952 Leucht was appointed Director of the Institute for Urban Development and Settlement which included work on Berlin's Stalinallee, Stalinstadt (known as Eisenhüttenstadt from 1961) and with Hartmut Colden, Joachim Nätherand and Konrad Braun, the planning of residential areas in Rostock.

In 1963 he became Head of Urban Development and worked on the planning for the city centres of Dresden, Suhl, Leipzig and Magdeburg.

Between 1966 and 1969 Leucht was the city architect in Dresden, and remained in Dresden where he died in 2001.
