= Hotel Berolina =

Hotel in Berlin, Germany

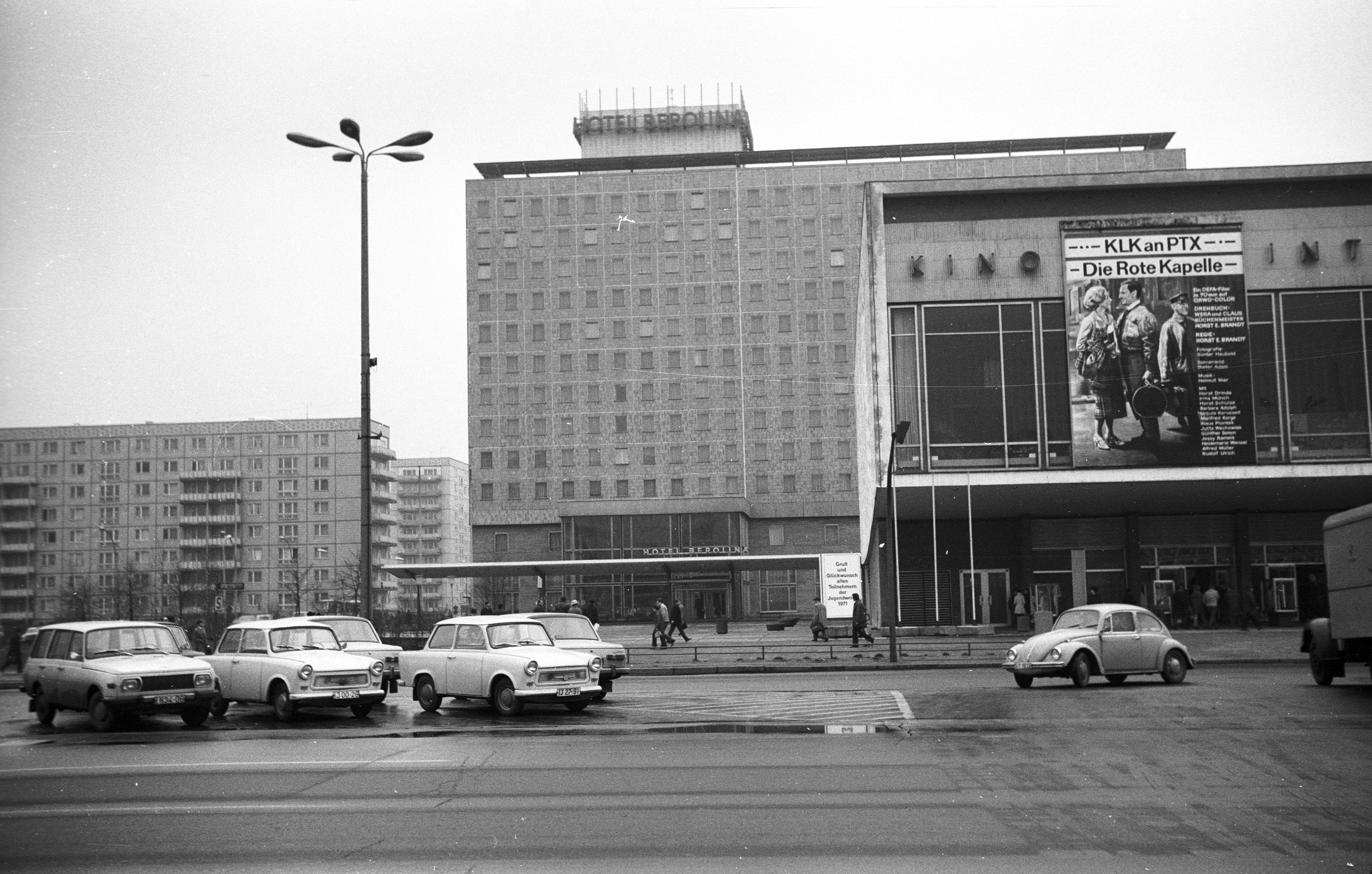

- Location in Berlin

General information
- Location: Karl-Marx Allee, Berlin, Germany
- Coordinates: 52°31′16″N 13°25′24″E
- Opening: 1963

Other information
- Number of rooms: 375

Hotel Berolina was a hotel in (East) Berlin, Germany which existed from 1963 to 1996. It was set back from the road behind the Kino International. It was designed by Josef Kaiser and Günter Kunert had 375 rooms, a restaurant with 200 seats, a specialty restaurant in the basement, a café on the top floor as well as corporate and conference rooms.
