= Kurt Liebknecht =

German architect (1905–1994)

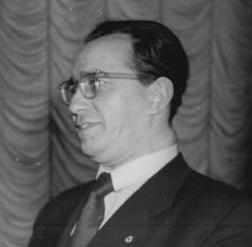
- Heinz Funck, 1954
- Born: Otto Wilhelm Curt Liebknecht; 26 March 1905; Frankfurt am Main, Germany
- Died: 6 January 1994 (aged 88); Berlin, Germany
- Education: Wöhler-Realgymnasium (Frankfurt a/M.); Technische Universität Berlin
- Occupations: Architect; University administrator Politician
- Spouse(s): 1. ____; 2. Lydia; 3. Gisela
- Children: (at least 3)

Kurt Liebknecht (sometimes Curt Liebknecht: 26 March 1905 – 6 January 1994) was a German architect. After 1937 he pursued his career as a Soviet architect, except during a hiatus of eighteen months spent in a Soviet jail as a suspected spy.

Returning to Germany at the end of 1948, after the launch of the German Democratic Republic (East Germany) in 1949 he became an important and influential member of the new country's artistic establishment during the 1950s and 1960s, both through his teaching work at the Berlin-based Bauakademie (college of building and architecture) and on account of his activities as an engaged member of the party. Between 1954 and 1963 he was a member of the powerful Party Central Committee, which under the highly centralised Leninist power structure in force in East Germany was the fulcrum of political power.

Liebknecht's approach was influenced, over time, by contrasting currents in modern architecture, which taken together can be seen as remarkably ambivalent. During his early years he was powerfully influenced by the work of great twentieth century pioneers of modern architecture and urban planning, such as Ludwig Mies van der Rohe, Hans Poelzig and Ernst May. Till the early 1930s he was close to he New Objectivity and Neue Bauen movements, or in Soviet terms Constructivism. As the Stalin era unfolded and his career progressed in the Soviet Union his work was increasingly defined by "Socialist classicism", the architectural expression of Socialist realism That is the style he brought back to East Germany in 1948. This aligned with the political currents of the time, and it became remarkably ubiquitous in the postwar reconstruction architecture of the 1950s.

== Biography ==
=== Family provenance and early years ===
(Otto Wilhelm) Curt Liebknecht was born in Frankfurt am Main where Otto Liebknecht (1876–1949), his father, who had shunned the family tradition of political activism, worked with what became Degussa as an increasingly senior industrial chemist. Otto Liebknecht (the father) has been identified in one source as "one of the pioneers of Persil ("Perborat-Silikat") washing powder". His mother, born Elsa Ernestine Friedland, was a pianist who had trained at the Berlin Conservatory: she came from a musical Jewish family. However, it was Kurt Liebknecht's uncle, Karl Liebknecht, as one of the murdered founders of the Communist Party in postwar Germany, who left a larger footprint in the mainstream historical record than either of his parents. Another of his father's brothers, Theodor Liebknecht, was also prominent in left-wing politics during and directly after the First World War.

Liebknecht completed his schooling at the Wöhler-Realgymnasium (secondary school), passing his Abitur exam early in 1924, which opened the way to a university-level education. First, however, he worked for around six months as a building worker and carpenter. Later during 1924 he relocated to Berlin where between 1924 and 1929 he studied architecture at the Technische Hochschule in Berlin-Charlottenburg (now Technische Universität Berlin). His course provided for a period of practical study in 1927, during which he worked for the highly regarded architect Ludwig Mies van der Rohe. In 1928 he won first prize in a student competition with his proposal for a public building in Malchin (near Rostock). The next year he emerged with a "Diplom-Ingenieur" degree in architecture. Between 1929 and 1931 he was employed by the Hans Poelzig firm. One of his projects during his time as part of "Team Poelzig" was for the interior fitting out of Berlin's prestigious new Haus des Rundfunks (Broadcasting House). This was followed a period working as a "Regierungsbauführer" (government buildings manager) working for the Free State of Prussia, after which he passed the government exams necessary to move up a notch, to the level of a "Regierungsbaumeister". In that position he headed up the construction of the "University Women's Clinic" ("Universitäts-Frauenklinik") in Berlin. Further work that he undertook between 1929 and the middle part of 1931, alongside involvement in city planning projects, tended to focus on the health care sector, especially on functional buildings, principally hospitals.

=== Soviet Union ===
In August 1931 Liebknecht, finding himself unemployed with a heavily pregnant wife, relocated to the Soviet Union. The backwash from the Wall Street crash in October 1929 had been reflected in a cut back in new building in Germany, and it was possible to anticipate more and better opportunities for architects in Moscow than in Berlin. He returned for visits to Berlin in 1932 and to Hamburg in 1933. However, the dramatic change of government in January 1933 meant that the creation of a hostile environment for Jews became a defining underpinning of government strategy in Germany. Kurt Liebknecht was the son of a Jewish mother which meant that in the eyes of the authorities he was a "half-Jew". It would also have counted against him that he came from one of Germany's most famous socialist dynasties. Between 1933 and 1948 Kurt Liebknecht stayed out of Nazi Germany. His continuing professional success did not go unnoticed in Berlin, and after war between Europe's principal dictatorships erupted in 1941, Kurt Liebknecht's name appeared on the Gestapo "manhunt targets lists" ("Sonderfahndungsliste") of government opponents to be sought out and rounded up following a successful German invasion of the Soviet Union.

In the Soviet Union Liebknecht was entrusted, over the years, with senior positions in respect of various government construction projects. Initially, during 1931/32, he worked for an international team around the city planner Ernst May. May had been heavily influenced by what is known in England as the Garden city movement, and in 1930 he had moved with virtually his entire "New Frankfurt" team from Frankfurt am Main to Moscow in order to support the Soviet Union's urban modernisation programme under the direction of powerful "building policy" committees of the ruling Communist Party. Liebknecht was assigned to the so-called "Second May Group" under the leadership of another expatriate German architect, Werner Hebebrand: construction activity was focused on Moscow. Within the "Second May Group" Liebknecht was placed in charge of the "Hospitals Building Sub-group". Alongside these assignments he teamed up with his Dutch colleague Marinus Gewin to enter a submission for an international competition held in 1931 involving plans (much touted but never implemented) for a Palace of the Soviets on the site of the demolished Cathedral of Christ the Saviour near the Moscow Kremlin. By 1932, with some of the initial impetus from Ernst May's group projects, beginning to fade, Liebknecht switched to the "People's Commissariat for Health's Commission for Project Standards" ("Kommission für Projektierungsnormative des Volkskommissariats für Gesundheitswesen "). Then, starting in 1933, he worked for the "People's Commissariat for Transport and Communications" (" Volkskommissariat für Verkehrswesen und Verbindungswesen"), where he was responsible for the planning of clinics, along with residential and office developments in several important cities and towns, including Magnitogorsk and Stalinsk (as Novokuznetsk was known till 1961). He was provided with a comfortable three room apartment just a few hundred meters from his Moscow office.

Identified as a "deserving co-worker in the building of socialism in the Soviet Union", Kurt Liebknecht was given Soviet citizenship in 1937. He moved into a small single floor house of the type normally provided to rail workers. However, the next year he was caught up in the Stalinist Clean-up ("Большая чистка") – identified sometimes in western sources as the Great Terror. As part of the "Operation to take repressive measures against German national who are suspected of espionage against the Soviet Union" (NKVD Order Number 00439). For two days, as he later testified under questioning, he was left naked in an empty cell without even a board on which to lie, after which an unconscious man was placed in the cell with him, followed by many more mangled individuals. In three interrogation session during June 1938 he sought to place the blame on others. Then, under torture, he accepted that he had become a spy. He remained in detention for more than a year.

By 1939 many of the Germans who had fled to Moscow as refugees for reasons of race and/or political activism after 1933 had not survived the Stalinist purges. Kurt Liebknecht did survive. Sources speculate that his cousin Wilhelm Liebknecht, the son of his Uncle Karl, intervened on his behalf. Wilhelm Liebknecht, a lawyer like his father, had lived in Moscow since 1928, intervened with the authorities on behalf of a number of family members during the later 1930s and beyond, until he himself fell under suspicion and after 1941 was banished, with his family, to Uzbekistan. Kurt Liebknecht was one of relatively few Germans in the Soviet Union to be fully rehabilitated in the aftermath of the purges, though he lived with the awareness that he was being constantly monitored and his luck might turn again. During the rest of his time in the Soviet Union he took care never to speak German for fear of raising suspicion.

As part of his rehabilitation, at the end of 1939 Liebknecht took charge of the "Department of Health and Social Matters" at the "All Unions Academiy for Architecture" in Moscow. After the German invasion, which began in June 1941, he was mandated to work in collaboration with the Red army on plans for underground medical facilities. As the German army advanced towards Moscow it became more important than ever that he always presented himself as a "loyal Soviet citizen". His architectural designs came with ever more "Russian national flourishes" As the Germans came closer the entire "All Unions Academy" – including all its workers – was evactuated to Shymkent (Шымкент), an industrial city (with a rich cultural heritage) in Kazakhstan. After the focus of the fighting turned, with disastrous results for the invaders, to Stalingrad, in 1943 Liebknecht was able to return to the Architecture Academy in Moscow.

With the future defeat of Nazi Germany clearly on the horizon, in 1944 Kurt Liebknecht met with Wilhelm Pieck in Moscow in 1944. Pieck was the respected leader of the exiled German Communist Party and a senior representative of the Communist dominated National Committee for a Free Germany. Liebknecht was keen do discuss how he might contribute to the reconstruction of postwar Germany. It can have done no damage to his future prospects that Liebknecht, while they were both still in Moscow, had written to and sought out the man who later became the president of the German Democratic Republic (East Germany): nevertheless, for two or three years following the war (which in Europe ended, formally, in May 1945) Liebknecht remained in Moscow, receiving a doctorate in June 1945 with a dissertation on hospital construction in Soviet Central Asia.

In 1946 Kurt Liebknecht made his first visit back to Germany since 1933. Unlike most Germans returning from the Soviet Union he arrived by air. He left his Ukrainian-born first wife and his son behind in Moscow. By the time he returned to settle permanently in East Berlin he was accompanied by Lydia, his second wife, and their two small children. During 1946/47 he was a freelance worker at the Soviet Information Office and a specialist contributor on building matters in the German language section of Radio Moscow which involved several further working visits to East Berlin. He was much involved in negotiations for the establishment of an academy of building and architecture ("Bauakademie"), an academic institute that could define the theoretical principals for the massive reconstruction challenges ahead, and convert those principals into reality. During one of his visits, in July 1946, he himself was appointed deputy head of the newly opened Academy of Arts and humanities by the Soviet Military Administration that had been in charge of the Soviet occupation zone since the previous summer. He was also appointed secretary of the "Health facilities" department. Meanwhile, in the Soviet Union in 1947, he completed plans for a major health clinic in Stalingrad.

=== Soviet occupation zone ===
In 1948 Kurt Liebknecht settled in Berlin, at the heart of the Germany's Soviet occupation zone (although the city itself was divided into four separate military occupation zones, of which the Soviet zone, covering the eastern part of the city, was by far the largest). In the zone's destroyed cities the defining challenge involved adopting Soviet-Socialist construction principals for the massive rebuilding programme that was needed. Among the leading politicians, flown in from Moscow three years earlier, there was no one with the necessary expertise. From within Germany, even among the architects untainted by suspicion of National Socialist crimes, misdemeanours or sympathies, none had the necessary knowledge. So Kurt Liebknecht was installed in a succession of hugely influential positions by the Soviet Military. Firstly, within the Ministry for Reconstruction, he was made head of the "Institute for Urban Building and Construction" ("Institut für Städtebau und Hochbau"). Presidency of the "Bauakademie" would followed in 1951. The objective was to give the cities a "new Soviet face" to convey to the war-shattered populations the Kremlin vision for a new way of living. Wide street with space for parades or, where necessary, more serious troop deployments. In an echo of the fallen regime, the people must be "impressed" by the scale of public buildings. Old city centres with their winding alleys and little hidden courtyards, shops, banks, cafes and general stores were to be torn down. Boulevards which had once provided the stage sets for civic life and places for people to meet up should disappear and be replaced by empty yawning open spaces which could not easily be replaced. Early concepts of city life must be obliterated. Public space must become nationalised, visible and controllable. Liebknecht was also co-opted to work with the German Economic Commission ("Deutsche Wirtschaftskommission"), an innocuously named organisation which formed the basis for a future government in the event that the direct control by the Soviet Military should ever be relaxed. Within the Commission Liebknecht served as head of the department responsible for administering building and constructions.

=== German Democratic Republic ===
On 7 October 1949 the Soviet occupation zone was relaunched as the Soviet sponsored German Democratic Republic (East Germany) and Liebknecht's career in state-backed urban planning and architecture progressed further. He joined the party only in December 1949, but his record in the Soviet Union evidently ensured that as far as the new state was concerned his political credentials were beyond reproach from the outset. Nevertheless, between 1950 and 1954 he undertook a fur year "distance learning" course with the Karx Marx Party [political] Academy. Till 1951 Liebknecht retained his post as director at the "Institute for Urban Building and Construction" ("Institut für Städtebau und Hochbau"). During this time, as the leading East German expert on Soviet city construction, in April/May 1950, he spent seven week as part of a high-level government delegation to the Soviet Union, led by the Minister for Reconstruction, Lothar Bolz. The East Germans had the opportunity to inspect and study architectural precepts being applied in the "great socialist brother state", visiting Moscow, Kiev, Stalingrad (as it was still known at the time) and Leningrad. Shortly after the delegation returned home the results of the visit were published in East Germany as the "16 principles of urban building" ("16 Grundsätze des Städtebaus“"). This set the pattern for numerous development and redevelopment schemes including, most prominently, the "Stalin-Alle" (formerly the "Große Frankfurter Straße", and since 1961 the "Karl-Marx-Allee") which, as a major boulevard development fit for a socialist future, became an important part of the government's propaganda repertoire.

In 1950 Liebknecht undertook a research contract to analyse clinical facilities in the region administered till 1952 (and again after 1990) as the State of Brandenburg. In 1951 he was given a professorship at the "Hochschule für Baukunst" in Weimar, although there are strong indications that his own contributions to the East German built environment took little account of the Bauhaus ideas which had inspired the institution, differently named, before 1933. Meanwhile, the government gave him a lead role in the planning of the Bauakademie (college of building and architecture), set in the heart of East Berlin, which finally opened its doors in January 1951. Kurt Liebknecht became its first president in April 1951. As the director of the academy, around this time he issued a couple of papers concerning the artistic character of city architecture ("Kunstcharakter des Städtebaus") and on "national traditions" ("nationale Traditionen"): between them these did much to define the direction of the academic study of architecture in East Germany during the 1950s. His subsequent membership, starting in February 1951, of the artistic sciences council at the Ministry of Culture meant he was part of the nationalk leadership team. He also held the post of acting head of the Architecture advisory council to the Council of Ministers. Another government appointment came in 1952 when he joined the presudium of the "Society for foreign cultural links" ("Gesellschaft für kulturelle Verbindung mit dem Ausland"). In terms of the political hierarchy his most significant appointment came in 1954 when he became one of (at this stage) just 90 members of the Party Central Committee: he retained his membership till 1963.

In some ways the death of Stalin marked the beginning of the end of Liebknecht's stellar career. He remained in post as president of the ""Bauakademie" till 1961, but never entirely came to terms with the emerging trends in architecture during the second half of the 1950s. His successor at the Bauakademie was Gerhard Kosel (1909–2003), who had also worked successfully as an architect in the Soviet Union, returning to East Germany, as the Krushchev era dawned, only in September 1954. Liebknecht's career took a clear stumble in 1961 with his appointment as director at the "Institute for the theory and history of architecture" ("Institut für Theorie und Geschichte der Architektur"), which was clearly a significantly less influential position than the one from which he had retired. He remained in that position for just after a year, following which he took on the rectorship at the newly founded "Technical Institute for Healthcare Building Construction" ("Instituts für Technologie der Gesundheitsbauten"), where he remained till his retirement in 1970. After 1970 he continued to participate in committees at the "Bauakademie", and even after 1972 for several years he took a leading role at the professional Association of East German architects (BdA), which had emerged in 1952 from the enforced splitting of the old Association of German Architects. As a pensioner he continued to undertake freelance work.

Kurt Liebknecht published his autobiography under the title "Mein bewegtes Leben" in 1986. Some commentators feel that in it he rather glossed over some of the more brutal aspects of his time in the Soviet Union.

== Awards and honours (selection) ==
- 1970: Patriotic Order of Merit in Silver
- 1971: Schinkel Medal (East German virtual equivalent of West German Schinkel prize)
- 1975: Patriotic Order of Merit in Gold
- 1980: Order of Karl Marx
- 1985: Star of People's Friendship

== Output (selection) ==
- Gesundheitsbau – Projektierung unter den Bedingungen Mittelasiens; Moskau 1945 (doctoral dissertation)
- Fragen der deutschen Architektur und des Städtebaus; 1952 (as co-author)
- Sowjetische Architektur; 1953 (as co-author)
- Handbuch für Architektur; 1954 (as co-author)
- Die nationalen Aufgaben der deutschen Architektur; Deutsche Bauakademie 1954
- Architektur und Städtebau in der DDR; 1959 (as co-author)
- Baupolitik und Bauwissenschaft in den ersten Jahren der DDR; Ost-Berlin 1980
- Mein bewegtes Leben; autobiography, Verlag für Bauwesen, Ost-Berlin 1986, ISBN 3-345-00039-3
