= Josef Kaiser =

German urban architect

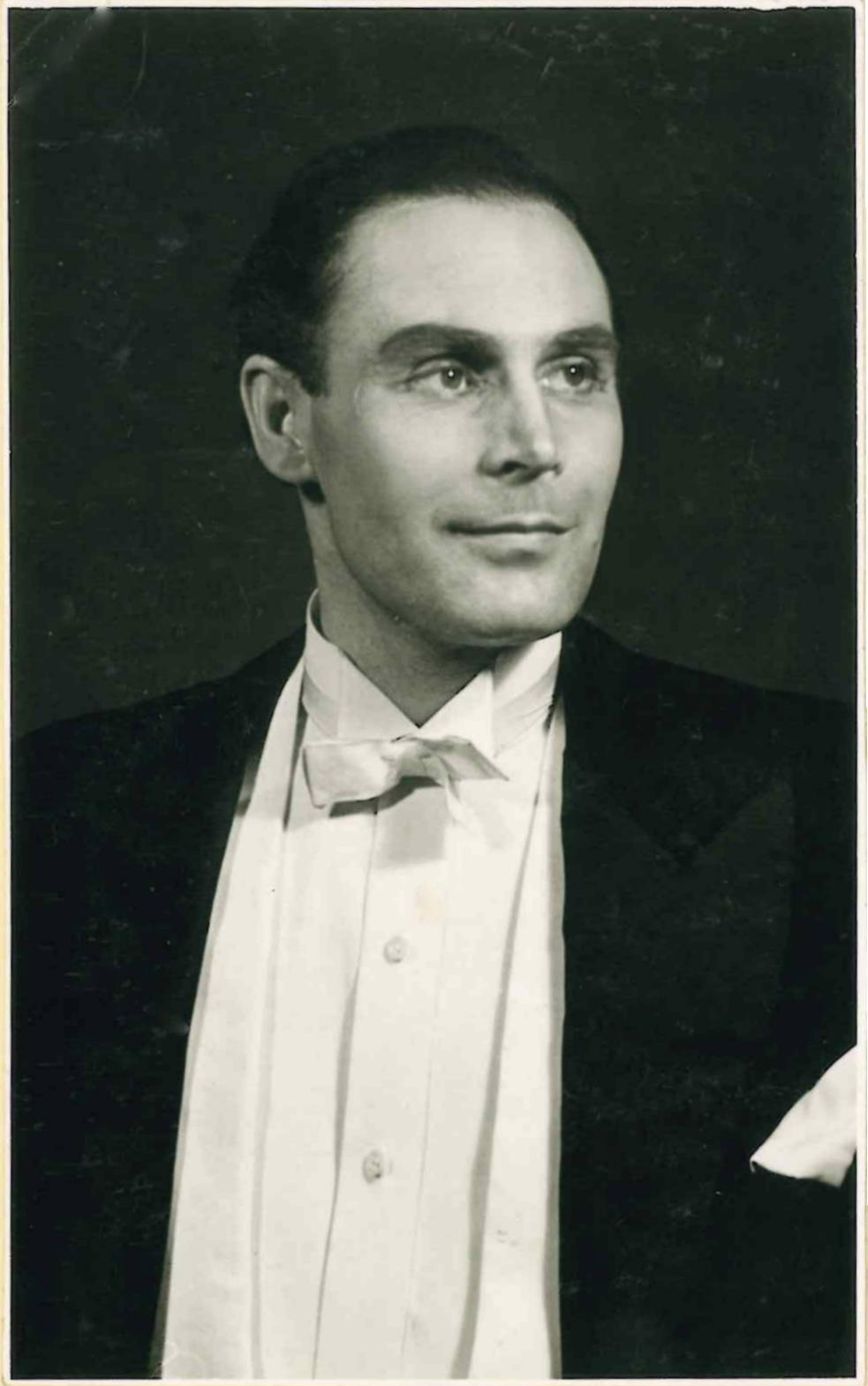
Josef Kaiser

Josef Kaiser (1 May 1910 – 5 October 1991) was an East German urban architect associated, in particular, with a number of the country's more high-profile building projects during the 1950s and 1960s. In 1946, following serious illness, he embarked on a career as an operatic tenor: five years later he returned to architecture.

== Life ==
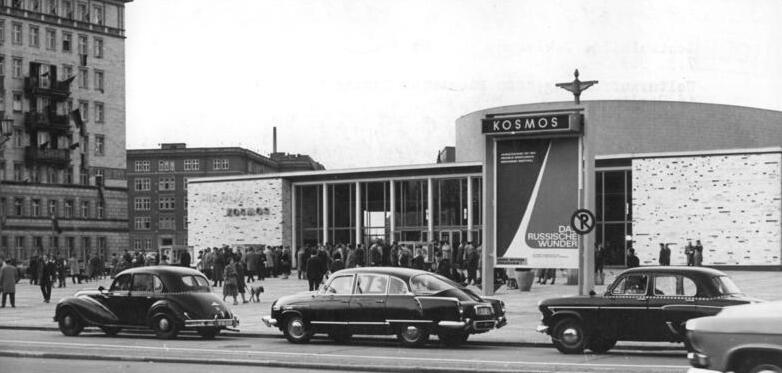
Cinema Kosmos, Karl-Marx-Allee

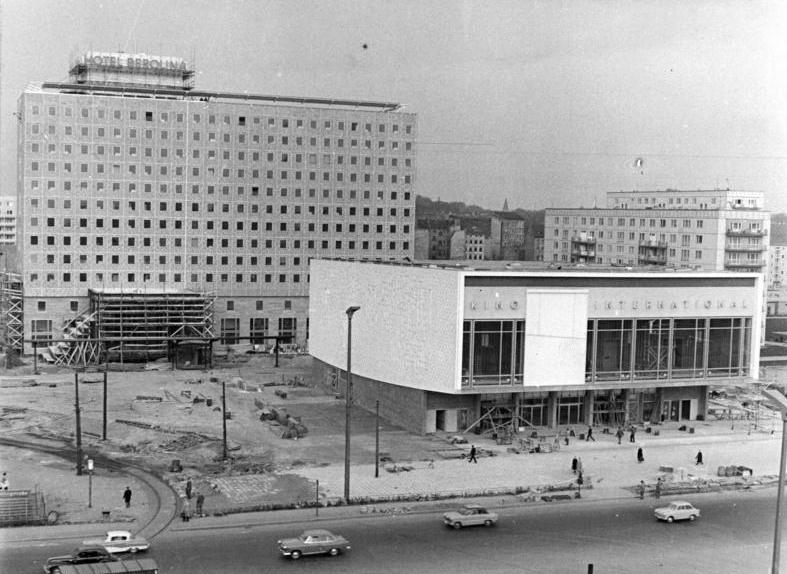
Hotel Berolina under construction with Kino International (film theatre) in the foreground

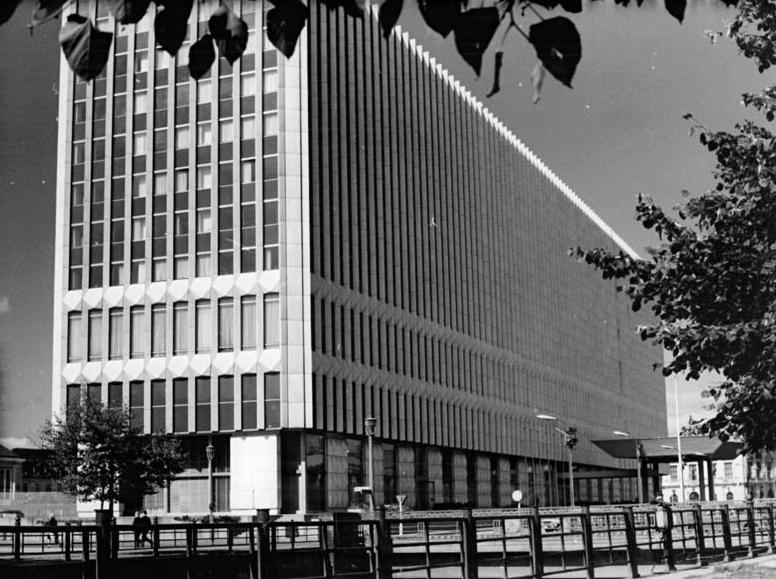
Ministry for Foreign Affairs

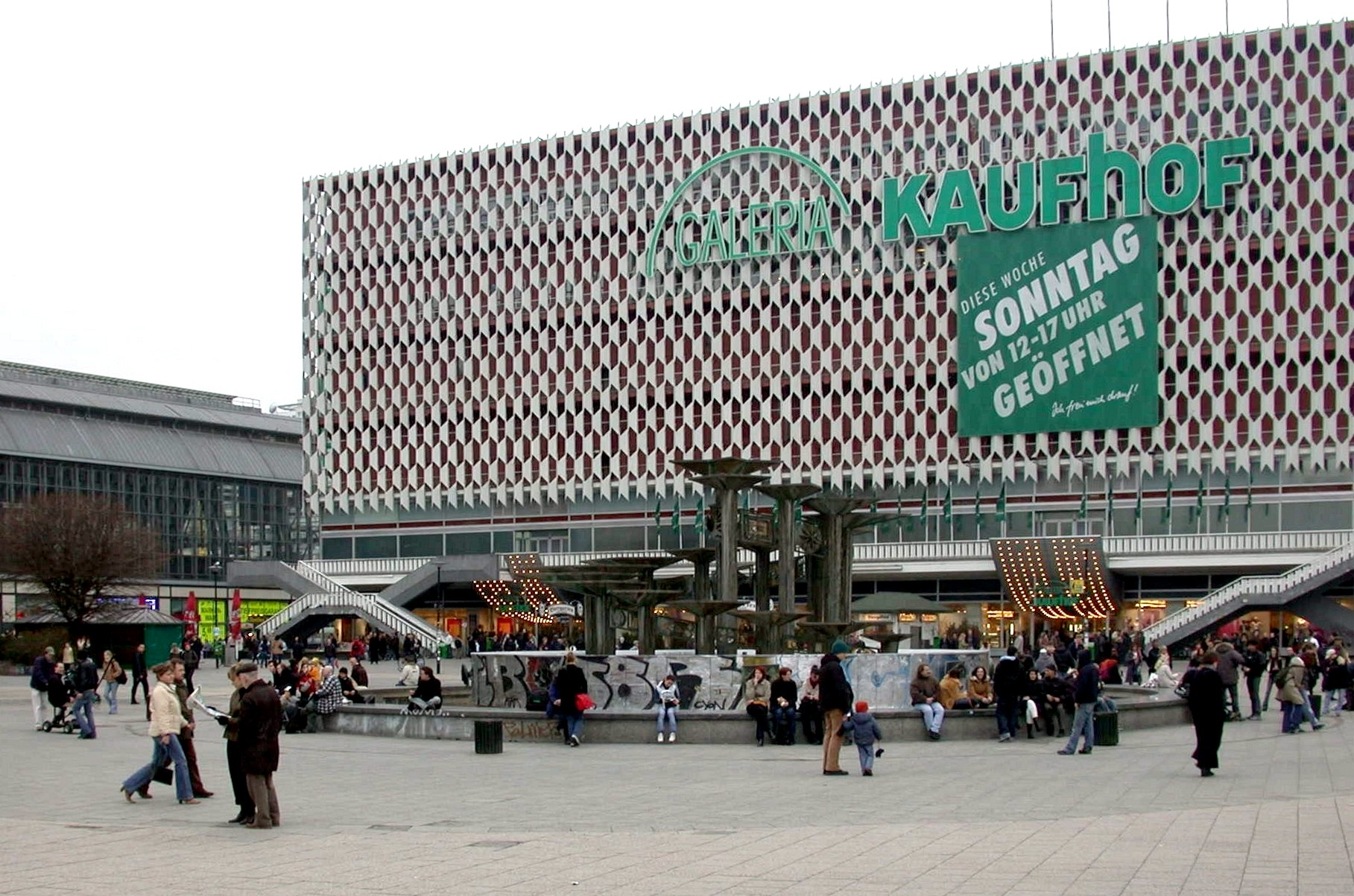
Centrum Warenhaus (retail emporium) in the Alexanderplatz before the removal, in 2004, of the aluminium cladding

Josef Kaiser was born in Celje, a small town east of Laibach, then in Austria-Hungary and today in Slovenia. Between 1929 and 1935 he studied at the Deutsche Technische Hochschule Prag in Prague, then moving to Berlin where he worked with Otto Kohtz. He combined this with work for a less well known architect, Ernst Flemming, in Weimar. It is unclear whether the move from democratic Prague to Berlin (since 1933 the capital of an openly post-democratic state) was politically motivated, or driven simply by the economic opportunities: certainly debt funded economic growth had by this time triggered a building boom in Berlin which provided plenty work opportunities for an ambitious young architect. Between 1936 and 1941 Kaiser was employed by the German Labour Front architecture department, headed up by Julius Schulte-Frohlinde. The Nazi government took a far more "hands-on" approach to the national economy than would hitherto have been contemplated by politicians, and the German Labour Front operated in some respects as a branch of government. In 1938 Josef Kaiser became a Nazi Party member. Between 1941 and 1945 Josef Kaiser was head of the "Basic conceptual planning" ("Grundrisstypenplanung") department at the "Germany Academy for Residential Housing" in Berlin-Buch.

In May 1945 Second World War ended, and with it the Nazi régime. For Josef Kaiser it was also the year in which he underwent serious illness. On his recovery he embarked on a striking career switch, enrolling in 1946 at the Dresden Music Academy where he trained for a career as an opera singer. In 1948 he joined the company at the Nollendorf Theatre in what later came to be known as West Berlin.

In or before 1951 he returned to his profession as an architect. Between 1945 and 1949 the western two thirds of Germany were divided up and administered as four military occupation zones, and arrangement which was replicated in respect of Berlin. After 1949 and the relaunch of the country as not one but two Germanys the implicit division of Berlin began to be reflected in political and physical divisions so that it was no longer to wander unknowingly between the two halves of the city. Josef Kaiser now made his career in the German Democratic Republic (East Germany). Between 1951 and 1955 he worked on the East German Building Academy's Master Studio II ("Meisterwerkstatt II "). He was already, in 1952, Chief Architect for the Stalinstadt new town project, where he was personally responsible for the "Residential Apartments Complex II" zone.

Although he lived and worked in what had become, in the eyes of many, Germany's second one-party dictatorship, at least one source asserts that he never did become a party member, which would make Josef Kaiser's stellar architectural career during the 1950s and 1960s all the more remarkable. Between 1955 and 1958 he worked in the office of East Berlin's chief architects. Between 1956 and 1958 he also undertook important commissions in the west, including apartment blocks in Essen, Mannheim and West Berlin. In 1962 he took charge of Development Collective for the Second Phase redevelopment programme of East Berlin's prestigious Karl-Marx-Allee (extending from Strausberger Platz to Alexanderplatz).

Between 1969 and 1972 Kaiser held a professorship at the Bauhaus University in Weimar. In 1973 he became chief architect and personal advisor to the Director of Constriction Management for Special Construction Projects in East Berlin, Erhard Gißke. In reality, however, by now he was withdrawing from active participation in architecture.

Josef Kaiser died on 5 October 1991 at Altenberg, in the ore rich mountains that mark the boundary between Saxony and what was then Czechoslovakia.

== Major projects ==
- 1951–1955: "Arts Palace" at the VEB Maxhütte steelworks, Unterwellenborn
- 1952–1954: Residential Apartments Complex II, Stalinstadt
- 1956–1958: Accommodation Blocks in Mannheim and Essen
- 1964–1968: Ministry for Foreign Affairs
- 1967–1970: Centrum Warenhaus (retail emporium) in Berliner Alexanderplatz

Berlin, Karl-Marx-Allee:

- 1960–1962: Cinema Kosmos
- 1961–1963: Kino International (film theatre) and Hotel Berolina
- 1961–1964: Café Moskau

== Awards and honours ==
- National Prize of the German Democratic Republic
- Patriotic Order of Merit in silver
