= List of members of the sixth Volkskammer =

This list provides an overview of all members of the Volkskammer of the GDR in the 6th legislative period (1971–1976).

== Composition ==
In the 1971 East German general election, according to official records, 99.85% of the voters supported the proposal of the National Front.

Faction	Seats	by Party Affiliation
SED	127	284
DBD	52	52
CDU	52	54
LDPD	52	53
NDPD	52	53
FDGB	68	–
DFD	35	–
FDJ	40	–
KB	22	–
Non-partisan	–	
Total	500	500

The election did not influence the strength of the factions. Their size was predetermined. The right column in the above table considers the party affiliations of the members within the factions of FDGB, DFD, FDJ, and Kulturbund.

== Presidium ==
- President of the People's Chamber

Gerald Götting (CDU)

- Deputy President of the People's Chamber

Friedrich Ebert (SED)

- Members of the Presidium:

Erich Mückenberger (SED)
Wilhelmine Schirmer-Pröscher (DFD)
Heinz Eichler (SED)
Karl-Heinz Schulmeister (Kulturbund)
Egon Krenz (FDJ)
Ernst Goldenbaum (DBD)
Willi-Peter Konzok (LDPD)
Margarete Müller (FDGB)
Wolfgang Rösser (NDPD)

== Faction Leaders ==
- Faction of the SED

Friedrich Ebert

- Faction of the DBD

Leonhard Helmschrott

- Faction of the CDU

Wolfgang Heyl

- Faction of the LDPD

Rudolf Agsten

- Faction of the NDPD

Siegfried Dallmann

- Faction of the FDGB

Hans Jendretzky

- Faction of the DFD

Katharina Kern

- Faction of the FDJ

Egon Krenz

- Faction of the KB

Karl-Heinz Schulmeister, KB

== MPs ==
Name	Faction	Remarks
Alexander Abusch	KB	
Rudolf Agsten	LDPD	
Erika Albrecht	DFD	
Hans Albrecht	SED	
Heinz Albrecht	SED	Berlin representative
Kurt Anclam	LDPD	
Manfred von Ardenne	KB	
Klaus-Rüdiger Arnold	FDGB	
Truste Arnold	CDU	
Hermann Axen	SED	
Annemarie Balke	FDGB	
Julius Balkow	SED	died on July 19, 1973
Helga Barsch	DFD	Berlin representative
Dieter Bartelt	SED	
Edith Baumann	SED	Berlin representative deceased on April 7, 1973
Manfred Becher	LDPD	
Christel Bednareck	FDGB	Berlin representative
Friedl Behnke	FDGB	
Bärbel Behrens	CDU	
Ursula Berger	FDJ	
Wiete Bergmann	FDGB	
Dietrich Besler	SED	Berlin representative
Wolfgang Beyreuther	FDGB	
Ewald Bialas	FDGB	
Helmut Birckner	FDGB	
Heinz Böhm	CDU	
Siegfried Böhm	SED	
Marta-Maria Böttcher	NDPD	
Karl-Heinz Bohm	SED	Berlin representative
Walter Boltz	DBD	Berlin representative
Lothar Bolz	NDPD	
Friderun Bondzin	KB	
Hans Brachmann	FDGB	
Alois Bräutigam	SED	
Horst Brasch	SED	
Christoph Brückner	LDPD	
Dieter Bruska	FDJ	
Hermann Budzislawski	FDGB	
Elke Centner	FDJ	
Johannes Chemnitzer	SED	
Gerhard Clausner	SED	
Manfred Clauss	SED	
Friedrich Clermont	SED	
Erich Correns	KB	
Ursula Czeczot	CDU	
Franz Dahlem	SED	
Siegfried Dallmann	NDPD	
Hans Deckert	NDPD	
Gerd Delenschke	NDPD	Berlin representative
Friedrich Dickel	SED	
Herta Dippe	FDGB	
Regina Dittmar	DFD	
Horst Döll	NDPD	
Ursula Dörner	DFD	
Horst Dohlus	SED	
Marianne Dorn	NDPD	Berlin representative
Konrad Dorow	FDGB	
Heinz Dreblow	SED	
Michael Drechsler	FDJ	
Gertraut Dreihardt	DFD	
Paul Eberle	LDPD	Berlin representative
Friedrich Ebert	SED	
Harry Eckardt	FDGB	Berlin representative
Herbert Eichhorn	DBD	
Heinz Eichler	SED	Berlin representative
Ludwig Elm	KB	
Christa Elsner	LDPD	
Klaus Elsner	DBD	Berlin representative
Hildegard Endler	FDGB	on June 13, 1973, for Rep. knight moved up
Christine Engelhardt	FDJ	
Renate Engelke	FDJ	
Gottfried Engelmann	LDPD	
Albert Enke	FDGB	
Elisabeth Erdmann	NDPD	
Luise Ermisch	SED	
Heino Ernst	FDGB	
Wilma Ettlich	KB	
Georg Ewald	SED	deceased on September 14, 1973
Manfred Ewald	SED	
Ulrich Fahl	CDU	
Heinz Fahrenkrog	FDGB	
Herbert Fechner	SED	Berlin representative
Werner Feist	LDPD	
Werner Felfe	SED	
Kurt Fenske	SED	
Otto Fiedler	DBD	Berlin representative
Doris Finke	FDGB	
Margit Fippel	FDJ	
Horst Fischer	NDPD	
Manfred Flegel	NDPD	
Peter Florin	SED	
Friedhelm Foerster	NDPD	
Jürgen Franke	FDJ	
Erich Franz	NDPD	
Helga Freiberg	NDPD	Berlin representative
Heinz Freier	SED	on December 3, 1975, for Rep. Warnke moved up
Anna-Maria Freyer	DFD	
Eckehard Friedrich	FDJ	
Gisela Fuchs	DFD	
Friedel Fuckel	DFD	
Otto Funke	SED	
Heinz Gattung	FDGB	
Brigitte Gaumitz	FDJ	
Helmut Geiger	CDU	
Manfred Gerlach	LDPD	
Horst Gessner	LDPD	
Sieghard Geyhler	FDJ	
Joachim-Ernst Gierspeck	LDPD	
Anita Gläser	FDJ	
Grete Glawe	FDGB	
Willi Görß	FDGB	
Siegfried Glöckner	SED	on December 19, 1973, for Rep. Balkow moved up
Gerald Götting	CDU	
Ernst Goldenbaum	DBD	
Erich Grabowski	DBD	
Manfred Graetz	FDJ	
Willi Grandetzka	DBD	
Liselotte Gretzschel	SED	
Günther Grewe	CDU	
Roberta Gropper	FDGB	Berlin representative
Ines Grosche	CDU	
Manfred Grossmann	FDGB	
Gerhard Grüneberg	SED	
Erich Grützner	SED	
Marie Gunder	DBD	
Wolfgang Guttke	FDGB	
Klaus Gysi	KB	
Hildegard Haase	DBD	
Susanne Häber	DBD	
Kurt Hager	SED	
Erika Hahn	LDPD	
Ruth Hahn	DFD	
Ulrich Hahnefeld	FDJ	
Walter Halbritter	SED	
Wolfram Haller	CDU	
Irmgard Haltinner	SED	Berlin representative
Gero Hammer	NDPD	
Emmy Handke	DFD	Berlin representative
Brunhilde Hanke	SED	
Siegfried Hanusch	FDGB	
Gertrud Hartmann	DBD	
Günter Hartmann	NDPD	Berlin representative on July 12, 1973, for the deputy Siemon moved up
Walter Hartung	NDPD	
Kurt Haupt	CDU	
Thea Hauschild	SED	
Günter Hegner	DBD	
Hildegard Heine	SED	
Horst Heinrich	NDPD	
Brunhilde Heinrichs	SED	
Günther Heinze	FDGB	
Gerda Heller	LDPD	
Leonhard Helmschrott	DBD	
Egon Hengelhaupt	FDGB	
Karlheinz Hengst	NDPD	
Waltraut Hennig	LDPD	
Anneliese Hennlich	CDU	
Karin Hensel	SED	
Johannes Herda	CDU	
Lieselott Herforth	FDGB	
Wolfgang Herger	FDJ	
Hans-Joachim Hertwig	SED	
Hans-Joachim Heusinger	LDPD	
Wolfgang Heyl	CDU	
Edith Hilgenfeld	FDJ	
Heino Hinze	KB	
Annelotte Hochhaus	DFD	
Friedrich Höpfner	LDPD	
Elisabeth Höpner	FDGB	
Rudolf Höppner	FDGB	Berlin representative
Anni Hoffmann	SED	
Heinz Hoffmann	SED	
Heinz-Rudolf Hoffmann	CDU	Berlin representative
Gunhild Hoffmeister	FDJ	
Sabine Hofmann	FDGB	
Christa Hojer	CDU	
Horst Holinski	FDGB	
Witho Holland	LDPD	Berlin representative
Gerhard Holtz-Baumert	KB	
Ilse Holtzbecher	CDU	Berlin representative
Heinrich Homann	NDPD	
Erich Honecker	SED	
Margot Honecker	SED	
Horst Hornung	FDGB	
Heinz Hoßfeld	FDGB	
Claus Howitz	DBD	
Claus-Jürgen Huch	NDPD	
Max Hübner	FDGB	
Max Hüniger	DBD	on March 9, 1972, for Titel moved up
Wilfried Ihle	FDGB	
Helga Isenberg	LDPD	on June 19, 1975, for Rep. Paul moved up
Barbara Jacob	FDGB	
Karl Jäger	DBD	
Bernhard Jahn	LDPD	
Günther Jahn	FDJ	
Werner Jarowinsky	SED	
Christa Jauch	LDPD	
Hans Jendretzky	FDGB	
Ulrike Jereschinski	NDPD	
Hertha Jung	DFD	
Karl Kaatz	LDPD	
Ingeborg Kachel	FDGB	Berlin representative
Erich Kärger	DBD	
Susanne Kahlert	DFD	
Elfi Kaiser	CDU	Berlin representative
Siegfried Kaiser	FDGB	Berlin representative
Hermann Kalb	CDU	
Werner Kalweit	SED	
Susi Kammerath	SED	Berlin representative
Werner Karwath	CDU	
Karl Kayser	KB	
Willi Keindorf	SED	
Katharina Kern	DFD	
Heinz Keßler	SED	
Gustav Kiesewetter	LDPD	
Bruno Kiesler	SED	
Friedrich Kind	CDU	
Franz Kirchner	CDU	
Ruth Kirsch	SED	
Joachim Kirst	FDJ	
Helmtraut Klara	DFD	Berlin representative
Günther Kleiber	SED	
Ingeborg Kleinert	SED	
Gottfried Klepel	FDGB	
Heinz Kliemt	LDPD	
Wilfried Klöser	FDGB	
Heinz Knobbe	SED	
Lucie Knobloch	DBD	Berlin representative
Claus-Dieter Knöfler	LDPD	
Heinz Knorr	NDPD	
Hans Koch	KB	
Erwin Körber	DBD	
Lothar Kolbe	CDU	
Willi-Peter Konzok	LDPD	
Edith Krambeer	NDPD	
Edda Kramer	DFD	
Erwin Kramer	SED	
Heinz Kratkey	NDPD	
Martin Kraul	KB	
Johanna Krause	DBD	
Rosemarie Krautzig	CDU	Berlin representative
Egon Krenz	FDJ	
Kurt Krenz	SED	
Walter Kresse	SED	
Horst Kreter	NDPD	Berlin representative
Waldemar Kreutzberger	NDPD	
Werner Krolikowski	SED	
Liesbeth Krüger	SED	Berlin representative
Renate Krüger	FDJ	
Franz Kuhlmann	CDU	
Gerhard Kühn	LDPD	Berlin representative
Hermann Kühne	DBD	
Joachim Kühne	FDGB	
Ulrike Kunert	FDJ	
Traude Kunz	SED	
Gerhard Kupke	SED	
Alfred Kurella	SED	deceased on June 12, 1975
Hannelore Kutschenreuter	FDJ	
Ursula Kutzner	CDU	
Werner Lamberz	SED	
Alfred Lange	FDJ	
Elfriede Lange	FDGB	
Gerhard Lange	CDU	
Ilse Lange	FDGB	
Ingeburg Lange	SED	
Wolfgang Lange	DBD	
Renate Lausch	FDJ	
Ursula Lebelt	DBD	
Hannelore Lehmann	SED	Berlin representative
Peter Lekebusch	FDJ	
Wolfgang Lesser	KB	
Marlies Leszcynski	FDJ	
Harri Leupold	LDPD	Berlin representative
Edith Liebig	LDPD	on December 14, 1972, for Rep. Ott moved up
Gerhard Lindner	LDPD	
Johannes Löhn	LDPD	
Ilse Lorenz	DBD	
Siegfried Lorenz	FDJ	
Werner Lorenz	KB	
Gerhard Lotz	CDU	
Johanna Ludwig	NDPD	
Heinz Lüder	NDPD	
Wolfgang Lungershausen	SED	
Günter Mähl	NDPD	Berlin representative
Hans-Jürgen Mannweiller	KB	
Paul Markowski	SED	Berlin representative
Heinz Matthes	SED	
Günter Mauritz	SED	
Ernst Mecklenburg	DBD	
Heinrich Meier	NDPD	
Renate Meißner	NDPD	
Werner Mennicke	SED	member since 1965
Else Merke	DBD	
Sieglinde Metten	LDPD	on June 19, 1975, for Dept. Sirch moved up
Gerhard Rudolf Meyer	KB	Berlin representative
Erich Mielke	SED	
Gudrun Miethig	CDU	
Günter Mittag	SED	
Hans Modrow	SED	Berlin representative
Hans-Dietrich Möller	NDPD	
Siegfried Mohr	SED	
Günter Morge	LDPD	
Helga Mucke-Wittbrodt	DFD	
Erich Mückenberger	SED	
Emma Müller	FDGB	
Helmut Müller	SED	Berlin representative
Herbert Müller	DBD	
Inge Müller	DFD	
Joachim Müller	FDGB	
Margarete Müller	FDGB	
Margarete Müller	SED	
Walter Müller	SED	
Gerhard Münch	NDPD	
Gerd Natschinski	LDPD	Berlin representative
Harald Naumann	CDU	
Konrad Naumann	SED	Berlin representative
Gudrun Nause	DFD	
Heinz Neukrantz	FDGB	
Alfred Neumann	SED	
Anni Neumann	FDGB	
Gisela Neumann	DFD	
Adolf Niggemeier	CDU	Berlin representative
Edeltraut Nitz	DBD	
Rolf Noack	DBD	
Walter Nörenberg	LDPD	
Albert Norden	SED	
Peter Offermann	CDU	
Manfred Oßwald	FDJ	
Herbert Ott	LDPD	deceased on September 5, 1972
Friedrich Otto	NDPD	
Werner Pagel	CDU	
Walter Parey	FDGB	
Hans-Joachim Paul	LDPD	died on February 2, 1975
Marga Paulitschke	DFD	
Heike Pemsel	CDU	
Hans-Günter Petzold	CDU	Berlin representative
Friedrich Pfaffenbach	NDPD	Berlin representative
Ludwig Pfeiffer	NDPD	
Alfons Piatkowski	DBD	
Alois Pisnik	SED	
Rolf Poche	SED	
Horst Pommerenk	LDPD	
Eberhard Poppe	KB	
Rudolf Porschitz	NDPD	
Georg Porst	FDGB	
Alois Proksch	CDU	
Margot Pschebizin	FDGB	
Otto Püllmann	FDGB	
Max Putze	SED	
Bernhard Quandt	SED	
Helga Rateitzak	FDGB	
Wolfgang Rauchfuss	SED	
Helene Rausche	LDPD	
Eberhard Rebling	KB	Berlin representative
Horst Rehtanz	FDGB	
Hans Reichelt	DBD	
Ute Reiher	FDGB	
Rosel Reimann	FDGB	
Sieglinde Reinicke	DBD	
Manfred Rentsch	NDPD	
Heike Richter	FDJ	
Brunhilde Rienecker	DFD	
Hans Rietz	DBD	
Renate Ritter	DBD	
Hans Rodenberg	SED	
Ilse Rodenberg	NDPD	Berlin representative
Fritz Rösel	FDGB	
Christine Rösicke	FDJ	
Wolfgang Rösser	NDPD	
Alfred Rohde	SED	
Paul Roscher	SED	
Gitta Roschkowski	FDJ	Berlin representative
Karla Rose	CDU	
Marianne Roß	DBD	
Harald Rost	SED	
Christian-Wilhelm Rowoldt	NDPD	
Anneliese Sälzler	KB	
Franz-Josef Salbreiter	CDU	
Gertrud Sasse	LDPD	
Paul Saul	SED	
Horst Schewe	SED	
Bernd Schindler	FDGB	
Gregor Schirmer	KB	
Wilhelmine Schirmer-Pröscher	DFD	
Ursula Schlosser	DFD	
Anneliese Schmidt	DFD	
Gerhard Schmidt	DBD	
Wolfgang Schmidt	FDJ	
Erhard Schnarrer	LDPD	
Maria Schneider	FDGB	
Karl-Heinz Schniebs	DBD	Berlin representative
Paul Scholz	DBD	
Max Schreiber	FDGB	
Bernd Schröder	FDJ	
Manfred Schröder	NDPD	
Ingeborg Schubert	DFD	
Kurt Schubert	NDPD	
Manfred Schubert	SED	
Gerhard Schürer	SED	
Karl-Heinz Schulmeister	KB	
Rudolph Schulze	CDU	
Horst Schumann	SED	
Gustav-Adolf Schur	SED	
Erika Schweder	NDPD	
Max Sefrin	CDU	
Werner Seifert	DBD	
Hans Seigewasser	SED	
Anneliese Seume	NDPD	
Max Seydewitz	SED	
Rolf Sieber	FDGB	
Heinz Siebert	DBD	
Gustav Siemon	NDPD	Berlin representative on July 12, 1973, announced that he would hand over his mandate
Rosemarie Sievert	LDPD	
Käte Sima	FDJ	Berlin representative
Hans-Heinrich Simon	NDPD	
Horst Sindermann	SED	
Rudolf Singer	SED	
Erna Sirch	LDPD	resigned on June 19, 1975
Heinz Sock	LDPD	
Hans-Jürgen Sommer	FDJ	
Winfried Sonntag	SED	
Klaus Sorgenicht	SED	
Rudolph Springer	FDGB	deceased on January 19, 1973
Ilona Stadtmüller	FDJ	Berlin representative
Gerd Staegemann	NDPD	
Karl-Hermann Steinberg	CDU	
Manfred Steiner	DBD	
Ursula Steinert	CDU	
Werner Steuwer	LDPD	
Albert Stief	SED	
Willi Stoph	SED	
Paul Strauß	SED	
Hans Stubbe	KB	
Klaus-Dietrich Sturm	SED	
Rita Szidzick		Berlin representative moved up on February 5, 1976
Waltraud Tänzer	SED	
Siegfried Tannhäuser	SED	
Bruno Thalmann	LDPD	Berlin representative died on November 30, 1975
Fritz Thiele	DBD	
Ilse Thiele	DFD	
Gerda Thielemann	SED	on December 3, 1975, for Rep. Kurella moved up
Kurt Thieme	SED	Berlin representative
Wolfgang Thieme	CDU	
Guido Thoms	SED	on December 19, 1973, for Rep. Ewald moved up
Lieselotte Thoms-Heinrich	DFD	Berlin representative
Hans-Manfred Thurm	CDU	
Harry Tisch	SED	
Werner Titel	DBD	died on December 25, 1971
Rosemarie Töpfer	DFD	
Heinrich Toeplitz	CDU	
Gottfried Torbicki	NDPD	
Herbert Trebs	CDU	
Harry Trumpold	LDPD	
Fritz Tschetschorke	DBD	
Walter Ulbricht	SED	deceased on August 1, 1973
Hans Ulrich	NDPD	
Dietrich Unangst	NDPD	
Johannes Unger	FDGB	
Rolf Unger	LDPD	
Paul Verner	SED	
Anni Vogt	CDU	
Dietrich Voigtberger	CDU	Berlin representative
Roland Voigtländer	DBD	
Rudolf Wabersich	DBD	
Gerhard Wagner	LDPD	
Werner Walde	SED	
Hans Waldmann	SED	on December 3, 1975, for Rep. Winzer moved up
Rosel Walther	NDPD	
Herbert Warnke	SED	deceased on April 3, 1975
Hans Watzek	DBD	
Christine Wedegärtner	FDJ	
Wolfgang Weichelt	SED	
Johannes Weidauer	NDPD	
Ingrid Weigelt	DFD	
Marta Weigt	DFD	
Margot Weilert	SED	on December 19, 1973, for Rep. Ulbricht moved up
Regine Weinhold	DFD	Berlin representative
Gerhard Weiss	SED	
Wilhelm Weißgärber	DBD	
Herbert Weiz	SED	
Charlotte Welm	FDGB	
Regina Wenck	SED	Berlin representative
Anni Wendt	CDU	
Ruth Wendt	SED	
Josef Wenig	FDGB	
Monika Werner	SED	
Harald Werthmann	LDPD	Berlin representative
Gerolf Wetzel	DBD	
Günter Wiedemann	LDPD	
Hans-Joachim Wiesner	SED	
Susanne Wigger	FDJ	
Karin-Christiane Wilhelm	CDU	
Richard O. Wilhelm	LDPD	
Gudrun Wilma	LDPD	Berlin representative
Lisbeth Windisch	DFD	
Otto Winzer	SED	deceased on March 3, 1975
Karl-Heinz Wirzberger	FDGB	deceased on April 23, 1976
Werner Wittig	SED	deceased on January 8, 1976
Gunter Wittmann	FDJ	
Ingeborg Wötzel	DFD	
Günter Wolf	FDGB	
Manfred Wolf	FDGB	
Kurt Wünsche	LDPD	1972 Resignation of the mandate
Werner Wünschmann	CDU	
Helmut Wunderlich	SED	
Stephan Zagrodnik	DBD	
Gisela Zepp	DFD	
Herbert Ziegenhahn	SED	
Heinz Ziegner	SED	
Brigitte Zenert	DFD	
Günter Zierold	FDGB	
Erwin Ziesmann	DBD	
Friedrich Zirpel	LDPD	
Hermann Zweigler	LDPD	
