= List of members of the fifth Volkskammer =

This list provides an overview of all members of the People's Chamber of the GDR in the 5th legislative period (1967–1971).

== Composition ==
In the 1967 East German general election, according to official information, 99.93% of the voters voted for the proposal of the National Front.

Faction	Seats of GDR deputies	Seats of Berlin representatives	Total seats	by party affiliation
SED	110	17	127	275
DBD	45	7	52	52
CDU	45	7	52	54
LDPD	45	7	52	53
NDPD	45	7	52	53
FDGB	60	8	68	-
DFD	30	5	35	-
FDJ	35	5	40	-
Kulturbund	15	3	22	-
Independent				13
Total	434	66	500	500

The election did not influence the strength of the factions. Their size was predetermined.

== Presidium ==
- President of the People's Chamber

Johannes Dieckmann (LDPD) Deceased in 1969
Gerald Götting (CDU)

- Deputy President of the People's Chamber

Hermann Matern (SED) Passed away on January 24, 1971
Friedrich Ebert (SED)

- Members of the Presidium:

Hermann Kalb (CDU) Until 1969
Wilhelmine Schirmer-Pröscher (DFD)
Otto Gotsche (SED)
Ernst Goldenbaum (DBD)
Grete Groh-Kummerlöw (FDGB)
Margarete Müller (SED)
Wolfgang Rösser (NDPD)
Willi-Peter Konzok (LDPD) From 1969
Karl-Heinz Schulmeister (Kulturbund) From May 1969
Werner Engst (FDJ) From May 1969

== Faction Leaders ==
- Faction of the SED

Hermann Matern Passed away on January 24, 1971
Friedrich Ebert

- Faction of the DBD

Leonhard Helmschrott

- Faction of the CDU

Wolfgang Heyl

- Faction of the LDPD

Rudolf Agsten

- Faction of the NDPD

Wolfgang Rösser

- Faction of the FDGB

Hans Jendretzky

- Faction of the DFD

Katharina Kern

- Faction of the FDJ

Johannes Rech

- Faction of the Kulturbund

Karl-Heinz Schulmeister

== Members of the Volkskammer ==
Name	Faction	Remarks
Alexander Abusch	KB	
Rudolf Agsten	LDPD	
Eberhard Alff	SED	
Kurt Anclam	LDPD	
Manfred von Ardenne	KB	
Reiner Arlt	SED	
Margarete Arnhold	LDPD	
Klaus-Rüdiger Arnold	FDGB	
Traute Arnold	CDU	
Hermann Axen	SED	
Annemarie Balke	FDGB	
Julius Balkow	SED	
Dieter Bartelt	SED	
Katarina Bartko	LDPD	
Edith Baumann	SED	Berlin representative
Helga Baumgärtel	CDU	
Lilli Becker	LDPD	
Wilhelm Behnke	SED	
Monika Berek	CDU	Berlin representative
Rolf Berger	FDGB	
Peter Bergner	FDJ	
Helmut Bernhöft	FDGB	
Dietrich Besler	SED	Berlin representative
Helmut Birckner	FDGB	
Siegfried Birnstengel	DBD	
Günter Bleisch	FDGB	Berlin representative
Bernhard Bode	FDJ	
Siegfried Böhm	SED	
Ute Börner	DBD	
Marta-Maria Böttcher	NDPD	
Walter Boltz	DBD	Berlin representative
Lothar Bolz	NDPD	
Friderun Bondzin	KB	
Bernhard Bott	DBD	
Alois Bräutigam	SED	
Hans Brachmann	FDJ	
Horst Brasch	SED	
Hella Brock	KB	
Gerhard Broll	SED	
Christoph Brückner	LDPD	
Hermann Budzislawski	FDGB	
Angelika Bullert	FDJ	
Kurt Burkhardt	DBD	
Johannes Chemnitzer	SED	
Gerhard Clausner	SED	on May 14, 1970, for Rep. Spitzner moved up
Manfred Clauss	SED	on December 13, 1968, for Rep. Nice move up
Friedrich Clermont	SED	
Erich Correns	KB	
Ursula Czeczot	CDU	
Franz Dahlem	SED	
Siegfried Dallmann	NDPD	
Hans Deckert	NDPD	
Peter Deistler	FDJ	
Gerd Delenschke	NDPD	Berlin representative
Friedrich Dickel	SED	
Johannes Dieckmann	LDPD	died on February 22, 1969
Käte Dienstbach	FDJ	Berlin representative
Herta Dippe	FDGB	
Regina Dittmar	DFD	
Horst Döll	NDPD	
Ursula Dörner	DFD	
Marianne Dorn	NDPD	
Konrad Dorow	FDGB	Berlin representative
Heinz Dreblow	SED	
Lothar Dreher	CDU	Berlin representative
Sigrid Dünnhaupt	DBD	
Rosemarie Dürrschlag	FDJ	
Paul Eberle	LDPD	Berlin representative
Friedrich Ebert	SED	
Harry Eckardt	FDGB	
Ernst Eichhorn	SED	
Klaus Elsner	DBD	Berlin representative
Gottfried Engelmann	LDPD	on June 24, 1971, for Rep. Thürmer moved up
Werner Engst	FDJ	
Albert Enke	FDGB	
Elisabeth Erdmann	NDPD	
Luise Ermisch	SED	
Georg Ewald	SED	
Manfred Ewald	SED	
Heinz Fahrenkrog	FDGB	
Herbert Fechner	SED	Berlin representative
Werner Feist	LDPD	
Kurt Fenske	SED	
Otto Fiedler	DBD	
Horst Fischer	NDPD	
Manfred Flegel	NDPD	
Rosemarie Flesch	CDU	
Peter Florin	SED	
Friedhelm Foerster	NDPD	Berlin representative on August 13, 1968, for the deputy Löhr moved up
Erich Franz	NDPD	
Anna-Maria Freyer	DFD	
Paul Fröhlich	SED	deceased on September 19, 1970
Gisela Fuchs	DFD	
Hans-Peter Fürch	FDJ	
Otto Funke	SED	
Heinrich Gäbe	SED	
Ernst Gallerach	SED	
Heinz Gattung	FDGB	
Paul Geisler	FDGB	deceased on April 2, 1971
Peter Gerdum	FDJ	
Manfred Gerlach	LDPD	
Horst Gessner	LDPD	
Joachim-Ernst Gierspeck	LDPD	
Utta Gießner	FDJ	
Olga Glanz	LDPD	
Renate Glitza	DFD	
Rudi Glück	LDPD	Berlin representative
Horst Göring	DBD	Berlin representative
Willi Görß	FDGB	
Gerald Götting	CDU	
Ernst Goldenbaum	DBD	
Otto Gotsche	SED	
Erich Grabowski	DBD	
Willi Grandetzka	DBD	
Günther Grewe	CDU	
Grete Groh-Kummerlöw	FDGB	
Roberta Gropper	FDGB	Berlin representative
Manfred Grossman	FDGB	
Gerhard Grüneberg	SED	
Erich Grützner	SED	
Marie Gunder	DBD	
Wolfgang Guttke	FDGB	
Klaus Gysi	KB	
Hildegard Haase	DBD	
Karin Haback	FDJ	Berlin representative
Susanne Häber	DBD	
Heinz Hahne	CDU	
Kurt Hager	SED	
Werner Hager	SED	
Ruth Hahn	DFD	
Walter Halbritter	SED	
Willy Hallbauer	SED	on June 24, 1971, for Rep. Kiess moved up
Wolfram Haller	CDU	
Irmgard Haltinner	SED	Berlin representative
Gero Hammer	NDPD	Berlin representative
Roland Hammermüller	DBD	
Emmy Handke	DFD	Berlin representative
Brunhilde Hanke	SED	
Siegfried Hanusch	FDGB	
Werner Hartleib	FDGB	
Gertrud Hartmann	DBD	
Walter Hartung	NDPD	
Herbert Hasenbein	FDGB	
Edeltraud Haupt	CDU	
Kurt Haupt	CDU	
Walter Hauschild	FDGB	
Hildegard Heine	SED	
Horst Heinrich	NDPD	
Brunhilde Heinrichs	SED	
Günther Heinze	FDGB	
Leonhard Helmschrott	DBD	
Waltraut Hennig	LDPD	
Anneliese Hennlich	CDU	
Hartmut Henschel	FDJ	
Lieselott Herforth	FDGB	
Herbert Hertzsch	FDGB	
Fritz Herzberg	FDGB	
Hans-Joachim Heusinger	LDPD	
Wolfgang Heyl	CDU	
Inge Hieblinger	DFD	
Heino Hinze	KB	
Werner Hölzel	LDPD	
Friedrich Höpfner	LDPD	
Elisabeth Höpner	FDGB	
Anni Hoffmann	SED	
Heinz Hoffmann	SED	
Heinz-Rudolf Hoffmann	CDU	Berlin representative
Christa Hojer	CDU	
Christine Holfeld	FDJ	
Horst Holinski	FDGB	
Witho Holland	LDPD	Berlin representative
Ilse Holtzbecher	CDU	
Heinrich Homann	NDPD	
Erich Honecker	SED	
Margot Honecker	SED	
Fritz Hopf	LDPD	
Heinz Hoßfeld	FDGB	
Claus Howitz	DBD	
Claus-Jürgen Huch	NDPD	
Max Hübner	FDGB	
Wilfried Ihle	FDGB	
Helene Ilse	FDGB	
Gisela Jänsch	SED	
Günther Jahn	FDJ	
Gudrun Jakob	FDJ	
Werner Jarowinsky	SED	
Christa Jauch	LDPD	
Hans Jendretzky	FDGB	
Hans-Rainer John	KB	Berlin representative
Hertha Jung	DFD	
Karl Kaatz	LDPD	
Erich Kärger	DBD	
Susanne Kahlert	DFD	
Siegfried Kaiser	FDGB	Berlin representative
Hermann Kalb	CDU	
Werner Kalweit	SED	
Susi Kammerath	SED	Berlin representative
Werner Karwath	CDU	
Karl Kayser	KB	
Ruth Kellermann	NDPD	
Katharina Kern	DFD	
Heinz Kessler	SED	
Wulf-Peter Keuerleber	FDJ	
Gustav Kiesewetter	LDPD	
Bruno Kiesler	SED	
Kurt Kieß	SED	deceased on December 30, 1970
Friedrich Kind	CDU	
Franz Kirchner	CDU	
Rudolf Kirchner	FDGB	
Ruth Kirsch	SED	
Hermann Kirschstein	FDGB	
Helmtraut Klara	DFD	Berlin representative
Günther Kleiber	SED	
Gottfried Klepel	CDU	
Heinz Kliemt	LDPD	on June 24, 1971, for Rep. Suhrbier moved up
Wilfried Klöser	FDGB	
Claus-Dieter Knöfler	LDPD	
Hans Koch	KB	
Michael Köhler	FDJ	
Erwin Körber	DBD	Berlin representative
Lothar Kolbe	CDU	
Willi-Peter Konzok	LDPD	
Edda Kramer	DFD	
Erwin Kramer	SED	
Klaus Kraßmann	NDPD	
Martin Kraul	KB	
Johanna Krause	DBD	
Otto Krauss	LDPD	deceased on May 1, 1971
Rosemarie Krautzig	CDU	Berlin representative
Kurt Krenz	SED	
Walter Kresse	SED	
Horst Kreter	NDPD	Berlin representative
Werner Krolikowski	SED	
Bernhard Kromolski	FDGB	Berlin representative
Karsta Krüger	FDJ	
Liesbeth Krüger	SED	Berlin representative
Franz Kühlmann	CDU	
Gerhard Kühn	LDPD	Berlin representative
Rudolf Kühn	FDJ	
Hermann Kühne	DBD	
Joachim Kuehne	FDGB	
Hanna Kuner	DFD	Berlin representative
Traude Kunz	SED	
Gerhard Kupke	SED	
Alfred Kurella	SED	
Hannelore Kutschenreuter	FDJ	
Inge Kutter	SED	
Ursula Kutzner	CDU	
Werner Lamberz	SED	
Heinz Landgraf	DBD	
Elfriede Lange	FDGB	
Gerhard Lange	CDU	
Ilse Lange	FDGB	
Ingeburg Lange	SED	
Wolfgang Lange	DBD	
Marga Legal	DFD	Berlin representative
Hannelore Lehmann	SED	
Harri Leupold	LDPD	Berlin representative
Walburga Liedler	DBD	Berlin representative
Gerhard Lindner	LDPD	
Horst Linke	DBD	
Ruth Lisofsky	FDGB	
Johannes Löhn	LDPD	
Jonny Löhr	NDPD	Berlin representative died on July 15, 1967
Günter Loose	SED	
Ilse Lorenz	DBD	
Siegfried Lorenz	FDJ	
Werner Lorenz	KB	
Gerhard Lotz	CDU	
Johanna Ludwig	NDPD	
Heinz Lüder	NDPD	
Wolfgang Lungershausen	SED	
Hans Luthardt	NDPD	
Paul Luzemann	FDGB	
Günter Mähl	NDPD	Berlin representative
Boto Märtin	DBD	
Hans-Jürgen Mannweiller	KB	
Hermann Matern	SED	deceased on January 24, 1971
Alfred Mattheß	FDGB	Berlin representative
Heinz Matthes	SED	
Günter Mauritz	SED	
Heinrich Meier	NDPD	
Hella Meier	FDJ	
Renate Meißner	NDPD	
Werner Mennicke	SED	
Else Merke	DBD	
Charlotte Mewes	DFD	
Gerhard Rudolf Meyer	KB	Berlin representative
Erich Mielke	SED	
Gudrun Miethig	CDU	
Günter Mittag	SED	
Lore Mix	DFD	
Hans Modrow	SED	Berlin representative
Siegfried Mohr	SED	on June 24, 1971, for Rep. Matern moved up
Hans-Dietrich Möller	NDPD	
Günter Morge	LDPD	
Helga Mucke-Wittbrodt	DFD	
Erich Mückenberger	SED	
Emma Müller	FDGB	
Gerhard Müller	NDPD	
Inge Müller	DFD	
Jochen Müller	FDJ	Berlin representative
Joachim Müller	FDGB	
Heinz Müller	SED	Berlin representative
Herbert Müller	DBD	
Margarete Müller	FDGB	
Margarete Müller	SED	
Walter Müller	SED	
Gerhard Münch	NDPD	
Harald Naumann	CDU	
Konrad Naumann	SED	Berlin representative
Gudrun Nause	DFD	
Wolfgang Neefe	NDPD	
Heinz Neukrantz	FDGB	
Alfred Neumann	SED	
Anni Neumann	FDGB	
Erika Neumann	FDGB	
Gisela Neumann	DFD	
Leane Neumann	FDJ	
Adolf Niggemeier	CDU	
Edeltraut Nitz	DBD	
Albert Norden	SED	
Rose Nyland-Distler	KB	
Herbert Ott	LDPD	
Friedrich Otto	NDPD	
Martha Pässold	DBD	
Walter Parey	FDGB	on June 24, 1971, for Rep. Geisler moved up
Heike Pemsel	CDU	
Hans Günter Petzold	CDU	Berlin representative
Susanne Pfannenberg	CDU	
Roland Pfeffer	NDPD	
Ludwig Pfeiffer	NDPD	
Paul Pflock	LDPD	
Waltraud Piehl	DFD	
Sieglinde Pietsch	DBD	
Alois Pisnik	SED	
Arthur Ploetz	SED	
Rolf Poche	SED	
Hans-Joachim Pohl	Culture Association	
Klaus Polifka	FDJ	
Rudolf Porschitz	NDPD	
Fritz Preller	FDGB	
Alois Proksch	CDU	
Margot Pschebizin	FDGB	
Otto Püllmann	LDPD	on September 24, 1969, for Rep. Dieckmann moved up
Wolfgang Pusch	FDJ	on May 12, 1969, for Rep. Scheyok moved up
Max Putze	SED	
Bernhard Quandt	SED	
Jürgen Quinger	FDJ	
Erich Rätsch	SED	
Helga Rateitzak	FDGB	
Wolfgang Rauchfuss	SED	
Helene Rausche	LDPD	
Eberhard Rebling	KB	Berlin representative
Johannes Rech	FDJ	faction leader
Herbert Recknagel	CDU	
Ursula Redel	FDJ	
Hans Reichelt	DBD	
Anni Rein	SED	
Manfred Rentsch	NDPD	
Fritz Rick	CDU	Berlin representative
Walter Riedel	CDU	
Karl Rieke	SED	
Hans Rietz	DBD	
Hans Rodenberg	SED	
Ilse Rodenberg	NDPD	Berlin representative
Fritz Rösel	FDGB	
Wolfgang Rösser	NDPD	
Paul Roscher	SED	
Marianne Roß	DBD	
Ewald Roßbach	DBD	
Harald Rost	SED	
Christian-Wilhelm Rowoldt	NDPD	
Dorothea Rudolph	NDPD	
Otto Rühle	NDPD	deceased on April 6, 1969
Heike Samland	CDU	
Christa Samrowski	FDJ	
Gertrud Sasse	LDPD	
Paul Saul	SED	
Lilli Schäfer	FDGB	
Willi Schäfer	DBD	
Peter Schejok	FDJ	Resignation of mandate on May 12, 1969
Horst Schewe	SED	
Waldemar Schilling	FDGB	
Gregor Schirmer	KB	
Wilhelmine Schirmer-Pröscher	DFD	
Liselotte Schlecht	SED	Berlin representative
Otto Schlegelmilch	FDGB	
Frank Schliephake	FDGB	
Paula Schlitter	DFD	
Ursula Schlosser	DFD	
Elfriede Schmidt	DFD	
Waldemar Schmidt	SED	Berlin representative
Maria Schneider	FDGB	
Bernhard Schnieber	CDU	
Karl-Heinz Schniebs	DBD	Berlin representative
Gerty Scholer	FDJ	
Otto Schön	SED	deceased on September 15, 1968
Edith Schoenfelder	FDJ	
Georg Scholz	LDPD	
Paul Scholz	DBD	
Erhard Schrader	DBD	
Max Schreiber	FDGB	
Bernd Schröder	FDJ	
Ingeborg Schubert	DFD	
Manfred Schubert	SED	
Gerhard Schürer	SED	
Hans Schuldt	CDU	
Karl-Heinz Schulmeister	KB	
Margarete Schulz	SED	Berlin representative
Rudolph Schulze	CDU	
Horst Schumann	SED	
Gustav-Adolf Schur	FDJ	
Erika Schweder	NDPD	
Max Sefrin	CDU	
Hans Seigewasser	SED	
Anneliese Seume	NDPD	
Max Seydewitz	SED	
Rolf Sieber	FDGB	
Heinz Siebert	DBD	
Gustav Siemon	NDPD	
Rosemarie Sievert	LDPD	
Hans-Heinrich Simon	NDPD	
Horst Sindermann	SED	
Erna Sirch	LDPD	
Heinz Sock	LDPD	
Winfried Sonntag	SED	
Klaus Sorgenicht	SED	
Osmar Spitzner	SED	deceased on November 24, 1969
Gerd Staegemann	NDPD	
Luitpold Steidle	CDU	
Manfred Steiner	DBD	
Ursula Steinert	CDU	
Werner Steuwer	LDPD	
Albert Stief	SED	
Willi Stoph	SED	
Paul Strauß	SED	
Hans Stubbe	KB	
Klaus-Dietrich Sturm	SED	on June 24, 1971, for Rep. Moved up happily
Max Suhrbier	LDPD	deceased on January 16, 1971
Siegfried Tannhäuser	SED	
Hannelore Templiner	FDGB	Berlin representative
Bruno Thalmann	LDPD	Berlin representative
Ilse Thiele	DFD	
Kurt Thieme	SED	Berlin representative
Liselotte Thoms-Heinrich	DFD	Berlin representative
Annelie Thorndike	KB	
Walter Thürmer	LDPD	died on February 24, 1971
Hans-Manfred Thurm	CDU	
Harry Tisch	SED	
Werner Titel	DBD	
Heinrich Toeplitz	CDU	
Gottfried Torbicki	NDPD	
Herbert Trebs	CDU	
Harry Trumpold	LDPD	
Fritz Tschetschorke	DBD	
Erich Uhlich	SED	MP until 1968
Walter Ulbricht	SED	
Paul Ullmann	CDU	
Hans Ulrich	NDPD	
Johannes Unger	FDGB	
Rolf Unger	LDPD	
Paul Verner	SED	
Ursula Völkner	DFD	
Anni Vogt	CDU	
Roland Voigtlander	DBD	
Gerhard Wagner	LDPD	
Herbert Walkowski	NDPD	on September 24, 1969, for Rep. Rühle moved up
Rosel Walther	NDPD	
Herbert Warnke	SED	
Irma Wattenbach	DFD	
Hans Watzek	DBD	
Christine Wedegärtner	FDJ	
Margit Wegener	NDPD	
Wolfgang Weichelt	SED	
Johannes Weidauer	NDPD	
Ingrid Weigelt	DFD	
Susanne Weigert	FDJ	
Marta Weigt	DFD	
Gerhard Weiss	SED	
Herbert Weiz	SED	
Regina Wenck	SED	Berlin representative
Ruth Wendt	SED	
Josef Wenig	FDGB	
Margaret Werner	SED	Berlin representative
Monika Werner	SED	
Rudi Werner	DBD	
Harald Werthmann	LDPD	Berlin representative
Günter Wiedemann	LDPD	
Hans Wiesner	SED	
Lothar Wilczek	CDU	
Karin-Christiane Wilhelm	CDU	
Richard O. Wilhelm	LDPD	
Lisbeth Windisch	DFD	
Otto Winzer	SED	
Irmgard Wisor	FDJ	
Lothar Witt	FDJ	Berlin representative
Karl-Heinz Wittig	NDPD	
Werner Wittig	SED	
Günter Wolf	FDGB	
Werner Wollschläger	FDJ	Berlin representative
Werner Wolter	DBD	
Kurt Wünsche	LDPD	
Werner Wünschmann	CDU	
Marianne Wunderlich	FDGB	
Günter Wutzler	KB	
Stephan Zagrodnik	DBD	
Gisela Zepp	DFD	
Herbert Ziegenhahn	SED	
Erwin Ziesmann	DBD	
Ute Zipfel	NDPD	
Friedrich Zirpel	LDPD	
Johann Zuber	FDGB	
Hermann Zweigler	LDPD	

== Literature ==
- Secretariat of the People's Chamber on behalf of the President of the People's Chamber of the GDR (Ed.) Die Volkskammer der Deutschen Demokratischen Republik: 5. Wahlperiode. Berlin, Staatsverlag der DDR, 1967.
- Günther Buch: Namen und Daten wichtiger Personen der DDR. 3rd revised and expanded edition. Dietz, Berlin (West)/Bonn 1982, ISBN 3-8012-0081-7.
