= List of members of the seventh Volkskammer =

This list provides an overview of all the members of the People's Chamber of the GDR in the 7th legislative period (1976–1981).

== Composition ==
In the 1976 Volkskammer election, according to official data, 99.86% of voters cast their votes in favor of the nomination proposed by the National Front.

Faction	Seats	by Party Affiliation
SED	127	
DBD	52	
CDU	52	
LDPD	52	
NDPD	52	
FDGB	68	–
DFD	35	–
FDJ	40	–
KB	22	–
Independent	–	
Total	500	500

The election did not influence the strength of the factions. Their sizes were predetermined. The party affiliations of the members of the FDGB, DFD, FDJ, and Kulturbund factions are reflected in the rightmost column of the above table.

== Presidium ==
- President of the People's Chamber
  Horst Sindermann (SED)
- Deputy President of the People's Chamber
  Friedrich Ebert (SED) deceased in 1979
  Gerald Götting (CDU) elected on July 3, 1980
- Members of the Presidium:
  Wolfgang Heyl (CDU)
  Erich Mückenberger (SED)
  Wilhelmine Schirmer-Pröscher (DFD)
  Heinz Eichler (SED)
  Karl-Heinz Schulmeister (KB)
  Willi-Peter Konzok (LDPD)
  Wolfgang Rösser (NDPD)
  Egon Krenz (FDJ)
  Hans Rietz (DBD)
  Johanna Töpfer (FDGB)

== Faction Leaders ==
- SED Faction
  Friedrich Ebert deceased in 1979
  Erich Mückenberger from 1979
- DBD Faction
  Leonhard Helmschrott
- CDU Faction
  Wolfgang Heyl
- LDPD Faction
  Rudolf Agsten
- NDPD Faction
  Siegfried Dallmann
- FDGB Faction
  Hans Jendretzky
- DFD Faction
  Katharina Kern
- FDJ Faction
  Günter Böhme
- KB Faction
  Karl-Heinz Schulmeister

== Deputies ==
Name	Faction	Remarks
Joseph Aberth	DBD	
Alexander Abusch	KB	
Rudolf Agsten	LDPD	faction leader
Lutz Ahnfeld	FDJ	
Erika Albrecht	FDGB	
Hans Albrecht	SED	
Kurt Anclam	LDPD	
Manfred von Ardenne	KB	
Otto Arndt	SED	
Elke Arnold	CDU	
Klaus-Rüdiger Arnold	FDGB	
Erhard Assmann	FDGB	
Hermann Axen	SED	
Wolfgang Baatz	CDU	
Heidi Bardölke	FDJ	
Helga Barsch	DFD	
Dieter Bartelt	SED	
Manfred Becher	DBD	
Edelgard Becker	DBD	
Christel Bednareck	FDGB	
Friedl Behnke	FDGB	
Bärbel Behrens	CDU	
Petra Belitz	FDGB	
Bruno Benthien	LDPD	
Wiete Bergmann	FDGB	
Kurt Bernheiden	NDPD	
Bernd Beyer	DBD	
Wolfgang Beyreuther	FDGB	
Ewald Bialas	FDGB	
Petra Biermann	FDJ	
Heinz Böhm	CDU	
Siegfried Böhm	SED	deceased on May 5, 1980
Günter Böhme	FDJ	faction leader
Reinhard Bolduan	SED	
Walter Boltz	DBD	
Lothar Bolz	NDPD	
Alois Bräutigam	SED	
Horst Brasch	SED	
Ellen Brombacher	FDJ	
Christoph Brückner	LDPD	
Günter Brust	LDPD	
Monika Buch	FDGB	
Hermann Budzislawski	FDGB	deceased on April 28, 1978
Kornelia Burigk	FDJ	
Lothar Burkhardt	SED	on October 13, 1978, for Rep. Lamberz moved up
Johannes Chemnitzer	SED	
Gerhard Claussner	SED	
Manfred Clauss	SED	
Erich Correns	KB	deceased on May 18, 1981
Ursula Czeczot	CDU	died on February 6, 1980
Georg Czerwenka	KB	
Siegfried Dallmann	NDPD	faction leader
Hans Deckert	NDPD	
Gerd Delenschke	NDPD	
Friedrich Dickel	SED	
Regine Dietze	FDGB	
Horst Döll	NDPD	
Horst Dohlus	SED	
Konrad Dorow	FDGB	
Heinz Dreblow	SED	
Gertraud Dreihardt	DFD	
Paul Eberle	LDPD	
Friedrich Ebert	SED	died on December 4, 1979; Deputy President of the People's Chamber
Harry Eckardt	FDGB	
Herbert Eichhorn	DBD	
Heinz Eichler	SED	Member of the Presidium of the People's Chamber
Ludwig Elm	KB	
Klaus Elsner	DBD	
Gottfried Engelmann	LDPD	
Albert Enke	FDGB	
Elisabeth Erdmann	NDPD	
Luise Ermisch	SED	
Heino Ernst	FDGB	
Manfred Ewald	SED	
Ulrich Fahl	CDU	
Heinz Fahrenkrog	FDGB	
Herbert Fechner	SED	
Werner Feist	LDPD	
Werner Felfe	SED	
Kurt Fenske	SED	
Ursula Fiebig	FDJ	
Otto Fiedler	DBD	
Horst Fischer	NDPD	
Oskar Fischer	SED	
Manfred Flegel	NDPD	
Peter Florin	SED	
Helga Freiberg	NDPD	
Heinz Freier	SED	
Ana-Maria Freyer	DFD	
Gisela Fuchs	DFD	
Friedel Fuckel	DFD	
Lisbeth Füßler	DBD	
Otto Funke	SED	
Uwe Gajewski	FDJ	
Heinz Gattung	FDGB	
Dieter Gaudian	SED	
Helmut Geiger	CDU	
Manfred Gerlach	LDPD	
Horst Gessner	LDPD	
Joachim-Ernst Gierspeck	LDPD	
Anita Gläser	FDGB	
Olga Glanz	LDPD	
Grete Glawe	FDGB	
Siegfried Glöckner	SED	
Gerald Götting	CDU	Deputy President of the People's Chamber
Ernst Goldenbaum	DBD	
Willi Grandetzka	DBD	deceased on April 14, 1979
Alfred Grandke	LDPD	
Liselotte Gretzschel	SED	died on October 28, 1976
Günther Grewe	CDU	
Roberta Gropper	FDGB	
Ines Grosche	CDU	
Manfred Grossmann	FDGB	
Gerhard Grüneberg	SED	deceased on April 10, 1981
Erich Grützner	SED	
Manfred Grund	LDPD	
Gabriele Günther	FDJ	
Klaus Gysi	KB	
Susanne Häber	DBD	
Hans Härtel	FDJ	
Anita Häußler	SED	
Kurt Hager	SED	
Erika Hahn	LDPD	
Ruth Hahn	DFD	
Walter Halbritter	SED	
Wolfram Haller	CDU	
Irmgard Haltinner	SED	
Sigrid Hamann	CDU	
Gero Hammer	NDPD	
Emmy Handke	DFD	
George Handrick	SED	on April 7, 1977, for Dept. Gretzschel moved up
Brunhilde Hanke	SED	
Martin Hanke	SED	
Siegfried Hanusch	FDGB	
Gertrud Hartmann	DBD	
Günter Hartmann	NDPD	
Walter Hartung	NDPD	
Thea Hauschild	SED	
Horst Heinrich	NDPD	
Horst Heintze	FDGB	
Günther Heinze	FDGB	
Gerda Heller	LDPD	
Leonhard Helmschrott	DBD	faction leader
Klara Helmtraut	DFD	
Egon Hengelhaupt	FDGB	
Karlheinz Hengst	NDPD	
Waltraut Hennig	LDPD	
Anneliese Hennlich	CDU	
Johannes Herda	CDU	
Lieselott Herforth	FDGB	
Wolfgang Herger	FDJ	
Erhard Herrmann	FDJ	
Joachim Herrmann	SED	
Hans-Joachim Hertwig	SED	
Edith Herzig	DBD	
Hans-Joachim Heusinger	LDPD	
Wolfgang Heyl	CDU	Group Chairman; Member of the Presidium of the People's Chamber
Wolfgang Hinz	DBD	
Heino Hinze	KB	
Annelotte Hochhaus	DFD	
Martina Hönicke	FDGB	
Friedrich Höpfner	LDPD	
Elisabeth Höpner	FDGB	
Rudolf Höppner	FDGB	
Ruth Höwe	DBD	
Anni Hoffmann	SED	
Hans-Joachim Hoffmann	KB	
Heinz Hoffmann	SED	
Heinz-Rudolf Hoffmann	CDU	deceased on November 2, 1978
Erna Hofmann	FDGB	
Heinz Hofmann	KB	Berlin representative on October 13, 1978, for the deputy G. R. Meyer moved up
Sabine Hofmann	FDGB	
Christa Hojer	CDU	
Witho Holland	LDPD	
Gerhard Holtz-Baumert	KB	
Heinrich Homann	NDPD	
Erich Honecker	SED	
Margot Honecker	SED	
Horst Hornung	FDGB	
Heinz Hoßfeld	FDGB	
Claus Howitz	DBD	
Claus-Jürgen Huch	NDPD	
Max Hübner	FDGB	
Helga Isenberg	LDPD	
Barbara Jacob	FDGB	
Karl Jäger	DBD	
Bernhard Jahn	LDPD	
Günther Jahn	SED	
Werner Jarowinsky	SED	
Christa Jauch	LDPD	
Hans Jendretzky	FDGB	faction leader
Ulrike Jereschinski	NDPD	
Hertha Jung	DFD	
Wolfgang Junker	SED	
Ingeborg Kachel	FDGB	
Erich Kärger	DBD	
Susanne Kahlert	DFD	
Elfi Kaiser	CDU	
Siegfried Kaiser	FDGB	
Hermann Kalb	CDU	
Werner Kalweit	SED	
Susi Kammerath	SED	
Werner Karwath	CDU	
Christa Kaufhold	CDU	on July 3, 1980, for Dept. Hired up
Karl Kayser	KB	
Willi Keindorf	SED	
Katharina Kern	DFD	faction leader
Doris Kersten	DFD	
Heinz Keßler	SED	
Bruno Kiesler	SED	
Friedrich Kind	CDU	
Werner Kirchhoff	SED	
Franz Kirchner	CDU	
Ruth Kirsch	SED	
Ronald Kirschner	FDJ	
Günther Kleiber	SED	
Helmut Klein	SED	
Volker Klemm	NDPD	
Gottfried Klepel	CDU	
Eveline Klett	DFD	
Marianne Klettke	FDJ	
Heinz Kliemt	LDPD	
Wilfried Klöser	FDGB	
Lucie Knobloch	DBD	
Claus-Dieter Knöfler	LDPD	
Heinz Knorr	NDPD	
Hans Koch	KB	
Karin König	NDPD	
Erwin Körber	DBD	
Lothar Kolbe	CDU	died on February 7, 1979
Elvira Kollatz	FDJ	
Willi-Peter Konzok	LDPD	Member of the Presidium of the People's Chamber
Michael Koplanski	DBD	
Dorothea Kowalski	FDJ	
Erhard Krack	SED	
Edda Kramer	DFD	
Erwin Kramer	SED	deceased on November 10, 1979
Heinz Kratkey	NDPD	
Gerhard Krause	FDGB	on October 13, 1978, for Rep. Budzislawski moved up
Rosemarie Krautzig	CDU	
Heiderose Kreisel	LDPD	
Egon Krenz	FDJ	Member of the Presidium of the People's Chamber
Kurt Krenz	SED	deceased on November 23, 1978
Walter Kresse	SED	
Horst Kreter	NDPD	
Waldemar Kreutzberger	NDPD	
Werner Krolikowski	SED	
Liesbeth Krüger	SED	
Eleonore Kucharczyk	DBD	
Dietmar Küchler	FDJ	
Hermann Kühne	DBD	
Heinz Kuhrig	SED	
Traude Kunz	SED	
Gerhard Kupke	SED	
Ingrid Kurzke	SED	
Ursula Kutzner	CDU	
Helga Labs	FDJ	
Werner Lamberz	SED	deceased March 6, 1978; Helicopter crash in Libya
Elfriede Lange	FDGB	
Ilse Lange	FDGB	
Ingeburg Lange	SED	
Renate Lausch	FDJ	
Ursula Lebelt	DBD	
Wolfgang Lesser	KB	
Harri Leupold	LDPD	
Helmut Liebert	FDGB	
Dagmar Liebscher	NDPD	
Gustav Liepack	SED	on October 13, 1978, for Rep. Rodenberg moved up
Gerhard Lindner	LDPD	
Elke Löbl	FDGB	
Siegfried Löffler	CDU	
Johannes Löhn	LDPD	
Erhard Lonscher	NDPD	
Siegfried Lorenz	SED	
Werner Lorenz	KB	
Johanna Ludwig	NDPD	
Heinz Lüder	NDPD	
Wolfgang Lungershausen	SED	
Martin Maaßen	LDPD	
Günter Mähl	NDPD	
Paul Markowski	SED	Berlin representative died on March 6, 1978; Helicopter crash in Libya
Roland Materna	DBD	on December 21, 1979, for Rep. Grandetzka moved up
Heinz Matthes	SED	
Ernst Mecklenburg	DBD	
Heidemarie Mehnert	SED	
Heinrich Meier	NDPD	
Rosemarie Meier	FDGB	
Jürgen Meißner	DBD	
Werner Mennicke	SED	
Else Merke	DBD	
Sieglinde Metten	LDPD	
Gerhard Rudolf Meyer	KB	died on October 24, 1977
Gottfried Meyer	CDU	
Erich Mielke	SED	
Gudrun Miethig	CDU	resigned on July 3, 1980
Günter Mittag	SED	
Hartmut Mitzenheim	CDU	
Hans Modrow	SED	
Annegret Möller	FDGB	
Hans-Dietrich Möller	NDPD	
Günter Morge	LDPD	
Helga Mucke-Wittbrodt	DFD	
Erich Mückenberger	SED	from 1979 parliamentary group leader member of the Presidium of the People's Chamber
Manfred Mühlmann	NDPD	
Anita Müller	FDGB	
Emma Müller	FDGB	
Inge Müller	DFD	
Margarete Müller	FDGB	
Margarete Müller	SED	
Gerhard Münch	NDPD	
Karl-Heinz Nadler	SED	
Gerd Natschinski	LDPD	
Harald Naumann	CDU	
Konrad Naumann	SED	
Wolfgang Naumann	NDPD	
Gudrun Nause	DFD	
Heinz Neukrantz	FDGB	
Alfred Neumann	SED	
Anni Neumann	FDGB	
Gisela Neumann	DFD	
Sigrid Neumann	SED	
Karlheinz Niedermeier	FDGB	
Adolf Niggemeier	CDU	
Rolf Noack	DBD	
Walter Nörenberg	LDPD	
Albert Norden	SED	
Friedrich Otto	NDPD	
Engelbert Pade	FDGB	
Werner Pagel	CDU	
Antje Pappe	FDJ	
Walter Parey	FDGB	
Marga Paulitschke	DFD	
Heike Pemsel	CDU	
Hans-Günter Petzold	CDU	
Friedrich Pfaffenbach	NDPD	
Ludwig Pfeiffer	NDPD	
Alfons Piatkowski	DBD	
Renate Pischel	DBD	
Alois Pisnik	SED	
Rolf Poche	SED	
Wilma Podewin	KB	
Horst Pommerenk	LDPD	
Manfred Poneß	LDPD	
Eberhard Poppe	KB	
Rudolf Porschitz	NDPD	
Alois Proksch	CDU	
Margot Pschebizin	FDGB	
Max Putze	SED	
Bernhard Quandt	SED	
Detlef Radke	FDGB	
Claus Rank	DBD	
Sieglinde Rappsilber	FDGB	
Helga Rateitzak	FDGB	
Wolfgang Rauchfuss	SED	
Eberhard Rebling	KB	
Horst Rehtanz	FDGB	
Hans Reichelt	DBD	
Regine Reichhardt	DFD	
Ute Reiher	FDGB	
Rainer Reisner	FDJ	
Manfred Rentsch	NDPD	
Heike Richter	FDJ	
Brunhilde Rienecker	DFD	
Hans Rietz	DBD	Member of the Presidium of the People's Chamber
Renate Ritter	DBD	
Hans Rodenberg	SED	deceased on March 7, 1978
Ilse Rodenberg	NDPD	
Fritz Rösel	FDGB	
Wolfgang Rösser	NDPD	Member of the Presidium of the People's Chamber
Doris Röwe	FDJ	
Alfred Rohde	SED	
Jürgen Roloff	SED	
Paul Roscher	SED	
Karla Rose	CDU	
Marianne Roß	DBD	
Harald Rost	SED	
Jutta Rupprich	FDJ	
Anneliese Sälzler	KB	
Franz-Josef Salbreiter	CDU	
Gertrud Sasse	LDPD	
Paul Saul	SED	
Elfriede Schindler	NDPD	
Gregor Schirmer	KB	
Wilhelmine Schirmer-Pröscher	DFD	Member of the Presidium of the People's Chamber
Susanne Schlemm	FDJ	
Ursula Schlosser	DFD	
Anneliese Schmidt	DFD	
Gerhard Schmidt	DBD	
Ursula Schmiedel	FDJ	
Erhard Schnarrer	LDPD	
Burkhard Schneeweiß	CDU	
Dorothea Schneider	CDU	on July 3, 1980, for Dept. Czeczot moved up
Horst Schönfelder	CDU	on June 28, 1979, for Rep. Kolbe moved up
Wolfgang Schönfeldt	FDJ	
Paul Scholz	DBD	
Walter Scholz	SED	
Max Schreiber	FDGB	
Ingeborg Schubert	DFD	
Kurt Schubert	NDPD	
Manfred Schubert	SED	
Winfried Schubert	FDJ	
Gerhard Schürer	SED	
Karl-Heinz Schulmeister	KB	Group Chairman; Member of the Presidium of the People's Chamber
Joachim Schultz	NDPD	
Gudrun Schulz	LDPD	
Rudolph Schulze	CDU	
Horst Schumann	SED	
Gustav-Adolf Schur	SED	
Erika Schweder	NDPD	
Ekkehard Schweitzer	NDPD	
Max Sefrin	CDU	
Kristine Sehl	FDJ	
Werner Seifert	DBD	
Hans Seigewasser	SED	died on October 18, 1979
Max Seydewitz	SED	
Rosemarie Sievert	LDPD	
Käte Sima	FDJ	
Hans-Heinrich Simon	NDPD	
Horst Sindermann	SED	
Rudolf Singer	SED	deceased on November 1, 1980
Willi Sitte	KB	
Günther Skrzypek	SED	on July 3, 1980, for Rep. Ebert moved up
Werner Skunde	DBD	
Ilona Slupianek	FDJ	
Heinz Sock	LDPD	
Reinhard Sommer	FDGB	
Klaus Sorgenicht	SED	
Roland Spiegel	SED	on July 3, 1980, for Rep. Seigewasser moved up
Gerhard Springer	LDPD	
Siegfried Stabe	SED	on July 3, 1980, for Rep. Kramer moved up
Gerd Staegemann	NDPD	
Otfried Steger	SED	
Karl-Hermann Steinberg	CDU	
Manfred Steiner	DBD	
Albert Stief	SED	
Willi Stoph	SED	
Paul Strauß	SED	
Hans Stubbe	KB	
Rita Szidzick	SED	
Siegfried Tannhäuser	SED	
Ilse Thiele	DFD	
Gerda Thielemann	SED	
Kurt Thieme	SED	
Wolfgang Thieme	CDU	
Klaus-Dieter Thiemes	DBD	
Evelyn Thoese	FDJ	
Guido Thoms	SED	
Lieselotte Thoms-Heinrich	DFD	
Hans-Manfred Thurm	CDU	
Ernst Timm	SED	
Harry Tisch	SED	
Johanna Töpfer	FDGB	Member of the Presidium of the People's Chamber
Rosemarie Töpfer	DFD	
Heinrich Toeplitz	CDU	
Hannelore Tomaschek	CDU	
Gottfried Torbicki	NDPD	
Renate Triebel	DFD	
Harry Trumpold	LDPD	
Fritz Tschetschorke	DBD	
Dietrich Unangst	NDPD	
Johannes Unger	FDGB	
Rolf Unger	LDPD	
Paul Verner	SED	
Renate Viehrig	FDJ	
Ursula Völkner	DFD	
Anni Vogt	CDU	
Ellen Voigt	FDGB	
Dietrich Voigtberger	CDU	
Roland Voigtländer	DBD	
Rudolf Wabersich	DBD	
Werner Walde	SED	
Erika Waldhauer	FDGB	
Hans Waldmann	SED	
Rosel Walther	NDPD	
Albert Wappler	FDGB	
Hans Watzek	DBD	
Wolfgang Weichelt	SED	
Johannes Weidauer	NDPD	
Marta Weigt	DFD	
Margot Weilert	SED	
Rainer Weinitschke	FDJ	
Gerhard Weiss	SED	
Wilhelm Weißgärber	DBD	
Herbert Weiz	SED	
Charlotte Welm	FDGB	
Gert Wendelborn	CDU	
Ruth Wendt	SED	
Josef Wenig	FDGB	
Karl-Heinz Werner	DBD	
Monika Werner	SED	
Harald Werthmann	LDPD	
Gerolf Wetzel	DBD	
Ruth Weyh	LDPD	
Günter Wiedemann	LDPD	
Gerda Wiefel	SED	on June 28, 1979, for Rep. K. Krenz moved up
Hans Wiesner	SED	
Christine Wieynk	CDU	
Karin-Christiane Wilhelm	CDU	
Richard O. Wilhelm	LDPD	
Egon Winkelmann	SED	Berlin representative on December 15, 1978, for the deputy Markowski moved up
Ingeborg Wötzel	DFD	
Manfred Wolf	FDGB	
Lothar Wolter	LDPD	
Ingrid Wünsche	FDJ	
Werner Wünschmann	CDU	
Stephan Zagrodnik	DBD	
Gisela Zepp	DFD	
Herbert Ziegenhahn	SED	
Heinz Ziegner	SED	
Brigitte Zenert	DFD	
Günter Zierold	FDGB	
Johannes Zillig	CDU	on June 28, 1979, for Rep. MR. Hoffmann moved up
Christel Zillmann	FDJ	
Jörg Zirzow	FDJ	
Dieter Zwahr	LDPD	
Hermann Zweigler	LDPD	

Content in this edit is translated from the existing German Wikipedia article at de:Liste der Mitglieder der Volkskammer der DDR (7. Wahlperiode); see its history for attribution.

== Sources ==
- Secretariat of the People's Chamber on behalf of the President of the People's Chamber of the GDR (ed.): "The People's Chamber of the German Democratic Republic: 7th electoral period". State publishing house of the GDR, Berlin 1977.
