= Titel (disambiguation) =

Titel is a town and municipality in Serbia

Titel may also refer to:

- Titel Hill, a loess hillock situated in the Vojvodina province, Serbia
- Constantin Titel Petrescu, a Romanian politician and lawyer
- Werner Titel (1931-1971), German politician

== See also ==
- Title
