= Gustav Siemon =

German politician

- Born: 20 June 1918; Lippoldsberg, Hesse-Nassau, Germany
- Died: 17 January 2011 (aged 92); Berlin, Germany
- Occupations: Politician; Newspaper editor
- Political party: KPD; SED; NDPD

Gustav Siemon (20 June 1918 – 17 January 2011) was a German politician. At a national level he was a member of the East German National legislature (Volkskammer). Regionally, he led the National Democratic Party (NPDP) in Mecklenburg.

Between 1955 and 1961 Siemon was the chief editor of a national newspaper.

== Life ==
Gustav Siemon was born into a working-class family in a small town near Kassel during the closing months of the war. Between 1932 and 1935 he undertook an apprenticeship in the book trade, in which he subsequently worked. On 1 October 1936 he signed up for military service as a Luftwaffe pilot. War restarted in 1939 and Siemon served his country as a pilot, which for him included reconnaissance missions. By December 1942 he had risen to the rank of Oberleutnant. He was now shot down and started a new life as a Prisoner of war, captured by the Soviets. During the next few years he was detained in camps at Krasnogorsk, Oranki, Yelabuga, Lunjovo and others. During his time in detention Siemon joined the (Soviet sponsored) National Committee for a Free Germany (NKFD) in July 1943 and in September 1943 he was a founder member of the German Officers' League, effectively an organisation similar in its objectives to the NKFD (with which it would later be merged), but one targeted directly on members of the "officer classes" among the German prisoners of war held by the Soviets.

The war ended in May 1945. Many German prisoners of war held by the victorious powers would not be released back to Germany for one or two years, but Gustav Siemon was back in what remained of Germany on 26 May 1945: this was barely three weeks after the arrival in Berlin of the thirty man Ulbricht team had launched the implementation phase in a nation building exercise that would lead to the creation, formally in October 1949, of the German Democratic Republic. Siemon returned not to his home district but to Mecklenburg in the northern third of what was now designated as the Soviet occupation zone. The Ulbricht Team had split into three sub-groups based respectively in Berlin, Dresden and Mecklenburg: in Mecklenburg Siemon was now co-opted to work with Gustav Sobottka, who was the senior Ulbricht team member responsible in the northern part of the Soviet administered zone. The end of the war had marked the end of the Nazi regime and with it, as it seemed, the end of one-party government in Germany. In July 1945 Gustav Siemon became a member of the (no longer illegal) Communist Party (KPD). Following the contentious merger, in the Soviet controlled zone, of the KPD and SPD, this made him a member of the Socialist Unity Party (SED / Sozialistische Einheitspartei Deutschlands) after April 1946. He also joined the national Trade Union Federation and of the national Cultural Association (Kulturbund). He was also appointed, in July 1945, a member of the Mecklenburg Regional Administration and tasked with forming a department for culture in the regional ministry for education. In 1947 he joined the newly formed Society for the Study of Soviet Culture (Gesellschaft zum Studium der Kultur der Sowjetunion), renamed in 1949 and better remembered subsequently as the Society for German–Soviet Friendship.

In June 1948 he was a co-founder, in Mecklenburg, of a new political party, the National Democratic Party (NDPD / National-Demokratische Partei Deutschlands). It might have seemed strange that at a time when the Soviet occupation zone was in the process of reverting to one-party government, there should be space for a new political party, but it was explained that the NDPD would provide a political outlet for groups that had been attracted by the Nazi Party before 1945, such as military men and some of the middle classes. The Hitler regime had achieved one-party dictatorship by banning all political parties except for one. The Ulbricht regime would achieve one-party dictatorship by arranging for the ruling party to control the opposition parties. The alternative left wing party had been neutered through incorporation into the newly merged SED (party), which would control the remaining opposition parties using an organisational structure called the National Front. Existing opposition parties of the centre and moderate right, notably the Liberal Democrats (LDPD) and Christian Democrats (CDU) had their roots in the pre-1933 democratic constitution of Weimar period and during the later 1940s strongly resisted their reinvention as National Front controlled "Bloc parties". Their new sister party, the NDPD, founded by Gustav Siemon and his comrades, had no historical democratic roots. In terms of electoral credentials, the country's "Single list" voting system ensured that the ruling SED (party) won the electoral support from more than 99% of those voting in every general election between 1950 and 1986. The opposition parties were nevertheless assured of their place in the system through the allocation of a pre-determined quota of seats in the National Legislature (Volkskammer). Between June 1948 and 1952 Gustav Siemon was the Political Director and Deputy Chairman of the NDPD in Mecklenburg. At the national level, between 1948 and 1989 he was a member of the NDPD Central Committee. In 1948/49 he also sat for his new party as a member of the German People's Council (Volksrat), the precursor body for the new country's National Legislature (Volkskammer).

Siemon sat as an NDPD member of the Volkskammer from the foundation of East Germany (in 1949) till 1973/74. Between 1954 and 1958 he was a member of its Election Verification Committee and from 1958 till 1963 a member of the Standing Committee on General Affairs. From 1967 till 1973 he chaired the Volkskammer Credentials Committee and he was also, during this period, deputy leader of the NDPD group in the chamber. From 1949 till 1958 he served as a member of the National Council of the East German National Front In Mecklenburg he served as vice president of the city's Chamber of Industry and Commerce from 1948, becoming president in 1950/51. During this period he also undertook a correspondence degree course with the Potsdam based "Walter Ulbricht" Academy for Statecraft and Law between 1951 and 1954, ending up with a degree in political sciences. From 1952 he was also director of the NDPD's regional party academy at Grambow (Schwerin).

In 1955 Gustav Siemon succeeded Reinhold Hennig as the editor in chief of the Berlin-based National-Zeitung. The National Zeitung, founded in 1948, was the NDPD official newspaper. Despite that status, however, the NDPD had never had the opportunity to build a following across the country and circulation volumes were always modest. The job went with membership of the main board of the national Union of Journalists. Siemon relinquished the editorship in 1961.Between 1961 and 1963 he led the International Affairs Department of the NDPD Party Executive. Various further high level jobs within the party nationally followed through the 1960s and early 1970s after which his focus switched to regional politics. From 1982 till January 1984 he was chairman of the NDPD regional leadership in Cottbus. On 10 January 1984 he became deputy chairman of the Cottbus regional executive of the Society for German–Soviet Friendship and a Cottbus local councillor.

== Awards and honours ==
- National Front Badge of honour
- East German Order of Merit
- 1957: Patriotic Order of Merit in bronze
- 1958: Ernst Moritz Arndt Medal
- 1958: Party Medal of the NDPD
- 1965: Patriotic Order of Merit in silver
- 1978: Banner of Labor
- 1983: Patriotic Order of Merit in gold
- 1988: Patriotic Order of Merit gold clasp
