= Alfred Kurella =

German writer and cultural functionary (1895–1975)

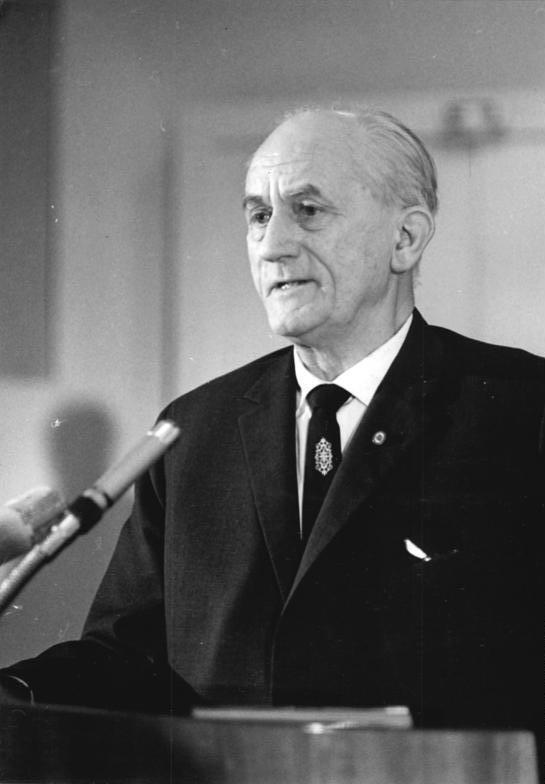
Kurella (1966).

Alfred Kurella (2 May 1895 – 12 June 1975) was a German writer and cultural functionary of the Socialist Unity Party of Germany (SED) in East Germany.

== Family ==
Alfred Kurella's father was the psychoanalyst who introduced Cesare Lombroso to Germany, while his mother translated Lombroso's daughter, Gina.

== Early years ==
Kurella was born in Brieg, Silesia. He was son of the doctor and psychiatrist Hans Kurella. He studied painting and graphics at the Königliche Kunstgewerbeschule München. Kurella volunteered in the army in 1914 but was demobilized a year later. After his return, he worked as a teacher and journalist in left-wing newspapers.

== Career ==
In 1918, he became a member of the German Communist Party, met Lenin in 1919 and became a member of the Communist Party of the Soviet Union and of the Comintern.

Kurella began living in Moscow in spring 1934 and began writing for the Deutsche Zentral Zeitung in 1935. In 1937, Kurella became a Soviet citizen and in 1943 was involved in the activity of the antinazi Committee for Free Germany. His brother, Heinrich Kurella, also in exile in the Soviet Union, was arrested by the NKVD during the Great Purge and was executed. In 1954, Kurella returned to East Germany and became a member of the ideological committee of the ruling Socialist Unity Party of Germany (SED).

== Death ==
His ashes were interred in the Memorial of the Socialists in the Friedrichsfelde Central Cemetery in Berlin-Lichtenberg.

== Awards and decorations ==
- Order of Karl Marx (1961)
- National Prize of the German Democratic Republic (1969)
- Cultural Award of the Free German Trade Union Federation and Free German Youth (1970)
- Honour Clasp to the Patriotic Order of Merit
