= Werner Titel =

East German politician (1931–1971)

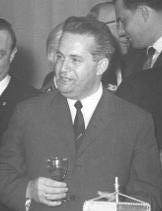
- Titel in 1968

Deputy Chairman of the Council of Ministers
- In office 14 July 1967 – 25 December 1971
- Chairman: Willi Stoph
- Preceded by: Paul Scholz
- Succeeded by: Hans Reichelt

Minister for Environmental Protection and Water Management
- In office 29 November 1971 – 25 December 1971
- Chairman of the Council of Ministers: Willi Stoph
- Preceded by: Position established
- Succeeded by: Hans Reichelt
Volkskammer
Member of the Volkskammer for Angermünde, Eberswalde-Land, Bad Freienwalde, Seelow, Eisenhüttenstadt-Land
In office 14 July 1967 – 25 December 1971
Preceded by	multi-member district
Succeeded by	Max Hüniger

Personal details
- Born: Werner Titel; 2 May 1931 Arnswalde, Province of Pomerania, Free State of Prussia, Weimar Republic (now Choszczno, Poland)
- Died: 25 December 1971 (aged 40) East Berlin, East Germany
- Resting place: Friedrichsfelde Central Cemetery
- Party: Democratic Farmers' Party of Germany (1950–1971)
- Education: Institut für Agrarökonomie (Dipl. agr. oec.); Humboldt University of Berlin (Dr. rer. oec.)
- Occupation: Politician; Party Functionary; Farmworker
- Awards: Patriotic Order of Merit

Werner Titel (2 May 1931 – 25 December 1971) was an East German politician and party functionary of the Democratic Farmers' Party of Germany (DBD).

He emerged as an early expert on environmental policy, eventually leading him to be appointed the East Germany's first Minister for the Environment. However, Titel died under unexplained circumstances shortly afterwards at the age of 40, after the Stasi discovered that Titel had concealed his father's crimes against humanity as an SS officer.

== Life and career ==
=== Early career ===
Werner Titel was born in Arnswalde (then part of the Prussian Province of Pomerania) on 2 May 1931 to a working-class family. He attended elementary and secondary school before being forcibly resettled to the Soviet occupation zone after the war. Titel completed an agricultural apprenticeship from 1946 to 1950 and attended the agricultural school in Zossen. In 1949, while working as a farm laborer, he joined the Free German Trade Union Federation (FDGB) and the Free German Youth (FDJ).

In 1950, he moved to Frankfurt (Oder) to work as an agricultural research technician in Frankfurt (Oder), additionally joining the Democratic Farmers' Party of Germany (DBD), an East German bloc party founded on the instigation of and beholden to the ruling Socialist Unity Party (SED). He became a full-time party functionary of the DBD the next year, working for the DBD on youth issues, from 1951 to 1953 for the Brandenburg DBD and later the party as a whole. He additionally was a member of the Central Council of the FDJ from 1953 to 1955.

During this time, he began working as an unofficial collaborator (IM) of the Stasi, codenamed "Lehmann", spying on his own party.

=== Bloc party politician ===
From 1956 to 1961, he attended a distance learning program at the Institute for Agricultural Economics in Bernburg (Saale), which he completed a with a degree in agricultural economics (Dipl. agr. oec.). In 1965, he earned a doctorate in economics (Dr. rer. oec.) from the Humboldt University of Berlin on the topic of agricultural problems in Comecon and the EEC.

In May 1963, at the VII. Party Congress of the DBD, he was elected to the presidium of the DBD party executive committee. From 1963 to 1966, he was chairman of the Bezirk Frankfurt (Oder) DBD, a member of the Bezirk agricultural council, a Bezirk assembly representative and from 1966 to 1967, a member of the Bezirk government. From 1966 to 1967, he also served as secretary of the DBD party executive committee.

In July 1967, he was made Deputy Chairman of the Council of Ministers of East Germany, responsible for agriculture and water management, succeeding his party colleague Paul Scholz. He additionally became member of the Volkskammer that year, nominally representing a rural constituency in the northeast of Bezirk Frankfurt (Oder).

Between October 1967 and September 1968, he led a working group of 21 researchers who presented a 118-page scientific analysis on environmental hazards in the GDR as part of the "Forecast on the Planned Development of Socialist National Culture." The GDR subsequently groomed him as an expert in environmental policy.

=== Death ===
When he was about to be appointed the first East German Environmental Minister in 1971, the Stasi discovered during the appointment process that Titel had concealed in his personnel records that his father had been sentenced to death in 1948 as a former SS officer for crimes against humanity.

Shortly after the Stasi then urged the DBD leadership to take personnel actions against Titel, he died under unexplained circumstances in the morning hours of 25 December 1971 at the age of 40, officially succumbing to a sudden, severe heart attack. According to historian Tobias Huff, who published an environmental history of East Germany in 2015, Titel died of a rare heart disease.

He was buried in the Friedrichsfelde Central Cemetery in Berlin. Hans Reichelt succeeded him both as Minister for Environmental Protection and Water Management and as the DBD's Deputy Chairman of the Council of Ministers.
