= Helga Mucke-Wittbrodt =

German physician (1910–1999)

Helga Mucke-Wittbrodt (née Nydahl; 11 September 1910 – 4 May 1999) was a German physician for nearly forty years. She was the medical director at the East German Government Hospital. In connection with this, for forty years she was a member of the National legislature ("Volkskammer"), representing not a political party but the Democratic Women's League ("Demokratischer Frauenbund Deutschlands" / DFD). Although her medical abilities were evidently well attested, the length of her tenure at the hospital and the number of national honours that she accumulated over the years indicate that she was also highly prized by the authorities for her discretion and "political reliability".

Many sources use her double family name "Mucke-Wittbrodt" which incorporates the names of her first and second husbands. However, some sources identify her simply as Helga Wittbrodt.

== Life ==
Helga Nydahl was born in Altona, at that time (and until 1938), a resolutely independent city directly to the west of Hamburg (into which it has subsequently been subsumed). Jens Nydahl, her father, was a teacher and education reformer who after 1945 became a district mayor in the Tempelhof quarter of Berlin. Her father became a school inspector in 1919 and in 1921, the family relocated to Berlin when he was appointed to a senior role (" Dezernent für das Volksschulwesen") in the national school administration. It was therefore in Berlin, at the girl's lyceum (secondary school) that she passed her school final exams (Abitur which opened the way to a university level education. In 1929 she embarked on her medical studies, still in Berlin. In 1936 she passed her state medical exams and received her doctorate (in medicine).

Even before embarking on her medical studies Helga Nydahl joined the Young Socialists ("Sozialistische Arbeiter-Jugend" / SAJ) in 1928. The SAJ was in effect the youth wing of the Social Democratic Party ("Sozialdemokratische Partei Deutschlands" / SPD) of which her increasingly political father was already a member, and which she herself had joined by 1933.

Between 1936 and 1945 she worked her way up through the hospital system, identified variously a volunteer, helper and assistant doctor. In 1943 she was appointed senior doctor and specialist internist at Berlin's "Urban Hospital" ("Urban-Krankenhaus"). Meanwhile, through her second marriage, to the scientist Hans Wittbrodt, towards the end of the 1930s she came into contact with the resistance movement. She was able to help victims of government persecution by falsifying medical certificates.

Military defeat in May 1945 put an end to the Nazi régime. A large region surrounding Berlin and the eastern part of the city itself were now administered as the Soviet occupation zone. Between 1945 and 1948 Helga Wittbrodt was employed as a senior doctor, and then as head doctor, at the "Urban" City Hospital in Berlin's Tempelhof quarter (in the "American sector" of Berlin).

In 1945 she joined the Communist Party (KPD), and in April 1946 she was among the thousands of communists who lost no time in signing their party membership across to the new Socialist Unity Party ("Sozialistische Einheitspartei Deutschlands" / SED), which by October 1949 would have become the ruling party in a new kind of German one- party dictatorship. Between 1946 and 1948 she also represented the KPD/SED party on the Berlin city council ("Stadtverordnetenversammlung"). In 1948 she was dismissed from her position at the "Urban Hospital" ("Urban-Krankenhaus"). The division of Berlin into military occupation zones agreed in 1945 was by now acquiring a level of permanence that few would have anticipated three years earlier, and she now relocated from the American occupation zone to the Soviet occupation zone, taking a post as a senior internist at the Charité (hospital). Her move was attributed, by the West German pro-Western news magazine, Der Spiegel, to "Communist activities" ("Wegen Kommunistischer Umtriebe").

Bernd Brückner was Erich Honecker's personal body guard for thirteen years. Later he wrote a memoire, in which he recalled two of the doctors who had looked after his boss. Of Helga Wittbrodt he writes:

"I found her an agreeable, modest but at the same time self-confident character, who carried out her work with supreme calm. No question of some overbearing semi-divinity in a white coat."

"Ich empfand sie als eine angenehme, bescheidene und zugleich selbstbewusste Persönlichkeit, die mit soveräner Gelassenheit auftrat. Kein Halb-oder Ganzgott im weissem Kittel."

In October 1949 she was appointed head doctor and director at the East German government hospital. This establishment, which had been adapted from an existing military hospital along the Scharnhorst Street that had been used, most recently, by the Soviet army, played no role in the hospitals infrastructure of Berlin. It was reserved for senior members of the East German government. For the next forty years there would be rumours and reports (appearing outside East Germany) that its patients enjoyed a superior quality of treatment, with access to drugs from the west not normally made available for treating East German patients and even, as they recovered, access to West German newspapers. It was also noted that patients at the government hospital seemed never to die: in reality, when they did die, the bodies were removed using a well concealed entrance at the back of the building, far from prying eyes. When, unavoidably, patients died under circumstances that might embarrass the authorities, the hospital was able to put an appropriate gloss on the event. The suicide in 1965 of Dr. Erich Apel, head of the state planning commission, was reported by the hospital in a bulletin signed by its medical director, the party-loyalist Helga Wittbrot as a "short-circuit reaction" caused by "nervous overload" ("Kurzschlußreaktion [infolge] nervlicher Überlastung"). She remained in post for a couple of years before she died.

Mucke-Wittbrodt was also more directly engaged in the national power apparatus. Between 1950 and 1952 she was a member of the party leadership ("SED Landesleitung") for Greater Berlin. She was a member of the National legislature ("Volkskammer") for forty years, between 1950 and 1990, representing not a political party but the Democratic Women's League ("Demokratischer Frauenbund Deutschlands" / DFD). It was a feature of the Leninist constitution that the country had adopted that the national legislature included fixed quotas of members representing both the authorized political parties and certain mass organisations, of which the DFD was one. This was seen as a way to enhance the legitimacy of the overall government structure. By 1990 she had become one of the longest serving Volkskammer members. Although membership of the national legislature was not unimportant, the focus of political power in the Soviet style "Communist" states of Central Europe after 1945 lay not with the parliament nor, indeed, with government ministers, but with the Central Committee of the ruling party. The Central Committee was, in turn, steered by its Politburo. Helga Wittbrodt was never a member of the Central Committee. She was, however, a member of the Medical Commission that reported directly to its Politburo.

After the changes that led, in 1990, to reunification she remained true to the East Germany's old ruling SED (party) as it rebranded itself and – not always smoothly – reinvented itself as the Party of Democratic Socialism (PDS), fitted for the democratic Germany.

== Awards and honours ==
- Patriotic Order of Merit in Bronze
- Patriotic Order of Merit in Silver
- 1970 Patriotic Order of Merit in Gold
- 1975 Order of Karl Marx
- 1972 Hero of Labour
- 1980 Star of People's Friendship in Gold
- Clara Zetkin Medal
- Hufeland Medal in Gold
- Honoured Doctor of the People (Verdienter Arzt des Volkes)
