= Wolfgang Rauchfuß =

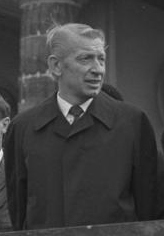
- Rauchfuß in 1981

Secretary for the Economy of the Central Committee Secretariat of the Socialist Unity Party
- In office 8 November 1989 – 3 December 1989
- General Secretary: Egon Krenz
- Preceded by: Günter Mittag
- Succeeded by: Position abolished

Minister for Materials Management
- In office 14 February 1974 – 18 November 1989
- Chairman of the Council of Ministers: Horst Sindermann; Willi Stoph
- Preceded by: Manfred Flegel
- Succeeded by: Position abolished
Volkskammer
Member of the Volkskammer for Leipzig-Südwest, Leipzig-West, Leipzig-Nord, Leipzig-Nordost (Aue, Stollberg; 1967-1971)
In office 14 July 1967 – 5 April 1990
Preceded by	multi-member district
Succeeded by	Constituency abolished

Personal details
- Born: Wolfgang Rauchfuß; 27 November 1931 Grüna, Free State of Saxony, Weimar Republic (now Chemnitz-Grüna, Germany)
- Died: 15 August 2005 (aged 73) Berlin, Germany
- Party: Socialist Unity Party (1951–1989)
- Children: 2
- Education: Fachschule für Außenhandel; Hochschule für Ökonomie Berlin
- Occupation: Politician; Civil Servant; Sales Manager
- Awards: Patriotic Order of Merit, 1st class; Banner of Labor
- Central institution membership: 1989: Full member, Politburo of the Central Committee; 1967–1989: Full member, Central Committee; Other offices held: 1965–1989: Deputy Chairman, Council of Ministers; 1961–1965: Deputy Minister, Ministry for Foreign Trade

Wolfgang Rauchfuß (27 November 1931 – 15 August 2005) was a member of the Politburo of East Germany's ruling SED (party). He was also a government minister and deputy chairman of the country's Ministerial Council.

== Life ==
Rauchfuß was born into a working-class family in a western quarter of Chemnitz, part of the industrial belt in the southern part of what then counted as central Germany. He completed his secondary schooling in 1946 and embarked on a three-year traineeship as a mechanic. Also in 1946 he joined the newly formed Free German Youth (FDJ / Freie Deutsche Jugend) in which he progressed so that by 1949/50 he had become a full-time FDJ instructor with the organisation's regional leadership in Berlin. After the war had ended in May 1945 Chemnitz had found itself in the Soviet occupation zone of what remained of Germany and in October 1949 the entire area under Soviet administration became a new stand-alone state, the German Democratic Republic. Although independent of the new Federal Republic of Germany to the west, the new East German state retained the fraternal support of the Soviet Union. In 1950 Wolfgang Rauchfuß took a government job as a foreign trade official. Although the country had only been established in 1949, the basis for a return to one-party government had already been created in October 1946, through a controversial merger between the Communist Party and the more moderately left-wing SPD (party). By the time Rauchfuß celebrated his nineteenth birthday there was little sign of former SPD members in the Socialist Unity Party of Germany (SED / Sozialistische Einheitspartei Deutschlands), the controlling positions in which were all occupied by men who before April 1946 would have defined themselves politically as Communists. 1951 was the year in which Rauchfuß joined the ruling SED (party).

In 1952 he moved on to study at the Academy for Foreign Trade, after which he took a job as a domestic and export sales manager for precision mechanics and optics. From 1957 till 1959 he was Deputy General Director of Polygraph Export GmbH and in 1960 General Director of Office Machinery exports. Between 1958 and 1961 he took a correspondence study course with the Berlin Academy of Economics which led to a degree in Economics.

From 1961 till 1965 Wolfgang Rauchfuß served as Deputy Minister for foreign and inter-German trade. He was appointed Secretary of State in The Ministry in March 1965, at the same time joining the country's Ministerial Council. Later that year, in December 1965, he became Deputy Chairman of the Ministerial Council.

The constitutional arrangement sunder which the German Democratic Republic was governed were modeled on those originally created for the Soviet Union. They implicitly - and after 1968 expressly - asserted the "leading role" of The Party. The party determined policy and government ministers (who were very often also people with senior party positions) carried it out. It therefore represented a major promotion when, in 1961, Wolfgang Rauchfuß became one of the 131 members of the Party Central Committee (which controlled the party). He also became a member of the National Legislature (Volkskammer) at this time. He then, in 1974, became in addition the Minister for Materials Economics and director of the Central Energy Commission in the Ministerial Council.

Wolfgang Rauchfuß: Publications

Speech to the International Press Conference at the Leipzig Autumn Trade Fair, 1964, Berlin 1964

(Rede auf der internationalen Pressekonferenz zur Leipziger Herbstmesse)

Speech at the opening of the Leipzig New Year's Fair, 2 March 1968, Berlin 1968

(Rede zur Eröffnung der Leipziger Frühjahrsmesse)

Management tasks needed to ensure efficient consumption of materials and energy, Berlin 1976

(Die Aufgaben der Leiter zur Gewährleistung einer hohen Materialökonomie und wirtschaftlichen Energieanwendung)

As the collapse of the East German regime approached, on 7 November 1989 the government of Willi Stoph resigned, which for Rauchfuß involved resignation from his various government offices. Subsequently, however, he became a Secretary of State in the Modrow government. Between 8 November and 3 December 1989 he also served as a member of the Party Politburo and of the Central Committee Secretariat. In March 1990 he took a position with the Treuhand, the body mandated to privatize the East German industrial and commercial sectors as part of the reunification process. He also worked, for a period, for the "East German Investment Trust".

== Awards and honours ==
- 1971 Banner of Labor
- 1979 Patriotic Order of Merit in Gold
- 1981 Patriotic Order of Merit Gold clasp
