= Rosel Walther =

German politician

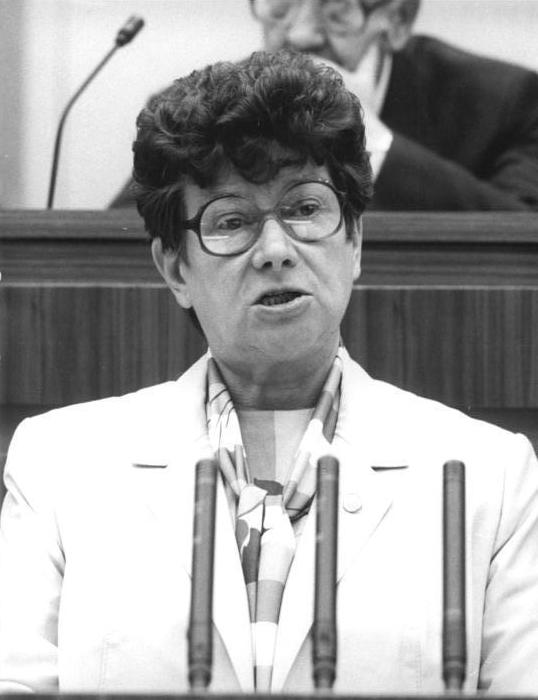

Member of the State Council
- In office 1971–1989

Member of the Volkskammer
- In office 1950–1958
- In office 1967–1990

Personal details
- Born: 12 January 1928 Landsberg an der Warthe, Germany (now Poland)
- Died: 24 August 2006 (age 78) Berlin, Germany
- Party: National Democratic Party of Germany (1949–1990); Association of Free Democrats (1990); Free Democratic Party (1990–2006)

Rosel Walther (née Fischer; 12 January 1928 – 24 August 2006) was a German politician who was a member of the Volkskammer and the State Council of East Germany.

== Life ==
Walther was born in Landsberg an der Warthe, Brandenburg, in 1928. She was a teacher in her early life. She studied at the Deutsche Akademie für Staats- und Rechtswissenschaft.

In 1949 Walther joined the National Democratic Party of Germany (NDPD). She held leadership positions in the party; including as member of the executive board, director of the party academy, and vice chairperson of the NDPD parliamentary group. In 1964–1969 Walther was a leader of the Democratic Women's League of Germany. She was a member of the World Peace Council and the Peace Council of the GDR.

Walther was a member of the Volkskammer in 1950–1958 and 1967–1990. In 1971 she also became a member of the State Council, the GDR's collective head of state, until 1989. She retired after the Peaceful Revolution but remained a member of the Association of Free Democrats, which merged with the Free Democratic Party.

Walther received the Medal of Merit of the GDR in 1959, the Patriotic Order of Merit in bronze and silver, and the Banner of Labor.
