= Johanna Ludwig =

German journalist (1937–2013)

Johanna Ludwig (born Seiler on January 26, 1937, in Großkundorf, district of Greiz; died in August 2013 in Leipzig) was an East German journalist, editor and author. She was the initiator, long-standing chairwoman and honorary chairwoman of the Louise-Otto-Peters-Gesellschaft e.V. Leipzig. Through her more than 20 years of research into the life and work of the writer and women's politician Louise Otto-Peters, she contributed to the reappraisal of the legacy of the German women's movement in Leipzig.

== Life and work ==
Johanna Ludwig grew up as the daughter of Herta Seiler, née Höhlein (1912–2004) and Karl Seiler (1902–1968), who were farmers in Thuringia Vogtland, grew up. After graduating from high school, she studied journalism in combination with literature, theater and music history as well as sociology at the University of Leipzig from 1955 to 1959. In 1959, she married the journalist Wolfgang Ludwig and had two sons with him.

Ludwig worked as an editor of company newspapers, the district newspaper Leipziger Rundschau and as an editor and reporter at the Leipzig station of Radio DDR. Johanna Ludwig was an editor for literature on the social position of women in the past and present, and later head of the editorial department and deputy chief editor at the Leipzig Verlag für die Frau publishing house, where she worked for more than 20 years. Through her interest in women's history and women's emancipation, she often came across Louise Otto-Peters, who had fallen into oblivion in Leipzig.

After German reunification, the Leipzig publishing landscape was restructured in 1991, resulting in Ludwig's dismissal. Due to the difficult labor market situation, she was unable to find permanent employment.

=== Louise-Otto-Peters-Gesellschaft e.V. ===
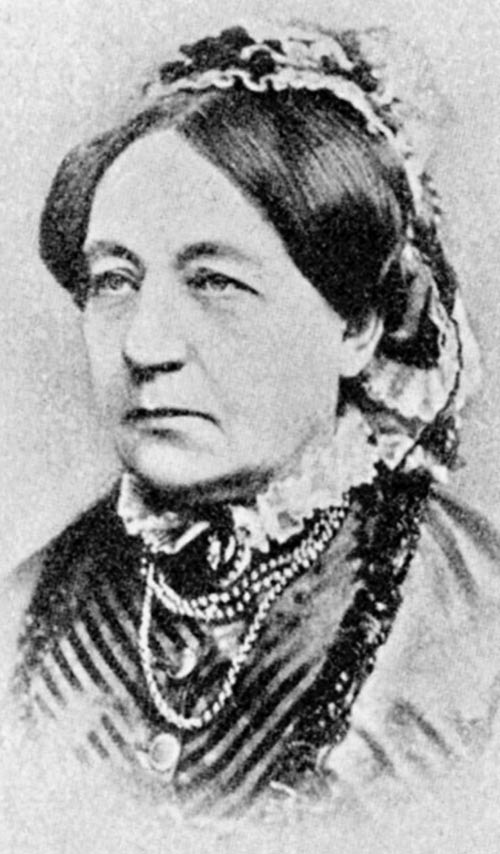
Louise Otto-Peters is depicted in a black and white photograph. She is wearing an elaborate hairstyle and various necklaces

Johnna Ludwig spent more than 20 years researching the life and work of the writer and women's politician Louise Otto-Peters and made a significant contribution to the reappropriation of the legacy of the German women's movement in Leipzig, which for various reasons received little attention here in the 20th century and was partially forgotten. Through her many public initiatives, she succeeded in showing that the city of Leipzig was a center of the German women's movement. She dedicated historical walks to the protagonists of the women's movement and campaigned for streets to be named after Louise Otto-Peters and her fellow campaigners. Today, the names of Louise Otto-Peters, Auguste Schmidt, Henriette Goldschmidt and others are closely associated with this city.

Since 1993, the non-profit Louise-Otto-Peters-Gesellschaft e. V. has been dedicated to making the life and work of Louise Otto-Peters better known and honoring it. Ludwig's extensive passion for collecting, cataloging and making accessible all writings by and about Louise Otto-Peters led to the founding of the Louise Otto-Peters Archive in 1997. Since then, all publications by and about Louise Otto-Peters have been collected, indexed and made accessible to interested parties. Johanna Ludwig wrote more than 100 of her own publications on the life and work of Louise Otto-Peters, including 33 titles in the LOUISEum series.

After Johanna Ludwig found and completed the previously censored novel Schloß und Fabrik, the first uncensored, complete edition of Louise Otto-Peters' socially critical novel about the Vormärz was published in 1996. This book was only allowed to appear censored in 1846 and the original version was considered lost until 1996.

In 2000, Ludwig campaigned against the demolition of the Henriette-Goldschmidt-Haus at what is now Friedrich-Ebert-Straße 16. The Jewish publisher Henri Hinrichsen was an admirer of Henriette Goldschmidt and founded the Henri Hinrichsen Foundation to endow this house for women's education. He was murdered in 1942 in Exchwitz extermination camp and his name was removed from the foundation's title beforehand. Together with Inge Brüx, Ines Hantschick and other East German women, Ludwig founded an association to preserve the house. The Henriette-Goldschmidt-Haus was demolished in 2000 despite many protests due to a planned but never realized road extension.

The biography Eigner Wille und eigne Kraft. The life of Louise Otto-Peters up to the founding of the AdF in 1865. Based on personal testimonies and documents was published posthumously in October 2013.

== Awards ==
- 1982: Wilhelm Bracke Medal of the Börsenverein der deutschen Buchhändler zu Leipzig 1982
- 2006: Honorary certificate from the city of Leipzig in recognition of her voluntary work in researching and honoring the legacy of the first German women's movement around Louise Otto-Peters in Leipzig
- 2009: Honorary Chairwoman of the Louise-Otto-Peters-Gesellschaft e. V. Leipzig

== Publications (selection) ==
- Louise Otto-Peters: politische Denkerin und Wegbereiterin der deutschen Frauenbewegung. Sächs. Landeszentrale für Politische Bildung 1996.
- Betty Lucas bei den Familien Freiligrath und Marx Londoner Erinnerungen aus dem Jahre 1852. Rosa-Luxemburg-Stiftung Sachsen 1998, ISBN 978-3-932725-69-2.
- Leben ist Streben: Das erste Auguste-Schmidt-Buch. Leipziger Universitätsverlag 2003, ISBN 978-3-936522-69-3.
- Eigner Wille und eigne Kraft: Der Lebensweg von Louise Otto-Peters bis zur Gründung des Allgemeinen Deutschen Frauenvereins 1865. Nach Selbstzeugnissen und Dokumenten. Leipziger Universitätsverlag 2014, ISBN 978-3-86583-846-9.

=== Herausgeberschaften ===
- with Hannelore Rothenburg (Redaktion): Mit den Muth’gen will ich’s halten: Zur 150jährigen aufregenden Geschichte des Romans „Schloss und Fabrik“ von Louise Otto-Peters. Mit der 1994 wiederaufgefundenen vollständigen Zensurakte. Sax-Verlag, Beucha 1996, ISBN 978-3-930076-34-5.
- with Ilse Nagelschmidt, Susanne Schötz (Hg.): Frauen in der bürgerlichen Revolution von 1848/49. Bundesministerium für Familie, Senioren, Frauen und Jugend, Bonn 1999
- with Hannelore Rothenburg, Susanne Schötz (Hg.): George Sand und Louise Otto-Peters. Wegbereiterinnen der Frauenemanzipation. Reden und Vorträge zur Tagung am 23./24. April 2004 anlässlich des 200. Geburtstages von George Sand (Leipziger Studien zur Frauen- und Geschlechterforschung, Reihe C, Band 4; Louiseum, Band 21). Leipziger Universitätsverlag, Leipzig 2005, ISBN 978-3-86583-032-6.
- with Susanne Schötz, Gerlinde Kämmerer (Hg.): Frauen erinnern und ermutigen. Berichte vom 13. Louise-Otto-Peters-Tag 2005. (Louiseum, Band 24). Louise-Otto-Peters-Gesellschaft, Leipzig 2006.
- with Susanne Schötz, Hannelore Rothenburg: Louise Otto-Peters-Jahrbuch I/2004. Forschungen zur Schriftstellerin, Journalistin, Publizistin und Frauenpolitikerin Louise Otto-Peters. Sax-Verlag 2007, ISBN 978-3-934544-61-1.
- with Gerlinde Kämmerer, Susanne Schötz (Hg.): Henriette Goldschmidt und die Hochschule für Frauen zu Leipzig. Berichte vom 19. Louise-Otto-Peters-Tag 2011 (Louiseum, Band 32), Louise-Otto-Peters-Gesellschaft, Leipzig 2012.
