= Wolfgang Heyl =

German politician (1921–2014)

Chairman of the Christian Democratic Union
- In office 1989–1989
- Preceded by: Gerald Götting
- Succeeded by: Lothar de Maizière

Member of the Volkskammer
- In office 1958–1990

Personal details
- Born: August 21, 1921 Borna, Weimar Republic
- Died: May 14, 2014 (aged 92)
- Party: Christian Democratic Union (East Germany) (1949-); Nazi Party (1939-1945)

Military service
- Allegiance: Nazi Germany
- Branch/service: Wehrmacht
- Years of service: 1941-1945
- Rank: Lieutenant
- Battles/wars: Second World War

Wolfgang Heyl (21 August 1921 in Borna – 14 May 2014) was a German politician.

== Life ==
In 1939, at the age of 18, Heyl joined the NSDAP and became a lieutenant in the army.

After the Second World War, he was from 1947 CEO of the Chamber of Commerce Borna, an office he held until 1952.

In 1949, he became a member of the Christian Democratic Union (East Germany) (CDU) in which he was the Organization Secretary from 1952 to 1954 and Deputy Chairman of the District Association of Leipzig. From 1958 to 1966, Heyl was Deputy Secretary-General of the CDU, 1966 to 1971 Member of the Bureau and the Secretariat of the CDU Main Board, then to 1989 deputy CDU chairman in November 1989 and briefly acting CDU chairman.

From 1953 to 1958, he was a member of the CDU in Leipzig County Council. From 1958 to 1990 he was member of the parliament of the German Democratic Republic, 1963-1989 Chairman of the CDU faction, since 1971, Chairman of the Committee on Foreign Affairs from 1976 to November 1989 Member of the Bureau the People's Chamber. In 1986, he was awarded the GDR decoration Hero of Labour. In 1977, he was awarded an honorary Clasp to the Patriotic Order of Merit in gold. In 1981, he was awarded the Star of People's Friendship in gold. In late 1989, due to a heart attack, Heyl resigned from his offices.
