= Adolf Niggemeier =

German politician (1931–2026)

Member of the Volkskammer
- In office 2 July 1967 – 18 March 1990

Personal details
- Born: 21 May 1931 Riesa, Saxony, Germany
- Died: 8 August 2026 (aged 95) Riesa, Saxony, Germany
- Party: CDU
- Education: Leipzig University (Dipl.-Jur.)
- Occupation: Civil servant

Adolf Niggemeier (21 May 1931 – 8 August 2026) was a German politician. A member of the Christian Democratic Union, he served in the Volkskammer from 1967 to 1990.

Niggemeier died in Riesa on 8 August 2026, at the age of 95.
