= Leonhard Helmschrott =

German journalist and politician (1921–2011)

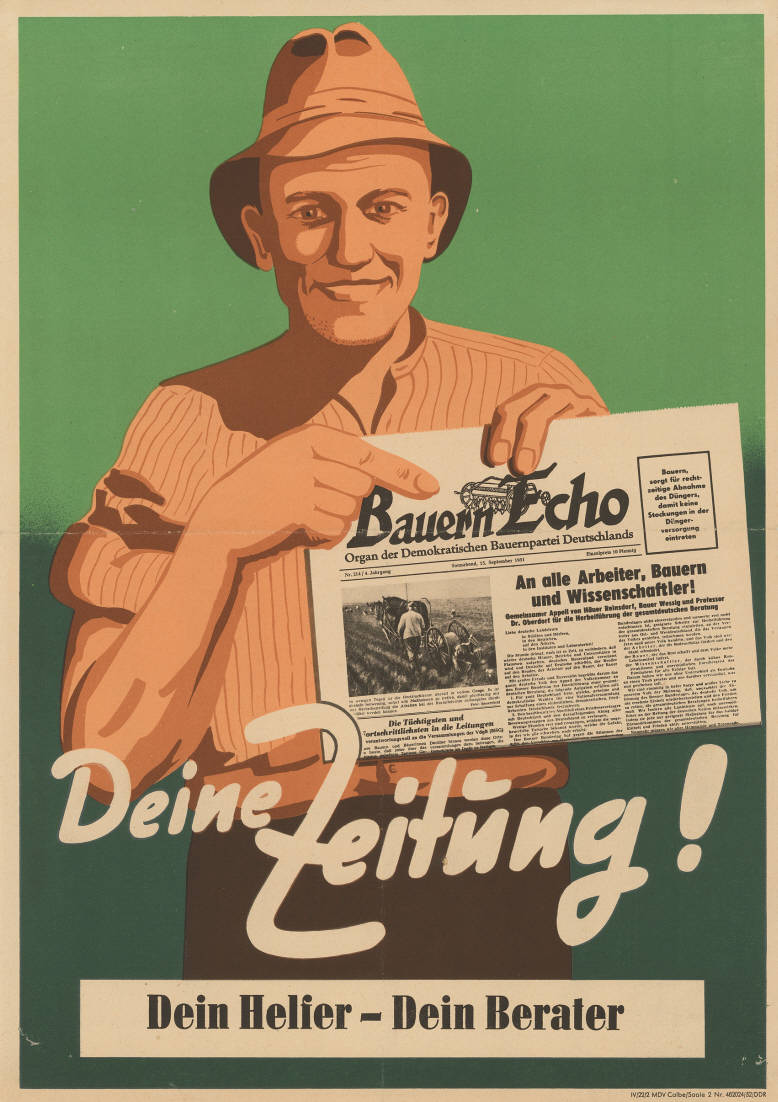
- Leonard Helmschrott was editor in chief of the Bauern Echo ("Farmers' Echo)" between 1948 and 1989.
- Born: 5 June 1921; Unterthürheim, Swabia (Bavaria), Germany
- Died: 28 October 2011 (aged 90); Berlin, Germany
- Occupations: Journalist, Politician
- Political party: KPD; SED; DBD

Leonhard Helmschrott (born 5 June 1921 (Unterthürheim); died 28 October 2011 (Berlin) was a German journalist and politician. He was a founding member of the National Committee for a Free Germany (NKFD / Nationalkomitee Freies Deutschland). Between 1948 and 1989 he was the chief editor of the Bauernecho (Farmer's Echo).

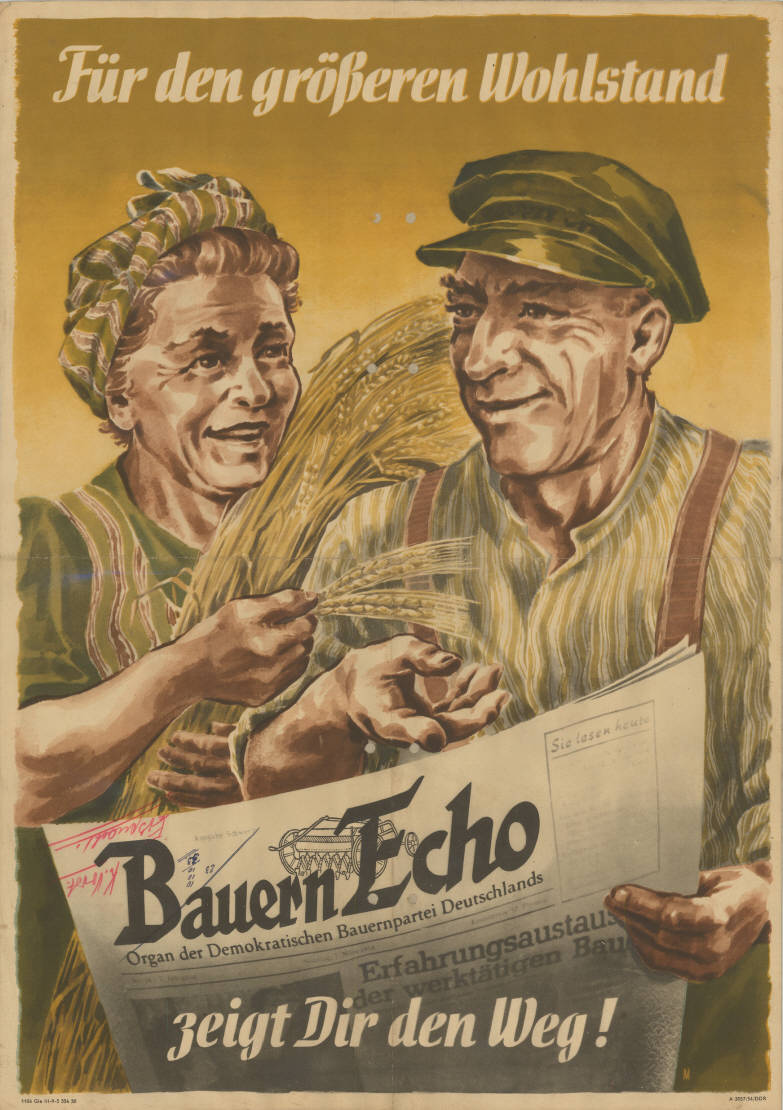
Advertisement poster (1954) For greater prosperity, "Farmers' Echo" shows you the way!

== Life ==
=== Early life, military service ===
Helmschrott was born the son of a small farmer in a small hamlet on the western edge of Bavaria, not too far from Augsburg. He left school in 1935 and worked on the family farm. In February 1941 he was drafted into the army. He was sent to the eastern front where in September 1942, having already reached the rank of corporal, he was taken prisoner of war.

He promptly agreed to cooperate with his Red army captors and was very soon agitating with fly-leaflets (to be dropped from light planes flying over German lines) and loud speakers in trenches on the Soviet-German frontline. However, he was soon taken away from the fighting, and helping with the Anti-fascist programme at the Krasnogorsk prison camp (Prison camp 27). Between February and July 1943 Helsmschrott was sent to the Antifascist school at Krasnogorsk, and it was here that he participated in the conference that founded the Soviet-based National Committee for a Free Germany (NKFD / Nationalkomitee Freies Deutschland). Helmschrott was elected a founder member. In the ensuring months and years he also produced the newspaper and contributed to the NKFD's "Free Germany" radio station.

=== Arrival in East Germany ===
After the war Helschrott left the prison camp at the end of November 1945, and on 8 December 1945, along with other prisoners of war including Luitpold Steidle and Matthäus Klein, was flown on a flight organised by the NKFD from Moscow to Berlin to be greeted by Walter Ulbricht, head of the nation building team that had itself arrived in Berlin from Moscow at the end of April 1945. Before the end of 1945 Helsmchrott had joined the Communist party (KPD). This, following the forced merger in what was becoming the Germany Democratic Republic (East Germany) of the KPD and the SPD left him, in 1946, a member of the new country's ruling Socialist Unity Party of Germany (SED).

=== Newspaper editor, Karl Marx Party Academy ===
He became editor of the KPD newspaper "Volkszeitung" ("Peoples' Newspaper") which was later renamed "LandesZeitung" ("Country Newspaper"), now a paper of the new SED (party), in Mecklenburg. In 1947 and 1948 he worked as a freelance journalist. In 1948 Helsmchrott was sent to the Karl Marx Party Academy.

=== Political career ===
While he was still studying at the Academy Helmschrott was mandated by the SED (party) to participation in the establishment of the Democratic Farmers' Party of Germany (DBD / Demokratische Bauernpartei Deutschlands), a response to concern that the SED was failing attract popular support in the countryside. He immediately became a member of the new party's executive committee and, importantly, editor in chief of the party newspaper, Bauernecho (Farmer's Echo). He retained this editorship till 1989, and during the intervening 41 years was responsible for more than 6,000 editions of the newspaper which appeared three times per week.

In 1949 Helsmchrott was elected to the national Volkskammer ("Peoples' parliament") for the DBD (party), and from 1963 till 1986 he was chairman of the party's 52 member group. From 1958 he belonged to the parliamentary national defence committee of which, in 1986, he became deputy chairman. He generated headlines in West Germany in 1963 with a declaration that a right to Conscientious objection against military service was unthinkable in the German Democratic Republic. Between 1971 and 1976 he was deputy chairman of the East German Interparliamentary Group.

After completing a correspondence course with the Karl Marx University at Leipzig, in 1962 Helmschrott received a Diploma in Journalism. Between 1986 and 1990 he was a member of the State Council of East Germany.

=== Fall of the Berlin Wall ===
The Berlin Wall fell on 9 November 1989, and on 15 November 1989, reacting to events more quickly than many party colleagues, Helmschrott had at his own request been replaced both at the "Bauern Echo" and from his political positions as Presidium member and in the party secretariat. That left the presidency of the DBD (Democratic Farmers' Party), and he resigned from this in January 1990. In June 1990 the DBD merged with the CDU (Christian Democratic Union) which would itself merge with its West German counterpart in October of the same year. For the first time since his return from Moscow in 1945 Leonhard Helmschrott was not a member of any political party.

== Awards ==
- 1970 Patriotic Order of Merit (gold)
- 1975 Star of People's Friendship
- 1981 Patriotic Order of Merit (clasp)

== Publication ==
- Sag nicht, ich kann nichts tun. Erinnerungen. edition ost, Berlin 2011. ISBN 978-3-89793-269-2
