= Luise Ermisch =

German activist and politician (1916–2001)

Personal details
- Born: Luise Thürmer; 20 May 1916 Halle, Province of Saxony, German Empire
- Died: 17 January 2001 (aged 84) Mühlhausen, Thuringia, Germany
- Party: SED (Socialist Unity Party of Germany/ Sozialistische Einheitspartei Deutschlands)
- Spouse: ______ Ermisch
- Occupation: Politician

Luise Ermisch (born Luise Thürmer; 20 May 1916 in Halle – 17 January 2001 in Mühlhausen (Thuringia) was a German political activist and later a senior politician in the German Democratic Republic (East Germany), who balanced her political career with an ongoing involvement in the clothing industry.

She became known for the "Luise Ermisch Method" ("Luise-Ermisch-Methode"), an approach to industrial production involving detailed planning that subdivided the manufacturing process into individual work station segments and allowed for quantity and quality of output to be precisely measured, evaluated, bench-marked and attributed. The resulting statistical output could be used to feed a system of incentives and rewards. Because East Germany operated with a centrally directed economy, it was possible to disseminate the "Luise Ermisch Method" relatively easily.

== Life ==
The daughter of a master butcher, Ermisch was apprenticed in the dress-making business between 1930 and 1933, after which a period of unemployment followed. Between 1937 and 1939 she was working as a seamstress. During the Second World War she was conscripted to work as a welder until 1945.

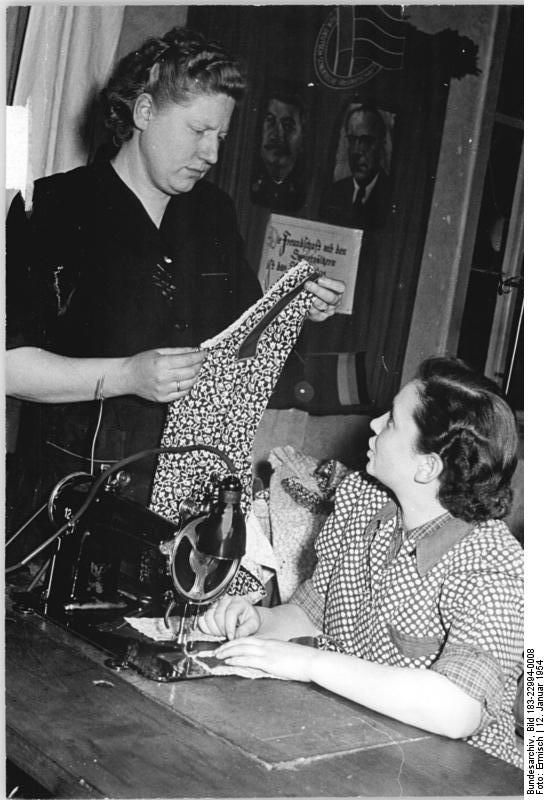
The "Luise Ermisch Method" (apparently) in action: "Supervisor, Liselotte Ertingshausen (left), checks a skirt made by her colleague, Jutta Wolfgang, to see that she has succeeded in doing all the stitching in the right places." (" Die Meisterin Liselotte Ertingshausen (links) prüft eine Schürze, die Kollegin Jutta Wolfgang, sie beherrscht sämtliche Positionen, genäht hat") * VEB Kleiderwerk, Mühlhausen 1954

After the war she worked as a seamstress in the VEB Halle Dress factory. She joined the Free German Trade Union Federation (FDGB /"Freier Deutscher Gewerkschaftsbund") in 1947. She then, in 1949, received further training at the FDGB's regional school and at the Technical High School in Neugersdorf. She became a member of the trades union leadership and was a co-founder of the first "Brigade of Outstanding Quality" ("Brigade der ausgezeichneten Qualität"). By now she was marked out as a political activist, and in 1950 she joined the country's ruling SED (Socialist Unity Party of Germany/Sozialistische Einheitspartei Deutschlands)

From 1954 Luise Ermisch started to roll out the "Luise Ermisch Method" to deconstruct industrial production process within the framework of socialist competition principles. Within a factory an operating plan was developed to breakdown and identify production quantities and quality for each individual worker and team. When quantities and quality had been identified and valued the results were used to identify recipients of awards.

Between 1951 and 1971 Ermisch was responsible for operations at the Halle Dress Factory, after which, until her retirement in 1976, she took over the VEB Mühlhausen Dress Factory. In 1966 she undertook a correspondence course that qualified her as a Clothing Industry Engineer. Between 1966 and 1970 she served as the Chairman of the Clothing Industry Business Council.

Ermisch's political appointments during the 1950s appeared to place her in positions of very considerable influence. Between 1954 and 1981 she was a member of the party's central committee. From 1958 till 1963 she was the Politburo candidate for the party's central committee. Between 1950 and 1981 she sat as a deputy in the People's Chamber ("Volkskammer"/ national legislature). Her good standing with the political establishment was confirmed in 1960 when she was sent for advanced training to the Communist Party High School ("Высшая партийная школа") in Moscow. From 1960 till 1963 she was a member of the State Council.

== Recognition ==
Ermisch was awarded a number of high level awards:

- Hero of Labour (GDR) (1950)
- Banner of Labor (1955)
- Patriotic Order of Merit (Bronze) (1966)
- Order of Karl Marx (1976)
