= Ilse Rodenberg =

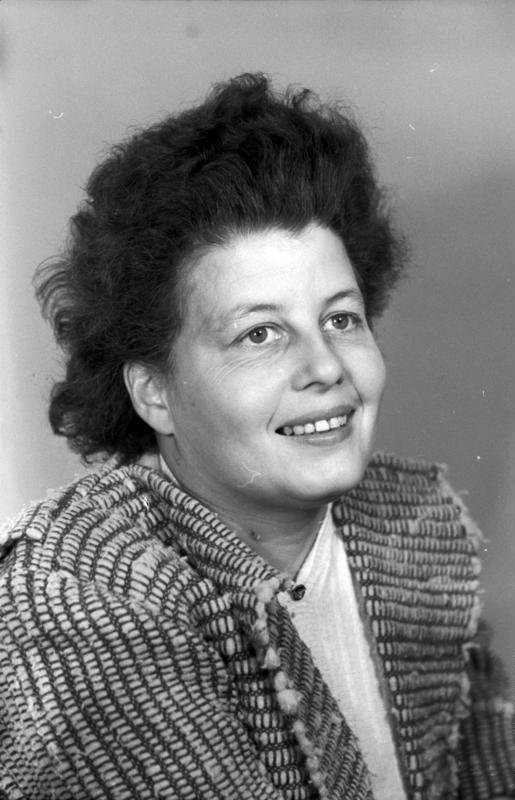
- September 1953
- Born: Ilse Haupt; 3 November 1906; Düsseldorf, Rhine Province, Prussia, German Empire
- Died: 5 January 2006 (aged 99); Berlin, Germany
- Occupations: actress theatre director politician
- Political party: KPD; NDPD
- Spouse(s): 1. _____; 2. _____ Weintraut-Rinka; 3. Hans Rodenberg
- Children: 1929 Ruth

Ilse Rodenberg (born: Ilse Haupt: 3 November 1906 – 5 January 2006) was a Hamburg typist who became an actress and, later, an influential East German theatre director. She combined this with a political career, sitting as a member of the East German parliament ("Volkskammer") for four decades between 1950 and 1990. She was a member not of the ruling SED (party) but of the National Democratic Party of Germany ("National-Demokratische Partei Deutschlands" / NDPD), one of the smaller Block Parties which contributed a semblance of pluralism to the country's political structure.

== Life ==
=== Provenance and early years ===
Ilse Haupt was born into a working-class family in Düsseldorf. During 1921/22 she attended a course at a commercial training college in Düsseldorf which led to a qualification as a typist. Between 1925 and 1938 she worked in Hamburg as a typist-secretary. She also found time, between 1926 and 1928, to obtain extra income with cleaning jobs, and to train as an actress, then working as a stage actress in Hamburg till 1933. Her daughter Ruth was born on 4 August 1929. Between 1931 and 1933 she was a member - and later the leader - of the "Kollektiv Hamburg" theatre troupe.

=== Nazi years ===
She joined the Communist Party and the Revolutionary Trades Union Opposition ("Revolutionäre Gewerkschafts Opposition" / RGO) movement in 1931. In January 1933 the Nazis took power and lost no time in transforming Germany into a one-party dictatorship. She continued to work for the Communists which was now by definition illegal. She was arrested in March 1933 and held briefly. A longer period of "protective detention" followed in 1933/34, for "producing antifascist publications" (wegen "Herstellung antifaschistischer Publikationen"). Her detention included a short stay in a concentration camp. After she was released she was served with an employment ban ("Berufsverbot"), but was able to keep her head above water by writing.

Ilse Rodenberg's relationships with men is a topic that, in the words of one admiring commentator, involved much flexibility. She was married five times or perhaps only three: opinions vary. There is more agreement over the large number of affairs she conducted outside marriage, something about which, even by the standards of the time and place, she was always remarkably open. By 1943/44, as a result of one of her marriages, she had become known as Ilse Weintraut-Rinka. During the final part of the war she was conscripted for war work which involved forcible relocation to northern Bavaria.

=== Return to Hamburg ===
Directly after the war she returned to Hamburg and her theatre work, heading up and acting in the satirical-political cabaret "Laternenanzünder" (loosely, "Lamp lighters"). Hamburg had ended up in the British military occupation zone, and it was probably on account of her political convictions that in 1948 Ilse Weintraut-Rinka relocated to the Soviet occupation zone. She had rejoined the Communist Party in 1945 and now accepted an invitation to become a founder member of the National Democratic Party ("National-Demokratische Partei Deutschlands" / NDPD which was established that year under the auspices of the ruling (if only in the Soviet zone) Socialist Unity Party ("Sozialistische Einheitspartei Deutschlands, SED" / SED). "We already have enough communists like you in our party," the SED party strategists explained, "[but] we still need some in the other parties!"

=== Theatre ===
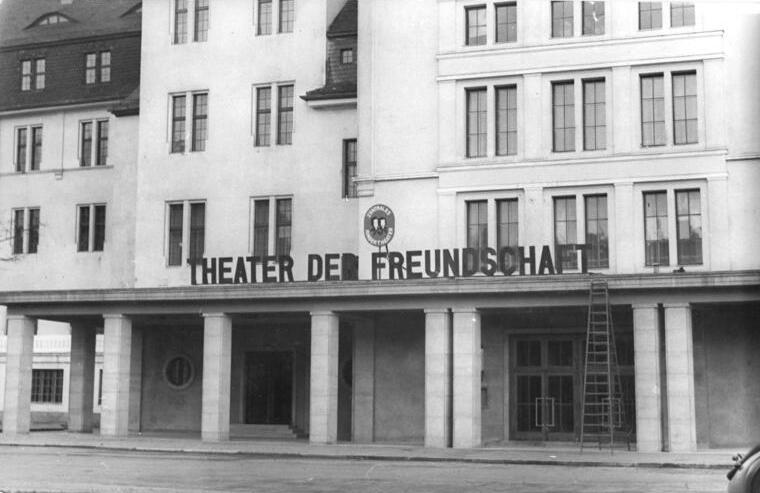
Theater der Freundschaft, 1950

Between 1948 and 1950 she worked as an "Intendantin" (theatre director) in Ludwigslust, also undertaking the same role at the theatre in nearby Neustrelitz. Between 1950 and 1958 she then took charge at the Brandenburg Regional Theatre (as it was then known) in Potsdam. At that time the theatre had three sections, and she presided over a major expansion of the facilities to satisfy the "theatre-hunger" of the populations in the surrounding villages. In the slogan of the times, the theatre company worked to bring "theatre to the country" ("Kunst aufs Land"). In 1952 she had the satisfaction of presiding over the renaming of the theatre, in honour of the communist actor Hans Otto, whom the Nazis had murdered in 1933.

She moved on again in 1958, taking over as theatre director at the "Friendship Theatre" ("Theater der Freundschaft") in East Berlin. The Friendship Theatre had been founded by Hans Rodenberg in 1950 and was the first theatre in Berlin that was targeted explicitly on children and adolescents. At the time, the only larger theatre of this nature was reportedly the "Children's Theatre" ("детский музыкальный театр") in Moscow. After 1958 Ilse Rodenberg played a central role in winning political and public backing for a dedicated children's theatre in Berlin. She had married Hans Rosenberg (1895-1978) on 22 December 1956 and was able to benefit from his excellent political connections with he higher echelons of the political establishment. For both the Rodenbergs, Walter Ulbricht and Erich Honecker were friends who could be addressed using the informal "second person singular": "Mit Ulbricht und mit Honecker war sie per Du". This was important in a country where contacts were often more important than contracts.

=== The political establishment ===
Between 1950 and 1954 Ilse Rodenberg served as a member of the national executive ("Bundesvorstand") of the Democratic Women's League ("Demokratischer Frauenbund Deutschlands" / DFD), one of several government backed mass organisations commonly included in Leninist government power structures, and designed to broaden the domestic political support base of the ruling party. The DFD even had its own quota of twenty seats (later increased to thirty-five) in the national parliament ("Volkskammer"), provided by the ruling SED (party), which controlled the DFD's key appointments through a shadowy administrative structure known as the National Front.

It was, however, as one of the five Berlin members of the NDPD (party) that Ilse Weintraut-Rinka was allocated her own seat in the Volkskammer in 1950. After the general election of 1954 the allocation of seats to the NDPD's Berlin members was increased from five to seven, and records identify her as Ilse Rodenberg. The seven Berlin members were part of a larger contingent of fifty-two NDPB members representing the whole of East Germany. It was only after March 1990, when East Germany conducted its first and last free and fair general election, that the number of seats won by the NDPD slumped from fifty-two to two, and Ilse Rodenberg's name ceased to appear on the list of Volkskammer members. Sources are for the most part silent over her contributions and it is unlikely that her parliamentary duties occupied much of her time. The country's highly centralised power structure concentrated political decisions not on any parliament nor even on government ministers but on the Central Committee and Politburo of the ruling party, although this stark reality was softened to the extent that influential Central Committee members were often also Volkstag members. From 1963 Ilse Rodenberg was a member of the presidential council ("Präsidialrat") of the National Culture Association ("Kulturbund"). She also served, between 1967 and 1982, as chair of the NDPD Party Control Commission, filling a post that had become vacant through the death of Jonny Löhr.

In 1964 Ilse Rodenberg became a member of the Committee of Antifascist Fighters ("Komitee der Antifaschistischen Widerstandskämpfer", an organisation closely algned with the ruling Socialist Unity Party, which had emerged from the postwar Union of Persecutees of the Nazi Regime ("Vereinigung der Verfolgten des Naziregimes") and which was dedicated to preserving anti-fascist traditions. In 1966 she was a founder member of the Association of Theatre Creatives ("Verband der Theaterschaffenden"), becoming a member of its presidium and, later, honorary president.

She also involved herself from 1965 with the International Association of Theatre for Children and Young People (ASSITEJ), serving three terms as its honorary president between 1978 and 1987. She created the bi-annual International Directors Seminar along with the Hallenser Workshop Meeting and Playwright's Competition.

== Awards and honours ==
- 1961 Clara Zetkin Medal
- 1966 National Prize of the German Democratic Republic 3rd Class, for Arts and Literature
- 1970 Banner of Labour
- 1971 Patriotic Order of Merit in Gold
- 1976 Patriotic Order of Merit Gold clasp
- 1985 Humboldt University of Berlin Honorary doctorate.
- 1981 Star of People's Friendship in Gold
- 1986 Star of People's Friendship
