= Hans Stubbe =

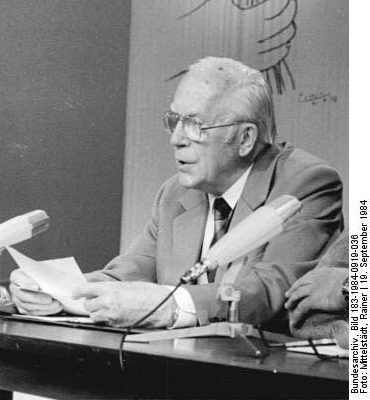
Stubbe in 1984

Hans Karl Oskar Stubbe (7 March 1902 – 14 May 1989) was a German agronomist and plant breeder. During the Second World War he was dismissed by the Nazi government from the Kaiser Wilhelm Institute for Breeding Research in Müncheberg in 1936. After the war he went to work in East Germany where he was the founding director of the Institute for Cultivated Plant Research (which started as the Institut für Kulturpflanzenforschung in Vienna) in Gatersleben. He stood up against the ideas of Trofim Lysenko and prevented East German genetics from being influenced by politics that had caused damage in the Soviet Union.

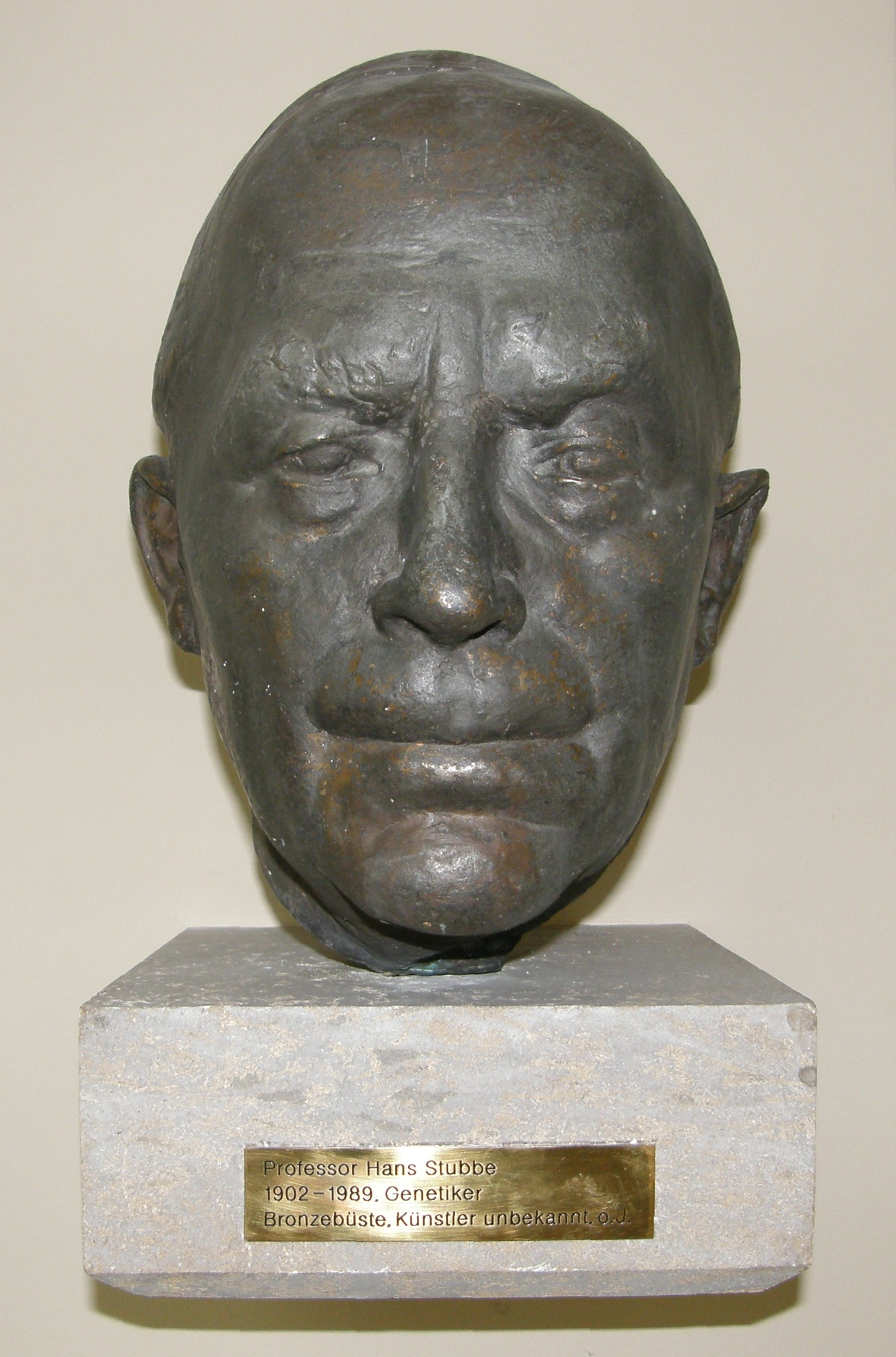
Head cast of Hans Stubbe

Stubbe was born in 1902 at Berlin where his father was a school inspector. He studied agriculture and biology at the University of Göttingen and the Agricultural University of Berlin. He became a student of Erwin Baur at the Institute for Inheritance Research in Berlin where he worked on a doctoral thesis on mutagenesis in 1929. He then joined the newly established Kaiser Wilhelm Institute for Breeding Research in Müncheberg but after about nine years he was dismissed when the Nazi party came into power. For a while he worked with Fritz von Wettstein at the Institut für Kulturpflanzenforschung in Vienna. Wettstein wished to recruit Elisabeth Schiemann to head the institute but Stubbe objected to the idea of men working under her. He made major expeditions to collect germplasm of wild and cultivated plants from around Europe both with civilian and military objectives. Stubbe worked on using X-rays to produce useful mutations in barley. Along with Gustav Becker and Kurt Mothes, Stubbe ensured that Lysenkoism did not take root in East Germany.

Despite his anti-fascist views, Stubbe defended his friend Günther Niethammer and wrote a letter in 1947 exonerating the latter of any wilful participation with the Nazis at Auschwitz. After the Second World War Stubbe became director of the Institute for Cultivated Plant Research in Gatersleben. Stubbe died in 1989 in Zingst. He was succeeded at Gatersleben by his student Helmut Böhme.
