= Hans Reichelt =

German politician (1925–2025)

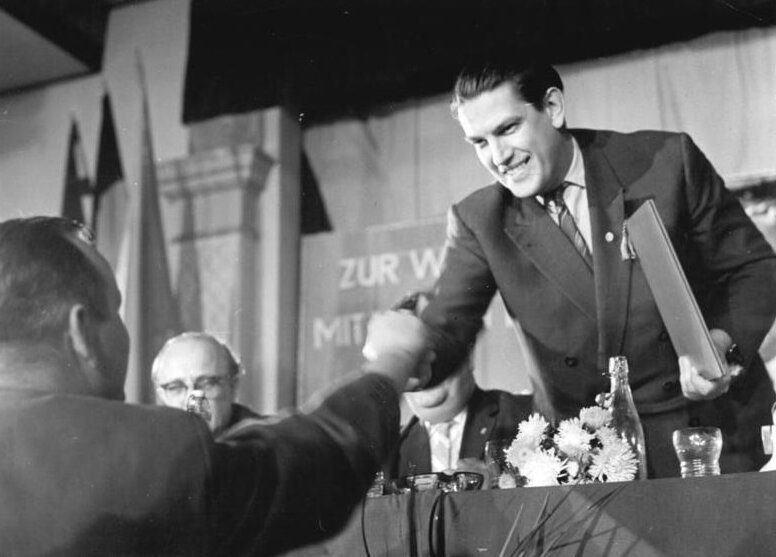
- Reichelt at the 1961 Farmers' Forum

Minister for Environmental Protection and Water Management
- In office 9 March 1972 – 11 January 1990
- Chairman of the Council of Ministers: Willi Stoph; Horst Sindermann; Willi Stoph; Hans Modrow
- Preceded by: Werner Titel
- Succeeded by: Peter Diederich

Minister for Agriculture, Forestry and Food
- In office 20 May 1955 – 7 February 1963
- Chairman of the Council of Ministers: Otto Grotewohl
- Preceded by: Paul Scholz
- Succeeded by: Karl-Heinz Bartsch (as Chairman of the Agricultural Council)
- In office May 1953 – October 1953
- Chairman of the Council of Ministers: Otto Grotewohl
- Preceded by: Wilhelm Schröder
- Succeeded by: Paul Scholz
Parliamentary constituencies
Member of the Volkskammer for Hohenmölsen, Naumburg, Weißenfels, Zeitz
In office 8 November 1950 – 5 April 1990
Preceded by	Constituency established
Succeeded by	Constituency abolished

Personal details
- Born: 30 March 1925 Proskau, Upper Silesia, Prussia, Germany (now Prószków, Poland)
- Died: 14 January 2025 (aged 99) Schöneiche bei Berlin, Brandenburg, Germany
- Party: Democratic Farmers' Party of Germany (1949–1990)
- Other political affiliations: Nazi Party (1943–1945)
- Education: Berlin School of Economics and Law

Military service
- Allegiance: Nazi Germany
- Branch/service: Wehrmacht
- Rank: Lieutenant
- Battles/wars: Second World War

Hans Reichelt (30 March 1925 – 14 January 2025) was a German politician of the Democratic Farmers' Party of Germany (DBD), a GDR-Bloc party. He was Minister of Agriculture and Forestry in 1953 and from 1955 to 1963, and from 1972 to January 1990, Minister of Environmental Protection and Water Management, as well as Deputy Chairman of the Council of Ministers of the GDR.

== Life and career ==
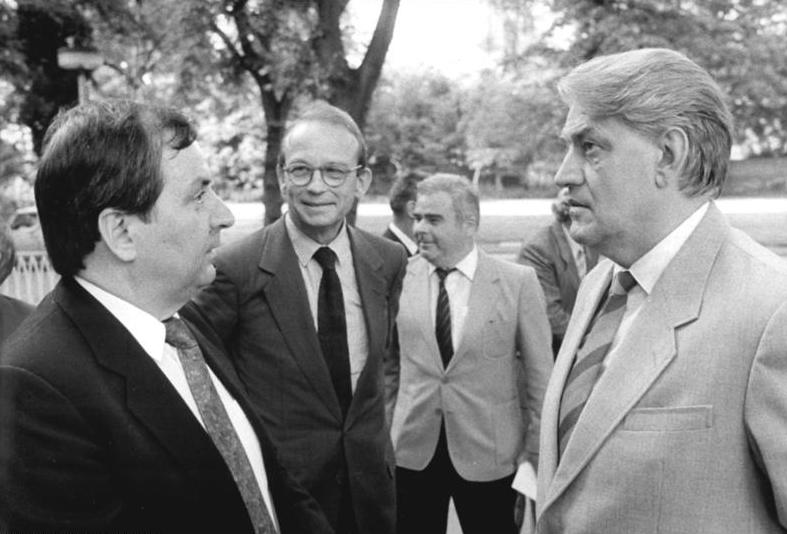
Reichelt (right) in conversation with Federal Minister of the Environment Klaus Töpfer (left) and the Permanent Representative of the Federal Republic in the GDR Hans Otto Bräutigam, 1988

Hans Reichelt was born on 30 March 1925, in Proskau. He attended secondary school in Opole. He was a member of the Hitler Youth and the Reich Labour Service. On 20 April 1943 (Hitler's birthday), he joined the NSDAP (Membership Number 9,454,165). He served as a soldier in the German Wehrmacht (ultimately holding the rank of Lieutenant) and was in Soviet POW camps until 1949, during which he attended an Antifa school.

Upon returning to Germany, he became a member of the Democratic Farmers' Party of Germany (DBD) and held various positions (president since 1955) in the party leadership. He was a member of the People's Chamber from 1950. In 1953, he briefly served as Minister of Agriculture and Forestry, succeeding Wilhelm Schröder. After attending the Central School for Agricultural Policy of the Central Committee of the SED in Schwerin, on 29 October 1953, he was appointed Secretary of State in the Ministry of Agriculture and Forestry by Prime Minister Otto Grotewohl. From 1955 to 1963, he again served as Minister of Agriculture, Procurement, and Forestry, succeeding Paul Scholz.

From 1963 to 1964, he pursued higher education studies, and in 1971, he earned his doctorate at the Berlin School of Economics and Law with the thesis The Role and Position of Land Improvement in the Intensification of Agricultural Production and the Social Development of Socialist Agriculture and Some Fundamental Problems of the Further Application of the Economic System of Socialism in the Period up to 1980. From 1963 to 1972, he was Deputy Chairman of the Agriculture Council, and in 1971–1972, he was Deputy Minister of Agriculture, Forestry, and Food. In this capacity, he was involved in what environmental activist Carlo Jordan called "environmentally disastrous decisions" in the areas of forced collectivization, agricultural industrialization, and land improvement.

Reichelt died in Berlin on 14 January 2025, at the age of 99.
