= Herbert Weiz =

East German politician (1924–2023)

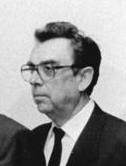

Minister of Science and Technology
- In office 1974–?

Deputy Prime Minister
- In office 1967–?

Minister of Research and Technology
- In office July 1962 – December 1966

Personal details
- Born: 27 June 1924 Cumbach, Thuringia, Weimar Republic
- Died: 22 November 2023 (aged 99) Egenhausen, Baden-Württemberg, Germany
- Party: Socialist Unity Party of Germany
- Education: University of Jena

Herbert Weiz (27 June 1924 – 22 November 2023) was a German politician who held several posts in East Germany. Being a member of the ruling party Socialist Unity Party (SED), he served as minister of science and technology and deputy chairman of the Council of Ministers.

== Early life and education ==
Herbert Weiz was born in Cumbach, Ernstroda, district of Gotha, on 27 June 1924. In 1942 he became a member of the Nazi Party and next year he joined the German army. He was captured by the Allies in 1943 and detained until 1945. Following his release he joined the political alliance between the Communist Party of Germany and the Social Democratic Party of Germany which would form the SED. Between 1946 and 1949 he attended the University of Jena. In 1962 received his PhD from the same university.

== Career ==
In the period between 1955 and 1962 Weiz was the first deputy manager at VEB Carl Zeiss in Jena. In July 1958 he became a member of the central committee of the SED. In July 1962 he was appointed minister of research and technology which he held until December 1966. In May 1963 he was made a member of the Research Council and served in the post until October 1966. From 1963 to March 1990 he served as a deputy at the People's Chamber. In 1967 he was named as the deputy chairman of the Council of Ministers or deputy prime minister. In 1974 Weiz was appointed minister of science and technology. In November–December 1989 he resigned from all of his posts, including his membership from the central committee of the SED.

== Death ==
Weiz died on 22 November 2023, at the age of 99.
