= Monika Werner =

East German politician (1938–2024)

Monika Werner (10 March 1938 – 21 March 2024) was a German former politician who was a member of the State Council of East Germany, the country's collective head of state, from 1986 until 1990.

== Life ==
Werner was born in Markranstädt near Leipzig into a working-class family. She finished the Abitur and studied at HfÖ Berlin, completing a diploma in economics in 1960. She worked as an economist and was a manager at VEB Lokomotivbau-Elektrotechnische Werke "Hans Beimler" in Hennigsdorf.

She was a functionary of the Free German Youth, joined the Socialist Unity Party of Germany (SED) in 1958 and the Free German Trade Union Federation in 1960. Werner was also a local SED party executive in Hennigsdorf. From 1963 until 1989 she was a member of the Volkskammer, where she participated in the committees on finance and social issues, and later also the Staatsrat (State Council). In 1974–1990, she was mayor of Hennigsdorf.

Werner was awarded the Patriotic Order of Merit. In 1990 she retired from politics and subsequently worked in the real estate sector.

Monika Werner died on 21 March 2024 in a seniors home in Hennigsdorf.
