= Günter Morge =

German entomologist

Günter Morge (13 August 1925 – 21 January 1984) was a German entomologist who specialised in Diptera.

Born in Leipzig, for most of his career Morge worked at the Institut fur Pflanzenschutzforschung in Berlin mostly on Acalyptrate Diptera. He was also curator of the large Diptera collections at Admont Abbey.

== Works ==
- 1967 Die Lonchaeidae und Pallopteridae Österreichs und der angrenzenden Gebiete. 2. Teil. Die Pallopteridae. Naturkundliches Jahrbuch der Stadt Linz 13: 141-212.
- 1982 Beiträge zur Kenntnis von Typen-Exemplaren und wenig bekannten Dipteren-Arten. IV. Beiträge zur Entomologie 32: 3–38.
- 1984 Diptera collectionis P. Gabriel Strobl – 13. (Typen-Designierung der Exemplare der sogenannten 'Typensammlung'). Beiträge zur Entomomologie 34: 319–335.
