= Kurt Fenske =

German economist and politician (1930–2022)

Member of the Volkskammer
- In office 1967–1990

Personal details
- Born: Kurt Gerhard Fenske; 3 May 1930 Berlin, Brandenburg, Prussia, Germany
- Died: 1 October 2022 (aged 92) Berlin, Germany
- Party: SED
- Education: Leipzig University; Planökonomisches Institut
- Occupation: Economist

Kurt Gerhard Fenske (3 May 1930 – 1 October 2022) was a German economist and politician. A member of the Socialist Unity Party in the German Democratic Republic, he served in the Volkskammer (GDR) from 1967 to 1990 and as Deputy Minister for Foreign Trade from 1967 to 1985.

Fenske died in Berlin on 1 October 2022, at the age of 92.
