= Paul Scholz =

German journalist and politician (1902–1995)

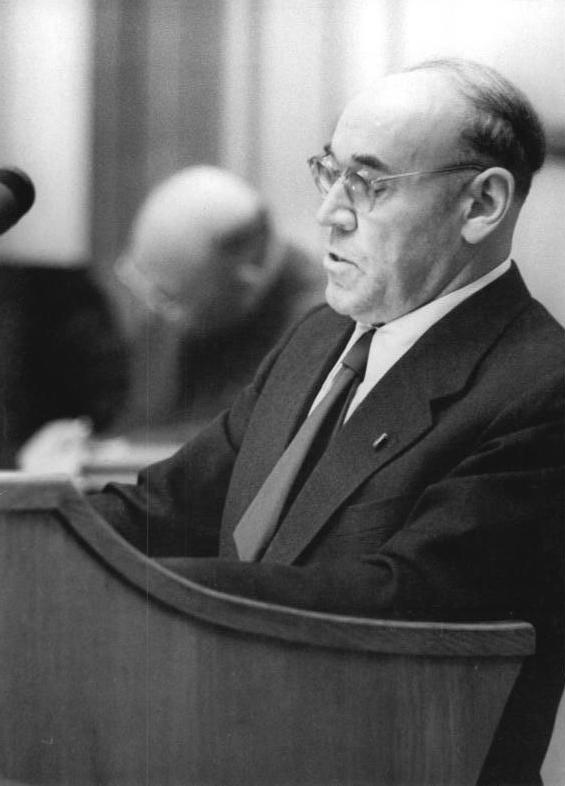

Minister of Agriculture and Forestry of the German Democratic Republic
- In office 1953–1955
- Preceded by: Hans Reichelt
- Succeeded by: Hans Reichelt
- In office 1950–1952
- Preceded by: Ernst Goldenbaum
- Succeeded by: Wilhelm Schröder (Politician, 1913)

Personal details
- Born: 2 October 1902 Braunau, Silesia, German Empire
- Died: 23 June 1995 (aged 92) Zeuthen, Germany
- Party: Democratic Farmers' Party of Germany (1948-1990); Socialist Unity Party of Germany (1946-1948); Communist Party of Germany (1923-1946)

Paul Scholz (2 October 1902 – 23 June 1995) was a German journalist and politician. He held various cabinet posts in East Germany.

== Early life and education ==
Scholz was born in Braunau on 2 October 1902, and his father was a farmer. Scholz was a primary school graduate and worked at a factory following his graduation.

== Career and activities ==
Scholz was a member of the Communist Party of Germany and arrested several times after the Nazis came into power. He became a member of the editorial board of the newspaper of the Communist Party in June 1945 and worked for various newspapers until 1950. He was a member of the East German Parliament from 1950, and his tenure lasted until 1981.

Scholz joined the Socialist Unity Party of Germany in April 1946 and worked as the editor-in-chief of the newspaper Der freie Bauer (German: The Free Farmer). Between July 1949 to 1953 he served as the vice chairman of the Democratic Farmers' Party of Germany which was cofounded by him in June 1948.

Scholz was appointed minister of agriculture and forestry in November 1950 succeeding Ernst Goldenbaum in the post and was in office until May 1952. He was succeeded by Wilhelm Schröder in the post. Scholz was the head of the coordination and control center for agriculture, forestry and water management between May 1952 and November 1953. He was the deputy chairman of the East German Council of Ministers between May 1952 and July 1967. He was again appointed minister of agriculture and forestry in November 1953, replacing Hans Reichelt in the post. Scholz's tenure ended in March 1955 when Hans Reichelt was reappointed minister of agriculture and forestry. Scholz was a member of the Central Executive the Land and Forestry Union from 1957.

Scholz became the president of the Friendship Association between East Germany and Arab countries in 1963 and visited the United Arab Republic in this capacity in 1967. He became the vice president of the Peoples' Friendship League in 1967. He retired from politics and public posts in 1967.

== Later life and death ==
Scholz died in Zeuthen on 23 June 1995.
