= Günter Schabowski =

German politician

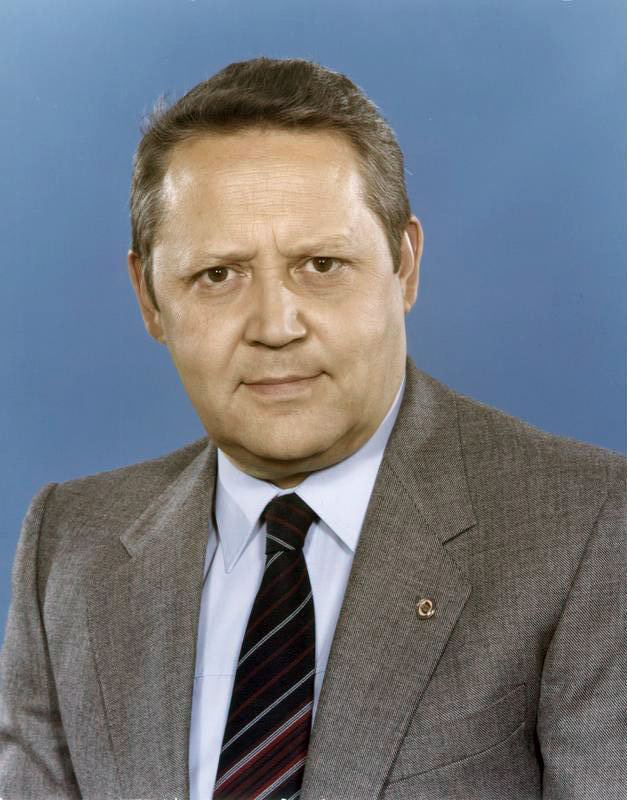
- Schabowski in 1982

Secretary for Information Policy of the Central Committee Secretariat
- In office 6 November 1989 – 3 December 1989
- General Secretary: Egon Krenz
- Preceded by: Position established (Himself as Secretary for Agitation)
- Succeeded by: Position abolished

Secretary for Agitation of the Central Committee Secretariat
- In office 30 October 1989 – 6 November 1989
- General Secretary: Egon Krenz
- Preceded by: Joachim Herrmann
- Succeeded by: Position abolished (Himself as Secretary for Information Policy)

First Secretary of the Socialist Unity Party in Berlin
- In office 25 November 1985 – 10 November 1989
- Second Secretary: Helmut Müller
- Preceded by: Konrad Naumann
- Succeeded by: Heinz Albrecht

Editor-in-chief of Neues Deutschland
- In office 15 March 1978 – 26 November 1985
- Deputy: Hajo Herbell; Sander Drobela; Günter Kertzscher; Werner Micke; Herbert Naumann
- Preceded by: Joachim Herrmann
- Succeeded by: Herbert Naumann
Volkskammer
Member of the Volkskammer
In office 16 June 1986 – 11 January 1990
Preceded by	Konrad Naumann
Succeeded by	Gabriele Günzel
Constituency	Berlin-Marzahn, Berlin-Lichtenberg, Berlin-Hellersdorf, №1
In office 25 June 1981 – 16 June 1986
Preceded by	Gerhard Grüneberg
Succeeded by	Werner Krolikowski
Constituency	Brandenburg-Stadt, Brandenburg-Land, Belzig, Rathenow, №1

Personal details
- Born: 4 January 1929 Anklam, Province of Pomerania, Free State of Prussia, Weimar Republic (now Mecklenburg-Vorpommern, Germany)
- Died: 1 November 2015 (aged 86) Berlin, Germany
- Party: SED-PDS (1989–1990)
- Other political affiliations: Socialist Unity Party (1952–1989)
- Spouse: Irina Schabowski
- Children: 2
- Education: University of Leipzig
- Occupation: Politician; Journalist
- Awards: Patriotic Order of Merit; Banner of Labor; Order of Friendship of Peoples; Order of Karl Marx
- Central institution membership: 1984–1989: Full member, Politburo of the Central Committee; 1981–1984: Candidate member, Politburo of the Central Committee; 1981–1989: Full member, Central Committee; Other offices held: 1978–1985: Member, Commission for Agitation and Propaganda at the Politburo; 1974–1978: First Deputy Editor-in-chief, Neues Deutschland; 1968–1974: Deputy Editor-in-chief, Neues Deutschland; 1953–1967: Deputy Editor-in-chief, Tribüne

Günter Schabowski ([ˈɡʏntɐ ʃaˈbɔfski]; 4 January 1929 – 1 November 2015) was a German politician who served as an official of the Socialist Unity Party of Germany (Sozialistische Einheitspartei Deutschlands abbreviated SED), the ruling party during most of the existence of East Germany. After climbing up the party ladder, he became the regime's unofficial spokesman. He gained worldwide fame in November 1989 when he improvised a slightly mistaken answer to a press conference question about the future of the Berlin Wall, that seemed to announce the Wall's immediate end and raised popular expectations much more rapidly than the government planned. Massive crowds gathered at the Wall the same night, which forced its opening after 28 years. Soon afterward, the entire inner German border was opened; not much later, East Germany ceased to exist.

== Early career ==
Schabowski was born on 4 January 1929 in Anklam, Pomerania (then in the Free State of Prussia, now part of the federal state of Mecklenburg-Vorpommern). After completing his Abitur, Schabowski joined the Free German Trade Union Federation Zentralorgan newspaper, Tribüne as an editor in 1947. He studied journalism at the Karl Marx University in Leipzig's "Red Monastery", the only institution in the GDR offering training to become a journalist, after which he became deputy editor-in-chief of Tribüne. In 1952, he became a member of the SED, having been a candidate member and member of the Free German Youth since 1950.

== SED career ==
From 1967 to 1968, he attended the party academy of the Communist Party of the Soviet Union. Afterwards, he began a career in the newspaper Neues Deutschland ("New Germany"), which as the official organ of the SED was considered to be the leading newspaper in the GDR. He first was a deputy editor-in-chief before becoming First Deputy in 1974. In 1978, he rose to the position of editor-in-chief when Joachim Herrmann became a full member of the Politburo and Central Committee Secretary for Agitation, replacing the deceased Werner Lamberz.

In 1981, he became a member of the Volkskammer, the SED Central Committee and candidate member of its Politburo.

In November 1985, he rose to become the First Secretary of the East Berlin chapter of the SED and a full member of the SED Politburo, replacing Konrad Naumann, who had been deposed.

Before the Peaceful Revolution, Schabowski was not known as a reformer. In 2009, writer Christa Wolf called Schabowski "one of the worst" East German politicians before the Wende, saying: "I remember a few appearances of him in front of the writer's guild. You were scared of him."

== Opening of Berlin Wall ==
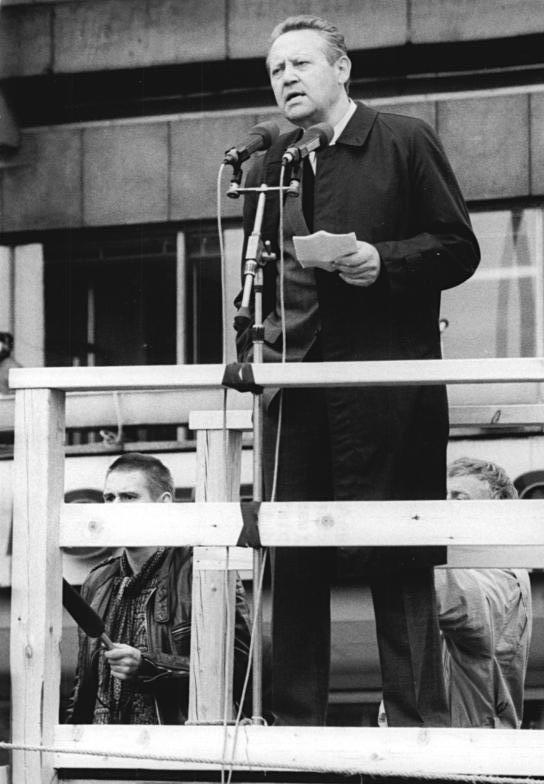
Günter Schabowski at the Alexanderplatz demonstration on 4 November 1989

In October 1989, Schabowski, along with several other members of the Politbüro, turned on the longtime SED leader Erich Honecker and forced him to step down in favor of Egon Krenz. As part of the effort to change the regime's image, Schabowski became the regime's unofficial spokesman and he held several daily press conferences to announce changes. He had already been in charge of media affairs for the Politbüro. He was also reportedly named the second man in the SED, Krenz's old role. Schabowski had spent most of his career in communist-style journalism in which reporters were told what to write after events had already happened. Thus, he found it somewhat difficult to get used to Western-style media practice.

On 9 November 1989, shortly before that day's press conference, Krenz handed Schabowski a text containing new, temporary travel regulations. The text stipulated that East German citizens could apply for permission to travel abroad without having to meet the previous requirements for those trips, and it allowed for permanent emigration across all border crossings, including those between East and West Berlin. The text was supposed to be embargoed until the next morning.

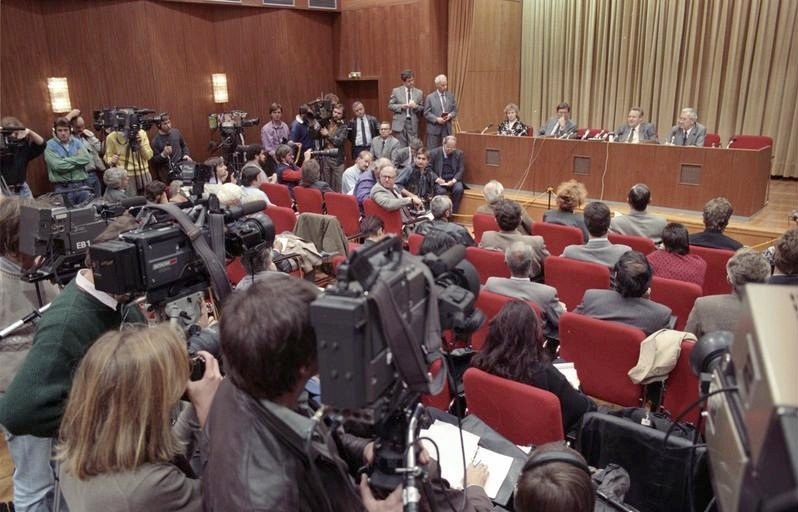
The 9 November 1989 press conference which led to the fall of the Wall. Schabowski is seated on stage, second from right. Riccardo Ehrman is seated on the floor of the stage with the table behind him.

Schabowski had not been on hand when Krenz read the text earlier in the day to several Politbüro members during a cigarette break at that day's Central Committee plenum or when it was discussed before the full committee. However, he felt comfortable discussing it at the press conference; he said later that all one needed to do to conduct a press conference was to be able to speak German and read a text without mistakes. Accordingly, he read the note aloud at the end of the press conference. One of the reporters asked when the regulations would come into effect. Schabowski assumed that it would be the same day based on the wording of the note, and he replied after a few seconds' pause: "As far as I know... effective immediately, without delay." (German: Das tritt nach meiner Kenntnis... ist das sofort... unverzüglich.) Accounts differ on who asked that question. Both Riccardo Ehrman, the Berlin correspondent of the ANSA news agency, and the German Bild Zeitung (a tabloid) reporter Peter Brinkmann were sitting in the front row at the press conference and claimed to have asked when the regulations would come into force.

Later, when asked whether the new regulations also applied to citizens from West Berlin travelling to the East, Schabowski looked at the text again and discovered that they did. When Daniel Johnson of The Daily Telegraph asked what that meant for the Berlin Wall, Schabowski sat frozen before giving a rambling statement about the wall being tied to the larger disarmament question.

After the press conference, Schabowski sat down for a live interview with NBC's Tom Brokaw. When Brokaw asked him if it was indeed true that East Germans could now travel without having to go through a third country, Schabowski replied in broken English that East Germans were "not further forced to leave GDR by transit through another country," and could now "go through the border." When Brokaw asked if this meant "freedom of travel," Schabowski replied, "Yes of course," and added that it was not "a question of tourism" but "a permission of leaving GDR."

The West German public national television channels showed parts of Schabowski's press conference in their main evening news reports at 19:17 on ZDF's heute and at 20:00 on ARD's Tagesschau, which meant that the news was broadcast to nearly all of East Germany as well, where West German television was widely watched. The news then spread, with news reports continuing to repeat the news throughout the night.

As the night progressed, thousands of East Berliners began proceeding to the six border crossings along the Berlin Wall and demanded to be let through. Live television reported on the gathering people which only increased the numbers of East Berliners coming to the gates. The crowds vastly outnumbered the border guards, who tried initially to stall for time. However, no one was willing to order deadly force. Finally, at 23:30, Stasi Officer Harald Jäger decided to open the gates at the Bornholmer Straße border crossing and to allow people into West Berlin.

The fall of the Berlin Wall was the key event leading to the end of the East German regime, a state that had been crumbling for many weeks as citizens had been fleeing through intermediate countries surrounding East Germany. Indeed, Victor Sebestyen later wrote that when the gates were opened, for all intents and purposes, East Germany "ceased to exist". He also wrote that many of Schabowski's colleagues suspected he was either an American or West German agent and could not believe that he had made "a simple cock-up". In 2014, his wife claimed that Schabowski had been well aware of the possible consequences of what he said in the press conference.

In the following purges of the "party's old guard", Schabowski was quickly expelled from the Party of Democratic Socialism, the successor to the SED, in an attempt to improve the party's image.

== Political life after reunification ==
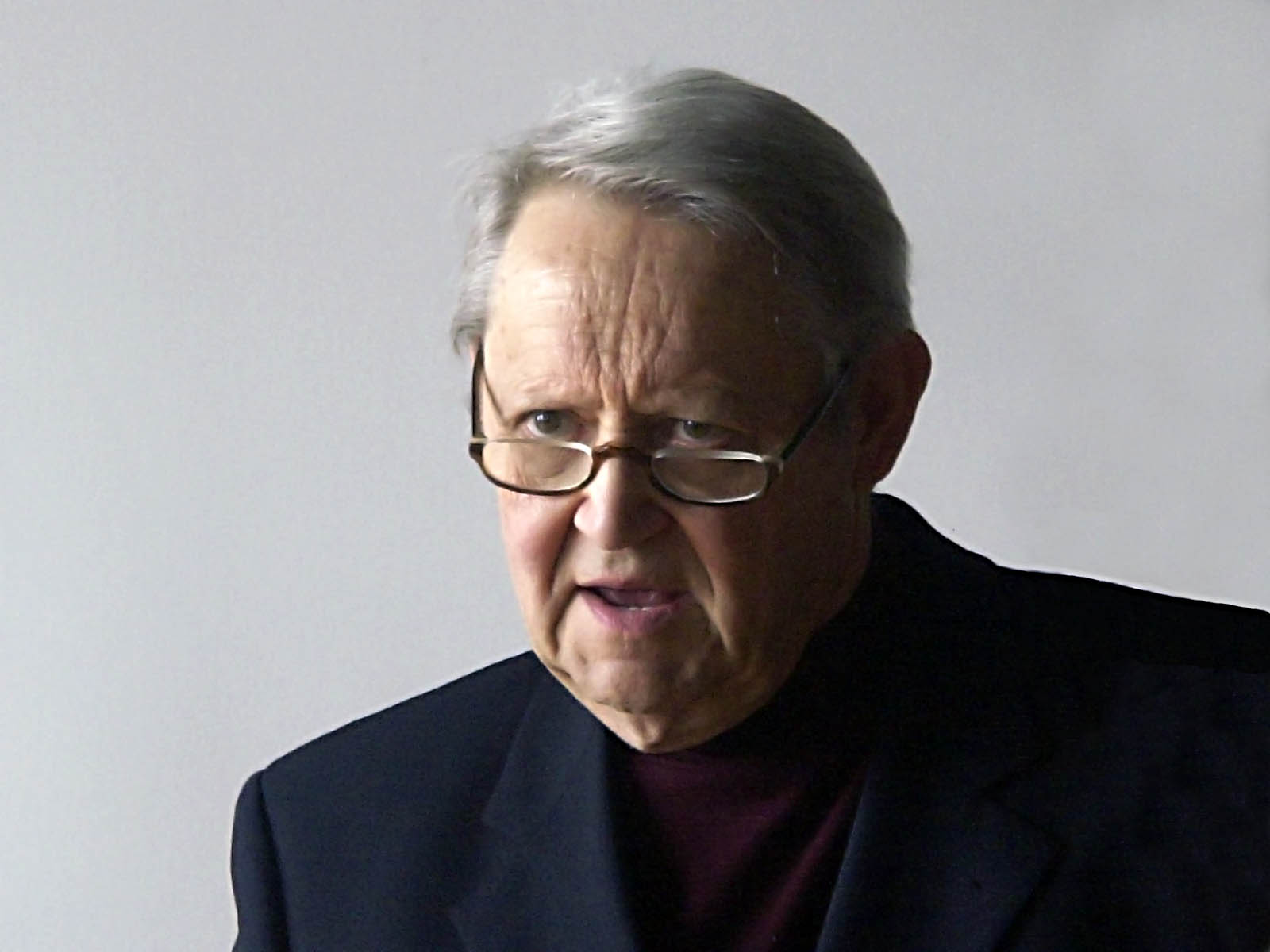
Schabowski in 2007

After German Reunification, Schabowski became highly critical of his own actions in East Germany and those of his fellow Politbüro members as well as of Soviet-style socialism in general. He worked again as a journalist and between 1992 and 1999, as editor for Heimat-Nachrichten, a weekly local paper that he co-founded with a West German journalist in Rotenburg an der Fulda.

His support for the Christian Democratic Union of Germany (CDU) prompted some of his former comrades to call him a wryneck (German: Wendehals). The word refers to a bird that can turn its head almost 180 degrees; it became a popular term used to mock communists who had turned capitalist.

Together with other leading figures of the GDR regime, he was charged with the murders of East Germans attempting to flee the GDR. In January 1995, Berlin prosecutors pressed charges against him. In August 1997, Schabowski was convicted along with Egon Krenz and Günther Kleiber. Because he accepted his moral guilt and denounced the GDR, he was sentenced to only three years in prison. In December 1999, he began serving his sentence in Hakenfelde Prison in Spandau. However, in September 2000, he was pardoned by Governing Mayor Eberhard Diepgen and released in December 2000 after he had served only a year. He was critical of the PDS/Left Party, the successor to the Socialist Unity Party. In 2001, he collaborated with Bärbel Bohley as advisor to Frank Steffel (CDU).

== Death ==
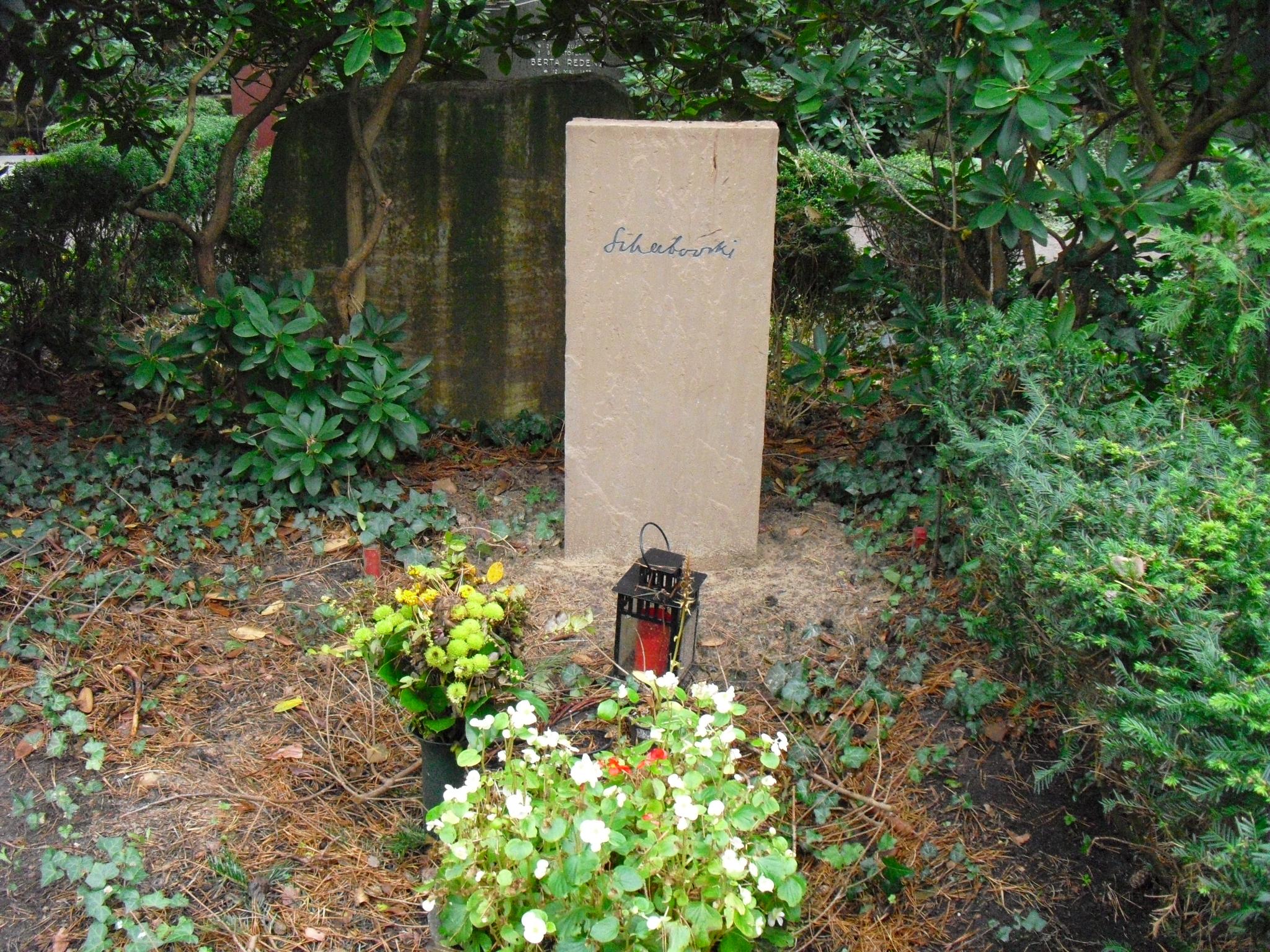
Günter Schabowski's gravestone, a slab of concrete from the Berlin Wall, in Waldfriedhof Dahlem

According to his wife, Schabowski lived in a Berlin nursing home during the last years of his life, after a number of heart attacks and strokes. He died in Berlin, after a long illness, on the morning of 1 November 2015, aged 86.
