= Riccardo Ehrman =

Italian journalist (1929–2021)

- Born: 4 November 1929; Florence, Tuscany, Italy
- Died: 14 December 2021 (aged 92); Madrid, Spain
- Occupation: Journalist

Riccardo Ehrman (4 November 1929 – 14 December 2021) was an Italian journalist whose question at a government press conference in the former East Germany is said to have precipitated the fall of the Berlin Wall.

== Early life ==
Ehrman was born on 4 November 1929 in Florence. His parents were Ukrainian Jews from Lemberg (now Lviv) who had decided to stay in Italy during their honeymoon. Aged 13, he was moved to Ferramonti di Tarsia internment camp. In September 1943, he was liberated by the British Army.

Ehrman studied law while being a reporter in Florence. He started as a correspondent for Associated Press in Rome, and later became a correspondent for Agenzia Nazionale Stampa Associata (ANSA), an Italian press agency.

== Career ==
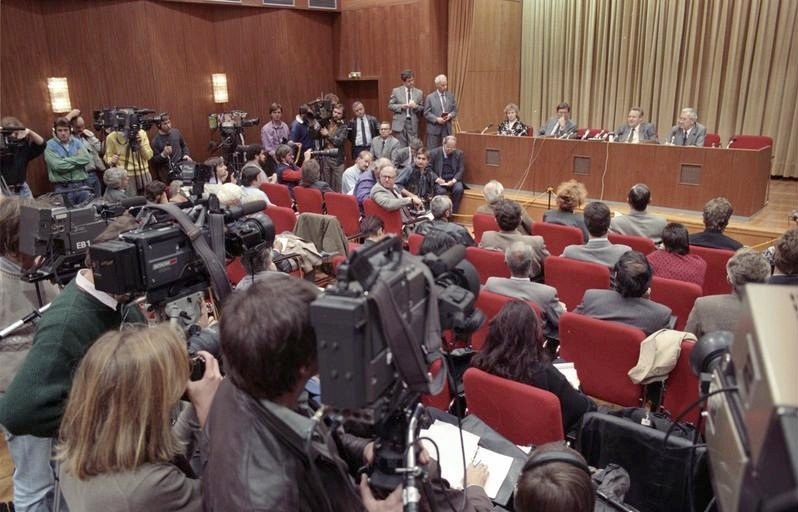
The press conference on 9 November 1989, Riccardo Ehrman is near the centre of the picture, sitting down in front of the desk.

While working for ANSA in Ottawa, Canada, Ehrmann was first sent to Berlin in 1976, but was confined for two months in Rome waiting for his visa to be accepted. That year he met a Spanish woman, whom he would marry in 1981. He was subsequently transferred to India.

In 1982, Ehrman briefly served as correspondent for East Germany. In 1985, ANSA asked him to return to East Berlin, due to his fluency in German. On 9 November 1989, he was summoned to a press conference at which the East German government was to announce that it would facilitate the mobility of citizens from East to West Germany.

At the end of the press conference, he asked Günter Schabowski, East German press secretary, when new travel restrictions were set to be lifted. After a few seconds, Schabowski replied "As far as I know … effective immediately, without delay." ("Das tritt nach meiner Kenntnis ... ist das sofort ... unverzüglich."). This was a mistake, because the note Schabowski read said that these measures would be lifted as of the following day. This led to a flood of East and West Germans converging on the wall and overwhelming border guards, eventually being let through. After the press conference with his question ended, Ehrman called the ANSA agency headquarters in Rome running shouting "The Berlin Wall has fallen!"

When Ehrman returned home, he received a phone call from the Italian Ambassador to East Germany enquiring what he did at the press conference. Peter Brinkmann, a West German colleague, claims credit as well, because he jumped in before Schabowski answered the question.

In 1991, Ehrman was assigned to Spain, where he remained after his retirement. In 2008, he was awarded the Order of Merit of the Federal Republic of Germany.

== Death ==
Ehrman died in Madrid on 14 December 2021, a month after his 92nd birthday.
