= Hans Jendretzky =

German politician (1897–1992)

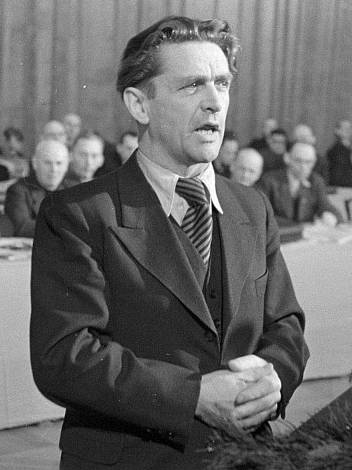
- Jendretzky in 1946

Chairman of the Neubrandenburg Bezirk Council
- In office December 1953 – February 1957
- Preceded by: Wilhelm Steudte
- Succeeded by: Horst Brasch

First Secretary of the Socialist Unity Party in Berlin
- In office 18 October 1948 – 8 August 1953 Serving with Ernst Hoffmann
- Preceded by: Hermann Matern
- Succeeded by: Alfred Neumann

Chairman of the Free German Trade Union Federation
- In office 9 February 1946 – 18 October 1948
- Preceded by: Office established
- Succeeded by: Herbert Warnke
Parliamentary constituencies
Member of the Volkskammer for Berlin
In office 16 November 1958 – 5 April 1990
Preceded by	Multi-member district
Succeeded by	Multi-member district
In office 18 March 1948 – 17 October 1954
Preceded by	Constituency established
Succeeded by	Multi-member district
Member of the Landtag of Prussia for Frankfurt an der Oder
In office 14 June 1928 – 25 May 1932
Preceded by	Multi-member district
Succeeded by	Multi-member district

Personal details
- Born: 20 July 1897 Berlin, Kingdom of Prussia, German Empire
- Died: 2 July 1992 (aged 94) Berlin, Germany
- Resting place: Zentralfriedhof Friedrichsfelde
- Party: USPD (1919–1920); KPD (1920–1946); SED (1946–1989); PDS (after 1989)
- Other political affiliations: FDGB
- Spouse(s): Margareta Michaelis (m. 1920; div. 1932) Marta Husemann; Irmgard Eisermann
- Occupation: Politician; Trade Unionist
- Central institution membership: 1950–1953: Candidate member, Politburo of the Central Committee; 1946–1953; 1957–1989: Full member, Central Committee; 1945–1946: Full member, KPD Central Committee

Gustav Ernst Hans Jendretzky (20 July 1897 – 2 July 1992) was a German communist politician and trade unionist. He was a prominent functionary of the Socialist Unity Party (SED) in the German Democratic Republic (East Germany).

== Political career ==
=== Weimar era ===
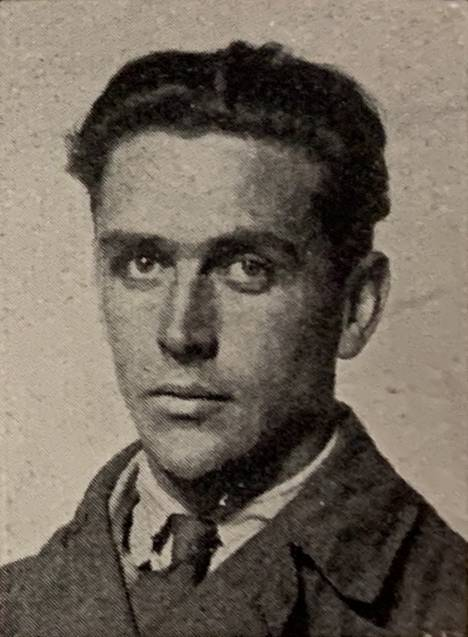
Jendretzky's official Landtag portrait, 1928

He became a member of the Independent Social Democratic Party of Germany in 1919 and of the Communist Party of Germany (KPD) in 1920. In the 1920s, he was one of the most prominents members of the KPD, and was head of the Roter Frontkämpferbund in Berlin-Brandenburg. He was a member of the Landtag of Prussia from 1928 to 1932 and served as secretary of the KPD's sub-district in Frankfurt an der Oder from 1929 to 1932.

=== Nazi era and imprisonment ===
In 1934, he was sentenced to three years of prison, being charged with "conspiracy to commit high treason."

=== Post-war career ===
After World War II, he became active in communist politics in the Soviet Occupation Zone, and was president of the Free German Trade Union Federation (FDGB) 1946-1948, First Secretary (head) of the East Berlin SED district from 1948 to 1953. He was a candidate to the politburo from 1950, deputy minister of the Interior from 1957 to 1960, a member of the SED central committee 1957-1989, member of the Volkskammer 1950-1954 and 1958-1989.

Jendretzky famously denounced the Freedom Bell in West Berlin, a gift from Americans as a sign of the fight against communism in Europe, as the "death bell", warning: "The rope of the death bell will become the gallows rope for those who ring it."

== Literature ==
- Hermann Weber/Andreas Herbst: Deutsche Kommunisten. Biographisches Handbuch 1918 bis 1945, Berlin: Karl Dietz Verlag 2004, S. 344-345 ISBN 3-320-02044-7
