= Paul Verner =

German politician (1911–1986)

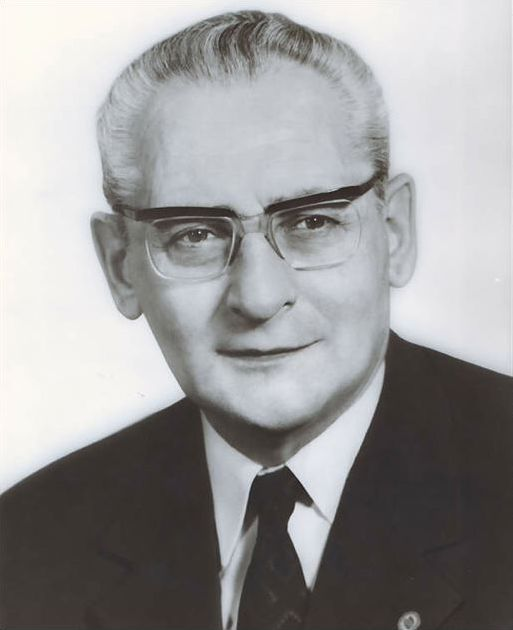
- Verner

First Secretary of the Socialist Unity Party in Berlin
- In office 28 February 1959 – 16 May 1971
- Second Secretary: Hans Kiefert; Hans Wagner; Konrad Naumann
- Preceded by: Hans Kiefert
- Succeeded by: Konrad Naumann

Head of the Central Committee West Department
- In office 1953–1958
- Secretary: Hermann Matern
- Preceded by: Alfred Zeidler (1949)
- Succeeded by: Arne Rehan
Volkskammer
Member of the Volkskammer for Zwickau-Stadt, Zwickau-Land (Karl-Marx-Stadt; 1967-1971)
In office 16 November 1958 – 12 December 1986
Preceded by	multi-member district
Succeeded by	Willy Hallbauer (1987)

Central Committee Secretariat responsibilities
- 1980–1983: State and Legal Affairs
- 1971–1984: Financial Management and Party Businesses
- 1971–1983: Youth
- 1971–1978: Women
- 1958–1984: Church Affairs
- 1971–1983; 1958–1967: Sports
- 1958–1967: Health Policy
- 1950–1953: All-German Affairs

Personal details
- Born: 26 April 1911 Chemnitz, Kingdom of Saxony, German Empire (now Germany)
- Died: 12 December 1986 (aged 75) East Berlin, East Germany
- Party: Socialist Unity Party (1946–1986)
- Other political affiliations: Communist Party of Germany (1929–1946)
- Occupation: Politician; Party Functionary; Journalist
- Awards: Patriotic Order of Merit; Order of Karl Marx; Order of Friendship of Peoples
- Central institution membership: 1963–1984: Full member, Politburo of the Central Committee; 1958–1963: Candidate member, Politburo of the Central Committee; 1950–1984: Full member, Central Committee; Other offices held: 1981–1984: Deputy Chairman, State Council; 1971–1986: Member, State Council; 1971–1983: Head, Youth Commission at the Politburo; 1963–1971: Member, East Berlin City Assembly of Deputies

Paul Verner (26 April 1911 – 12 December 1986) was a German communist politician. He joined the communist movement at a young age and went into exile during Adolf Hitler's rule. Verner became a prominent political personality in the German Democratic Republic after the war.

== Early life ==
Verner was born in Chemnitz in 1911. His father was a metal worker while his mother worked as a textile worker. Verner trained as metal worker like his father. At an early age, Verner joined the communist children's organization Jungspartakusbund (Young Spartacus League).

== Political activism ==
In 1925 he joined the Young Communist League of Germany (KJVD). In 1929 he became a member of the Communist Party of Germany (KPD). He worked as a volunteer in the communist publishing house Kämpfer-Verlag in Chemnitz. He became a member of the regional leadership of KJVD in Saxony. In 1932 he became editor of Junge Garde ('Young Guard').

== In exile ==
With the National Socialist takeover in Germany, Verner went into exile. Towards the end of 1933, he became a member of the Scandinavian Bureau of the Young Communist International, and edited Jugendinternationale (the German-language publication of the Young Communist International). In 1934 he shifted to Paris, where he became editor-in-chief of Junge Garde (now published in exile), a position he held until the spring of 1935. He moved to Belgium, as the KJVD reorganized.

Verner fought as a volunteer in the International Brigades in the Spanish Civil War. After the Spanish Civil War, he emigrated to Sweden. He was detained by Swedish authorities in Smedsbo, Värmland, between March 1940 and 1942. After being released from Smedsbo he began working as a metal worker in Sweden from August 1943.

== Political career in the GDR ==
After the end of the Second World War, he returned to Germany. During 1946 he was a co-founder, together with Hermann Axen and Erich Honecker, of the Free German Youth ("Freie Deutsche Jugend" / FDJ).

In 1958 Verner became a candidate member of the Socialist Unity Party of Germany (SED) politburo. He was also one of the secretaries of the party Central Committee. In March 1959 Verner became First Secretary of the Berlin district organization of SED, a powerful institution in the GDR. At the time the party district included West Berlin. Verner received criticism for the dismal performance of the party in West Berlin. Under Verner's leadership the West Berlin organizations were separated from the SED in 1961 (and would become the Socialist Unity Party of West Berlin).

Verner became a full Politburo member in 1963. For most of the 1970s and early 1980s, he was the second-ranking member of the SED hierarchy, and de facto the second most powerful man in the country after party leader Erich Honecker.

He died in Berlin on 12 December 1986.
