= Gregor Edelmann =

German journalist

Gregor Edelmann (born 1954) is a German journalist, screenwriter and dramaturge based in Berlin.

== Life ==
Edelmann was born in Suhl, an industrial town near Erfurt in the southern part of what was then the German Democratic Republic (East Germany). He studied Germanistics and, later, Dramaturgy. His teachers included Heiner Müller. Between 1981 and 1989, he was employed as a dramaturge for East German drama by Henschel-Theaterverlag (theatrical publishers) in Berlin.

Between 1988 and 2006, he lived with the actress Vera Oelschlegel. In 1990, together with the theatrical polymath André Plath, they founded the Theater des Ostens (Theatre of the East) which for nearly two decades recalled and celebrated the theatrical traditions of the separate Germany that had come to an end in 1990. Various directoral assignments ensured, notably Strindberg's Dance of Death and Racine's Phèdre.

Edelmann became a theatre critic with the Berliner Zeitung (newspaper) and started writing regularly for the mass circulation Bild-Zeitung. In 1996, he appeared as a press spokesman for Peter Zadek and Heiner Müller at the Berliner Ensemble. The focus of his subsequent work has been on screenwriting. He is the creator of the long-running television crime series Der letzte Zeuge (The last witness) on which he worked intensively between 1996 and 2006. More recently, between 2009 and 2012, he wrote 15 of the 22 episodes of the innovative psycho-police drama series, Flemming.
