= Vera Oelschlegel =

German actress and singer

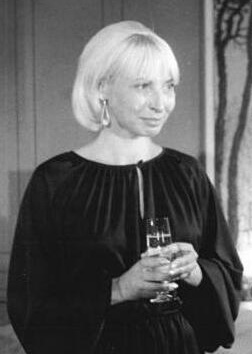
- Oelschlegel in 1980
- Born: Vera Franziska Oelschlegel; 5 July 1938 (age 88); Leipzig, Germany
- Occupations: Actress, singer, theatre director, drama director
- Spouse(s): Günther Rücker (1924–2008); Hermann Kant; Konrad Naumann (1928–1992)
- Children: 1

Vera Franziska Oelschlegel (born 5 July 1938) is a German actress, singer, artistic director, drama director and professor of drama at the Ernst Busch Academy of Dramatic Arts. She was a celebrity in East Germany before 1989. After that, from 1990 till 2013, she headed up the Theater des Ostens touring theatre company.

== Biography ==
Oelschlegel was born in Leipzig. Her mother, Ruth Oelschlegel (née Lauterbach, 1914–2014), was trained as a journalist. Her father, businessman Gottfried Oelschlegel (1910–1945), was killed in World War II. She attended the prestigious St. Thomas School in Leipzig, passing her school final exams (Abitur) in 1956. After that she studied between 1956 and 1959 at the acting faculty of the Babelsberg Film Academy, from which she emerged with a degree, and where she also served as the secretary for the faculty's Free German Youth section.

Between 1959 and 1961 she worked at the Putbus Theatre on the Island of Rügen on the country's north-east coast. Her first radio experience had involved women's broadcasts with Radio Leipzig, and in 1961 she became a member of the DFF ensemble, remaining in one form or another a member of the state television broadcaster's drama team between 1961 and 1974. In 1966 she was a founding member of "Ensemble 66". In 1976, she was a co-founder of the Palace Theatre (Theater im Palast / TiP) in Berlin, an experimental theatre project that attracted controversy in the East German establishment. Oelschlegel served as the theatre's intendant from 1976 till 1990. During the 1980s she worked with Corinna Harfouch as her "master student" at the TiP. Oelschlegel was also producing plays; she staged Dürrenmatt's Der Meteor and Shakespeare's Merry Wives of Windsor and King John, along with works by Peter Hacks and Ulrich Plenzdorf.

In 1981 Vera Oelschlegel began teaching at the Ernst Busch Academy of Dramatic Arts in Berlin where she conducted masterclasses in acting. In 1984 she became an honorary professor for acting at the academy.

Oelschlegel's notability rests as much on her own acting career as on her work in theatre administration, production and teaching. Both within East Germany and more widely, she became particularly known for her Brecht interpretations, especially during the 1960s and 70s. During her years at the TiP (theatre) she also organised art exhibitions, poetry readings and "composer-portraits".

The demise of the German Democratic Republic and the formal reunification of Germany a year later meant major upheavals psychologically and in practical terms for the old East German cultural elite. One response by Vera Oelschlegel was the publication of her autobiography, entitled "Wenn das meine Mutter wüsst" ("If my mother were to have known that"). The press response was mixed, with some critics complaining about details that had apparently been left out. The omissions that most troubled reviewers may well have been those involving Vera Oelschlegel's private life – all three of her husbands achieved notability as members of the East German elite – rather than those concerning her professional career. Her mother, Ruth Oelschlegel, had been closely involved in her daughter's early career, and her own work had concerned the management of East German performing artists more generally.

The Theater des Ostens ("Theatre of the East") touring theatre company was founded in 1991. Vera Oelschlegel served as its principal, its drama director and leading actress. Vera Oelschlegel's retirement from it in 2013 marked its ending. The company showcased East German drama, employing actors such as Hans-Peter Minetti and the playwright Heiner Müller. There was also a focus on the crowd-pleasing classics. In contrast to the world she had known at the prestigious Palace Theatre, the Theatre of the East operated without public subsidy and was frequently short of money. It toured extensively across countries where German is widely understood, including Switzerland, Austria, Italy, Luxembourg and the Netherlands.

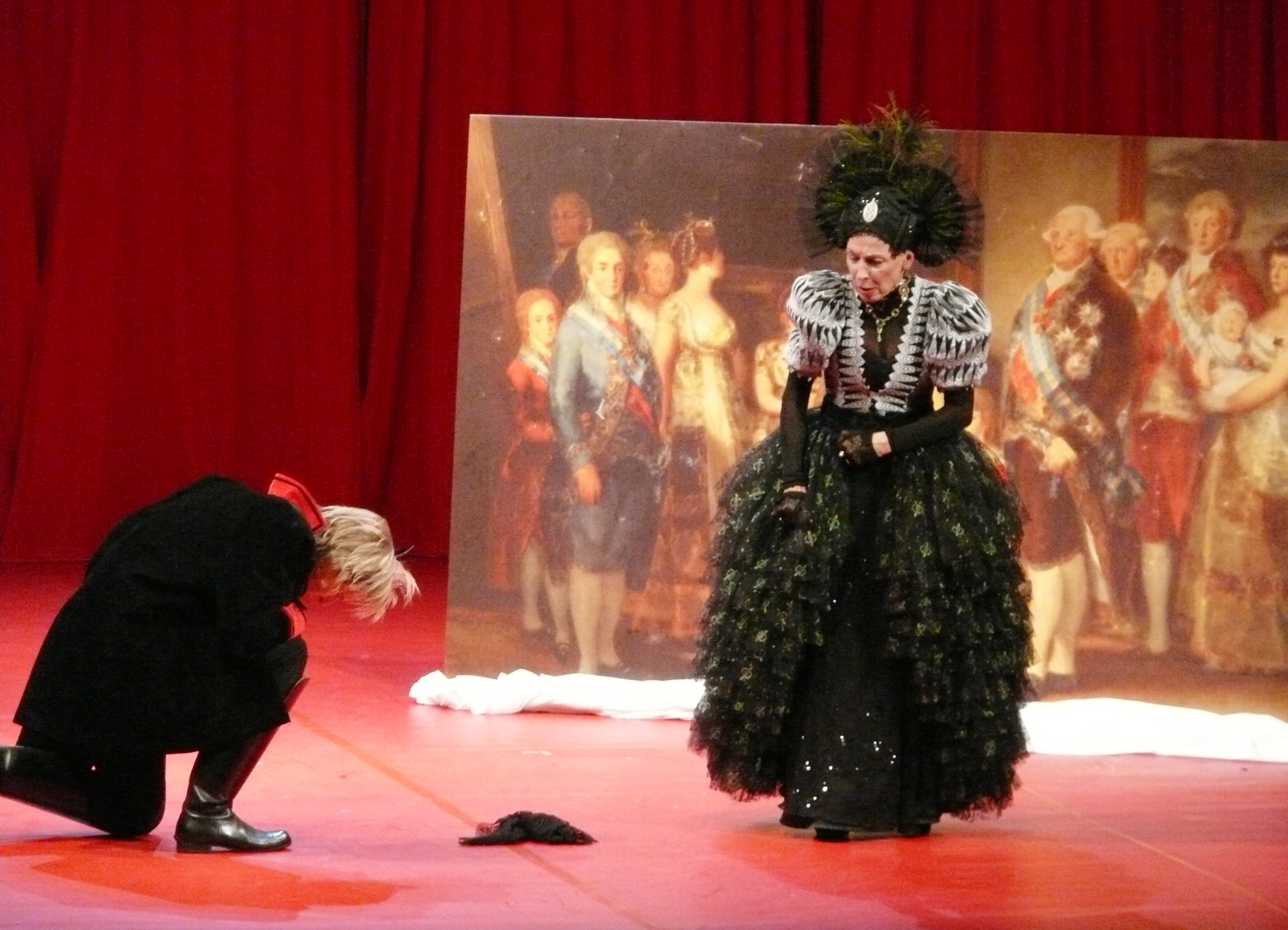
Oelschlegel (right) in Goya, October 2007

== Family ==
Vera Oelschlegel was one of her parents' three recorded children. One of her two brothers, Axel Oelschlegel (1942–1989), acquired a certain level of fame in East Germany as a novelist and journalist.

She has been married three times. Her first husband, to whom she was married between 1961 and 1967, was the dramatist-film director Günther Rücker. Between 1971 and 1976 she was married to the writer Hermann Kant. Her third marriage, between 1977 and 1987, was to the politician and senior Central Committee member, Konrad Naumann. Between 1988 and 2006 she lived with the screenwriter-journalist Gregor Edelmann. Her life partner since 2008 has been the architect and urbanist Fritz Stuber.
