= People's Economic Council =

The People's Economic Council (German: Volkswirtschaftsrat (VWR)) in the GDR was a central institution of the Council of Ministers of the GDR.

It was formed by the State Planning Commission in July 1961 as a spin-off of the Department of Industry and the Department of Material Supply. The purpose of the Council was to be an independent "central institution of the state" for the management of the central and local industry as well as for the "regulation of the fundamental issues of craft and service companies."

As the central institution for the planning and management of industry, VWR developed the annual plan for the industry on the basis of decisions of the Ministerial Council, the outlook plan, orientation indicators and the guidelines of the State Planning Commission. It was the task of VWR to implement the objectives set by the Socialist Unity Party of Germany Central Committee and the government principles of economic policy through its industry departments, the Association of State-owned Enterprises (German: Vereinigung Volkseigener Betriebe (VVB)), and the district economic councils.

The individual industry divisions of VWR were fully responsible for the preparation and accounting of the annual plan of their economic sector and instructed their assigned VVB, scientific institutes and design offices with regard to the responsibility and autonomy of the VVB. The VWR had decisional authority over the economic resource entities and district economic councils. Alfred Neumann was appointed as the first director of the VWR.

Over the course of development it proved to be inexpedient to oversee the growing industry from out of a centralized institution such as the VWR. Therefore, on 22 December 1965 the Council of Ministers decided to dissolve the VWR. Because of the 1965 dissolution, a range of industrial ministries were newly created or re-established.

== See also ==
- Economy of East Germany
