= 1981 East German general election =

- 14 June 1981

All 500 seats in the Volkskammer
- Turnout: 99.2% ▲0.6pp
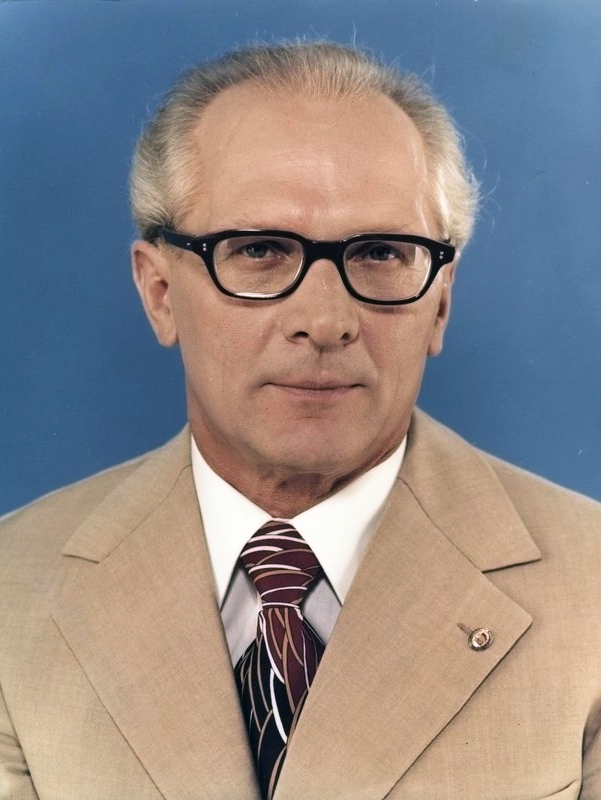
	Majority party
Leader	Erich Honecker
Party	SED
Alliance	National Front
Seats won	127
Seat change	Steady
- Results of the election.
Chairman of the Council of Ministers before election
Willi Stoph
SED
Chairman of the Council of Ministers after election
Willi Stoph
SED

General elections were held in East Germany on 14 June 1981.

500 deputies were elected to the Volkskammer, with all of them being candidates of the single-list National Front. 679 Front candidates were put forward, with 500 being elected and 179 becoming substitute deputies.

This was the first election where East Berlin's Volkskammer members were directly "elected". Until then, East Berlin's Volkskammer members (66 in 1976) were chosen indirectly by the city government, the Magistrate of East Berlin, though since 1976, they had the same rights as regular Volkskammer members. For the purpose of the 1981 election, five new multi-member constituencies were set up in East Berlin that elected between 6 (Berlin-Prenzlauer Berg) and 11 (Berlin-Marzahn, Berlin-Lichtenberg) deputies. Three Politburo members (Alfred Neumann, Joachim Herrmann and Konrad Naumann) switched constituencies to be elected as first-placed candidates in East Berlin constituencies.

At its first session on 25 June, the Volkskammer re-elected Willi Stoph as Chairman of the Council of Ministers, while Erich Honecker, General Secretary of the ruling Socialist Unity Party, was also re-elected Chairman of the Council of State.

Like all East German elections before the Peaceful Revolution, this election was neither free nor fair. Voters were only presented with a closed list of candidates (pre-approved by the SED Central Committee Secretariat) put forward by the National Front. The list predetermined an outcome whereby the SED had both the largest faction in the Volkskammer and a majority of its members, as almost all of the Volkskammer members elected for one of the mass organizations were also members of the SED (in this election, all but 4 out of the 165 mass organization Volkskammer members were SED members). While voters could reject the list, they would have to use the polling booth, the use of which was documented by Stasi informants located at every polling site, and had to cross out every name, as "Yes" and "No" boxes were removed after the 1950 election. Abstaining from voting was also seen as oppositional and punished. While legally permissible according to East German election laws, widespread election monitoring was not done out of fear for repression until the 1989 local elections.

== Results ==
Party or alliance		Votes	%	Seats	+/–
National Front	Socialist Unity Party of Germany	12,235,515	99.86	127	0
National Front	Free German Trade Union Federation	12,235,515	99.86	68	0
National Front	Christian Democratic Union	12,235,515	99.86	52	0
National Front	Liberal Democratic Party of Germany	12,235,515	99.86	52	0
National Front	National Democratic Party of Germany	12,235,515	99.86	52	0
National Front	Democratic Farmers' Party of Germany	12,235,515	99.86	52	0
National Front	Free German Youth	12,235,515	99.86	40	0
National Front	Democratic Women's League of Germany	12,235,515	99.86	35	0
National Front	Cultural Association of the GDR	12,235,515	99.86	22	0
Against		16,613	0.14	–	–
Total		12,252,128	100.00	500	0
Valid votes		12,252,128	99.98		
Invalid/blank votes		2,878	0.02		
Total votes		12,255,006	100.00		
Registered voters/turnout		12,352,263	99.21		
Source: IPU
