= East Berlin District Committee of the Socialist Unity Party of Germany =

The East Berlin District Committee of the Socialist Unity Party of Germany was the position of highest authority in the district of East Berlin, having more power than the Mayor of East Berlin. The position was created on April 21, 1946 and abolished in 1989, following the fall of the Berlin Wall. The First Secretary was a de facto appointed position usually by the Politburo or the General Secretary himself.

== First Secretaries ==
Name	Term of Office		Life years
Name	Start	End	Life years
Hermann Matern	21 April 1946	18 October 1948	1893–1971
Hans Jendretzky	18 October 1948	8 August 1953	1897–1992
Alfred Neumann	8 August 1953	16 February 1957	1909–2001
Hans Kiefert	16 February 1957	28 February 1959	1905–1966
Paul Verner	28 February 1959	16 May 1971	1911–1986
Konrad Naumann	16 May 1971	5 November 1985	1929–1992
Helmut Müller (acting)	5 November 1985	25 November 1985	1930–2019
Günter Schabowski	25 November 1985	14 November 1989	1929–2015
Heinz Albrecht	14 November 1989	11 February 1990	1935–

== See also ==
- History of Berlin
- East Berlin
- Socialist Unity Party of West Berlin
- Governing Mayor of Berlin
- Leadership of East Germany
