= East Berlin =

Capital of East Germany (1949–1990)

East Berlin Ost-Berlin Berlin (Ost) Demokratischer Sektor von Berlin Berlin, Hauptstadt der DDR
- 1949–1990
- Flag Coat of arms

- East Berlin (red) within East Germany
- Status: Capital of East Germany (Note: Partially recognised; seen by the Western Bloc as the Soviet-occupied portion of Berlin)
- First Secretary
  - 1948–1953: Hans Jendretzky
  - 1953–1957: Alfred Neumann
  - 1957–1959: Hans Kiefert
  - 1959–1971: Paul Verner
  - 1971–1985: Konrad Naumann
  - 1985–1989: Günter Schabowski
  - 1989–1990: Heinz Albrecht
- Lord Mayor
  - 1948–1967: Friedrich Ebert Jr. (SED)
  - 1967–1974: Herbert Fechner (SED)
  - 1974–1990: Erhard Krack (SED)
  - 1990: Ingrid Pankraz (PDS)
  - 1990: Christian Hartenhauer (PDS)
  - 1990–1991: Tino Schwierzina (SPD)
  - 1991: Thomas Krüger (SPD)
- Historical era: Cold War
  - Establishment of East Germany: 7 October 1949
  - Reunification: 3 October 1990

Area
  - Total: 403 km^{2} (156 sq mi)

Population
  - 1946: 1,174,582
  - 1961: 1,055,283
  - 1989: 1,279,212
Preceded by	Succeeded by
Allied-occupied Germany	Berlin
- Today part of: Germany

East Berlin (German: Ost-Berlin; pronounced [ˈɔstbɛʁˌliːn]) was the capital of East Germany (GDR) from 1949 to 1990. From 1945, it was the Soviet occupation sector of Berlin. The American, British, and French sectors were known as West Berlin. From 13 August 1961 until 9 November 1989, East Berlin was separated from West Berlin by the Berlin Wall. The Western Allied powers did not recognize East Berlin as the GDR's capital, nor the GDR's authority to govern East Berlin. For most of its administrative existence, East Berlin was officially known as Berlin, capital of the GDR (German: Berlin, Hauptstadt der DDR) by the GDR government. On 3 October 1990, the day Germany was officially reunified, East and West Berlin formally reunited as the city of Berlin.

== Overview ==
With the London Protocol of 1944 and subsequent Potsdam Conference in 1945, the Allied powers of the United States, the United Kingdom, and the Soviet Union decided to divide Germany into three occupation zones and to establish a special area of Berlin, which was occupied by the three Allied Forces together. In May 1945, the Soviet Union installed a city government for the whole city that was called "Magistrate of Greater Berlin", which existed until 1947. After the war, the Allied Forces initially administered the city together within the Allied Kommandatura, which served as the governing body of the city. However, in 1948 the Soviet representative left the Kommandatura and the common administration broke apart during the following months. In the Soviet sector, a separate city government was established, which continued to call itself the "Magistrate of Greater Berlin".

When the German Democratic Republic was established in 1949, it immediately claimed Berlin as its capital—a claim that was recognized by all communist countries. Nevertheless, East Berlin representation in the Volkskammer initially only consisted of non-voting delegates, indirectly elected by the Magistrate, until an amendment to the electoral law providing for direct elections was passed on June 28, 1979, taking effect on June 14, 1981.

In June 1948, all railways and roads leading to West Berlin were blocked, and East Berliners were not allowed to emigrate. Nevertheless, more than 1,000 East Germans were escaping to West Berlin each day by 1960, caused by the strains on the East German economy from war reparations owed to the Soviet Union, massive destruction of industry, and lack of assistance from the Marshall Plan. In August 1961, the East German Government tried to stop the population exodus by separating West Berlin by the Berlin Wall. It was very dangerous for fleeing residents to cross because armed soldiers were trained to shoot illegal emigrants.

East Germany was a socialist republic. Eventually, Christian churches were allowed to operate without restraint after years of harassment by authorities. In the 1970s, the wages of East Berliners rose and working hours fell.

The Soviet Union and the Communist Bloc recognized East Berlin as the GDR's capital. However, Western Allies (the United States, United Kingdom, and France) never formally acknowledged the authority of the East German government to govern East Berlin. Official Allied protocol recognized only the authority of the Soviet Union in East Berlin in accordance with the occupation status of Berlin as a whole. The United States Command Berlin, for example, published detailed instructions for U.S. military and civilian personnel wishing to visit East Berlin. In fact, the three Western commandants regularly protested against the presence of the East German National People's Army in East Berlin, particularly on the occasion of military parades. Nevertheless, the three Western Allies eventually established embassies in East Berlin in the 1970s, although they never recognized it as the capital of East Germany. Treaties instead used terms such as "seat of government".

On 3 October 1990, East and West Germany and East and West Berlin were reunited, thus formally ending the existence of East Berlin. Citywide elections in December 1990 resulted in the first "all-Berlin" mayor being elected to take office in January 1991, with the separate offices of mayors in East and West Berlin expiring at the time, and Eberhard Diepgen (a former mayor of West Berlin) became the first elected mayor of a reunited Berlin.

== Historical population ==
East Berlin reached its highest population in 1988 with 1.28 million. The lowest value was in 1961, the year the Berlin Wall was built, with under 1.06 million registered. The figures in the following table, unless otherwise indicated, are from the official central statistical office of East Germany.

Date	Population
29 October 1946 ¹	1,174,582
31 August 1950 ¹	1,189,074
31 December 1955	1,139,864
31 December 1960	1,071,775
31 December 1961	1,055,283
31 December 1964 ¹	1,070,731

Date	Population
1 January 1971 ¹	1,086,374
31 December 1975	1,098,174
31 December 1981 ¹	1,162,305
31 December 1985	1,215,586
31 December 1988	1,284,535
31 December 1989	1,279,212

== Post-reunification ==
Since reunification, the German government has spent vast amounts of money on reintegrating the two halves of the city and bringing services and infrastructure in the former East Berlin up to the standard established in West Berlin.

After reunification, the East German economy suffered significantly. Under the adopted policy of privatization of state-owned firms under the auspices of the Treuhandanstalt, many East German factories were shut down—which also led to mass unemployment—due to gaps in productivity with and investment compared to West German companies, as well as an inability to comply with West German pollution and safety standards in a way that was deemed cost-effective. Because of this, a massive amount of West German economic aid was poured into East Germany to revitalize it. This stimulus was part-funded through a 7.5% tax on income for individuals and companies (in addition to normal income tax or company tax) known as the Solidaritätszuschlaggesetz (SolZG) or "solidarity surcharge", which though only in effect for 1991–1992 (later reintroduced in 1995 at 7.5 and then dropped down to 5.5% in 1998 and continues to be levied to this day) led to a great deal of resentment toward the East Germans.

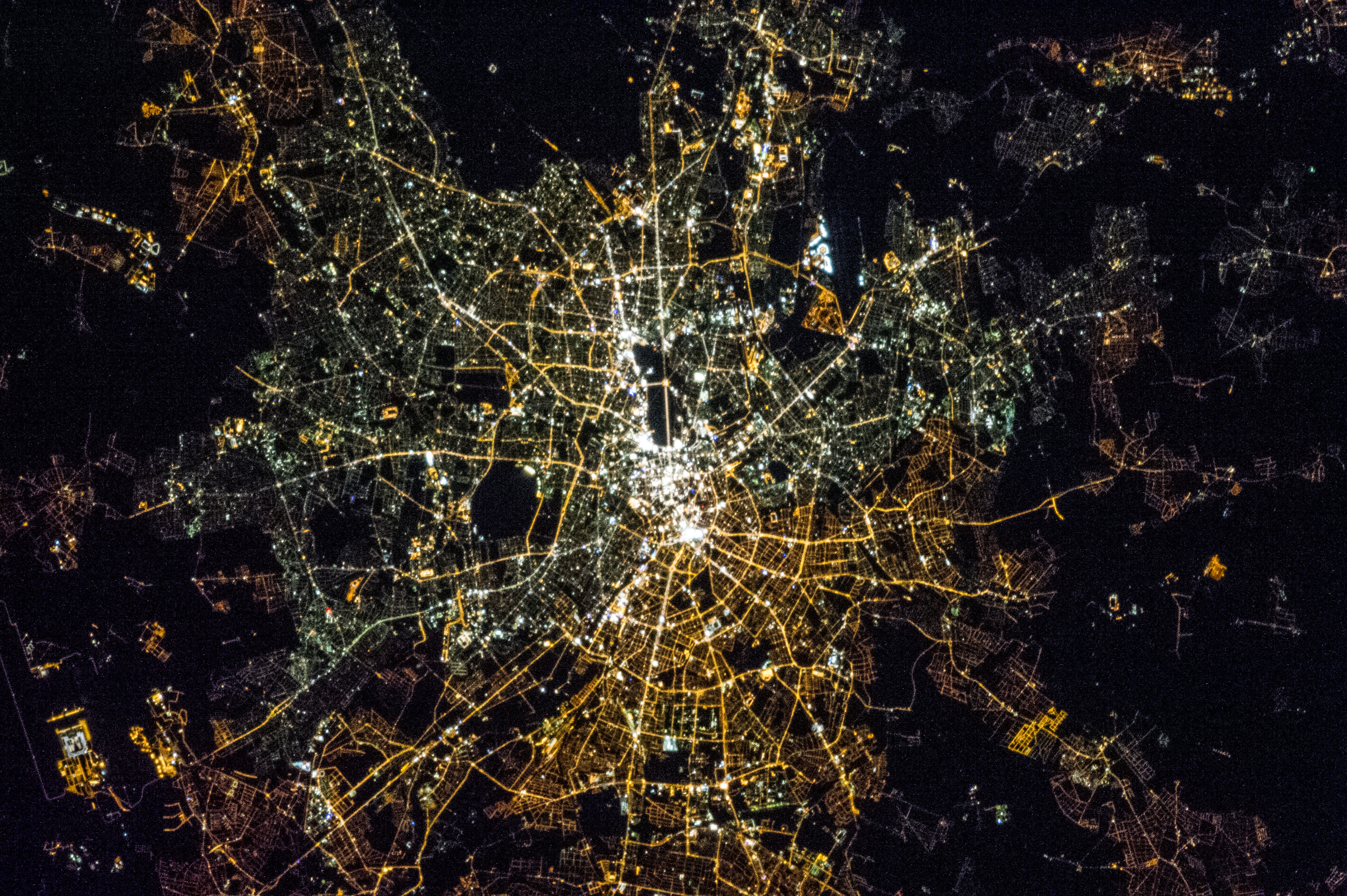
West (upper part of image) and East Berlin (lower part of image) viewed from space in 2013.

Despite the large sums of economic aid poured into East Berlin, there still remain obvious differences between the former East and West Berlins. East Berlin has a distinct visual style; this is partly due to the greater survival of prewar façades and streetscapes, with some still showing signs of wartime damage. The unique look of Socialist Classicism that was used in East Berlin (along with the rest of the former GDR) also contrasts markedly with the urban development styles employed in the former West Berlin. Additionally, the former East Berlin (along with the rest of the former GDR) retains a small number of its GDR-era street and place names commemorating German socialist heroes, such as Karl-Marx-Allee, Rosa-Luxemburg-Platz, and Karl-Liebknecht-Straße. Many such names, however, were deemed inappropriate (for various reasons) and, through decommunization, changed after a long process of review (so, for instance, Leninallee reverted to Landsberger Allee in 1991, and Dimitroffstraße reverted to Danziger Straße in 1995).

Another symbolic icon of the former East Berlin (and of East Germany as a whole) is the Ampelmännchen (tr. "little traffic light men"), a stylized version of a fedora-wearing man crossing the street, which is found on traffic lights at many pedestrian crosswalks throughout the former East. Following a civic debate about whether the Ampelmännchen should be abolished or disseminated more widely (due to concerns of consistency), several crosswalks in some parts of the former West Berlin began to employ the Ampelmännchen.

Twenty-five years after the two cities were reunified, the people of East and West Berlin still had noticeable differences between them, and these differences became more apparent among the older generations. The two groups also had sometimes-derogatory slang terms to refer to each other. A former East Berliner (or East German) was known as an "Ossi" (from the German word for east, Ost), and a former West Berliner (or West German) was known as a "Wessi" (from the German word for west, West). Both sides also engaged in stereotyping the other. A stereotypical Ossi had little ambition or poor work ethic and was chronically bitter, while a stereotypical Wessi was arrogant, selfish, impatient and pushy.

== Boroughs ==
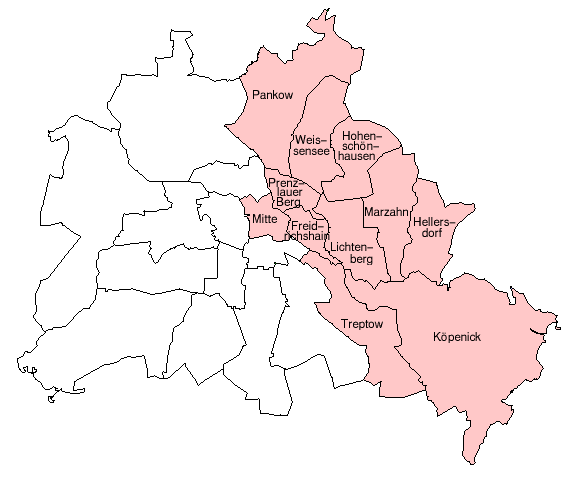
Boroughs of East Berlin (as of 1987)

At the time of German reunification, East Berlin comprised the boroughs of

Boroughs of East Berlin in 1986
Area Code	Borough	Population	Party secretary	Borough Mayor	Notes
1501	Mitte	80,355	Günter Kaiser	Gottfried Kroschwald	
1504	Prenzlauer Berg	166,680	Stefanie Leinkauf	Harry Gnilka	
1505	Friedrichshain	133,636	Heinz Kimmel	Manfred Pagel	
1509	Marzahn	158,480	Peter Faltin	Gerd Cyske	Formed in 1979 from parts of Lichtenberg
1510	Hohenschönhausen	84,780	Hans-Joachim Schmidt	Wilfried Franke	Formed in 1985 from parts of Weißensee
1511	Hellersdorf	59,887	unknown	Hans-Günther Burbach	Formed in 1986 from parts of Marzahn
1515	Treptow	111,072	Herbert Troschka	Günter Polauke	
1516	Köpenick	119,991	Lothar Witt	Horst Stranz	
1517	Lichtenberg	183,617	Horst Babeliowsky	Günter Milke	
1518	Weißensee	60,576	Arno Wendel	Ingeborg Podßuweit	Expanded to include parts of Pankow in 1986
1519	Pankow	118,067	Rolf Körte	Hans Walter	

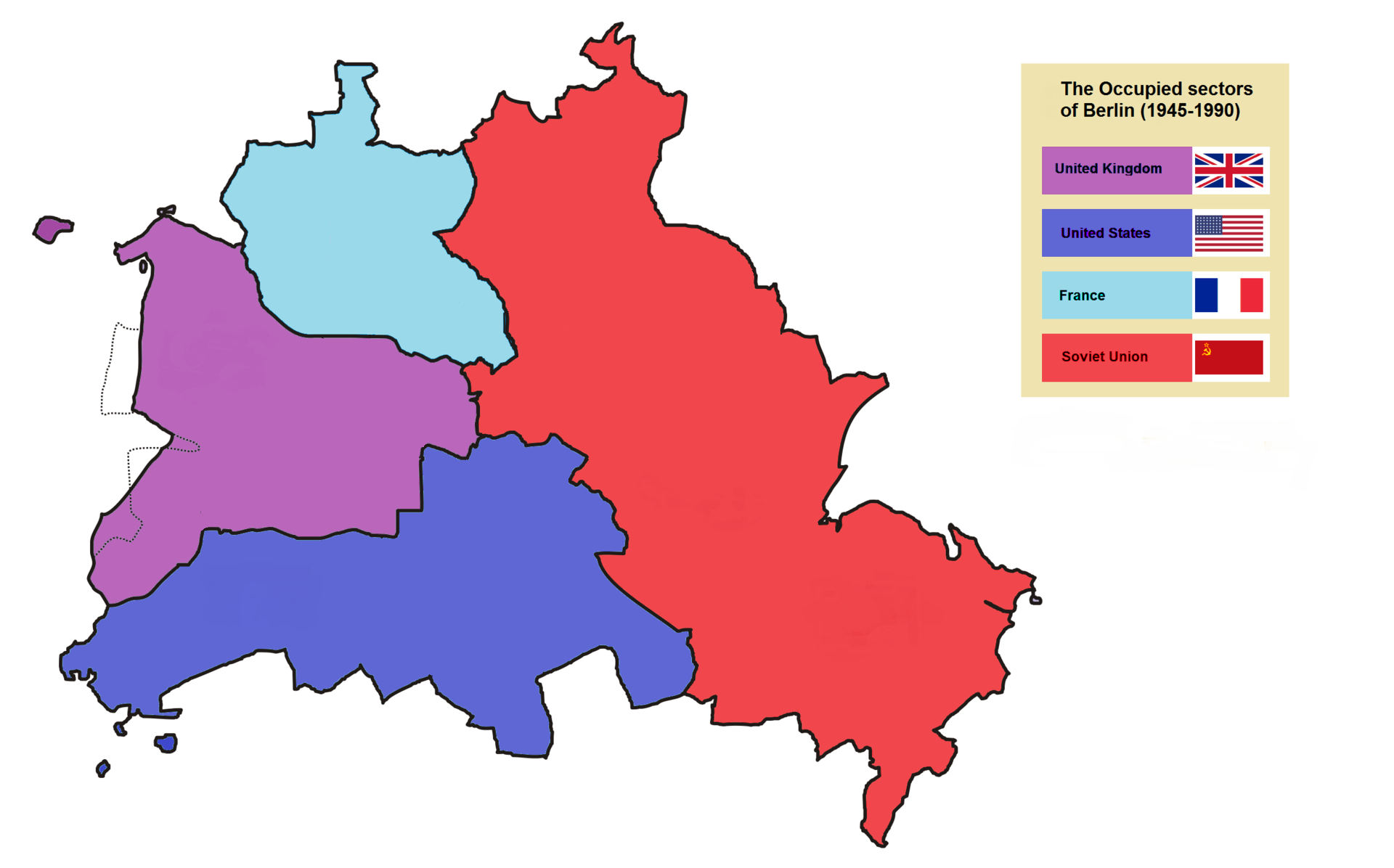
The occupied sectors of Berlin

== Government ==
=== Assembly of Deputies ===
The legislature of East Berlin was the City Assembly of Deputies (German: Stadtverordnetenversammlung) (SVV), which had 130 members elected every five years alongside the Volkskammer and the legislatures of the other Bezirke of East Germany. The assembly met in the Red City Hall, which also housed the Magistrate of East Berlin. The actual significance of the assembly was little, the assembly being in session only a few times per year to unanimously approve decisions made by the SED and the Magistrate.

The assembly was first "elected" in October 1954 concurrently with the second Volkskammer. After not having had a legislature at all since the split in 1948, there briefly was an "People's Assembly of Greater Berlin" from February 1953, composed of Democratic Bloc-appointed members.

As with all elections before the Peaceful Revolution, elections in East Berlin were neither free nor fair, voters only being able to approve or reject a list of candidates put forward by the National Front. While voters could reject the list, they would have to use the polling booth, the use of which was documented by Stasi informants located at every polling site.

=== Magistrate ===
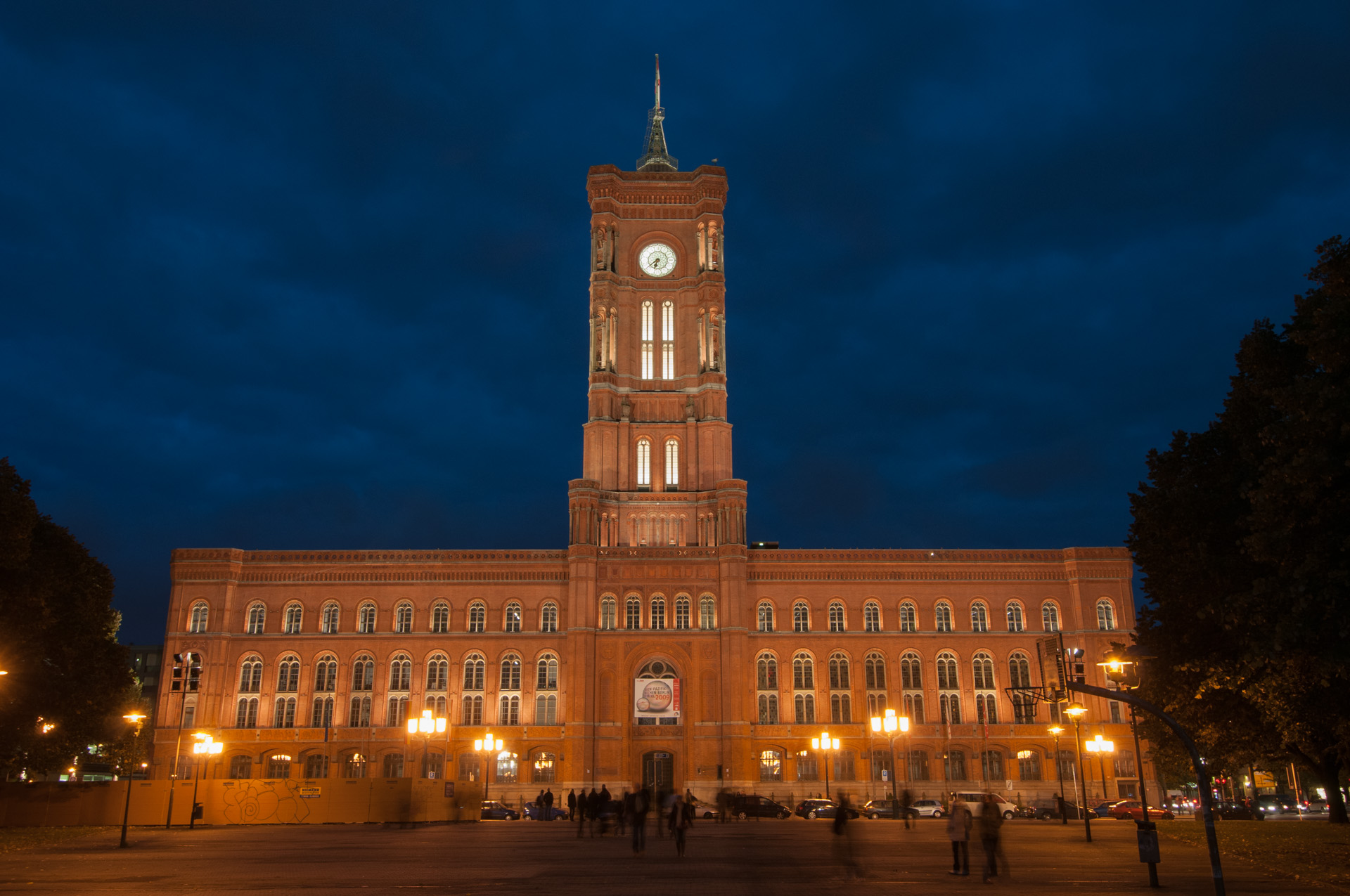
The Red City Hall in 2009

After each election, the East Berlin assembly elected the Magistrate of East Berlin (German: Magistrat von Berlin, Hauptstadt der DDR), the municipal government of East Berlin. The Magistrate also controlled the work of the borough governments, which, among other things, were exclusively responsible for running elections. The Magistrate was originally composed of the Lord Mayor of East Berlin as chairman, eight deputy mayors, the Magistrate secretary (who prepared the meetings of the assembly and Magistrate and controlled the implementation of their decisions), and eight other members known as city councilors (German: Stadtrat).

With the exception of the Lord Mayor, his first deputy and the Magistrate secretary, all Magistrate members headed one of the 15 governmental departments. These departments were accountable to both the Magistrate and the respective ministry (for example, the East Berlin health department was directly accountable to the East German health ministry) under the legal principal of Doppelte Unterstellung.

Above all, the Magistrate was subservient to the East Berlin SED and its First Secretary.

Magistrate of East Berlin (1984)
Member	Position	Party	Portfolio	Notes
Erhard Krack	Lord Mayor	SED	N/A	
Hannelore Mensch	First Deputy Mayor	SED	N/A	Served from June 1978 to December 1989 and was also responsible for mass rallies, managing relations with other State institutions, the first deputy borough mayors and persecutees of the Nazi regime.
Wolfgang Bein	Deputy Mayor	NDPD	Housing Policy	
Joachim Böttger	Deputy Mayor	SED	Construction	Removed from office on 11 April 1985 and was briefly succeeded by Günter Schelle, then by Hans Lederer, in June 1986.
Wolfgang Budnik	Deputy Mayor	SED	Municipal Supply	
Hans-Günter Burbach	Deputy Mayor	SED	Berlin Bezirk Planning Commission	Left as Magistrate after being elected inaugural borough mayor of Hellersdorf on 25 June 1986 and was succeeded by Wolfgang Puppe.
Günter Hoffmann	Deputy Mayor	SED	Internal Affairs	appointed 17 October 1976 and served until 30 May 1990
Herbert Meyer	Deputy Mayor	SED	Trade and Supply	
Dieter Müller	Deputy Mayor	SED	Coordination of Building Projects	left as magistrate in December 1987, appointed First Secretary of the Karl-Marx-Stadt SED
Wolfgang Schmahl	Deputy Mayor	CDU	International Relations	
Fritz Schmaler	Deputy Mayor	SED	Bezirk-managed and Food Industry	
Roland Tränkner	Deputy Mayor	LDPD	Tourism and Berlin Advertising	Promoted to be responsible for Environmental Protection, Recreation and Tourism, by December 1989.
Kurt Schumann	Secretary	SED	N/A	
Wilfried Franke	City Councilor	SED	Labor and Wages	Left as magistrate on 1 September 1985, to be made the inaugural borough mayor of Hohenschönhausen.
Herbert Goerze	City Councilor	DBD	none	honorary member
Günther Herbert	City Councilor	SED	Workers Supply and Canteens	
Gerhard Jacob	City Councilor	SED	Health	Served from 1975 to 1986 and was succeeded by Geerd Dellas. The head of the health department also held the title of Bezirksarzt since 1962.
Alfred Köhler	City Councilor	SED	Traffic and Telecommunications	Served from December 1978 to 24 June 1986 and was succeeded by Günter Manow.
Jürgen Naumann	City Councilor	SED	Youth, Physical Culture and Sports	
Thomas Naumann	City Councilor	SED	Agriculture, Forestry and Foodstuffs	
Herta Otto	City Councilor	SED	Public Education	
Walter Rubner	City Councilor	SED	Finance	
Walter Scholz	City Councilor	SED	none	
Jürgen Schuchardt	City Councilor	SED	Culture	Served from June 1978 to January 1985 and was briefly succeeded by Helga Rönsch, then by Christian Hartenhauer, in June 1986.
Hermann Wern	City Councilor	SED	Chief for Construction, Berlin-Marzahn	

Until 1981, the Magistrate also formally appointed the 66 East Berlin Volkskammer members.

== Images ==
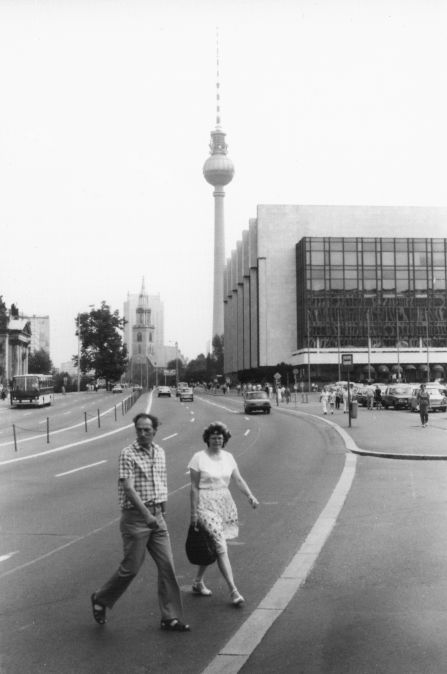
Marx-Engels-Platz and the Palace of the Republic in East Berlin in the summer of 1989. The Fernsehturm (TV Tower) is visible in the background

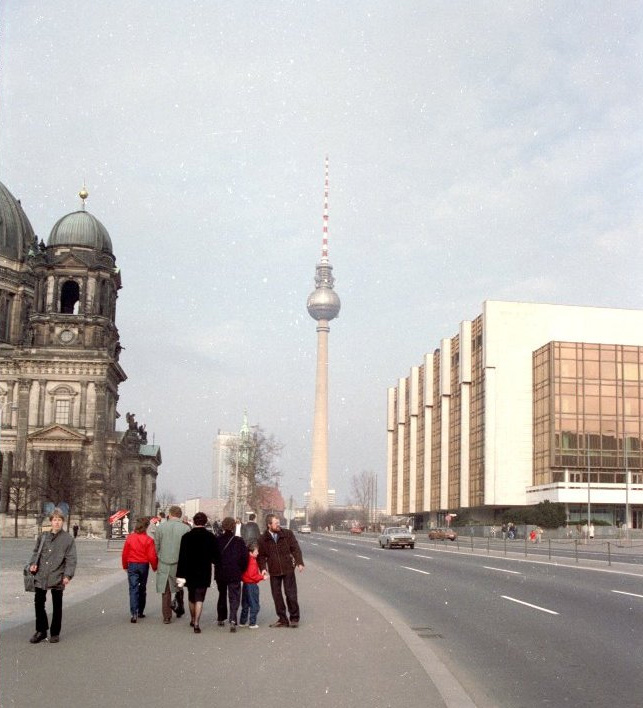
Easter Sunday, 1988, Fernsehturm and Palace of the Republic

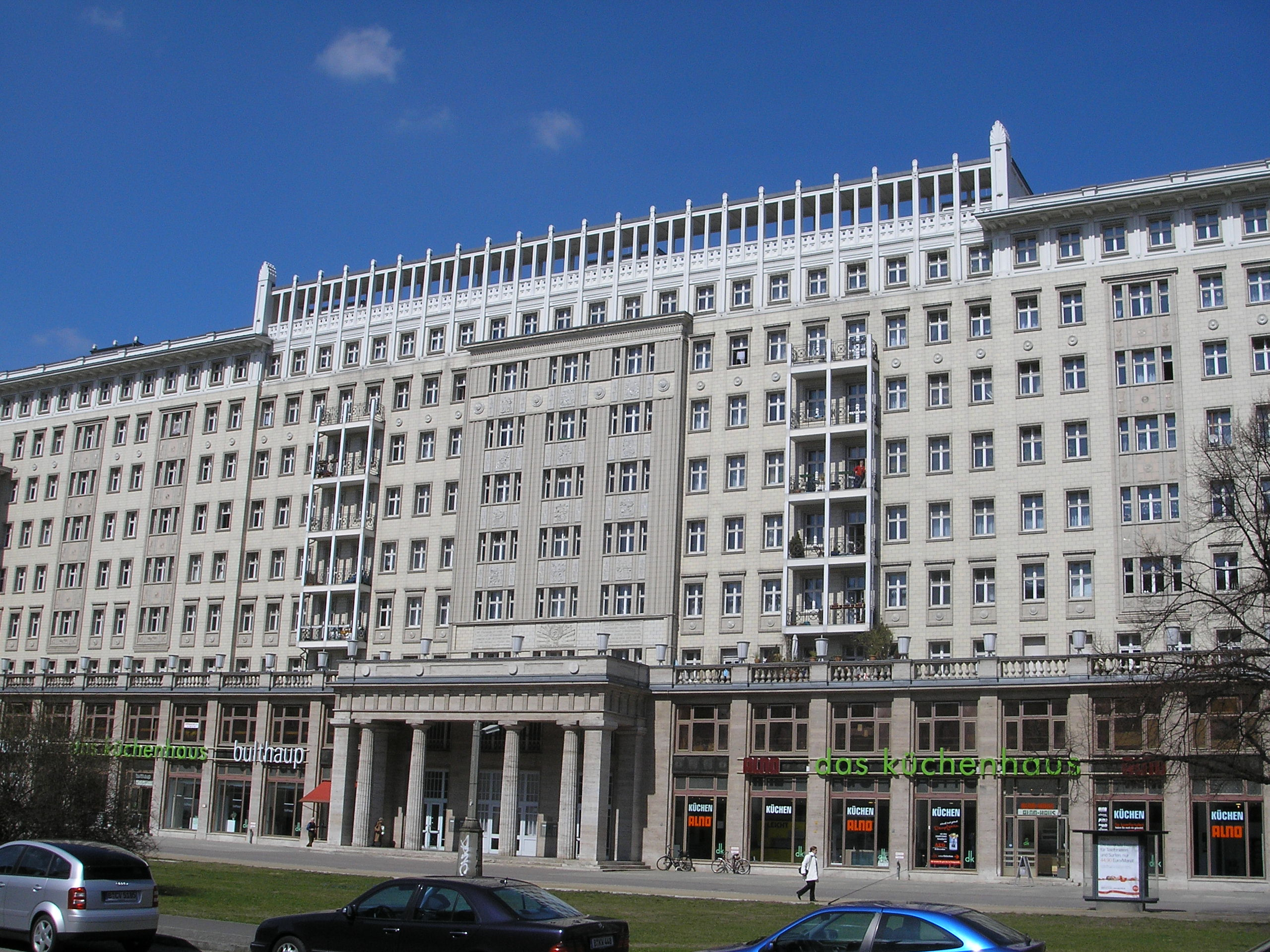
Karl-Marx-Allee apartments

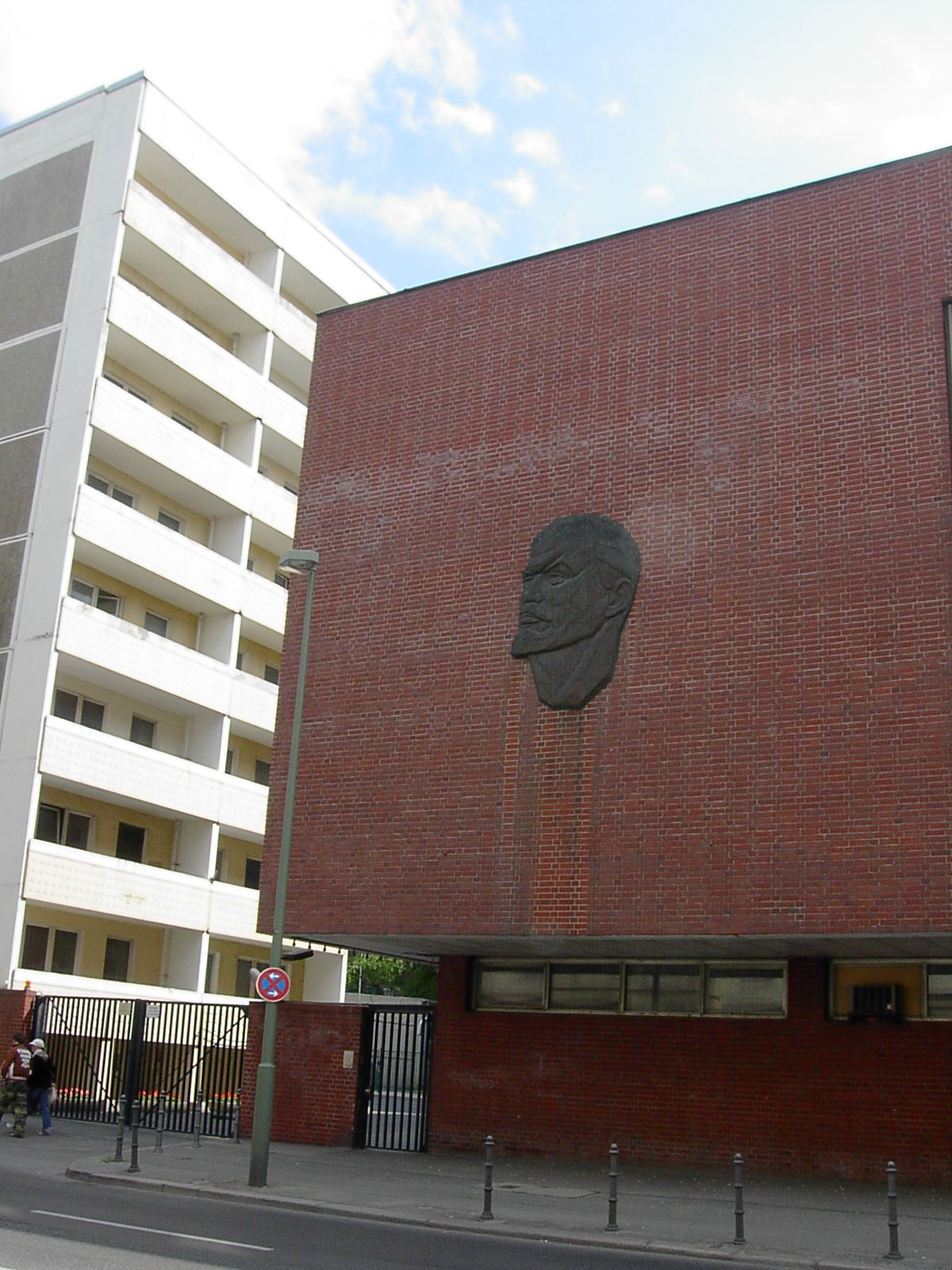
Wall plaque of Lenin, off Wilhelmstrasse

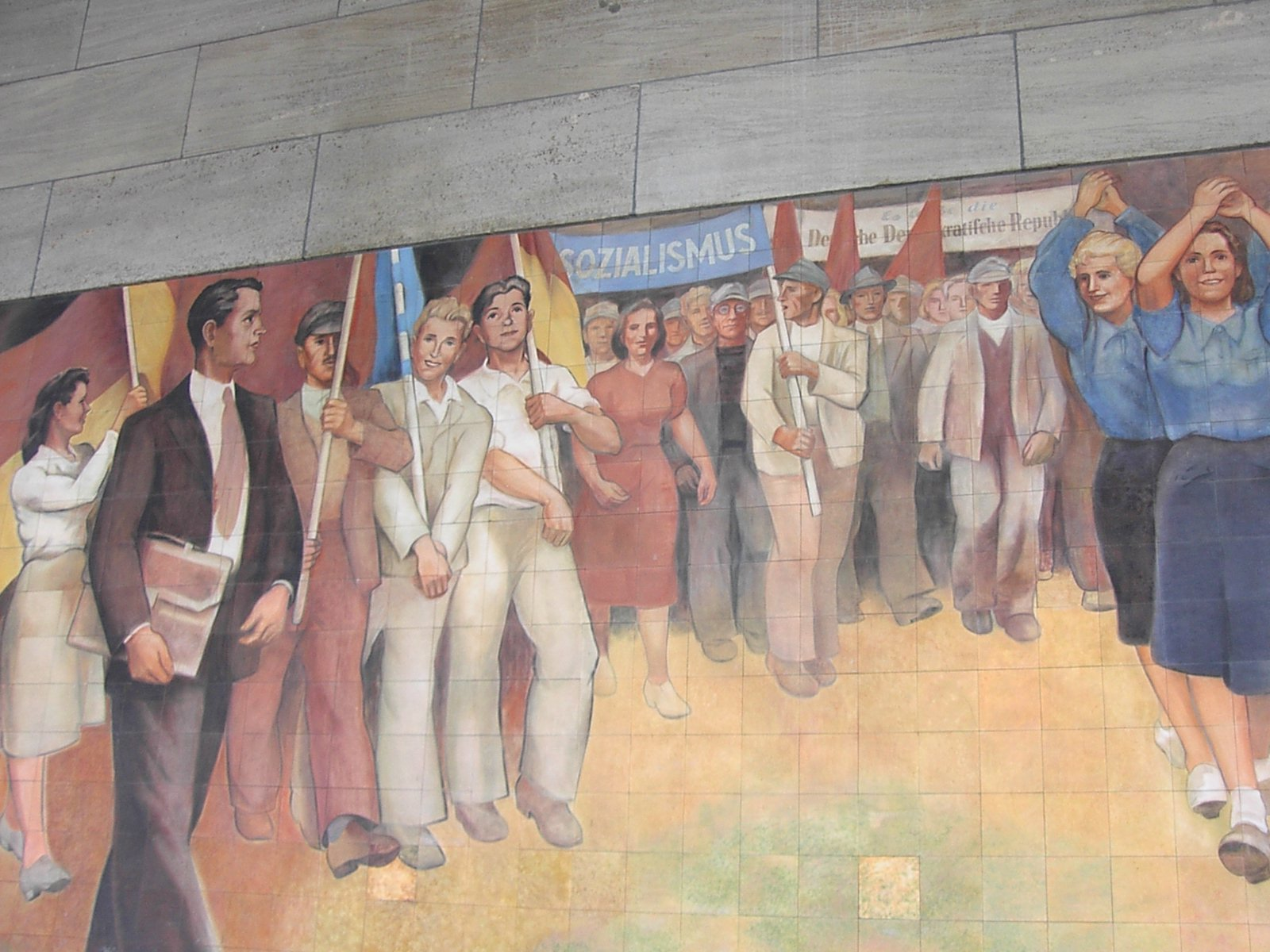
GDR-era mural of Meissen porcelain on former Council of Ministers building, facing Leipziger Straße

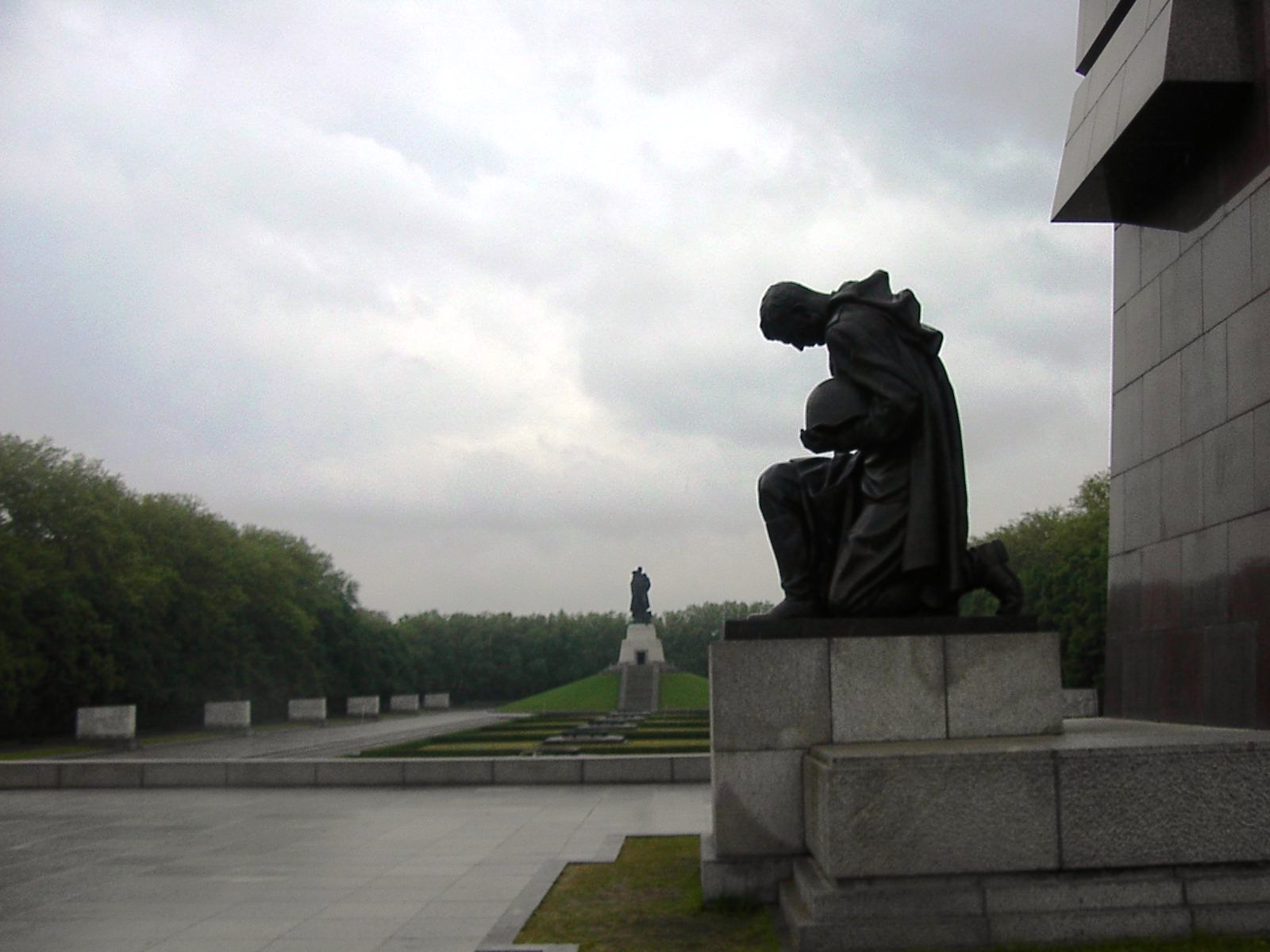
The Soviet War Memorial in Treptower Park

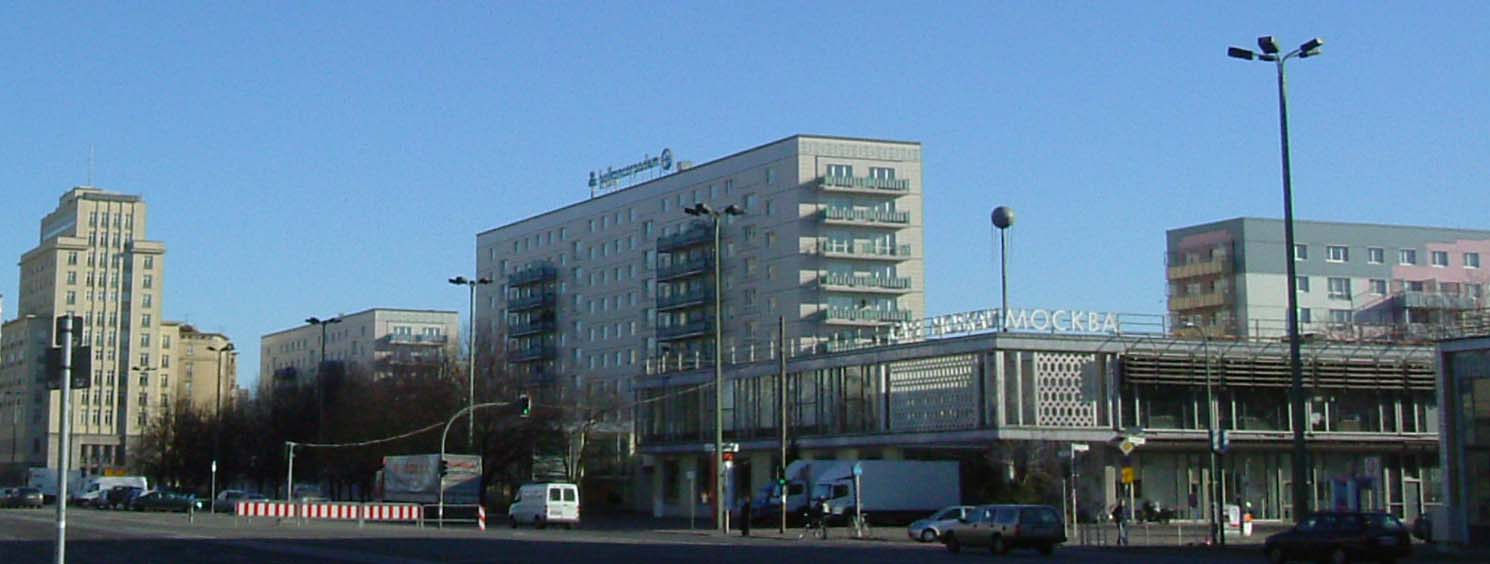
Cafe Moskau in Karl-Marx-Allee

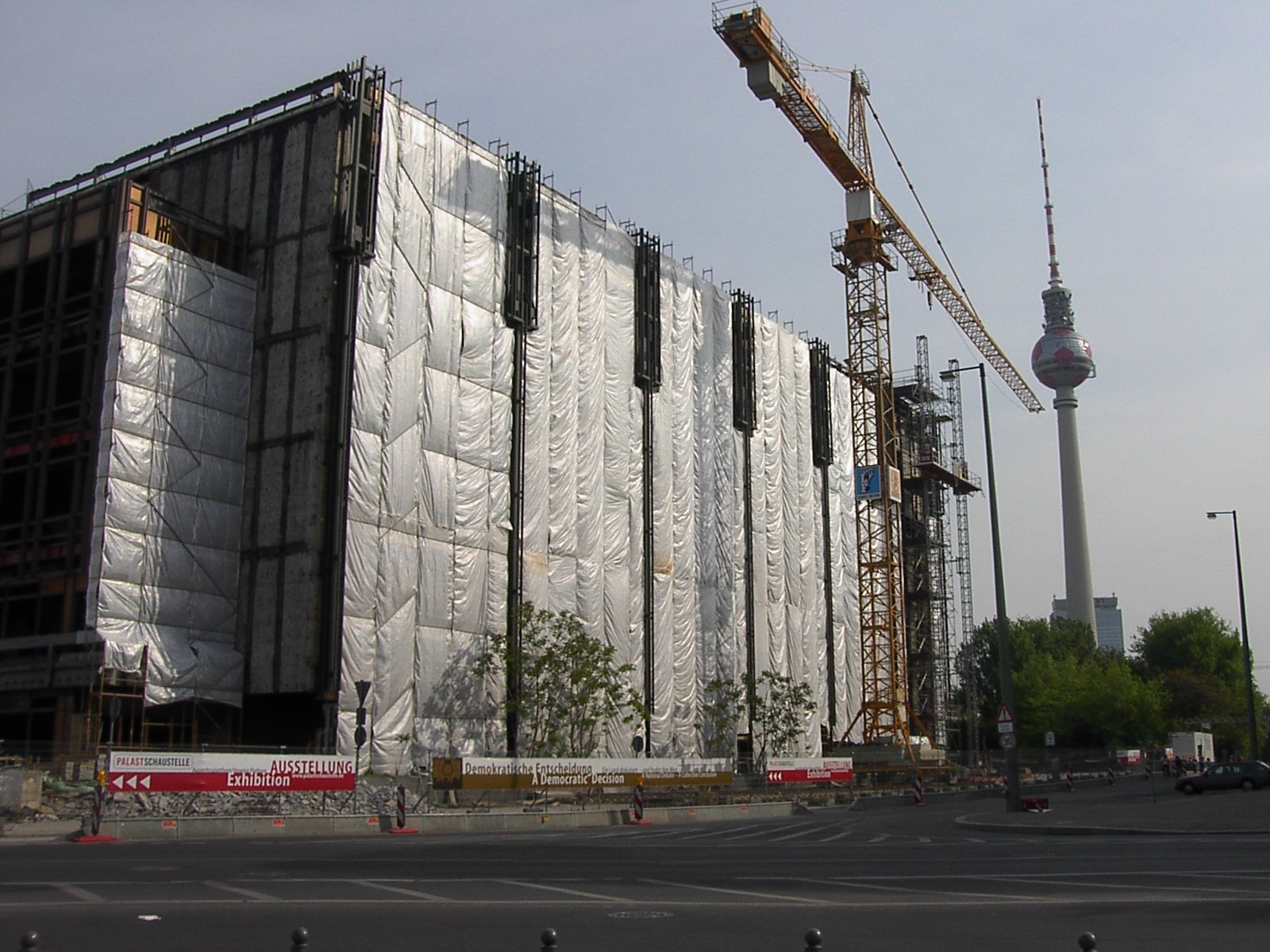
The Palace of the Republic, being dismantled

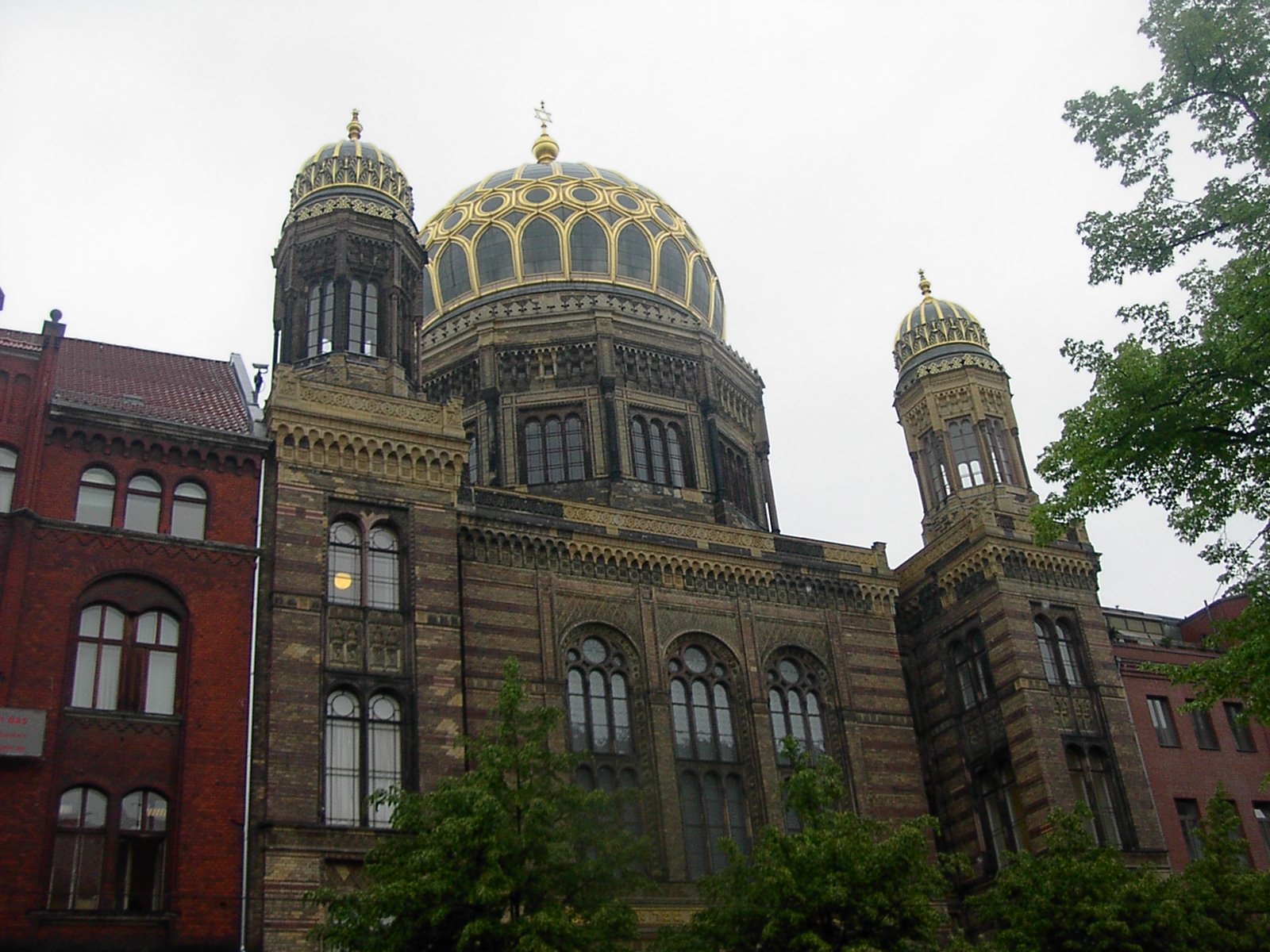
New Synagogue, Oranienburger Straße

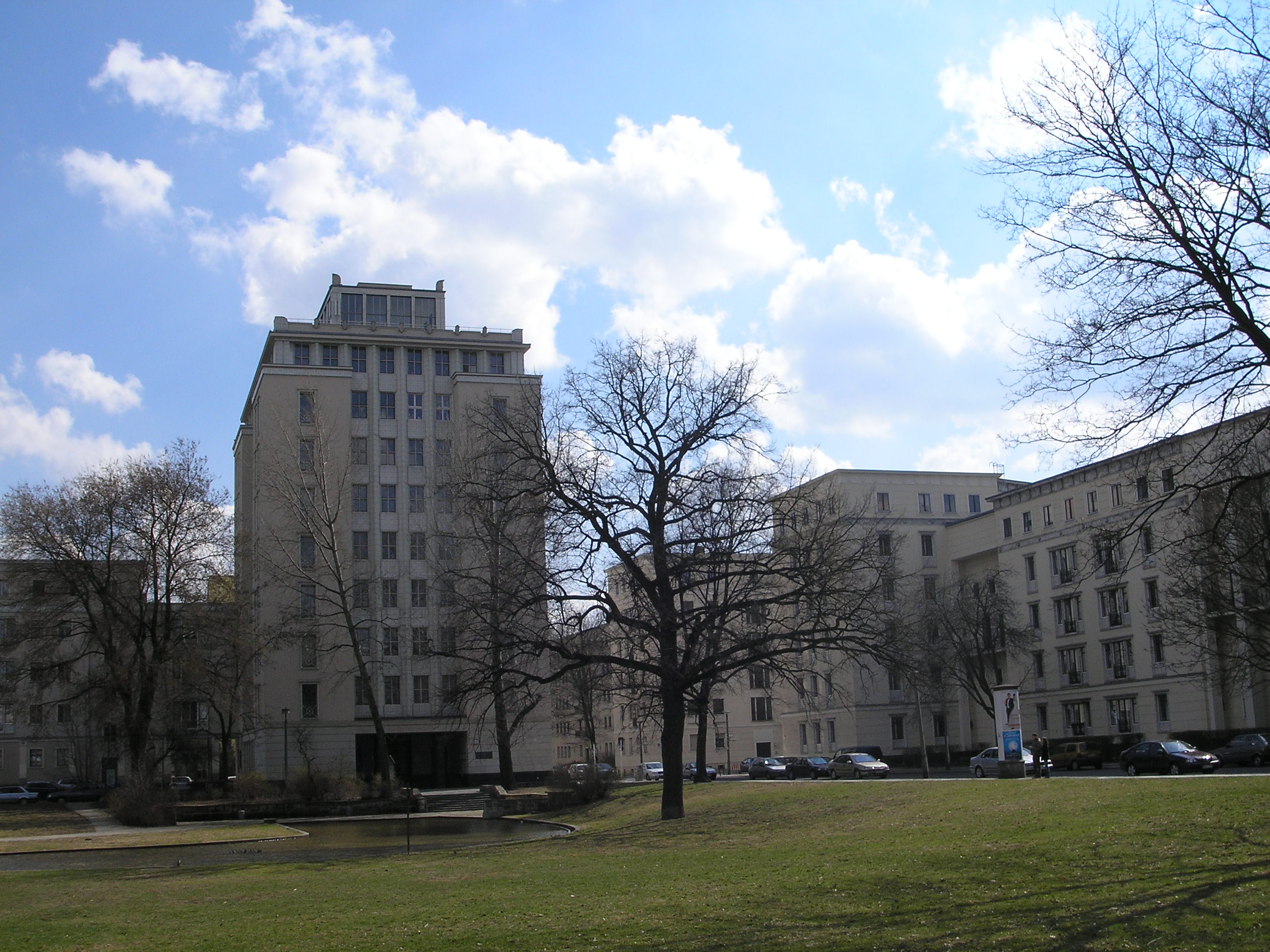
"Hochhaus" in Weberwiese, the first high-rise apartment built after the war

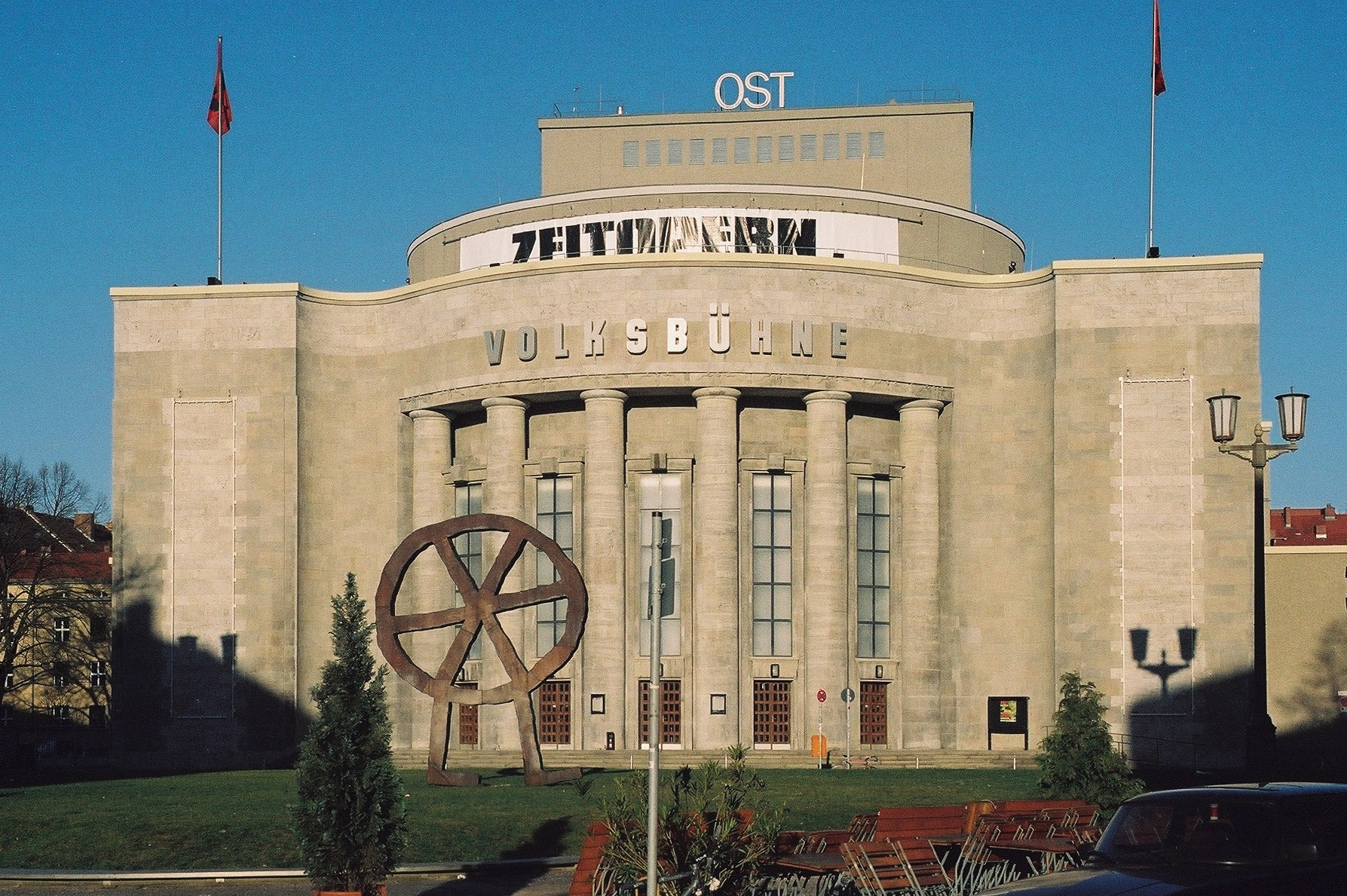
Volksbühne, Rosa-Luxemburg-Platz

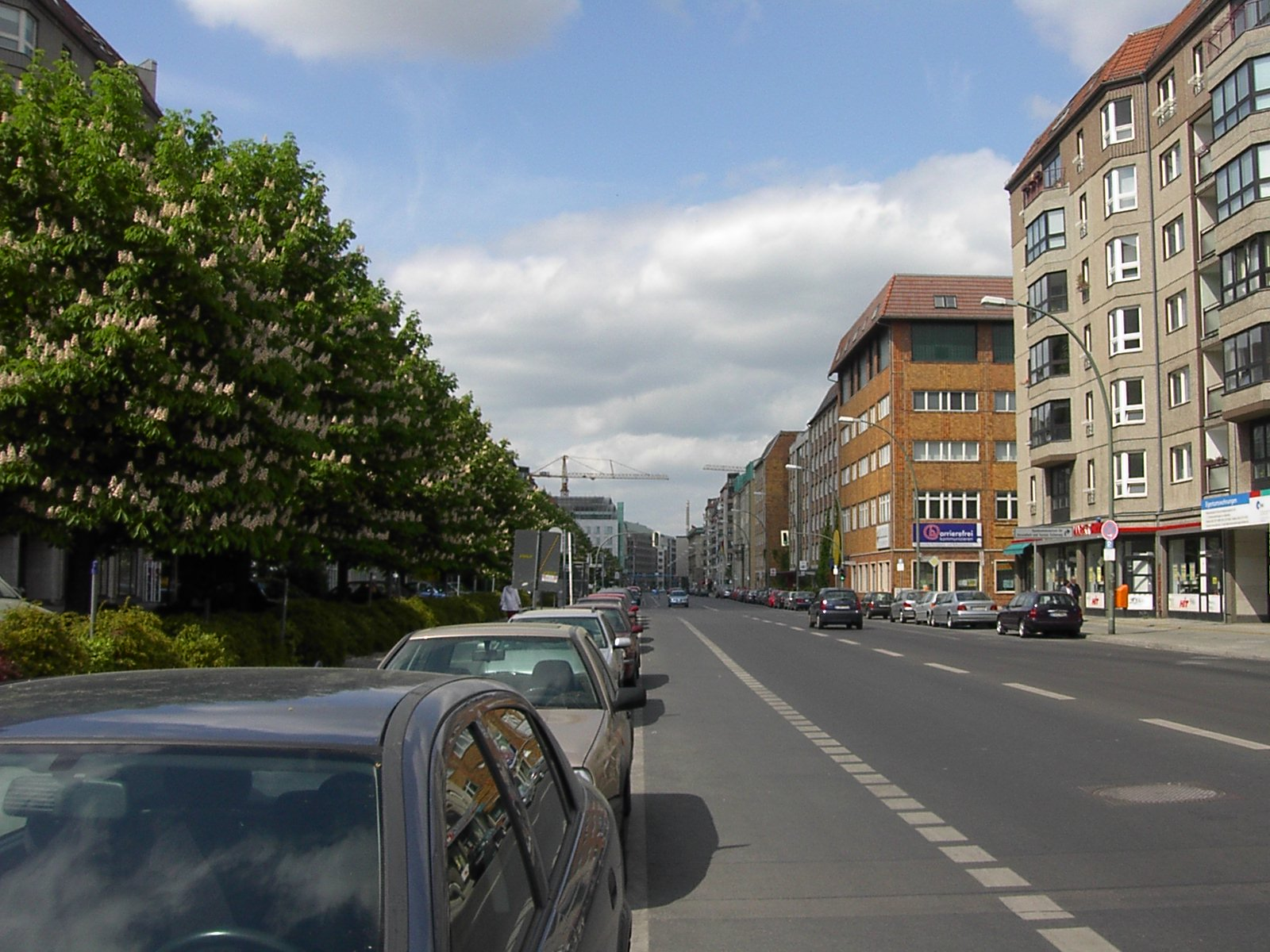
Late-1980s GDR apartment blocks on the Wilhelmstrasse

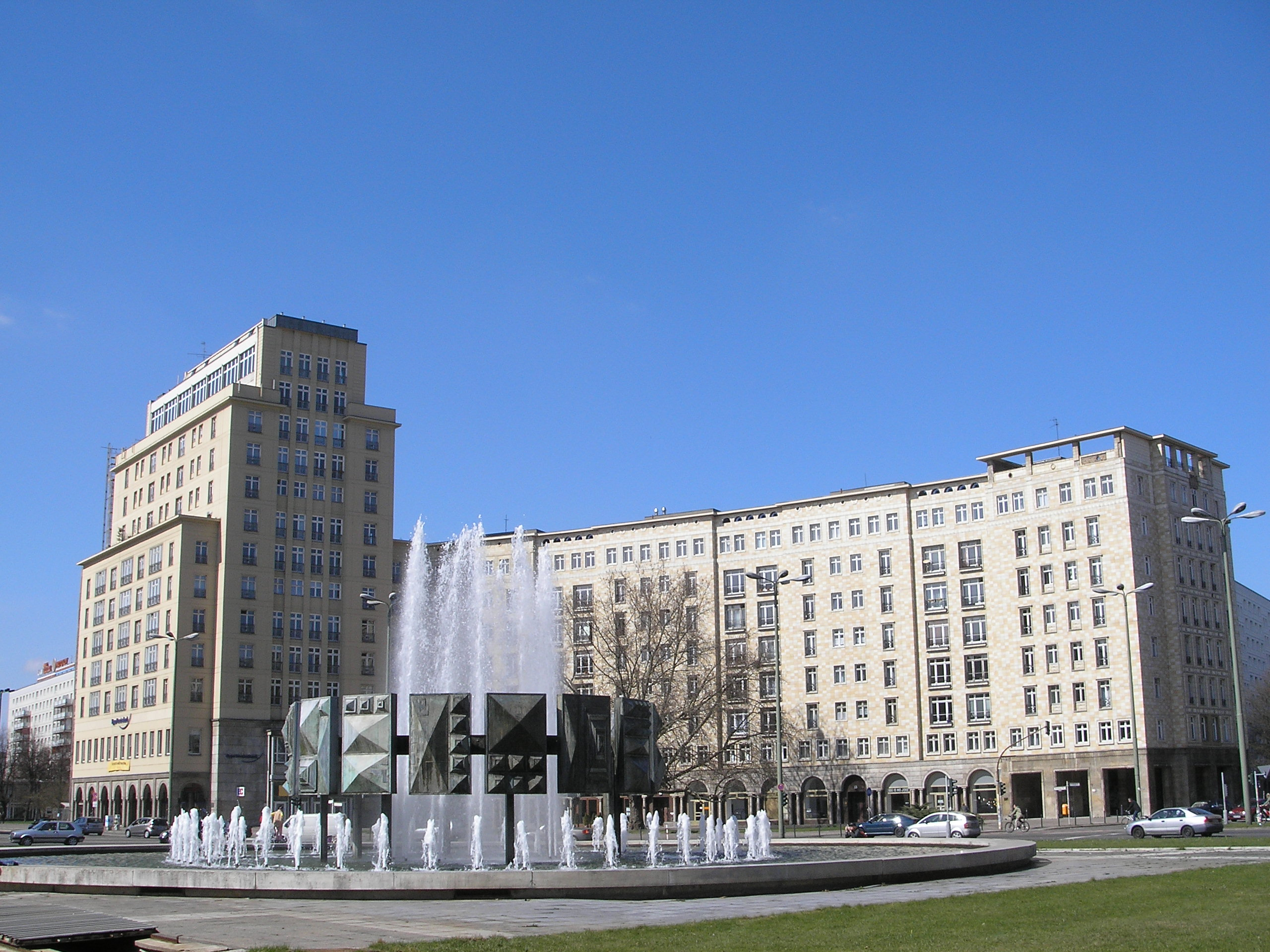
Strausberger Platz with constructivism style building

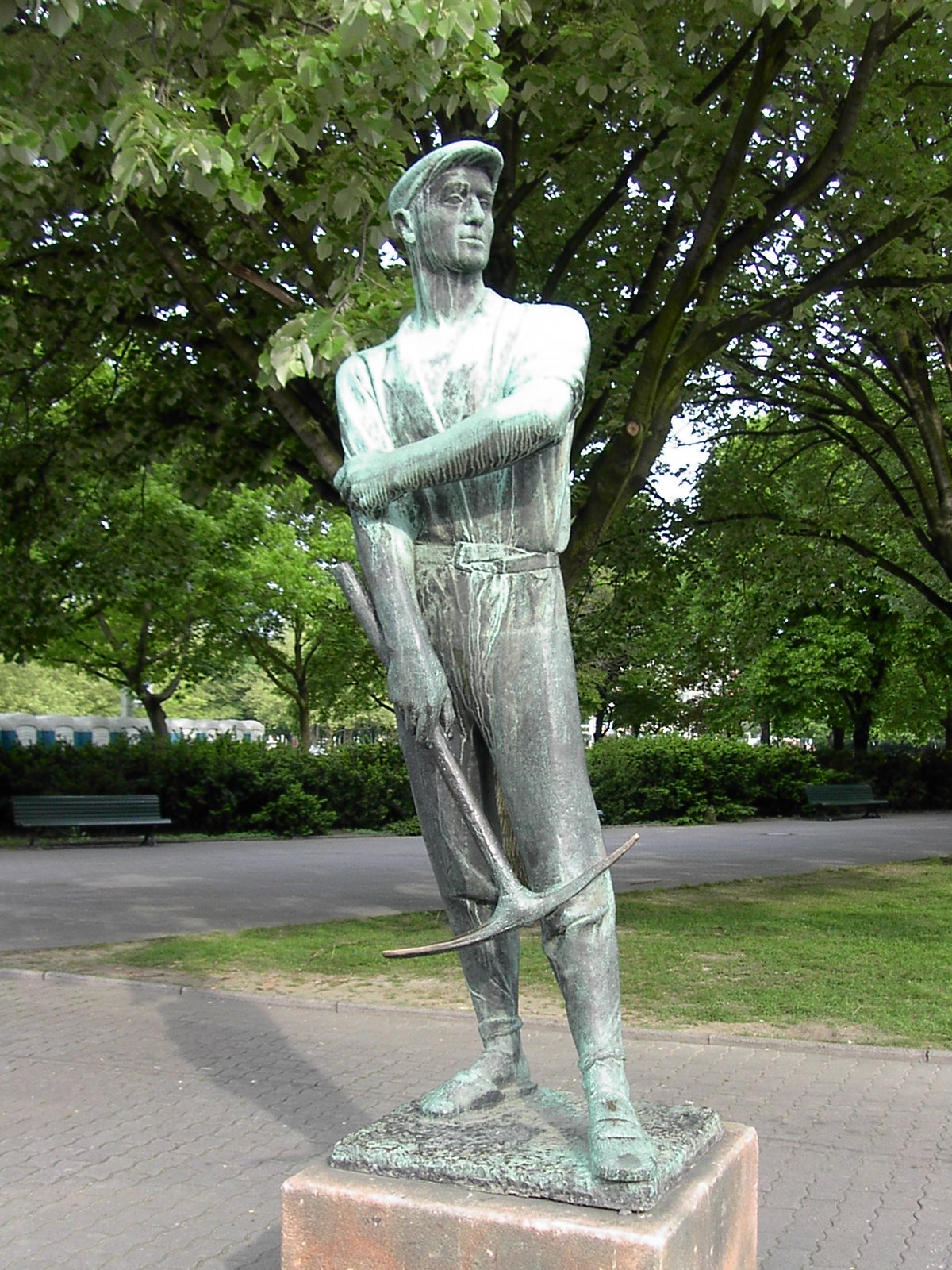
Proletarian hero, Alexanderplatz

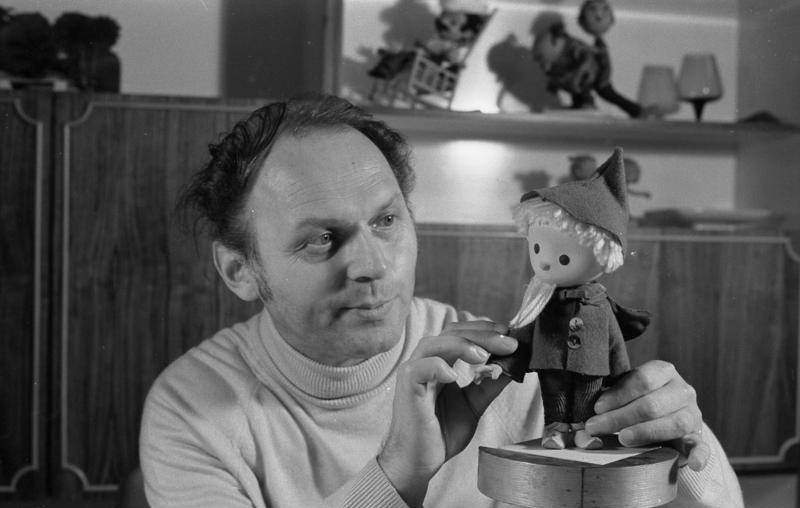
Gerhard Behrendt with Sandmännchen. The show was recorded in East Berlin

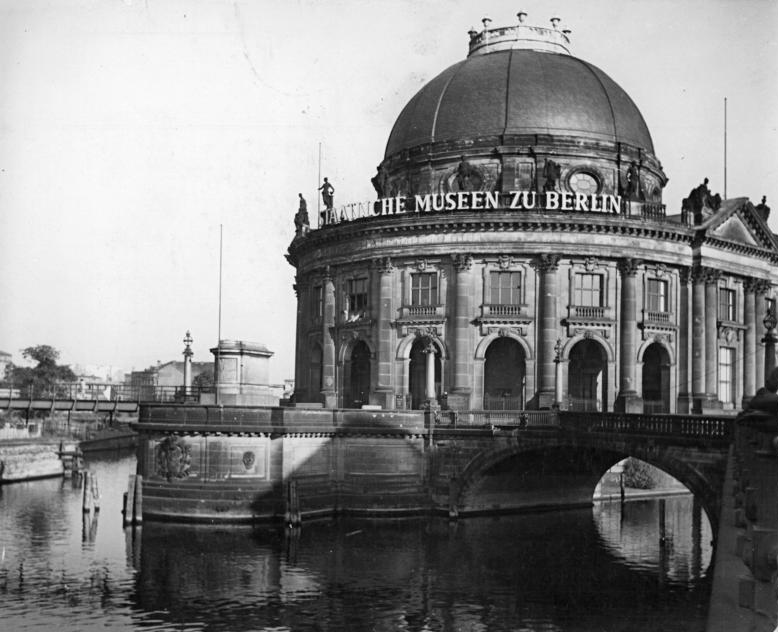
The Bode Museum at the northern end of the Museum Island, 1956

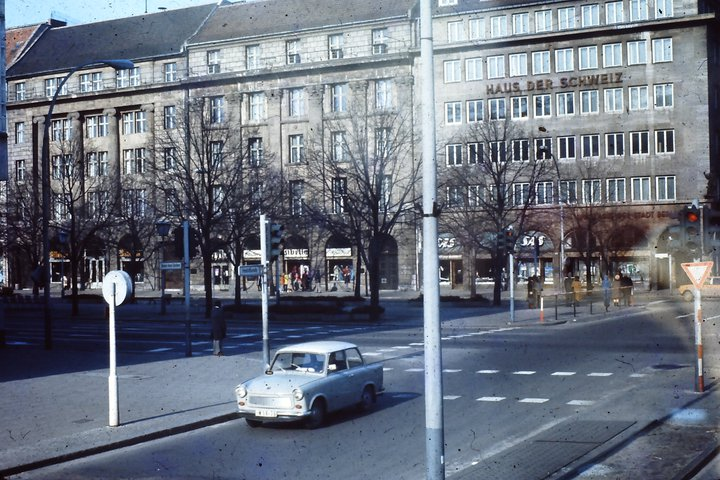
Haus der Schweiz, Unter der Linden at FriedrichStrasse, East Berlin, February 1975

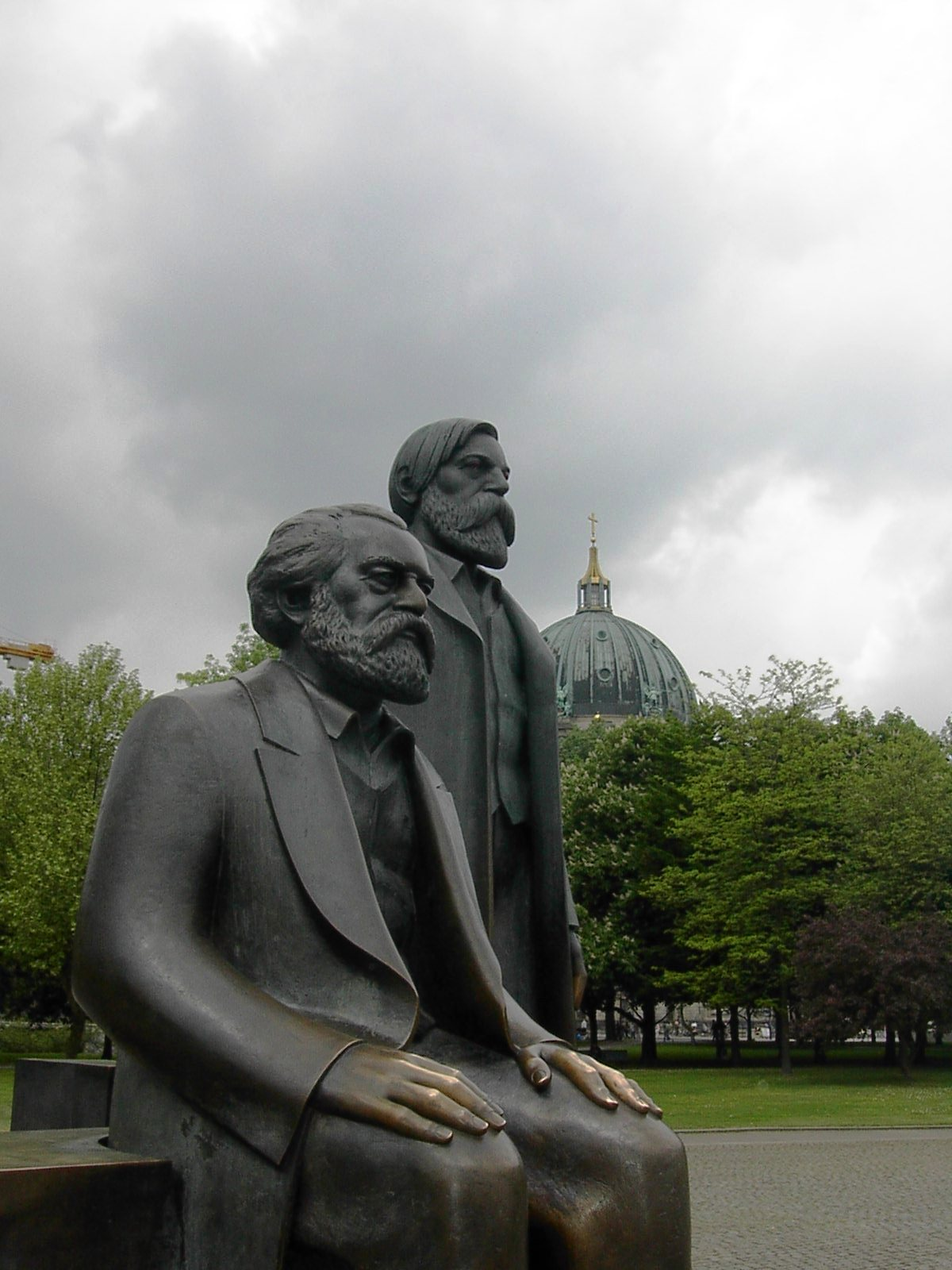
Statues of Marx and Engels, Marx-Engels-Forum

== See also ==
- West Berlin
- Bonn, the West German capital city
