= Alfred Neumann (East German politician) =

East German politician (1909–2001)

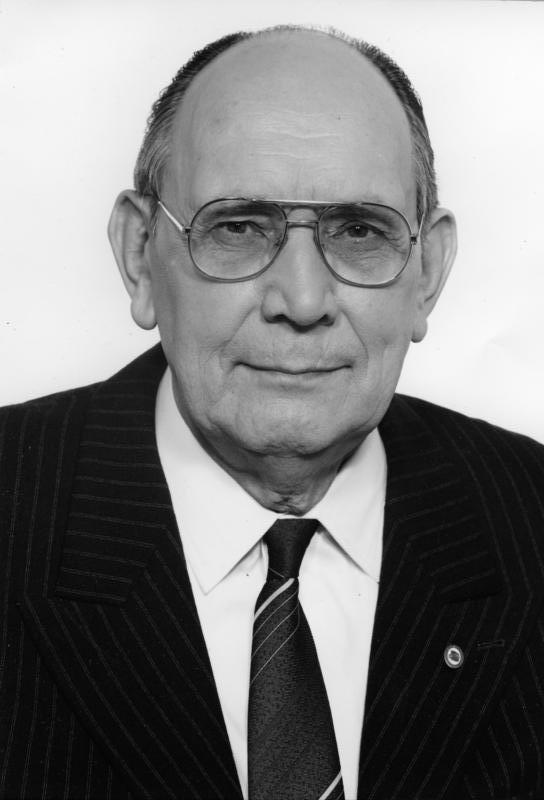
- Neumann in 1984

First Deputy Chairman of the Council of Ministers
- In office 26 June 1968 – 7 November 1989
- Chairman: Willi Stoph; Horst Sindermann; Willi Stoph
- Preceded by: Willi Stoph (1964)
- Succeeded by: Position abolished

Minister for Materials Management
- In office 22 December 1965 – 26 June 1968
- Chairman of the Council of Ministers: Willi Stoph
- Preceded by: Position established
- Succeeded by: Erich Haase

Chairman of the People's Economic Council
- In office 6 July 1961 – 22 December 1965
- Chairman of the Council of Ministers: Otto Grotewohl; Willi Stoph
- First Deputy: Günter Mittag; Erich Markowitsch; Johann Wittik
- Preceded by: Position established
- Succeeded by: Position abolished

Secretary for Cadre Affairs of the Central Committee
- In office 3 February 1958 – 4 July 1961
- First Secretary: Walter Ulbricht
- Preceded by: Karl Schirdewan
- Succeeded by: Erich Honecker

First Secretary of the Socialist Unity Party in Berlin
- In office 8 August 1953 – 16 February 1957
- Second Secretary: Hermann Axen; Willi Kuhn
- Preceded by: Hans Jendretzky
- Succeeded by: Hans Kiefert
Volkskammer
Member of the Volkskammer for Berlin-Treptow, Berlin-Köpenick (Magdeburg-Stadt; 1967-1981)
In office 8 November 1950 – 16 November 1989
| Preceded by | multi-member district |
| Succeeded by | Richard Schimko |

Personal details
- Born: 15 December 1909 Schöneberg, Berlin, Kingdom of Prussia, German Empire (now Germany)
- Died: 8 January 2001 (aged 91) Berlin, Germany
- Party: Socialist Unity Party (1946–1990)
- Other political affiliations: Communist Party of Germany (1929–1946)
- Occupation: Politician; Civil Servant; Party Clerk; Joiner
- Awards: Patriotic Order of Merit, 1st class; Order of Karl Marx
- Central institution membership: 1958–1989: Full member, Politburo of the Central Committee; 1954–1958: Candidate member, Politburo of the Central Committee; 1954–1989: Full member, Central Committee; Other offices held: 1965–1967: Deputy Chairman, Council of Ministers; 1960–1989: Member, National Defence Council; 1965–1967: Deputy Lord Mayor, East Berlin

Alfred "Ali" Neumann (15 December 1909 – 8 January 2001) was an East German politician. He was a member of the Politburo of the Central Committee of the Socialist Unity Party of Germany, and for a short time, he was East German Minister of Materials Management.

== Life ==
Neumann was born in Berlin-Schöneberg and completed training as a joiner. In 1919, he joined the worker's sport club "Fichte" ("Fir" or "Spruce"), which in 1928 became a member of the "Fighting Community for Red Sport Unity" ("Kampfgemeinschaft für Rote Sporteinheit"; KG). Neumann became a member of the Communist Party of Germany (KPD) in 1929, and in 1930, a member of the KG state leadership.

=== Second World War ===
In 1933-1934 he worked together with Karl Maron illegally – for Hitler had come to power by now – for the KG. In 1934, he emigrated through Sweden and Finland to the USSR, where he worked as a sport teacher. In 1938, he was expelled from the Soviet Union as he had no Soviet citizenship, and he went to Spain where he participated in the Spanish Civil War as a member of the International Brigades. In 1939, he was arrested in France and interned, in 1941, he was handed over to the Gestapo, and in 1942 he was sentenced by the Volksgerichtshof to eight years at hard labour in a Zuchthaus for high treason. In February 1945, he was transferred from Brandenburg-Görden Prison to the 2.SS-Sturmbrigade Dirlewanger, from which he succeeded in escaping. He became a Soviet prisoner of war, however, and stayed until 1947 in several prison camps.

=== East Germany ===
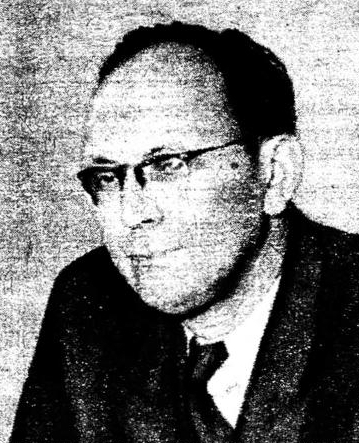
Neumann c. 1954

After his return to Germany, he joined the Socialist Unity Party ("Sozialistische Einheitspartei Deutschlands"; SED) and was an administrative staffer and an SED functionary at the district level in Berlin. In 1949, he became Secretary for Propaganda for the SED Berlin state leadership, from 1951 to 1953, he was East Berlin's acting mayor, and from 1953 to 1957, succeeding Hans Jendretzky, he was First Secretary of the Berlin SED district leadership.

From 1949, Neumann was a representative in the Volkskammer, from 1954 a member of the Central Committee and candidate, and from February 1958 a member of the SED Central Committee's Politburo. From 1957 to 1961, he was SED Central Committee Secretary, from 1961 to 1965 chairman of the People's Economic Council (Volkswirtschaftsrat), and from 1965 to 1968 Minister of Materials Management. From 1962, he was a member of the Presidium of the Council of Ministers, and in 1968 he was one of the first two acting chairmen of the Council of Ministers.

Neumann played an important role in the initiation and implementation of the New Economic System ("Neues Ökonomisches System"; NÖS). In the wake of Erich Honecker's removal of Walter Ulbricht in 1971, Neumann, as the only important Politburo member from that time, refused to go along with underwriting a secret request to the Soviet leadership for Ulbricht's redemption, since he was on Ulbricht's side on content and conceptual issues. Erich Honecker would never forget this. Neumann was until the end an uncomfortable antagonist to Honecker, but this was never used in public against him.

=== Downfall ===
In 1989, in East Germany's dying days, Neumann went back to join the Council of Ministers and was excluded from the Politburo. He was also excluded from the SED/PDS in 1990. From 1992 he faced accusations of "manslaughter and bodily harm on the inter-German border" for his membership in the East German National Defence Council ("Nationaler Verteidigungsrat der DDR"). The 23rd Penal Chamber of the Berlin State Court, however, stayed proceedings in 1999 without ever arranging a trial.

Neumann received in 1956 and 1964 the Fatherland Order of Merit and in 1984 the Order of Karl Marx.

== Literature ==
- "Arbeit für den Sozialismus", selected speeches, Berlin 1979
- "Die DDR stärken - den Frieden sichern", selected speeches, Berlin 1984
- S. Prokop: "Poltergeist im Politbüro. S. Prokop im Gespräch mit Alfred Neumann", Frankfurt an der Oder 1996
