= List of members of the fourth Volkskammer =

This list provides an overview of all members of the People's Chamber of the GDR in the 4th legislative period (1963–1967).

== Composition ==
In the 1963 East German general election, according to official information, 99.95% of the voters voted for the proposal of the National Front of the German Democratic Republic.

Faction	Seats of GDR deputies	Seats of Berlin representatives	Total seats	by party affiliation
SED	110	17	127	
DBD	45	7	52	
CDU	45	7	52	
LDPD	45	7	52	
NDPD	45	7	52	
FDGB	60	8	68	–
DFD	30	5	35	–
FDJ	35	5	40	–
Kulturbund	15	3	22	–
Independent				
Total	434	66	500	

The election did not influence the strength of the factions. Their size was predetermined. Through a new electoral law, the number of deputy mandates was increased to 500. The VdgB no longer formed a faction.

== Presidium ==
- President of the People's Chamber
  Johannes Dieckmann (LDPD)
- Deputy President of the People's Chamber
  Hermann Matern (SED)
- Members of the Presidium:
  August Bach (CDU) Deceased in 1966
  Hermann Kalb (CDU)
  Wilhelmine Schirmer-Pröscher (DFD)
  Otto Gotsche (SED)
  Ernst Goldenbaum (DBD)
  Grete Groh-Kummerlöw (FDGB)
  Jonny Löhr (NDPD)

== Faction Leaders ==
- Faction of the SED
  Hermann Matern
- Faction of the DBD
  Leonhard Helmschrott
- Faction of the CDU
  Wolfgang Heyl
- Faction of the LDPD
  Rudolf Agsten
- Faction of the NDPD
  Wolfgang Rösser
- Faction of the FDGB
  Rudolf Kirchner until 1965
  Hans Jendretzky
- Faction of the DFD
  Katharina Kern
- Faction of the FDJ
  Helmut Müller
- Faction of the Kulturbund
  Erich Wendt until 1965
  Karl-Heinz Schulmeister

== Members of the Volkskammer ==
Name	Faction	Remarks
Alexander Abusch	KB	
Richard Adam	CDU	
Rudolf Agsten	LDPD	faction leader
Eberhard Alff	SED	on January 13, 1965, for the Dept. Grotewohl moved up
Kurt Amberger	CDU	
Erich Apel	SED	deceased on December 3, 1965
Manfred von Ardenne	KB	
Hermann Arendholz	DBD	
Rainer Arlt	SED	
Margarete Arnhold	LDPD	
Hermann Axen	SED	
August Bach	CDU	died on March 23, 1966; Chairman of the parliamentary group
Walter Bading	LDPD	
Julius Balkow	SED	
Kurt Baresch	NDPD	
Edith Baumann	SED	Berlin representative
Herta Baumgärtel	CDU	
Charlotte Beck	FDJ	
Helene Behrens	SED	
Gerhard Benisch	FDGB	
Hilde Benjamin	SED	
Monika Berek	CDU	Berlin representative
Rolf Berger	FDGB	
Herbert Bergmann	DBD	
Helmut Bernhöft	FDGB	
Dietrich Besler	SED	Berlin representative
Regine Bialas	DFD	
Horst Bischeck	SED	
Gerhard Bläsing	SED	
Helga Bock	FDJ	married Helga Ewert
Lothar Bolz	NDPD	
Friderun Bondzin	KB	on December 20, 1965, for Rep. Wendt moved up
Waltraud Borowski	SED	Berlin representative
Alois Bräutigam	SED	
Ute Bräutigam	FDJ	
Horst Brasch	SED	
Willi Bredel	SED	died on October 27, 1964
Gerhard Broll	SED	on November 14, 1963, for Rep. Polak moved up
Peter Brucksch	FDJ	Berlin representative
Otto Buchwitz	SED	died on July 9, 1964
Hermann Budzislawski	FDGB	
Horst Büttner	FDGB	
Kurt Burkhardt	DBD	
Heinz Buss	LDPD	
Johannes Chemnitzer	SED	
Friedrich Clermont	SED	
Erich Correns	KB	
Franz Cott	DBD	
Franz Dahlem	SED	
Siegfried Dallmann	NDPD	
Kurt Debes	NDPD	
Else Dehnke	FDGB	
Gerd Delenschke	NDPD	Berlin representative
Johannes Dieckmann	LDPD	President of the People's Chamber
Herta Dippe	FDGB	
Regina Dittmar	DFD	
Ilse Dietze	CDU	
Horst Döll	NDPD	
Anneliese Dörrer	FDGB	
Marianne Dorn	NDPD	Berlin representative
Konrad Dorow	FDGB	Berlin representative
Lothar Dreher	CDU	Berlin representative
Paul Eberle	LDPD	Berlin representative
Erna Ebermann	SED	
Friedrich Ebert	SED	
Harry Eckardt	FDGB	Berlin representative
Kurt Ehrig	FDGB	Berlin representative
Ernst Eichhorn	SED	
Luise Ermisch	SED	
Georg Ewald	SED	
Manfred Ewald	SED	
Gerhard Fickel	CDU	
Otto Fiedler	DBD	Berlin representative
Ingeborg Fiege	LDPD	relieved of his mandate on January 21, 1966, at his own request
Wolfgang Fischer	FDJ	
Manfred Flegel	NDPD	
Rosemarie Flesch	CDU	
Peter Florin	SED	
Karl Frahm	NDPD	
Heinz Franke	SED	on September 1, 1964, for the Dept. Otto Buchwitz moved up
Erich Franz	NDPD	
Anna Frenzel	FDGB	
Margarete Fricke	DFD	
Walter Friedeberger	SED	Berlin representative died on May 14, 1967
Helma Friedrich	FDJ	Berlin representative
Paul Fröhlich	SED	
Gisela Fuchs	DFD	
Manfred Fürbass	LDPD	
Hildegard Fuhrmann	DFD	
Harald Funke	FDGB	
Otto Funke	SED	
Ernst Gallerach	SED	
Heinz Gattung	FDGB	
Liesbeth Gau	DBD	
Richard Gebel	NDPD	
Christine Gehlert	FDJ	
Paul Geisler	FDGB	
Willi Gerasch	FDGB	
Ernst Gering	FDGB	
Manfred Gerlach	LDPD	
Joachim-Ernst Gierspeck	LDPD	
Rudi Glück	LDPD	Berlin representative
Kurt Göhler	DBD	
Horst Göring	DBD	Berlin representative
Willi Görß	FDGB	
Gerald Götting	CDU	
Ernst Goldenbaum	DBD	Member of the Presidium of the People's Chamber
Otto Gotsche	SED	Member of the Presidium of the People's Chamber
Erich Grabowski	DBD	
Günther Grewe	CDU	
Karl Grittke	SED	Berlin representative
Grete Groh-Kummerlöw	FDGB	Member of the Presidium of the People's Chamber
Alfred Gromilovich	SED	Berlin representative
Roberta Gropper	FDGB	Berlin representative
Paul Grossherr	LDPD	
Manfred Grossman	FDGB	
Otto Grotewohl	SED	deceased on September 21, 1964
Gerhard Grüneberg	SED	
Erich Grützner	SED	
Kurt Grulich	DBD	
Wilhelm Gsell	FDGB	
Rudolf Gucinski	CDU	
Klaus Günther	FDGB	
Marie Gunder	DBD	
Wolfgang Guttke	FDGB	
Hildegard Haase	DBD	
Susanne Häber	DBD	
Heinz Hahne	CDU	
Martha Hagel	SED	Berlin representative
Kurt Hager	SED	
Ruth Hahn	DFD	
Alfred Haller	LDPD	
Wolfram Haller	CDU	
Roland Hammermüller	DBD	
Horst Hanfland	FDJ	
Emmy Handke	DFD	Berlin representative
Brunhilde Hanke	SED	
Ingelore Harnack	CDU	
Gertrud Hartmann	DBD	
Walter Hartung	NDPD	
Herbert Hasenbein	FDGB	
Johanna Hassinger	LDPD	
Kurt Haupt	CDU	
Walter Hauschild	FDGB	
Werner Heidinger	NDPD	
Hildegard Heine	SED	
Horst Heinrich	NDPD	
Siegfried Helbig	CDU	
Artur Helbing	FDGB	
Regina Helmdach	FDGB	
Leonhard Helmschrott	DBD	faction leader
Georg Hempel	LDPD	
Adolf Hennecke	SED	
Lieselott Herforth	FDGB	
Herbert Hertzsch	FDGB	
Fritz Herzberg	FDGB	
Hans-Joachim Heusinger	LDPD	
Wolfgang Heyl	CDU	faction leader
Ernst Himpel	SED	Resigned from office on December 20, 1965
Ursula Hintze	NDPD	
Irmgard Höhne	DFD	
Friedrich Höpfner	LDPD	
Elisabeth Höpner	FDGB	
Friedel Hoff	CDU	
Anni Hoffmann	SED	
Ernst Hoffmann	SED	Berlin representative
Heinz Hoffmann	SED	
Heinz-Rudolf Hoffmann	CDU	Berlin representative on September 13, 1965, for the deputy Rösner moved up
Eberhard Hofmann	KB	
Siegfried Hohmann	FDGB	
Christa Hojer	CDU	
Horst Holinski	FDGB	
Witho Holland	LDPD	Berlin representative
Ilse Holtzbecher	CDU	Berlin representative
Heinrich Homann	NDPD	
Erich Honecker	SED	
Fritz Hopf	LDPD	
Johanna Hoppe	DFD	
Heinz Hoßfeld	FDGB	
Claus-Jürgen Huch	NDPD	
Max Hübner	FDGB	
Helene Ilse	FDGB	
Martha Israel	DFD	
Dieter Itzerott	FDJ	
Ursula Jacobs	CDU	
Gisela Jänsch	SED	Berlin representative
Ingeborg Janke	SED	
Werner Jarowinsky	SED	
Hans Jendretzky	FDGB	from December 20, 1965, parliamentary group leader
Karl-Heinz Jentsch	LDPD	
Georg Jerga	CDU	
Hans-Rainer John	KB	Berlin representative
Hertha Jung	DFD	Berlin representative
Erich Kärger	DBD	
Susanne Kahlert	DFD	
Hermann Kalb	CDU	from 1966 member of the Presidium of the People's Chamber
Susi Kammerath	SED	Berlin representative
Martha Kanow	DFD	
Gerd Karol	FDGB	
Fritz Karsunke	DBD	
Werner Karwath	CDU	
Karl Kayser	KB	
Ruth Kellermann	NDPD	
Erich Kellner	LDPD	
Katharina Kern	DFD	faction leader
Heinz Keßler	SED	
Wulf-Peter Keuerleber	FDJ	
Hans Kiefert	SED	Berlin representative died on December 29, 1966
Gustav Kiesewetter	LDPD	
Bruno Kiesler	SED	
Kurt Kieß	SED	
Friedrich Kind	CDU	
Rudolf Kirchner	FDGB	faction leader
Ruth Kirsch	SED	
Hermann Kirschstein	FDGB	
Helmtraut Klara	DFD	Berlin representative
Gerhard Klein	KB	
Karl Heinz Klein	SED	
Gottfried Klepel	CDU	
Rosa Klimpel	DFD	
Wilfried Klöser	FDGB	
Claus-Dieter Knöfler	LDPD	
Hans Koch	KB	
Bernard Koenen	SED	deceased on April 30, 1964
Erwin Körber	DBD	Berlin representative
Rudolf Kohlermann	NDPD	
Lothar Kolbe	CDU	
Willi-Peter Konzok	LDPD	
Gerhard Kordus	LDPD	Berlin representative
Dieter Koßmehl	FDJ	
Edda Kramer	FDJ	
Erwin Kramer	SED	
Rudolf Kranke	FDGB	
Rudolf Kraus	SED	Resigned from office on March 16, 1966
Johanna Krause	DBD	
Rolf Kraushaar	DBD	Berlin representative
Otto Krauss	LDPD	
Kurt Krenz	SED	
Walter Kresse	SED	
Horst Kreter	NDPD	
Ingeborg Krohn	FDJ	
Werner Krolikowski	SED	
Ernst Krüger	FDGB	
Franz Kühlmann	CDU	
Jutta Kuenanz	LDPD	
Anita Kujoth	SED	Berlin representative
Traude Kunz	SED	on March 16, 1966, for Rep. Kraus moved up
Gerhard Kupke	SED	
Alfred Kurella	SED	
Inge Kutter	SED	
Alfred Kutzke	DBD	
Ursula Kutzner	CDU	
Adalbert Lang	SED	on January 21, 1966, for Rep. Himpel moved up
Gerhard Lange	CDU	
Ilse Lange	FDGB	
Ingeburg Lange	SED	
Ingrid Lange	DBD	Berlin representative
Heinz Lehmann	LDPD	
Robert Lehmann	FDJ	
Fritz Leimbach	LDPD	
Ernst-Heinz Lemper	CDU	
Arno von Lenski	NDPD	
Heinz Leubner	FDGB	
Harri Leupold	LDPD	Berlin representative
Bruno Leuschner	SED	died on February 10, 1965
Gerhard Lindner	LDPD	
Johannes Löhn	LDPD	
Jonny Löhr	NDPD	Member of the Presidium of the People's Chamber; Berlin representative
Günther Loose	SED	
Ilse Lorenz	DBD	
Siegfried Lorenz	FDJ	Berlin representative
Werner Lorenz	SED	
Gerhard Lucht	SED	
Christlieb Ludwig	CDU	
Heinz Lüder	NDPD	
Wolfgang Lungershausen	SED	
Edith Luthardt	FDGB	
Hans Luthardt	NDPD	
Paul Luzemann	FDGB	
Boto Märtin	DBD	
Christina Malcherek	SED	
Rolf Manneck	FDJ	
Hans Marchand	LDPD	
Karl Maron	SED	
Werner Martin	NDPD	Resignation of mandate on September 1, 1966
Werner Marx	DBD	Berlin representative
Hermann Matern	SED	Deputy President of the People's Chamber; Chairman of the parliamentary group
Heinz Matthes	SED	
Heinz Matzke	CDU	
Georg Mayer	SED	
Walter Mechler	LDPD	Resignation of mandate on October 13, 1966
Heinrich Meier	NDPD	
Horst Meischner	NDPD	
Renate Meißner	NDPD	
Werner Mennicke	SED	on September 13, 1965, for Rep. Leuschner moved up
Else Merke	DBD	
Martha Mettke	CDU	
Charlotte Mewes	DFD	
Gerhard Rudolf Meyer	NDPD	Berlin representative
Erich Mielke	SED	
Günter Mittag	SED	
Lore Mix	DFD	
Hans Modrow	SED	Berlin representative
Karl Mörl	CDU	
Walter Morawe	FDGB	
Helga Mucke-Wittbrodt	DFD	
Erich Mückenberger	SED	
Emmi Müller	FDGB	
Heinz Müller	SED	Berlin representative
Helmut Müller	FDJ	faction leader
Herbert Müller	DBD	
Joachim Müller	FDGB	
Margarete Müller	SED	
Walter Müller	SED	
Gerhard Münch	NDPD	
Elisabeth Naroschny	DFD	
Walter Nehls	FDJ	
Ingeborg Neike	FDGB	relieved of his mandate on November 3, 1965, at his own request
Willi Neubert	KB	
Heinz Neukrantz	FDGB	Berlin representative
Alfred Neumann	SED	
Anni Neumann	FDGB	
Klara Nieckchen	FDJ	
Siegfried Nobis	FDJ	
Albert Norden	SED	
Günter Nordt	SED	Resignation of mandate on February 20, 1967
Werner Noth	KB	
Monika Nowera	FDJ	Berlin representative
Rose Nyland-Distler	KB	
Dora Opitz	DFD	
Klaus Jürgen Osterland	FDJ	Berlin representative
Herbert Ott	LDPD	on January 21, 1966, for Dept. Fiege moved up
Martha Pässold	DBD	
Fritz Panteleit	DBD	
Christel Pappe	FDGB	on November 3, 1965, for the Dept. Neike moved up
Arnold Parnemann	LDPD	
Edmund Pech	LDPD	
Wolfgang Petermann	NDPD	
Ulrich Peters	NDPD	
Hans Günter Petzold	CDU	Berlin representative
Friedrich Pfaffenbach	NDPD	Berlin representative
Susanne Pfannenberg	CDU	
Ludwig Pfeiffer	NDPD	
Paul Pflock	LDPD	
Waltraud Piehl	DFD	
Heinz Pietzonka	DBD	
Alois Pisnik	SED	
Anton Plenikowski	SED	
Arthur Ploetz	SED	
Rolf Poche	FDJ	
Hans-Joachim Pohl	KB	
Karl Polak	NDPD	died on October 27, 1963
Rudolf Porschitz	NDPD	
Helmut Pregel	FDGB	
Ingrid Pressel	DBD	
Günter Prillwitz	FDGB	
Otto Püllmann	LDPD	on October 13, 1966, for Rep. Mechler moved up
Max Putze	SED	
Bernhard Quandt	SED	
Ernst-August Rabe	LDPD	
Erich Rätsch	SED	
Erwin Ramthun	SED	
Franz Rauwolf	CDU	
Eberhard Rebling	KB	Berlin representative
Herbert Recknagel	CDU	
Elisabeth Rehork	FDGB	
Regina Reich	FDJ	
Hans Reichelt	DBD	
Peter Reichelt	FDJ	
Anni Reim	SED	
Christine Reum	FDJ	
Eberhard Riedel	FDJ	
Walter Riedel	CDU	
Karl Rieke	SED	
Hans Rietz	DBD	
Heinz Ritter	LDPD	
Hans Rodenberg	SED	
Ilse Rodenberg	NDPD	Berlin representative
Hansjürgen Rösner	CDU	Berlin representative died on October 25, 1964
Wolfgang Rösser	NDPD	faction leader
Paul Roscher	SED	
Marianne Roß	DBD	
Ewald Roßbach	DBD	
Christian-Wilhelm Rowoldt	NDPD	
Otto Rühle	NDPD	
Willy Rumpf	SED	
Gertrud Sasse	LDPD	
Paul Saul	SED	
Jenny Schack	CDU	
Friedrich Schäfer	FDGB	
Willy Schäfer	DBD	
Johann Scheibler	DBD	
Werner Scheler	KB	
Waldemar Schilling	FDGB	
Ingrid Schippmann	SED	
Gregor Schirmer	KB	
Wilhelmine Schirmer-Pröscher	DFD	Member of the Presidium of the People's Chamber
Walter Schlee	NDPD	
Otto Schlegelmilch	FDGB	
Friedrich Schlette	NDPD	
Frank Schliephake	SED	
Paula Schlitter	DFD	
Ursula Schlosser	DFD	
Herbert Schmidt	CDU	
Martha Schmidt	DFD	Berlin representative
Waldemar Schmidt	SED	Berlin representative
Berthold Schmitt	SED	
Renate Schneider	FDJ	
Volker Schnell	FDJ	
Otto Schön	SED	
Georg Scholz	LDPD	
Paul Scholz	DBD	
Ehrhard Schrader	DBD	
Elisabeth Schröder	NDPD	
Hans Schuldt	CDU	
Karl-Heinz Schulmeister	KB	from December 20, 1965, parliamentary group leader
Margarete Schulz	SED	Berlin representative
Christa Schulze	FDJ	
Rudolph Schulze	CDU	
Horst Schumann	FDJ	
Gustav-Adolf Schur	FDJ	
Ida Schwedat	LDPD	
Erika Schweder	NDPD	
Max Sefrin	CDU	
Kurt Seibt	SED	
Hans Seigewasser	SED	
Charlotte Sembdner	NDPD	
Max Seydewitz	SED	
Rolf Sieber	FDGB	Berlin representative
Gustav Siemon	NDPD	Berlin representative
Paul Simon	SED	
Horst Sindermann	SED	
Heinz Sommer	FDGB	
Klaus Sorgenicht	SED	
Hermann Spencker	LDPD	
Dietmar Staender	FDJ	
Gerd Staegemann	NDPD	on September 1, 1966, for the Dept. Martin moved up
Max Staffeldt	CDU	
Luitpold Steidle	CDU	
Charlotte Steinbach	DFD	
Ursula Steinert	CDU	on September 1, 1966, for the Dept. Bach moved up
Anni Steinhardt	FDJ	
Christian Steinmüller	NDPD	
Hans-Rolf Stellwagen	CDU	Berlin representative
Reinhard Sterzik	FDGB	
Gerhard Stieberitz	FDJ	
Albert Stephen	SED	
Inge Stoltze	FDJ	
Willi Stoph	SED	
Margitta Stopp	SED	on January 21, 1966, for Rep. Apel moved up
Paul Strauß	SED	
Tatjana Strobel	NDPD	
Dieter Strubberg	KB	
Hans Stubbe	KB	
Max Suhrbier	LDPD	
Ingeborg Tauschke	DFD	
Hannelore Templiner	FDGB	Berlin representative
Rudolf Teschauer	SED	
Bruno Thalmann	LDPD	Berlin representative
Brigitte Theil	DFD	
Ilse Thiele	DFD	
Kurt Thieme	SED	Berlin representative
Fritz Thiemes	DBD	Berlin representative
Liselotte Thoms-Heinrich	DFD	Berlin representative
Annelie Thorndike	KB	
Walter Thürmer	LDPD	
Harry Tisch	SED	
Heinrich Toeplitz	CDU	
Herbert Trebs	CDU	Berlin representative
Harry Trumpold	LDPD	
Fritz Tschetschorke	DBD	
Kurt Turba	FDJ	
Walter Ulbricht	SED	
Eckhard Ullrich	FDJ	
Hans Ulrich	NDPD	
Helmut Ustrowski	FDGB	Berlin representative
Paul Verner	SED	
Gerda Vieth	DFD	
Herta Voigt	DBD	
Inge Voigt	DFD	
Dieter Wächtler	FDJ	
Gerhard Wagner	LDPD	
Martin Wagner	DBD	
Herbert Warnke	SED	
Ingeborg Warzecha	NDPD	
Irma Wattenbach	DFD	
Hans Watzek	DBD	
Johannes Weidauer	NDPD	
Marta Weigt	DFD	
Ingeborg Weituschat	DFD	Berlin representative
Herbert Weiz	SED	
Karla Wencke	KB	Berlin representative
Erich Wendt	KB	deceased on May 8, 1965
Josef Wenig	FDGB	
Harald Werthmann	LDPD	Berlin representative
Monika Werner	SED	
Otto Werner	DBD	
Rudi Werner	DBD	
Wilhelm Werner	DBD	
Hans Wiesner	SED	
Richard O. Wilhelm	LDPD	
Otto Winzer	SED	
Karl-Heinz Wittig	NDPD	
Margarete Wittkowski	SED	
Elfriede Wohlleben	LDPD	
Günter Wolf	FDGB	
Manfred Wolf	FDGB	
Horst Wolter	SED	
Werner Wolter	DBD	
Kurt Wünsche	LDPD	
Stephan Zagrodnik	DBD	
Gertrud Zepernik	DBD	
Herbert Ziegenhahn	SED	
Dieter Ziegler	SED	on September 1, 1964, for the Dept. Bernard Koenen moved up
Erwin Ziesmann	DBD	
Ursula Zschommler	SED	on January 13, 1965, for the Dept. Bredel moved up
Johann Zuber	FDGB	
Arnold Zweig	KB	

== Literature ==
- Secretariat of the People's Chamber on behalf of the President of the People's Chamber of the GDR (Ed.) Die Volkskammer der Deutschen Demokratischen Republik: 4. Wahlperiode. Staatsverlag der DDR, Berlin 1964.
- Günther Buch: Namen und Daten wichtiger Personen der DDR. 3rd revised and expanded edition. Dietz, Berlin (West) / Bonn 1982, ISBN 3-8012-0081-7.
