= List of members of the third Volkskammer =

This list provides an overview of all members of the Volkskammer of the German Democratic Republic (East Germany) during the 3rd legislative period (1958–1963).

== Composition ==
In the Volkskammer election of 1958, according to official figures, 99.87% of the voters supported the proposal put forth by the National Front.

Faction	Seats of East German Deputies	Seats of Deputies from Greater Berlin	Total Seats	According to Party Affiliation
SED	100	17	117	
DBD	45	7	52	
CDU	45	7	52	
LDPD	45	7	52	
NDPD	45	7	52	
FDGB	45	8	53	-
DFD	25	4	29	-
FDJ	25	4	29	-
Kulturbund	15	3	18	-
VdgB	10	2	12	-
Independent				
Total	400	66	466	

The election did not influence the strength of the factions. Their size was predetermined. The right column of the above table reflects the party affiliations of the members of the FDGB, DFD, FDJ, VdgB, and Kulturbund factions.

== Presidium ==
- President of the Volkskammer
  Johannes Dieckmann (LDPD)
- 1st Deputy President of the Volkskammer
  Hermann Matern (SED)
- Deputy Presidents
  Friedrich Ebert (SED)
  August Bach (CDU)
  Ernst Goldenbaum (DBD)
  Wilhelmine Schirmer-Pröscher (DFD)
  Grete Groh-Kummerlöw (FDGB)

== Faction Leaders ==
- SED Faction
  Hermann Matern
- DBD Faction
  Berthold Rose
- CDU Faction
  Gerald Götting
- LDPD Faction
  Rudolf Agsten
- NDPD Faction
  Wolfgang Rösser
- FDGB Faction
  Rudolf Kirchner
  Grete Groh-Kummerlöw elected on December 2, 1959
- DFD Faction
  Katharina Kern
- FDJ Faction
  Helmut Müller
- Kulturbund Faction
  Erich Wendt
- VdgB/Cooperatives Faction
  Friedrich Wehmer

== Deputies ==
Name	Faction	Notes
Kurt Abendroth	DBD	no longer a Member of Parliament from October 4, 1960
Moritz Abt	CDU	
Alexander Abusch	KB	
Richard Adam	CDU	
Wilhelm Adam	NDPD	
Rudolf Agsten	LDPD	
Lieschen Ahrendt	DBD	
Otto Albrecht	VdgB	on April 25, 1960, for Rep. Benecke moved up
Kurt Anclam	LDPD	
Georg André	NDPD	no longer a Member of Parliament from April 17, 1963
Herbert Angermann	LDPD	no longer a Member of Parliament from April 25, 1960
Luise Angermann	DBD	
Erich Apel	SED	
Heinz Arnold	VdgB	
Hermann Axen	SED	Berlin representative
August Bach	CDU	
Walter Badke	FDJ	
Friedrich Ball	FDGB	
Erwin Bär	DBD	
Fritz Barth	SED	
Karl-Heinrich Barthel	NDPD	
Bruno Baum	SED	Berlin representative
Edith Baumann	SED	
Helga Baumgärtel	FDJ	
Erich Baumgarten	NDPD	
Gertrude Below	DBD	
Otto Benecke	VdgB	deceased on March 4, 1960
Hilde Benjamin	SED	
Gerhard Bensch	LDPD	on January 24, 1962, for Rep. Pridöhl moved up
Charlotte Bergmann	LDPD	
Hans Bertram	LDPD	Berlin representative
Dietrich Besler	VdgB	Berlin representative
Wilhelm Beyer	DBD	on October 4, 1960, for the Ab. victory moved up
Jost Biedermann	CDU	Berlin representative
Walter Biering	SED	
Otto Binger	NDPD	Berlin representative
Horst Bischek	SED	
Gerhard Bläsing	SED	
Karl Blue	NDPD	
Rudolf Blue	SED	
Ursula Blue	FDGB	
Waldemar Bogenschneider	FDJ	
Georg Böhm	DBD	
Otto Böhnhardt	FDGB	
Lothar Bolz	NDPD	
Herbert Born	DBD	
Alois Bräutigam	SED	
Walter Breitfeld	SED	
Arno Brömme	SED	
Magdalene Bruckmann	VdgB	
Hans Brückner	LDPD	
Theodor Brugsch	KB	Berlin representative died on July 11, 1963
Walter Buchheim	SED	
Otto Buchwitz	SED	Senior President
Hermann Budzislawski	FDGB	
Heinz Buss	LDPD	
Erich Correns	KB	
Franz Cott	DBD	
Bruno Curth	DBD	
Georg Dalibor	FDJ	
Elfriede Dallmann	NDPD	Berlin representative
Siegfried Dallmann	NDPD	
Kurt Debes	NDPD	
Gerd Delenschke	NDPD	Berlin representative
Johannes Dieckmann	LDPD	President of the People's Chamber
Karl-Heinz Diedrich	FDGB	
Ilse Dietze	CDU	
Ursula Dirumdam	FDJ	
Marta Dittmar	SED	
Irma Dockhorn	FDJ	
Rudolf Dölling	SED	
Walter Dörner	DBD	
Otto Dohne	SED	Berlin representative no longer a Member of Parliament from April 17, 1963
Konrad Dorow	FDGB	Berlin representative
Maria Drechsler	FDJ	
Gerhard Dziallas	FDGB	
Klaus-Jürgen Ebelt	LDPD	
Friedrich Ebert	SED	Deputy President of the People's Chamber
Hugo Eckardt	KB	on July 6, 1961, for the Ab. Meusel moved up
Charlotte Eichler	FDGB	Berlin representative
Rudolf Eichhorn	CDU	
Franz Eiselt	CDU	
Elfriede Eisold	FDGB	
Ilse Endter	FDJ	
Christine Enke	LDPD	
Gerhilde Engelhardt	LDPD	Berlin representative died on June 7, 1959
Luise Ermisch	SED	
Arno Ettrich	SED	
Theodor Eversmann	CDU	
Martha Faust	FDGB	deceased on June 10, 1962
Wilhelm Feldmann	NDPD	
Gerhard Fickel	CDU	
Gerhard Fischer	LDPD	Berlin representative
Manfred Flegel	NDPD	
Rosemarie Flesch	CDU	
Fritz Flint	CDU	Berlin representative
Peter Florin	SED	
Hans Heinrich Franck	KB	deceased on December 21, 1962
Dieter Franke	DBD	on October 4, 1960, for the Ab. Abendroth moved up
Willi Franke	NDPD	on April 17, 1963, for Rep. Rosenthal moved up
Erich Franz	KB	died on February 10, 1961
Reinhold Franz	DBD	
Anna Frenzel	SED	
Helmut Friedrich	CDU	Berlin representative
Ursula Friedrich	CDU	
Ruth Fritzsche	FDJ	
Paul Fröhlich	SED	
Gisela Fuchs	DFD	
Wilhelm Funder	NDPD	
Otto Funke	SED	
Richard Gebel	NDPD	
Paul Geisler	FDGB	
Manfred Gerlach	LDPD	
Alfred Geßner	LDPD	on October 19, 1962, for the Ab. Nicely moved up
Erich Giebner	SED	died on February 8, 1960
Ernst-Joachim Gießmann	KB	
Else Girke	SED	
Gerald Götting	CDU	
Margarete Götzelt	FDGB	
Eduard Götzl	SED	
Arnold Gohr	CDU	Berlin representative
Ernst Goldenbaum	DBD	
Harry Goldschmidt	LDPD	
Hans Gorzynski	CDU	
Günther Graul	FDGB	
Kurt Gregor	SED	
Fritz Greuner	LDPD	
Hermann Grimm	LDPD	
Karl Grittke	SED	Berlin representative
Grete Groh-Kummerlöw	FDGB	Deputy President of the People's Chamber
Roberta Gropper	FDGB	Berlin representative
Otto Grotewohl	SED	
Gerhard Grüneberg	SED	
Erich Grützner	FDGB	
Kurt Grulich	DBD	
Herbert greeting	FDGB	
Hildegard Günther	DBD	
Hans Güth	CDU	Berlin representative on March 28, 1962, for the deputy Mascher moved up
Nelly Haalck	CDU	
Heinz Haase	DBD	Berlin representative
Sonja Haberkorn	DFD	on April 17, 1963, for Dept. Thälmann moved up
Kurt Hager	SED	
Martha Hagel	SED	Berlin representative
Kurt Hahn	LDPD	
Emmy Handke	DFD	Berlin representative
Georg Handke	SED	deceased on September 7, 1962
Ludwig Harms	CDU	
Robert Havemann	KB	
Werner Heidinger	NDPD	
Emma Heinrich	CDU	
Horst Heinrich	NDPD	
Artur Helbing	FDGB	
Katharina Helbing	DFD	Berlin representative
Walter Hellbach	SED	
Leonhard Helmschrott	DBD	
Otto Hemmann	FDGB	on October 4, 1960, for the Ab. Orlop moved up
Georg Hempel	LDPD	
Adolf Hennecke	SED	
Gertrud Henseler	VdgB	
Elsa Hentschke	SED	
Hans Herkner	DBD	
Friedrich Herte	CDU	
Hans-Joachim Heusinger	LDPD	on March 24, 1961, for Rep. hole moved up
Wolfgang Heyl	CDU	
Ursula Hintze	NDPD	
Frida Hockauf	FDGB	
Friedel Hoff	CDU	
Ernst Hoffmann	SED	Berlin representative
Heinz Hoffmann	SED	
Herbert Hoffmann	DBD	
Werner Hohlfeld	FDGB	
Gertrud Holl	DFD	
Heinrich Homann	NDPD	Deputy President of the People's Chamber
Erich Honecker	FDJ	
Ernst Höppner	FDGB	
Ursula Hörenz	FDGB	
Irene Hornemann	LDPD	
Walter Hruschka	FDGB	on March 28, 1962, for Rep. Svihalek moved up
Gustav Hübner	FDGB	
Max Hübner	FDGB	
Martha Israel	SED	on April 17, 1963, for Rep. M. Müller moved up
Gisela Jänsch	DFD	Berlin representative on April 17, 1963, for Dept. Saefkow moved up
Hans Jendretzky	SED	
Max Jühnichen	DBD	
Hertha Jung	CDU	Berlin representative
Karl-Heinz Just	LDPD	Berlin representative
Erna Kadow	SED	Berlin representative
Hermann Kalb	CDU	
Otto Kalb	CDU	Fled to West Germany in 1960
Hans-Joachim Kalke	DBD	
Martha Kanow	VdgB	
Fritz Karguth	SED	on April 17, 1963, for Rep. Handke moved up
Fritz Karsunke	DBD	
Rolf Kaulfersch	NDPD	
Karl Kayser	SED	
Jörgen Keiderling	LDPD	Berlin representative moved up on March 28, 1962
Wally Keller	DFD	
Katharina Kern	DFD	
Erika Kessler	NDPD	
Heinz Kessler	FDJ	
Hans Kiefert	SED	Berlin representative
Bruno Kiesler	SED	
Friedrich Kind	CDU	
Alfred Kirchner	SED	on September 30, 1959, for the Abg. H. Lehmann moved up
Franz Kirchner	CDU	
Rudolf Kirchner	FDGB	
Günter Kirsten	FDJ	
Werner Klütsch	DBD	
Herbert Koch	CDU	
Minna Köhler	SED	
Bernard Koenen	SED	
Wilhelm Koenen	SED	died on October 19, 1963
Walter König	NDPD	
Erwin Körber	DBD	
Willi-Peter Konzok	LDPD	
Gertrud Korb	KB	
Werner Kraft	NDPD	
Erwin Kramer	SED	
Erwin Krause	SED	
Johanna Krause	DBD	
Otto Krauss	LDPD	
Kurt Krenz	SED	
Horst Kreter	NDPD	
Erich Kripstädt	FDJ	Berlin representative
Herbert Kröger	SED	
Anton Krückl	CDU	
Ernst Krüger	FDGB	
Margot Krüger	NDPD	
Charlotte Küter	KB	
Alfred Kurella	SED	
Paul Kurzawa	SED	
Herbert Countryman	CDU	Berlin representative
Gerhard Lange	CDU	on March 24, 1961, for Rep. Otto Kalb moved up
Günther Lauterbach	FDJ	
Karl Laux	KB	
Erich Lehmann	FDGB	Berlin representative
Heinz Lehmann	LDPD	
Helmut Lehmann	SED	died on February 9, 1959
Irene Lehmann	DFD	
Otto Lehmann	FDGB	
Robert Lehmann	FDJ	
Fritz Leimbach	LDPD	
Johannes Leipoldt	CDU	
Arno von Lenski	NDPD	
Benno Lentzsch	FDGB	Berlin representative
Heinz Leubner	FDGB	on April 17, 1963, for Dept. Faust moved up
Harri Leupold	LDPD	Berlin representative
Bruno Leuschner	SED	
Günter Liebig	LDPD	died on February 5, 1962
Gerhard Lindner	LDPD	Berlin representative
Marianne List	LDPD	
Heinz List	DBD	
Hans Loch	LDPD	died on July 13, 1960
Manfred Löffler	LDPD	on October 19, 1962, for the Ab. A. Otto moved up
Jonny Löhr	NDPD	
Werner Lorenz	SED	
Gerhard Lucht	VdgB	
Eva Ludwig	NDPD	Berlin representative
Helmut Ludwig	NDPD	
Margaret Ludwig	FDGB	
Käte Lüders	DFD	Berlin representative
Elisabeth Lüer	FDGB	
Kurt Lüftner	NDPD	
Franz Lukowiak	CDU	
Paul Luzemann	FDGB	
Hans Marchand	LDPD	
Erich Markowitsch	SED	
Karl Maron	SED	
Hans-Joachim Martens	LDPD	Complementary to a semi-public textile company
Werner Marx	DBD	Berlin representative
Heinz-Wolfram Mascher	CDU	Berlin representative arrested on August 26, 1961
Werner Masseck	NDPD	deceased on August 27, 1962
Hermann Matern	SED	1st Deputy President of the People's Chamber
Klaus Matschoß	FDJ	Berlin representative
Georg Matthias	DBD	
Friedrich Mayer	CDU	
Georg Mayer	SED	
Walter Mechler	LDPD	
Heinrich Meier	NDPD	
Helene Meinhold	DFD	
Horst Meischner	NDPD	
Kurt Menger	DBD	Berlin representative
Other Brand	DBD	
Alexander Mette	KB	Berlin representative
Alfred Meusel	KB	deceased on September 10, 1960
Charlotte Mewes	DFD	
Karl Mewis	SED	
Erich Mielke	SED	
Rudolf Mitschke	SED	Berlin representative on April 17, 1963, for Rep. Dohne moved up
Hans Modrow	FDJ	Berlin representative
Otto Möller	NDPD	
Heinrich Moritz	CDU	
Karl Mörl	CDU	
Helga Mucke-Wittbrodt	DFD	
Erich Mückenberger	SED	
Frieda Müller	DBD	Berlin representative
Hans Müller	FDGB	Berlin representative died on March 12, 1962
Helmut Müller	FDJ	
Max Müller	SED	no longer a Member of Parliament from April 17, 1963
Gerhard Münch	NDPD	
Karl Namokel	FDJ	
Luise Nattermüller	DFD	
Hans Nechels	SED	
Barbara Neuhaus	DBD	Berlin representative
Heinz Neukrantz	FDGB	Berlin representative
Alfred Neumann	SED	
Anni Neumann	FDGB	
Wilhelm Neumann	FDGB	died April 17, 1963
Elisabeth Nitschke	DFD	
Albert Norden	SED	
Hans-Georg Oehm	CDU	
Georg Ohm	SED	
Dora Opitz	DFD	
Max Opitz	SED	
Josef Orlopp	FDGB	Berlin representative died on April 7, 1960
Ernst Ostermeyer	LDPD	deceased on June 23, 1962
Herbert Ott	LDPD	
Adolf Otto	LDPD	deceased on April 7, 1962
Martha Pässold	DBD	
Fritz Panteleit	DBD	
Margarethe Paul	NDPD	
Willy Perk	FDGB	Berlin representative on April 17, 1963, for the deputy H. Müller moved up
Walter Petersohn	SED	
Friedrich Pfaffenbach	NDPD	Berlin representative
Susanne Pfannenberg	CDU	
Paul Pflock	LDPD	
Erwin Pingel	DBD	
Werner mushroom	FDJ	
Hans Pitra	KB	Berlin representative
Anneliese Pischker	DFD	
Alois Pisnik	SED	
Anton Plenikowski	SED	
Arthur Ploetz	SED	
Brigitte Pluntke	FDJ	
Hans-Joachim Pohl	KB	on April 17, 1963, for Rep. Franck moved up
Karl Polak	SED	
Emil Posch	LDPD	
Lydia Poser	SED	
Charlotte Praechter	DFD	
Charlotte Praße	DFD	
Elfriede Prautzsch	DFD	
Ernst Pridöhl	LDPD	deceased on June 23, 1961
Günter Prillwitz	FDGB	
Emma Puppel	VdgB	
Bernhard Quandt	SED	
Ernst-August Rabe	LDPD	
Wolfgang Ranft	CDU	
Erich Rätsch	SED	
Heinrich Rau	SED	deceased on March 23, 1961
Herbert Recknagel	CDU	
Fritz Reck	SED	Berlin representative
Hans Reichelt	DBD	
Rudi Reichert	FDJ	
Paul Reim	SED	Berlin representative
Helmut Ressel	CDU	on January 24, 1962, for Rep. Saxons moved up
Elli Reuter	DFD	
Fritz Reuter	SED	
Hermann Richter	NDPD	on October 4, 1960, for the Ab. Thiele moved up
Walter Riedel	CDU	
Hans Rietz	DBD	
Heinz Ritter	LDPD	
Ilse Rodenberg	NDPD	Berlin representative
Heinz Röhrer	CDU	
Hansjürgen Rösner	CDU	
Wolfgang Rösser	NDPD	
Berthold Rose	DBD	
Fritz Rosenmüller	NDPD	
Herbert Rosenthal	NDPD	died on July 3, 1962
Florentiene Rossa	DFD	Berlin representative Resignation announced on July 31, 1963
Ewald Roßbach	DBD	
Erich Rost	LDPD	Berlin representative on April 25, 1960, for the Dept. Engelhardt moved up
Siegfried Roth	NDPD	
Christian-Wilhelm Rowoldt	NDPD	
Otto Rühle	NDPD	
Willy hull	SED	
Other Runge	DFD	
Hermann Ruthenberg	SED	
Wolfgang Saxony	CDU	died on February 4, 1961
Otto Sadler	CDU	
Aenne Saefkow	SED	Berlin representative deceased on August 4, 1962
Gertrud Sasse	LDPD	
Max Skull	FDGB	
Elisabeth Schäfer	NDPD	
Willy Schäfer	DBD	
Ella Schaffernicht	SED	
Herbert Schalwat	FDGB	
Rudi Scheffler	SED	
Anita Scherf	FDJ	
Josef Schicketanz	SED	on January 24, 1962, for Rep. Rough moved up
Helga Schilling	FDJ	Berlin representative
Wilhelmine Schirmer-Pröscher	DFD	Deputy President of the People's Chamber
Walter Schlee	NDPD	
Otto Schlegelmilch	FDGB	
Josef grindstone	KB	
Paula Schlitter	DFD	
Ursula Schlosser	VdgB	
Ella Schmidt	FDGB	
Else Schmidt	DBD	
Kurt Schmidt	SED	
Richard Schmidt	SED	
Berthold Schmitt	SED	
Brunhilde Schmook	DFD	
Günter Schneider	LDPD	
Hans Schneidereit	SED	Berlin representative
Hans Schnitzler	DBD	
Ernst Scholz	SED	
Georg Scholz	LDPD	
Paul Scholz	DBD	
Eva beautiful	FDGB	
Otto Schön	SED	
Edelfried Schoppe	CDU	
Karl-Heinz Schoolmaster	KB	
Margarete Schulz	SED	Berlin representative
Elfriede Schulze	DFD	died on July 25, 1963
Rudolph Schulze	CDU	
Gustav-Adolf Schur	FDJ	
Kurt Schwarz	LDPD	
Otto Schwarz	KB	
Richard Black	NDPD	on April 17, 1963, for Rep. Masseck moved up
Max Sefrin	CDU	
Annelore Sehm	FDGB	
Kurt Seibt	SED	
Karl Seidenstricker	SED	on April 25, 1960, for Rep. Giebner moved up
Ernst Seifert	FDGB	
Alfred Seiffarth	NDPD	
Hans Seigewasser	SED	
Fritz Selbmann	SED	
Charlotte Sembdner	NDPD	
Max Seydewitz	SED	
Ewald Sieg	DBD	no longer a Member of Parliament from October 4, 1960
Gustav Siemon	NDPD	Berlin representative
Max Simon	NDPD	Resignation announced on July 31, 1963
Paul Simon	SED	
Renate Simon	FDJ	
Klaus Sorgenicht	SED	
Hermann Spencker	LDPD	
Erich Spiering	DBD	
Gerhard Spremberg	SED	
Max Staffeldt	CDU	
Max Steffen	SED	
Luitpold Steidle	CDU	
Siegfried Steudte	FDJ	
Willi Stoph	SED	
Franz Striemann	FDGB	
Edgar stockings	DBD	
Karl Svihalek	FDGB	
Ludmilla Tampier	DFD	
Ingeburg Tauschke	VdgB	
Rosa Thälmann	DFD	deceased on September 21, 1962
Heinz Thiele	NDPD	no longer a Member of Parliament from October 4, 1960
Ilse Thiele	DFD	
Fritz Thiemes	DBD	Berlin representative
Wilhelm Thiemke	SED	Berlin representative
Walter Thierfelder	LDPD	
Paul Thomas	CDU	
Walter Thürmer	LDPD	
Walter Tille	FDGB	
Heinrich Toeplitz	CDU	
Curt Trepte	KB	on July 6, 1961, for the Ab. E. Franz moved up
Erich Uhlich	SED	
Walter Ulbricht	SED	
Wilhelm Ullrich	LDPD	Berlin representative
Lydia Uncertain	FDGB	
Irma Uschkamp	DFD	
Paul Verner	SED	
Werner quarter	FDGB	
Kurt Voigt	SED	Berlin representative
Paul Voitel	SED	
Fritz Waack	SED	
Herbert Warnke	SED	
Johannes Warnke	SED	
Erich Wegner	DBD	
Friedrich Wehmer	VdgB	
Cecilie Weidenbach-Blum	FDGB	
Elsa Weigelt	SED	
Christian Weißbach	LDPD	deceased on March 24, 1962
Fritz Weißhaupt	DBD	Berlin representative
Erich Wendt	KB	
Kurt Wendt	SED	Berlin representative
Josef Wenig	FDGB	
Martin Wenzke	NDPD	on April 17, 1963, for Rep. André moved up
Otto Werner	DBD	
Wilhelm Werner	NDPD	
Harald Werthmann	LDPD	
Richard O. Wilhelm	LDPD	on April 25, 1960, for Rep. Angermann moved up
Hans-Joachim Winkler	FDGB	
Luise Winkler	VdgB	Berlin representative
Otto winemaker	SED	
Klaus Wolf	DBD	
Richard Wolf	SED	Berlin representative
Fritz Wolff	LDPD	
Horst Wolter	FDJ	
Lucie Wolter	FDJ	
Werner Wolter	DBD	
Wolfgang Wonderful	FDJ	
Kurt Wishes	LDPD	
Alfred Zirnstein	DBD	
Arnold Zweig	KB	

== Sources ==
- Volkskammer der DDR Protokolle der Sitzungen der Volkskammer in der 3. Wahlperiode 1958–1963
- Volkskammer der DDR Handbuch der Volkskammer der DDR 3. Wahlperiode Kongreß-Verlag Berlin, 1959
