= Heinz Eichler =

Former Secretary of the State Council of East Germany

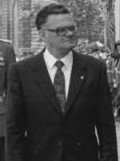

Secretary of the State Council
- In office 26 November 1971 – 16 November 1989
- Preceded by: Otto Gotsche
- Succeeded by: Office abolished

Personal details
- Born: Heinz Eichler; 14 November 1927 Leipzig, Weimar Republic
- Died: 12 September 2013 (aged 85) Berlin, Germany
- Citizenship: Germany East Germany (until 1990) Nazi Germany (1933–1945) Weimar Republic (1927–1933)
- Party: Socialist Unity Party
- Other political affiliations: Free German Youth Communist Party of Germany Nazi Party (until 1945)

Heinz Eichler (14 November 1927 – 12 September 2013) was a German politician who served as the Secretary of the State Council of the German Democratic Republic commonly known as East Germany.

== Early life and education ==
Heinz Eichler was born to a working-class family in Leipzig. He joined the National Socialist German Workers' Party (Nazi Party) in 1944 at the age of sixteen. He graduated from the University of Leipzig in 1950. In 1960, he also graduated from the Academy of Social Sciences of the Communist Party of the Soviet Union in Moscow.

== Political career ==
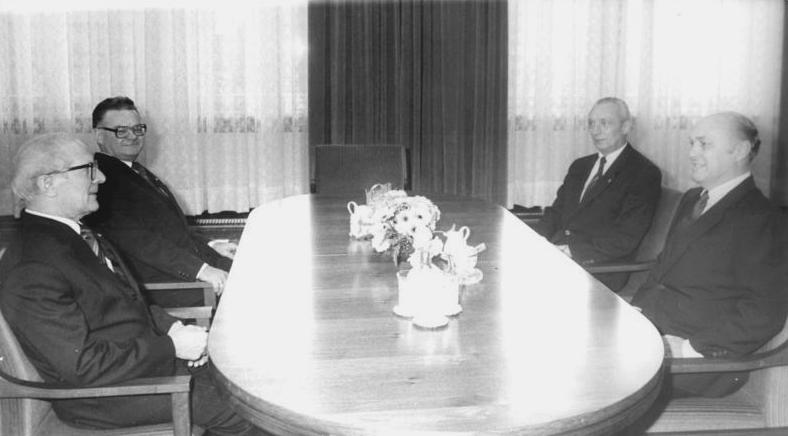
Eichler (2nd from left) in the accreditation of the US Ambassador Richard Clark Barkley, 1988

After World War II, Eichler became an employee of the Oschatz District Council. He joined the Communist Party of Germany and became a member of the Oschatz District Anti-Fascist Youth Committee. In 1946, Eichler joined the Free German Youth and became a member of the Socialist Unity Party after the merger of the KPD and SPD into the Socialist Unity Party of Germany. After taking courses at the Socialist Unity Party State Party School in Ottendorf, Eichler was elected to the Oschatz District Board of the Socialist Unity Party of Germany and remained there until 1948. After completing his studies in 1950, Eichler became a main clerk in the Ministry of the Interior. Upon returning to East Germany in 1960, Eichler worked as a personal assistant for Walter Ulbricht until 1971. He succeeded Otto Gotsche as the Secretary of the State Council in 1971 and served in this position until November 16, 1989.

From 1971 to March 1990, Eichler was a member of the Socialist Unity Party (SED) parliamentary group of the Volkskammer and also a member of the executive committee. On January 3, 1990, Eichler was summoned for a hearing by the interim Volkskammer Committee to review cases of abuse of office, corruption, personal gain and other acts suspected of violating the law and questioned about the former Schorfheide special hunting area.

== Death ==
Heinz Eichler died on September 12, 2013, at the age of 85 in Berlin, Germany. He was buried at the Baumschulenweg Cemetery located in Berlin.

== Awards ==
(East Germany) Patriotic Order of Merit in Gold (1977)

(East Germany) Patriotic Order of Merit in Silver (twice)

(East Germany) Banner of Labor 1st Class

(East Germany) Battle medal "For Services to the People and Fatherland" in Gold

(East Germany) Medal of Merit of the GDR

== See also ==
- State Council of East Germany
- Socialist Unity Party
