= Margarete Müller =

German politician (1931–2024)

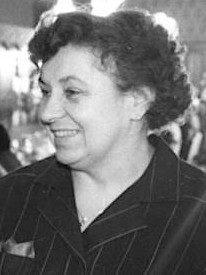
Müller in 1988

Margarete Müller (18 February 1931 – 12 October 2024) was a German politician who was a member of the State Council of East Germany and, between 1963 and 1989, of the Central Committee of the Socialist Unity Party of Germany (SED). She was a candidate member of the SED politburo until the end of the one-party system.

== Life and career ==
Müller was born in Neustadt, Upper Silesia, into a working-class family. She was forced to move to Mecklenburg after the Second World War, and became a tractor driver. In 1951, Müller joined the SED. She studied agricultural science in Demmin and at the University of Leningrad until 1958. She then worked at an LPG collective farm near Galenbeck.

In January 1963, Müller joined the Central Committee (ZK) of the SED and a candidate (non-voting member) of the politburo. She was also elected to the Volkskammer. Then, in 1971, she was appointed to the State Council, East Germany's collective head of state. She held responsibility for agriculture, forestry and food production. She led a Kooperative Abteilung Pflanzenproduktion (1972–1976) and an Agrar-Industrie-Vereinigung (1976).

Müller resigned along with the entire politburo in 1989 during the Peaceful Revolution, and resigned from the State Council and Volkskammer in January 1990. She was expelled from the SED-PDS.

Müller died on 12 October 2024, at the age of 93.

== Awards ==
Müller received several significant awards and honours:

- Patriotic Order of Merit in Silver (1964)
- Banner of Labor (1969)
- Order of Karl Marx (1974)
- Patriotic Order of Merit in Gold (1981)
- Clara Zetkin Medal
- Medal of Merit of the GDR
- Artur Becker Medal in Gold
