= Else Merke =

German politician (1920–2005)

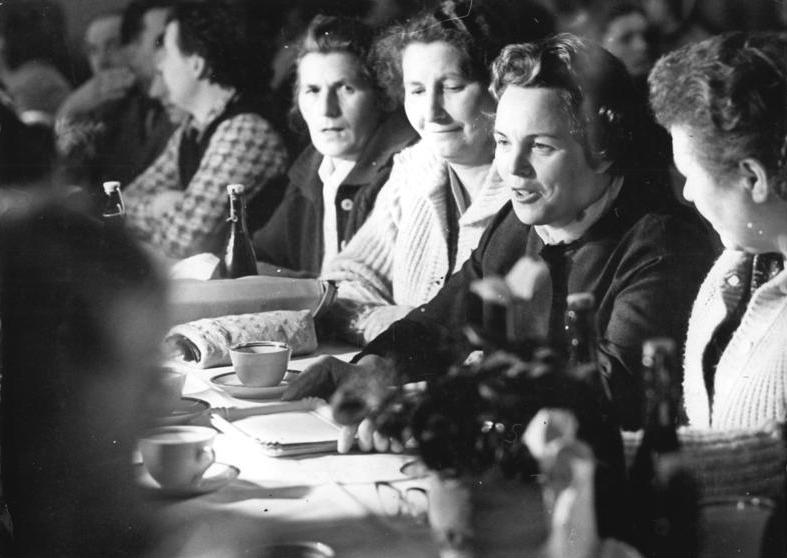
Merke at an assembly in 1966

Else Merke (15 June 1920 – 6 March 2005) was a member of the State Council of East Germany, the country's collective head of state, from 1963 until 1971.

== Life ==
Merke was born in 1920 in Stargard, then part of Prussia. After school she worked on her parents' farm. At the end of World War II, Merke was expelled and resettled in the Soviet occupation zone. Merke and her husband became farmers in Schenkenberg, where they founded one of the first LPG collective farms in 1952.

In 1948 Merke joined the Democratic Farmers' Party of Germany (DBD). In 1953 she was elected to the Volkskammer, remaining a member until 1986. Between 1963 and 1990 Merke was on her party's executive committee.

In 1950 she became a member of the Democratic Women's League of Germany (DFD), and later its deputy chairwoman in 1964. She participated in the 1953 Women's International Democratic Federation Congress in Copenhagen.

Merke was awarded the Clara Zetkin Medal in 1958, the Patriotic Order of Merit in 1966, and the Star of People's Friendship in 1985. She died in 2005 in Schenkenberg.
