= State Council of East Germany =

Collective head of state of the German Democratic Republic

State Council of the German Democratic Republic
- Staatsrat der DDR
- Emblem

- Flag of the chairman of the State Council

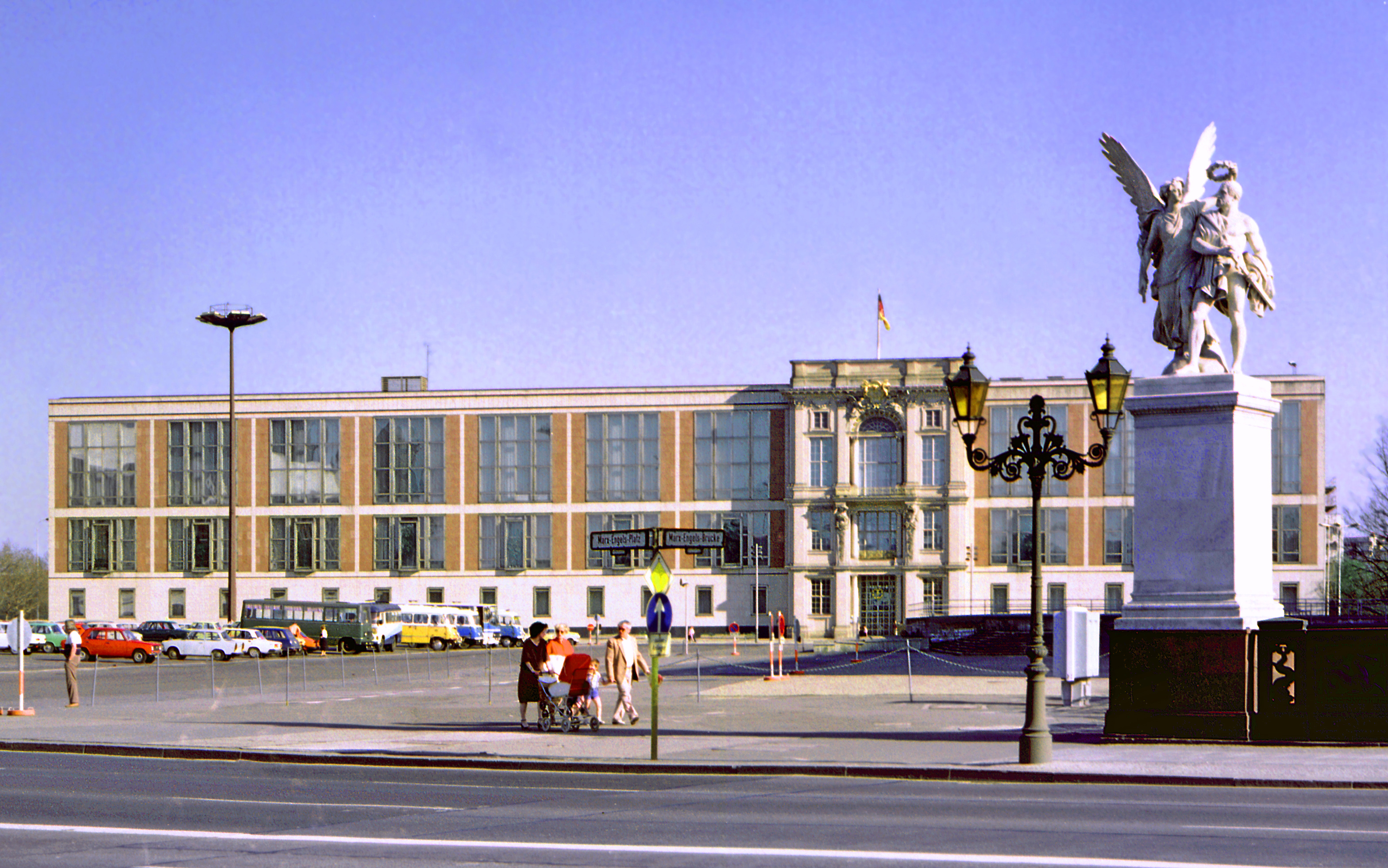
- State Council Building, East Berlin
- Type: Collective head of state
- Status: Dissolved
- Appointer: Volkskammer
- Term length: 5 years
- Constituting instrument: Constitution of East Germany
- Precursor: President of the German Democratic Republic
- Formation: 12 September 1960
- Abolished: 5 April 1990

The State Council of the German Democratic Republic (German: Staatsrat der DDR) was the collective head of state of the German Democratic Republic, most commonly referred to as East Germany, from 1960 to 1990. However, it lost most legal authority upon the downfall of Walter Ulbricht, with leaders increasingly drawing power from party posts rather than state office.

== Origins ==
When the German Democratic Republic was founded in October 1949, its constitution specified the form of a parliamentary democracy, though the government was actually highly authoritarian in terms of control. One of the "bourgeois" features of the constitution (in Article 66) was the office of President, which was filled by Wilhelm Pieck, formerly the leader of the eastern branch of the Communist Party of Germany and now one of the two chairmen of the Socialist Unity Party of Germany (SED).

However, from the start, the East German government was completely controlled by the SED, and over time its actual power structure grew closer to the model of the Soviet Union. When Pieck died on 7 September 1960, the SED opted against electing a successor, instead opting for a Soviet-style collective head of state. The constitution was amended on 12 September 1960 by the Law concerning the formation of the State Council, which created a collective body in place of the presidency. The same constitutional amendment also acknowledged the role of the recently formed National Defense Council (Nationaler Verteidigungsrat) in GDR defense policy. In the 1968 constitution, which formally defined the GDR as a socialist state under the leadership of the SED, the State Council was brought closer to the Soviet model, as it was now officially designated as the standing organ of the Volkskammer (itself rechristened as the supreme organ of state power within a one-branch system). Its official role was later downplayed in the 1974 constitutional amendments.

== Election ==
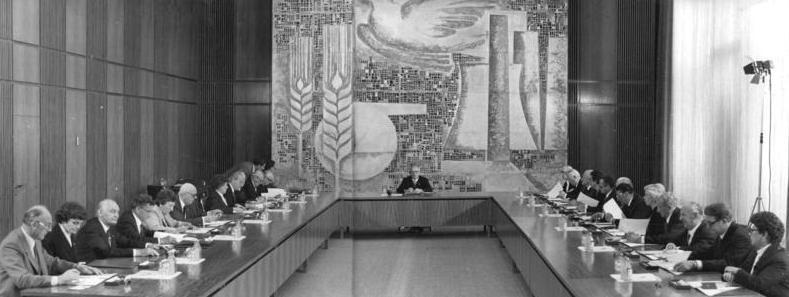
Session of the State Council, 25 June 1981

The State Council was elected by the People's Chamber, the East German parliament. Its term was originally four years, but was later changed to five years.

The body consisted of a chairman, several deputy chairmen (initially six), further members (initially sixteen) and a secretary. Members were taken from the political parties and mass organizations affiliated to the SED-controlled National Front. Occasionally an otherwise prominent citizen was also included. Outside of East Germany, the chairman's post was reckoned as being equivalent to that of president.

On paper, the Chairman of the State Council was the second highest ranking state official in East Germany, following the Chairman of the Council of Ministers. In practice, however, the chairmanship was occupied by the leader of the SED for all but a few years of its existence. The sole exceptions were the period of transition from the leadership of Walter Ulbricht to Erich Honecker from 1971 to 1976 and the immediate aftermath of the SED's collapse in 1989. The leaders of the smaller parties in the National Front served as deputy chairmen on the council.

== Constitutional powers ==
Powers of the State council included

- to call elections to the People's Chamber and other parliamentary bodies
- to appoint members to the National Defense Council
- to grant pardon, amnesty and reprieves
- to ratify international treaties
- to grant diplomatic accreditation
- to grant decorations and awards
- to sponsor families with many children

Originally, the State Council also could issue statutory decrees and legally-binding interpretations of the constitution and laws. The diplomatic role of head of state solely rested with the chairman. Both the body's legislative and judicial powers and the chairman's special diplomatic status were formally abolished in 1974.

Though the Council formally exercised its functions collectively, it was dominated by its chairman, especially if the chairman was also leader of the SED. In contrast, the predecessor post of president was a relatively weak position. However, the body had some importance as an advisory and decision-making body under Walter Ulbricht. When Ulbricht lost power in the early 1970s, the body was reduced to a ceremonial role. The 1974 amendments reflected this development; when Honecker became chairman in 1976, he derived virtually all of his power from his post as leader of the SED.

The secretariat of the State Council was of some practical importance as its approximately 200 employees since 1961 dealt with citizens' petitions. Authorities in government and economics were obliged to cooperate with the secretariat on this.

== Abolition ==
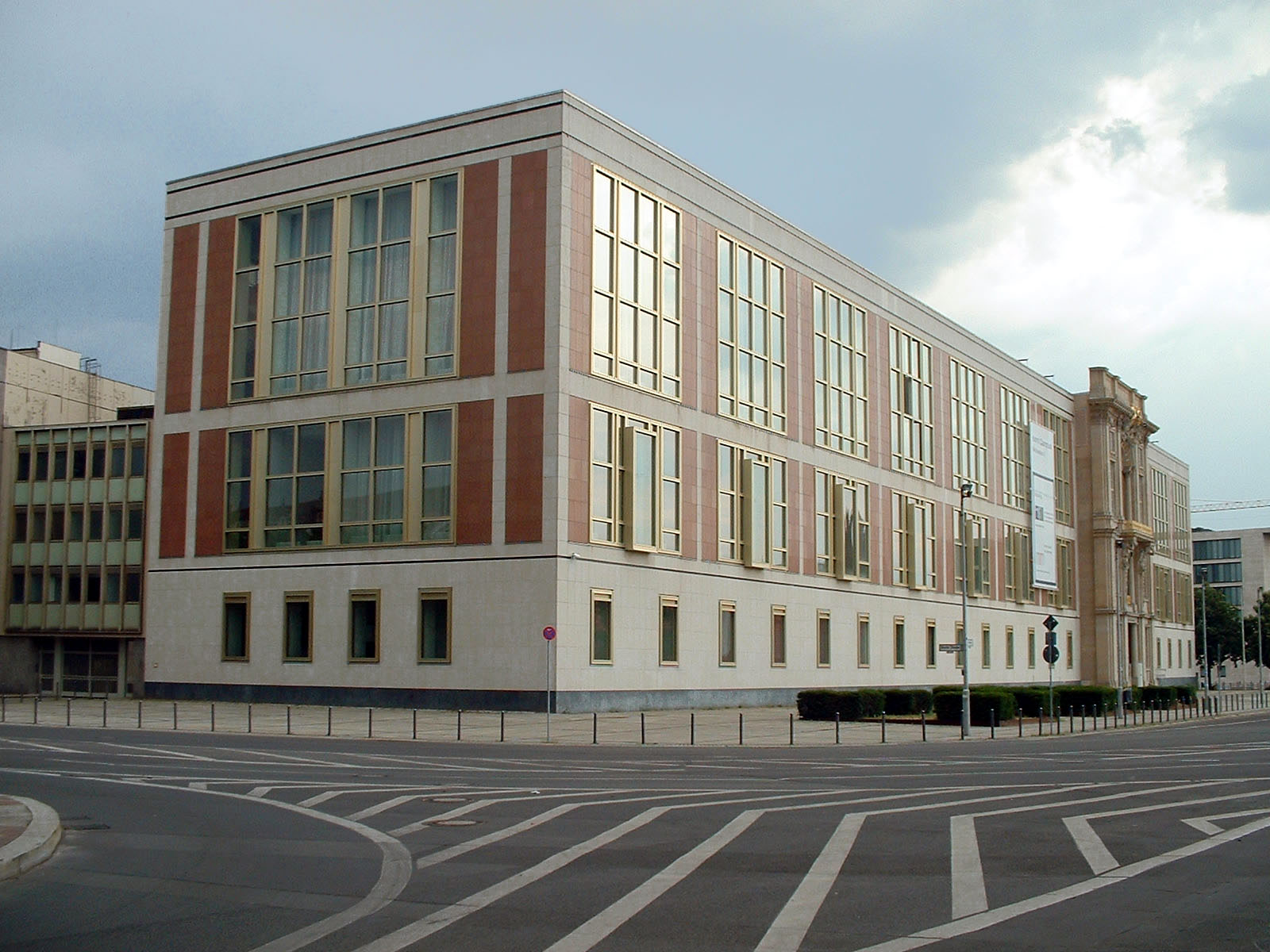
State Council Building, East Berlin

When Egon Krenz, Honecker's successor as leader of the SED, failed in his bid to preserve Communist rule in East Germany, he resigned from his offices in party and government, including as Chairman of the State Council. To mark the end of the SED's monopoly on power, LDPD leader Manfred Gerlach was elected chairman. However, the body ceased to be of political importance and merely oversaw the transition to the parliamentary elections of March 1990.

The new People's Chamber, the first that emerged from free elections, met for the first time on 5 April 1990. Among its first measures was an amendment to the constitution abolishing the State Council. As provided in the constitution, the Presidium of the People's Chamber, headed by President Sabine Bergmann-Pohl, served as interim head of state until reunification with West Germany on 3 October.

== List of members ==
Chairman	Political party	Took office	Left office
Walter Ulbricht	SED	12 September 1960	1 August 1973
State Council elected 12 September 1960: Deputy chairmen: Otto Grotewohl (SED); Johannes Dieckmann (LDPD); Gerald Götting (CDU); Heinrich Homann (NDPD); Manfred Gerlach (LDPD); Hans Rietz (DBD); Members: Günter Christoph (SED), Erich Correns (KB), Friedrich Ebert (SED), Luise Ermisch (SED), Erich Grützner (FDGB), Friedrich Kind (CDU), Bernard Koenen (SED), Otto Krauss (LDPD), Bruno Leuschner (SED), Karl Mewis (SED), Irmgard Neumann (DBD/DFD), Karl Polak (SED), Karl Rieke (SED), Hans Rodenberg (SED), Horst Schumann (FDJ), Peter Adolf Thiessen (non-affiliated); Secretary: Otto Gotsche (SED)
State Council elected 13 November 1963: Deputy chairmen: Otto Grotewohl (SED, died 21 September 1964); Johannes Dieckmann (LDPD); Gerald Götting (CDU); Heinrich Homann (NDPD); Manfred Gerlach (LDPD); Hans Rietz (DBD); Members: Erich Correns (KB), Friedrich Ebert (SED), Erich Grützner (SED), Lieselott Herforth (FDGB), Friedrich Kind (CDU), Bernard Koenen (SED), Else Merke (DBD), Günter Mittag (SED), Christel Pappe (FDGB), Karl Rieke (SED), Hans Rodenberg (SED), Horst Schumann (FDJ), Klaus Sorgenicht (SED), Christian Steinmüller (NDPD), Willi Stoph (SED), Paul Strauß (SED); Secretary: Otto Gotsche (SED)
State Council elected 13 July 1967: Deputy chairmen: Willi Stoph (SED); Johannes Dieckmann (LDPD, died 22 February 1969); Gerald Götting (CDU); Heinrich Homann (NDPD); Manfred Gerlach (LDPD); Hans Rietz (DBD); Members: Erich Correns (KB), Friedrich Ebert (SED), Erich Grützner (SED), Brunhilde Hanke (SED), Lieselott Herforth (FDGB), Friedrich Kind (CDU), Else Merke (DBD), Günter Mittag (SED), Anni Neumann (FDGB), Karl Rieke (SED), Hans Rodenberg (SED), Maria Schneider (FDGB), Horst Schumann (SED), Hans-Simon Schneider (NDPD), Klaus Sorgenicht (SED), Paul Strauß (SED) elected 1969: Bruno Thalmann (LDPD); Secretary: Otto Gotsche (SED)
State Council elected 26 November 1971: Deputy chairmen: Friedrich Ebert (SED, acting chairman 1 August – 3 October 1973); Willi Stoph (SED); Gerald Götting (CDU); Heinrich Homann (NDPD); Manfred Gerlach (LDPD); Hans Rietz (DBD); Members: Kurt Anclam (LDPD), Friedrich Clermont (SED), Erich Correns (KB), Willi Grandetzka (DBD), Erich Grützner (SED), Brunhilde Hanke (SED), Lieselott Herforth (FDGB), Erich Honecker (SED), Friedrich Kind (CDU), Margarete Müller (SED), Hans Rodenberg (SED), Klaus Sorgenicht (SED), Paul Strauß (SED), Ilse Thiele (DFD), Paul Verner (SED), Rosel Walther (NDPD), Herbert Warnke (SED); Secretary: Heinz Eichler (SED)
Willi Stoph	SED	3 October 1973	29 October 1976
Composition see above.
Erich Honecker	SED	29 October 1976	24 October 1989
State Council elected 29 October 1976: Deputy chairmen: Friedrich Ebert (SED, died 4 December 1979); Willi Stoph (SED); Horst Sindermann (SED); Gerald Götting (CDU); Heinrich Homann (NDPD); Manfred Gerlach (LDPD); Ernst Goldenbaum (DBD); Members: Kurt Anclam (LDPD), Erich Correns (KB), Willi Grandetzka (DBD, died 14 April 1979), Kurt Hager (SED), Brunhilde Hanke (SED), Lieselott Herforth (FDGB), Friedrich Kind (CDU), Margarete Müller (SED), Albert Norden (SED), Bernhard Quandt (SED), Klaus Sorgenicht (SED), Paul Strauß (SED), Ilse Thiele (DFD), Harry Tisch (SED), Paul Verner (SED), Rosel Walther (NDPD) elected 1979: Werner Seifert (DBD); Secretary: Heinz Eichler (SED)
State Council elected 25 June 1981: Deputy chairmen: Willi Stoph (SED); Horst Sindermann (SED); Paul Verner (SED); Gerald Götting (CDU); Heinrich Homann (NDPD); Manfred Gerlach (LDPD); Ernst Goldenbaum (DBD); Members: Kurt Anclam (LDPD), Werner Felfe (SED), Kurt Hager (SED), Brunhilde Hanke (SED), Friedrich Kind (CDU), Egon Krenz (FDJ), Günter Mittag (SED), Margarete Müller (SED), Alois Pisnik (SED), Bernhard Quandt (SED), Werner Seifert (DBD), Klaus Sorgenicht (SED), Paul Strauß (SED), Ilse Thiele (DFD), Harry Tisch (SED), Johanna Töpfer (FDGB), Rosel Walther (NDPD), Secretary: Heinz Eichler (SED)
State Council elected 16 June 1986: Deputy chairmen: Willi Stoph (SED, resigned 16 November 1989); Horst Sindermann (SED, resigned 16 November 1989); Egon Krenz (SED, elected chairman 24 October 1989, resigned 6 December 1989); Günter Mittag (SED); Gerald Götting (CDU, dismissed 7 November 1989); Heinrich Homann (NDPD); Manfred Gerlach (LDPD, elected chairman 6 December 1989); Günther Maleuda (DBD); Members: Eberhard Aurich (FDJ, resigned 29 January 1990), Fritz Dallmann (VdgB), Werner Felfe (SED, died 7 September 1988), Kurt Hager (SED, resigned 16 November 1989), Brunhilde Hanke (SED), Leonhard Helmschrott (DBD), Friedrich Kind (CDU), Eveline Klett (DFD), Lothar Kolditz (KB), Peter Moreth (LDPD), Margarete Müller (SED), Alois Pisnik (SED), Bernhard Quandt (SED), Klaus Sorgenicht (SED, resigned 29 January 1990), Paul Strauß (SED), Ilse Thiele (DFD), Harry Tisch (SED, resigned 16 November 1989), Johanna Töpfer (FDGB), Rosel Walther (NDPD), Monika Werner (SED) elected 1988: Peter Florin (SED), Werner Krolikowski (SED, resigned 16 November 1989) elected 17 November 1989: Manfred Mühlmann (NDPD), Gerhard Lindner (LDPD); Secretary: Heinz Eichler (SED, resigned 16 November 1989)
Egon Krenz	SED	24 October 1989	6 December 1989
Composition see above.
Manfred Gerlach	LDPD	6 December 1989	5 April 1990
Composition see above.

== See also ==
- Council of Ministers of East Germany
