= Irmgard Neumann =

German politician (1925–1989)

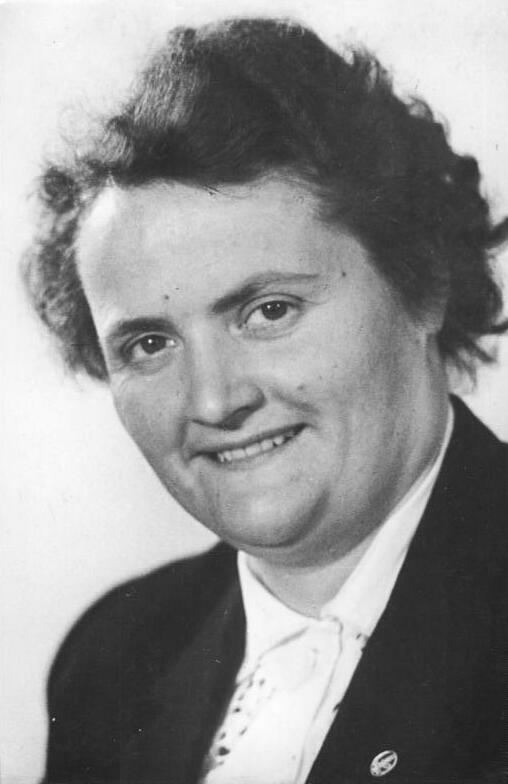

Member of the State Council
- In office September 1960 – November 1963

Personal details
- Born: 16 October 1925; Hamburg, Germany
- Died: 22 February 1989 (age 64)
- Political party: Democratic Farmers' Party of Germany

Irmgard Neumann (née Pulß, 16 October 1925 – 22 February 1989) was a member of the State Council of East Germany, the country's collective head of state.

== Life ==
Neumann was born in Hamburg. After graduation from the Volksschule she worked as a housemaid. Following the Second World War and subsequent creation of the German Democratic Republic, Neumann became a farmer at a collective farm (Landwirtschaftliche Produktionsgenossenschaft) near Teterow.

In 1955 Neumann joined the Democratic Farmers' Party of Germany (DBD), a bloc party of the National Front. She was a member of the legislature of the Bezirk Neubrandenburg from 1958. In 1960 she joined the executive committee of the Democratic Women's League of Germany. In September of the same year she was elected to the State Council, of which she remained a member until November 1963. Neumann attained a leading role in the DBD in 1963, which she held until 1977.

Neumann was awarded the Patriotic Order of Merit in 1966. She died in 1989.
