= Maria Schneider (politician) =

- Born: 9 February 1923; Merka (Bautzen), Saxony, Germany
- Political party: SED

Maria Schneider (born 9 February 1923) is a German former (SED) politician. She was a member of the East German State Council between 1967 and 1971.

== Life ==
Maria Schneider was born in Merka (Měrkow) a rural German settlement then of approximately 160 inhabitants, 10 km (6 miles) north of Bautzen and approximately 25 km (15 miles) north of the frontier with a recently created country called Czechoslovakia. Her father was a Sorbian farm worker. She left school at fifteen and embarked on a three-year commercial apprenticeship which lasted from 1938 till 1941. After this she worked as a commercial assistant and secretary.

In May 1945, World War II ended and with it, the Hitler regime fell. In Germany, political parties and organisations that had been banned under the Nazis were no longer banned, and on 10 May 1945 the main Sorbian organization, Domowina, was reinstated just five days after the end of hostilities in this part of Germany. Maria Schneider joined Domowina that same year. In 1948 she joined the Trades Union Federation (FDGB / Freier Deutscher Gewerkschaftsbund ) of what was at this point still designated the Soviet occupation zone. Although the German Democratic Republic was founded as a stand-alone Soviet sponsored state only in October 1949, the basis for a return to one- party government had already been created Soviet administration in April 1946, with the contentious merger of the old Communist Party with the Moderate-left SPD. In 1948 Maria Schneider joined what would become the new country's ruling Socialist Unity Party of Germany (SED / Sozialistische Einheitspartei Deutschlands). She also, in 1948, joined the Democratic Women's League of Germany (DFD / Demokratische Frauenbund Deutschlands), one of several Soviet style Mass organisations that had recently been established in the Soviet occupation zone.

From 1952 till 1958 Schneider worked as an instructor on women's work with the MTS Luttowitz, a machinery and tractor depot serving the collectivised agricultural operations in the Bautzen district. She then worked at the same institution between 1958 and 1962 as Head of the Labour department. She combined this with a senior clerical position at the VEB (i.e. publicly owned) Elektroporzellan (Electro-porcelain) component factory at Großdubrau.

A period of study followed, and until 1964 she attended the Industrial Institute at the Ilmenau University of Technology, emerging with a degree in Engineering Economics. In 1964 she became an assistant to the Economics Director with the large Bautzen facility of the "VEB Fernmeldewerk Leipzig" telecommunications corporation, herself becoming the Economics Director in 1971.

As the institutions of the young country settled down, Maria Schneider moved into politics. She had already served as a "community representative" from 1949 until 1953, and in 1957, she became a local councilor for the Bautzen district. In 1967 she moved into national politics, sitting as a representative of the Trades Union Federation (FDGB) in the National Legislature (Volkskammer), where she continued to sit until 1976. Between 1971 and 1976, she was also a member of the assembly's Committee for Industry, Construction and Transport. In addition, between 1967 and 1971, she was a member of the State Council in succession to Christel Pappe.
