= Sabine Bergmann-Pohl =

German politician, last leader of East Germany

Sabine Bergmann-Pohl Bundesministerin a. D.
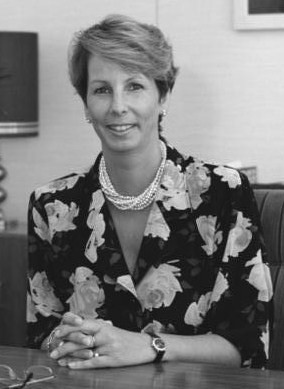
- Bergmann-Pohl in 1990

Head of state of East Germany
- Interim
- In office 5 April 1990 – 2 October 1990
- Minister-President: Hans Modrow; Lothar de Maizière
- Preceded by: Manfred Gerlach (as Chairman of the State Council)
- Succeeded by: Richard von Weizsäcker (as President of Germany)

President of the Volkskammer
- In office 5 April 1990 – 2 October 1990
- Deputy: See list: Reinhard Höppner; Käte Niederkirchner; Stefan Gottschall; Jürgen Schmieder; Wolfgang Ullmann; Dieter Helm
- Preceded by: Günther Maleuda
- Succeeded by: Rita Süssmuth (as President of the Bundestag)

Minister for Special Affairs
- In office 3 October 1990 – 18 January 1991 Serving with Rudolf Seiters, Hans Klein, Günther Krause, Lothar de Maizière, Rainer Ortleb, Hansjoachim Walther
- Chancellor: Helmut Kohl
- Preceded by: Position established
- Succeeded by: Position abolished

Parliamentary State Secretary in the Ministry of Health
- In office 18 January 1991 – 26 October 1998
- Chancellor: Helmut Kohl
- Minister: Gerda Hasselfeldt; Horst Seehofer
- Preceded by: Anton Pfeifer
- Succeeded by: Christa Nickels
Parliamentary constituencies
Member of the Bundestag for Berlin (Volkskammer; 1990)
In office 3 October 1990 – 17 October 2002
Preceded by	Constituency established
Succeeded by	multi-member district
Member of the Volkskammer for East Berlin
In office 5 April 1990 – 2 October 1990
Preceded by	Constituency established
Succeeded by	Constituency abolished

Personal details
- Born: Sabine Schulz; 20 April 1946 (age 80) Eisenach, Thuringia, Soviet occupation zone, Allied-occupied Germany (now Germany)
- Party: Christian Democratic Union (1990–)
- Other political affiliations: Christian Democratic Union (East) (1981–1990)
- Spouses: Ulrich Pohl (m. 1972–1979) Jürgen Bergmann (m. 1990)
- Children: 2
- Education: Humboldt University of Berlin (Dr. med.)
- Occupation: Politician; Physician; nonprofit CEO

Sabine Bergmann-Pohl (née Schulz; German: [zaˈbiːnə ˈbɛʁkman poːl]; born 20 April 1946) is a German doctor and politician. A member of the Christian Democratic Union of Germany (CDU), she was president of the Volkskammer (People's Chamber) of East Germany from April to October 1990. During this time, she was also the interim head of state of East Germany, holding both posts until the state's merger into West Germany in October. She was the youngest, only female and the last head of state of East Germany. After the reunification of Germany, she served in the government of Chancellor Helmut Kohl, first as Minister for Special Affairs, one of five appointed in October 1990 to provide representation for the last East German government in the Kohl cabinet, then as Parliamentary State Secretary in the Ministry of Health for the remainder of Chancellor Kohl's time in office.

== Early life and education ==
She was born Sabine Schulz in Eisenach, Thuringia. After leaving school in 1964, Bergmann-Pohl was initially not admitted to university and entered a two-year internship at the Institute of Forensic Medicine at Humboldt University in East Berlin. In 1966, she began to study medicine and graduated in 1972 with a diploma in medicine. From 1979, she worked as a lung specialist and in 1980, earned a medical doctorate.

From 1980 to 1985, she was medical director of the polyclinic department for lung diseases and tuberculosis in Berlin-Friedrichshain. From 1985 to 1990, she was medical director at the District Office for lung diseases and tuberculosis in East Berlin.

In 1990, Bergmann-Pohl was made Patron of the General Disabled Persons in Germany (ABID eV). In 2003, she became President of the Berlin Red Cross and a member of the Presidium of the International Federation, where she has served as vice president since 2007.

== Political career ==
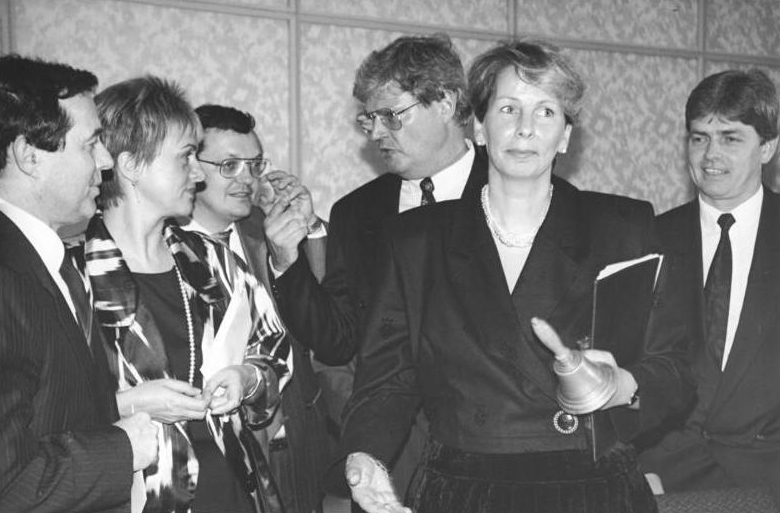
Meeting of the Volkskammer, 2 October 1990

In 1981, she joined the East German CDU, one of the bloc parties of the GDR, and in 1987 was elected to the district board in East Berlin.

In the general election of March 1990, the only free and fair election ever held in East Germany, she was elected to the People's Chamber, which on 5 April elected her its president. On the same day, parliament also abolished the State Council, the country's collective presidency. Under the Constitution, the president of the People's Chamber was ex officio vice president of the GDR; as such, Bergmann-Pohl assumed the role of interim head of state as well. In that role, she presided over the People's Chamber formally petitioning to join the Federal Republic of Germany on 23 August, as well as the overwhelming approval of the unification treaty on 12 September.

After German reunification on 3 October 1990, she became a member of the Bundestag and, along with other leading members of the last East German government, was also appointed Federal Minister for Special Affairs in Chancellor Helmut Kohl's cabinet.

After the 1990 all-German election, she was appointed Parliamentary Secretary in the Federal Ministry for Health on 18 January 1991. Following her party's defeat in the 1998 election, she departed from the government on 27 October 1998 but remained in the Bundestag until 2002.

== Personal life ==
Sabine Bergmann-Pohl was married to Ulrich Pohl from 1972 to 1979. They had two children. Since 1990 she is married to Jürgen Bergmann. She is a Protestant.

== Offices ==
Parliamentary mandates

- Member of the People's Chamber of the GDR (1990)
  - President of the People's Chamber (1990)
- Member of the German Bundestag (1990–2002)

Government Offices

- Federal Minister for Special Affairs (1990–1991)
- Parliamentary State Secretary in the Ministry of Health (1991–1998)

== Writings ==
- Frequency of a history and clinical findings of chronic obstructive pulmonary disease in childhood, their relationship to lung function and determination of reference values for the ventilation and distribution parameters on Pneumotestgerät. Results of a school investigation. Dissertation Academy for Medical Training of East Berlin, 1981, Berlin-Karow, 1976.
- Farewell without tears. Looking back at the year of the Unification. Recorded by Dietrich von Thadden. Ullstein, Berlin – Frankfurt/Main, 1991 ISBN 3-550-07802-1
- Sabine Bergmann-Pohl & Paul B. Wink (ed.): Panel Discussion 1953-1989: Germany on the way to unity and freedom on the occasion of the 50th Anniversary of the uprising in East Germany on 17 June 2003 at the Academy of the Konrad Adenauer Foundation in Berlin, Konrad-Adenauer-Stiftung, Berlin 2004 ISBN 3-937731-00-8
- Sabine Bergmann-Pohl & Wilhelm Staudacher (ed.): "The cry for freedom." The Hungarian Revolution of 1956, Konrad-Adenauer-Stiftung, Berlin 2007 ISBN 978-3-939826-46-0

Political offices
Preceded by Günther Maleuda	President of the People's Chamber; 1990	Succeeded by Rita Süssmuth as President of the Bundestag
Preceded by Manfred Gerlach as Chairman of the State Council of East Germany	Head of State of East Germany; 1990	Succeeded by Richard von Weizsäcker as President of United Germany
