= Ilse Thiele =

East German politician (1920–2010)

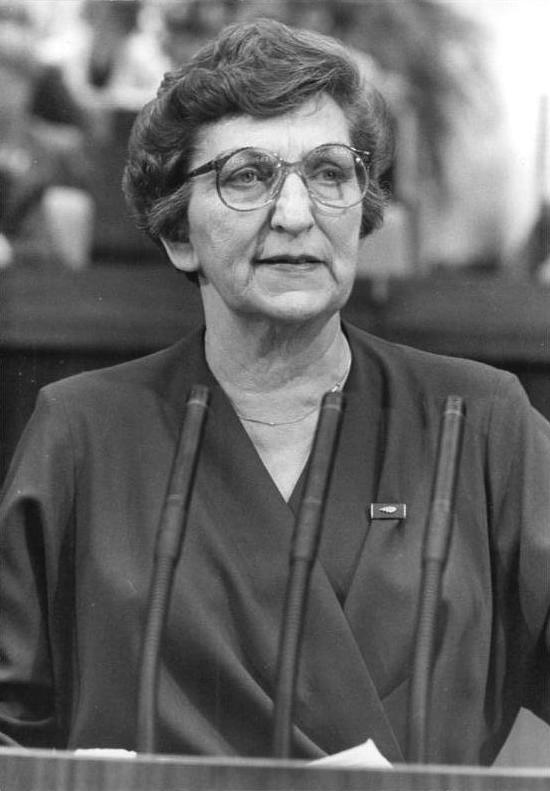
- Thiele in 1987

Chairwoman of the Democratic Women's League of Germany
- In office September 1953 – November 1989
- Preceded by: Elli Schmidt
- Succeeded by: Eva Rohmann

Member of the Volkskammer
- In office 1954 – March 1990

Member of the State Council
- In office 1971 – January 1990

Personal details
- Born: Ilse Neukrantz; 4 November 1920 Berlin, Germany
- Died: 10 January 2010 (aged 89) Berlin, Germany
- Party: KPD; SED
- Spouse: Heinz Thiele (1913–2002)
- Children: 3
- Occupation: Politician

Ilse Thiele (4 November 1920 – 10 January 2010) was an East German politician. She was a member of the powerful Central Committee of the country's ruling SED (party) between 1954 and 1989. She served as the chair of the national Democratic Women's League from 1953 to 1989.

== Life ==
=== Early years ===
Ilse Neukrantz was born in Berlin's central Lichtenberg quarter. Her father worked in a warehouse and later performed clerical work. Her mother was a milliner. Ilse and her brother Heinz Neukrantz attended junior and middle school locally. From 1937 till 1945, she worked as a court stenographer.

=== Politicised housewife ===
The war ended in May 1945 and with it came the end of Nazi Germany and of one-party government. Ilse Thiele, now a housewife in Wietze (near Celle), joined the Communist Party. By the next year, she had relocated to the Soviet occupation zone in what remained of Germany. Here, in April 1946, the contentious merger of the old Communist Party with the Moderate-left SPD paved the way for a return to one-party government, and Thiele was one of the thousands of Communist Party members who quickly took the opportunity to sign their membership over to the new Socialist Unity Party of Germany (SED / Sozialistische Einheitspartei Deutschlands).

Still working as a stenographer with various employers, in 1946, she joined the Trade Unions Federation (FDGP / Freier Deutscher Gewerkschaftsbund). Between 1948 and 1950 she served as a local councilor with responsibility for social affairs in Berlin-Lichtenberg. Between 1946 and 1952, she was also a member of the party leadership team in Lichtenberg. In 1950, she became the Berlin regional secretary for the Democratic Women's League (Demokratischer Frauenbund Deutschlands, DFD). In 1950/51, she also studied at the Karl Marx Party Academy.

=== Political establishment ===
In 1953, Ilse Thiele succeeded Elli Schmidt as national president of the Democratic Women's League, one of several quasi-political mass movements that were a feature of East Germany's Soviet based constitutional structure. Thiele would continue to head up the DFD till November 1989. The role was an important one: Thiele's long tenure contrasted with her predecessor's fall from grace, and may have reflected her own ferocious loyalty to the national leadership, especially during the politically contentious early 1950s.

=== At the heart of power ===
In April 1954, Thiele became one of the 91 members of the Party Central Committee. The constitutional structure of the German Democratic Republic insisted on the leading role of the party, and central committee membership placed her at the heart of decision making in a system which required government ministers merely to carry out the policy decisions of the party. Thiele remained a Central Committee member for two and a half decades, until the Central Committee itself resigned in November 1989 as part of the run-up to reunification.

"With great patience Comrade Walter Ulbricht teaches [us] how to find the way to the heart and to the mind of every woman.”
"Genosse Walter Ulbricht lehrt, mit großer Geduld den Weg zum Herzen und zum Verstand jeder Frau zu finden."

Ilse Thiele quoted in 1961

From 1954 through till March 1990, Ilse Thiele also sat as a member of the National legislature (Volkskammer). Despite her membership of the ruling SED (party), in the assembly, she instead represented the DFD. Between 1950 and 1986, the SED received more than 99% of the votes cast in every general election, but the DFD was one of a number of bloc parties and mass movements that nevertheless received a fixed quota of seats in the Volkskammer.

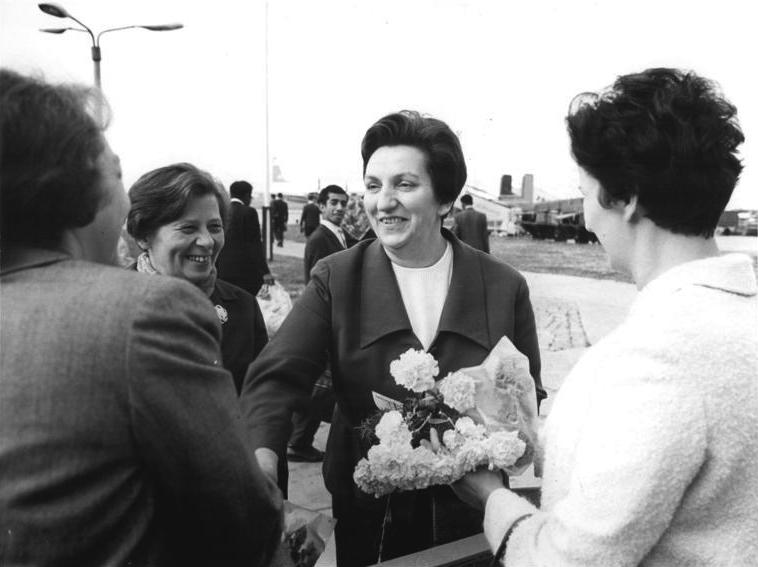
Ilse Thiele, President of the DFD and the GDR WIDF representative (Cairo airport, 1967)

In 1954, she became a member of the Presidium of the National Front, the organisational alliance of second tier political parties and mass movements used by the SED to manage and, where necessary, control various political and social elements. In 1971, she joined the national Council of State, remaining a member until January 1990.

From 1964 till 1989, she was a vice-president of the Women's International Democratic Federation, which, during the Cold War years, was widely seen as left-leaning and pro-Soviet.

=== Death ===
Ilse Thiele died in Berlin in early 2010, two months after her 89th birthday.

== Awards and honours ==
- 1957: Clara Zetkin Medal
- 1965: Patriotic Order of Merit in Gold
- 1985: Order of Karl Marx
