= Rudolf Kirchner =

East German politician (1919–1984)

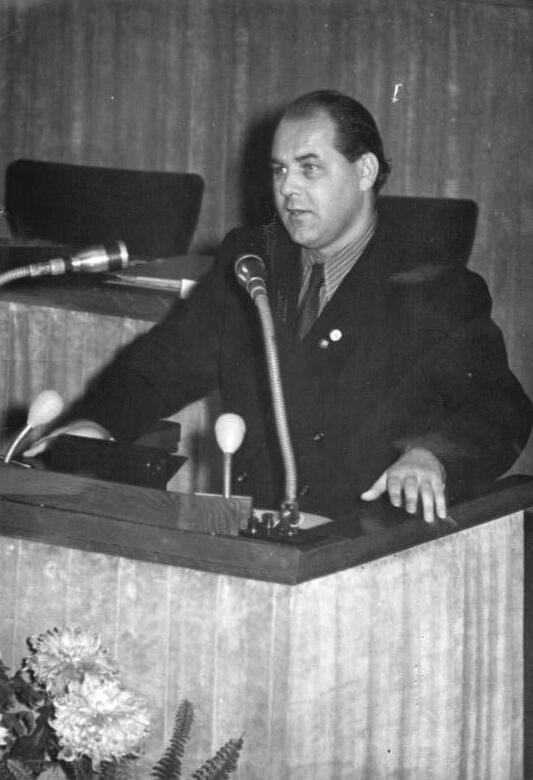
- Rudolf Kirchner in the Volkskammer in 1951

Member of the Free German Trade Union Confederation

Personal details
- Born: June 20, 1919 Hirschberg, Province of Lower Silesia, Germany
- Died: May 5, 1984 (aged 64) Berlin, German Democratic Republic
- Party: FDGB

Rudolf Kirchner (June 20, 1919, in Hirschberg, Province of Lower Silesia, Germany (now Jelenia Góra, Poland) - May 5, 1984, in Berlin, German Democratic Republic) was a trade union official in the GDR, representing the FDGB at various times as the parliamentary group leader in the Volkskammer and also serving as a candidate of the Central Committee of the SED.

== Early life and education ==
Rudolf Kirchner, the son of a blacksmith and train driver, completed his elementary education and pursued training as a typesetter from 1933 to 1937. Following his training, he initially worked in his chosen profession. Kirchner's life took a turn when he was conscripted into the Reich Labour Service for a few months between 1937 and 1938. Subsequently, in 1939, he received a conscription order for the Luftwaffe, serving until March 1945 when he became a prisoner of war in the Soviet Union. During captivity, Kirchner attended the Central Antifa-Schule in Krasnogorsk.

== Political career ==
Released by Soviet authorities in June 1949 into the Soviet Occupation Zone in Germany, Kirchner became a member of the SED and the FDGB. He was appointed as the department head for labor and social policy in the FDGB secretariat, concurrently joining the federal board of the FDGB. Kirchner's rapid ascent continued when he was elected deputy chairman at the 3rd Congress of the FDGB in 1950, alongside Alexander Starck, and became a candidate of the Central Committee of the SED at the 3rd Party Congress the same year.

Kirchner's active involvement in the FDGB continued as he stood for election as an FDGB deputy in the unified list vote during the Volkskammer elections in October 1950, securing a position as an FDGB deputy.The Second SED Party Conference in 1952 resulted in significant organizational changes for the FDGB, abolishing the position of deputy chairman and creating a presidium. Kirchner became a member of the presidium, leading the Department of Mass Production Work until the 4th Federal Congress in June 1955. He led the FDGB from 1953 to 1959 and in the 4th Volkskammer from 1963 to 1967, succeeding Herbert Warnke and Grete Groh-Kummerlöw, respectively. During his tenure as deputy FDGB chairman, Kirchner played a pivotal role in overseeing organizational matters and guiding individual unions. His responsibilities expanded after the removal of Alexander Starck in April 1951, making him the sole deputy chairman of the FDGB, overseeing cadre issues and the youth sector. His role as secretary of the federal executive continued, leading the office for German trade union unity until the 5th Congress of the FDGB in October 1959. Kirchner's contributions extended to managing the office for German trade union unity and temporarily overseeing the Department of International Relations.

In 1960, the SED sent Kirchner for a three-year study at the Higher Party School under the Central Committee of the Communist Party of the Soviet Union in Moscow, which he completed in 1963. Despite not being confirmed as a candidate of the SED at the 6th Party Congress in January 1963, he was re-elected to the presidium of the federal executive at the 6th Federal Congress of the FDGB in November of the same year. Kirchner continued his service, initially overseeing the Departments of FDGB Holiday Service and Labor Law until 1965. Subsequently, he resumed responsibility for inter-German work in the federal executive from 1965. At the 7th FDGB Federal Congress in May 1968, Rudolf Kirchner was not re-elected to the presidium of the FDGB federal executive. Subsequently, he found a position in the Ministry for Light Industry, later transitioning to the Ministry for Glass and Ceramic Industry. He served in the Volkskammer until 1971. In 1982, at the age of 63, Kirchner faced health challenges and was declared invalid.

== Honors ==
Kirchner's significant contributions to trade unions and his active role in shaping the FDGB's trajectory underscored his lasting impact on the labor movement in the GDR.

- 1965 Patriotic Order of Merit in Silver

== Writings ==
- The Activist Plan in the Struggle Against All Production Losses, Berlin 1951.
- The Activities of Trade Unions in the New Course, Berlin 1953.
- Peace Treaty and Trade Unions, Berlin 1959.
- Handbook for the Trade Union Official, Berlin 1965.
- Some Substantive Problems of the Activities of the FDGB for the Understanding of Trade Unions in Both German States, Berlin 1967.
