= Martha Israel =

German-Sorbian politician (1905-c. 1967

- Marta Israelowa
- Portrait by Dieter Dressler, 1965–1966

Member of the Volkskammer
- In office April 1963 – 1967

Personal details
- Born: 18 November 1905 Lohsa, Province of Silesia, Kingdom of Prussia, German Empire
- Died: after 1967 (aged at least 62)
- Party: Democratic Women's League; Socialist Unity Party
- Children: 1

Martha Israel (Upper Sorbian: Marta Israelowa; 18 November 1905 – after 1967) was a German clerk and politician of Sorbian ethnicity. She served in the Volkskammer of East Germany from 1963 until 1967 as a member of the Socialist Unity Party and the Democratic Women's League of Germany. Prior to this, she was also a member of the Spremberg city council, and was the secretary of the local branch of the Domowina.

== Biography ==
Martha Israel was born on 18 November 1905 in the town of Lohsa in Upper Lusatia, then part of the Prussian Province of Silesia in the German Empire. Her family were working-class Sorbs. After completing elementary school, she began working in various professions.

In 1947, Israel became involved with the Democratic Women's League of Germany (DFD), in East Germany. She joined the Socialist Unity Party (SED) in 1952, and was elected to the Spremberg city council the following year. She also attended the DFD federal school in Potsdam from 1953 to 1954, and the SED district school in Großräschen in 1961. From 1959 until 1962, Israel was a member of the SED district leadership in Bezirk Cottbus. By 1963, she was a clerk at the Gaskombinat Schwarze Pumpe, and was the secretary of the Domowina association in Kreis Spremberg.

Israel was appointed to the Volkskammer in April 1963 following the resignation of Max Müller, and joined the SED parliamentary group. She was re-elected in the 1963 East German general election as a member of the DFD. While in parliament, she served on the Committee on Labor and Social Policy. Israel left the Volkskammer the end of her term in 1967.

Israel was married with one child. She died sometime after 1967.

== Honors and awards ==
Israel was the recipient of the following honors and awards:

- Badge of Honor of the DFD
- Clara Zetkin Medal (1964)
- Medal for Excellent Achievements
- Medal of Merit of the GDR
- National Front Badge of Honor
