= Lieselott Herforth =

German politician and physicist

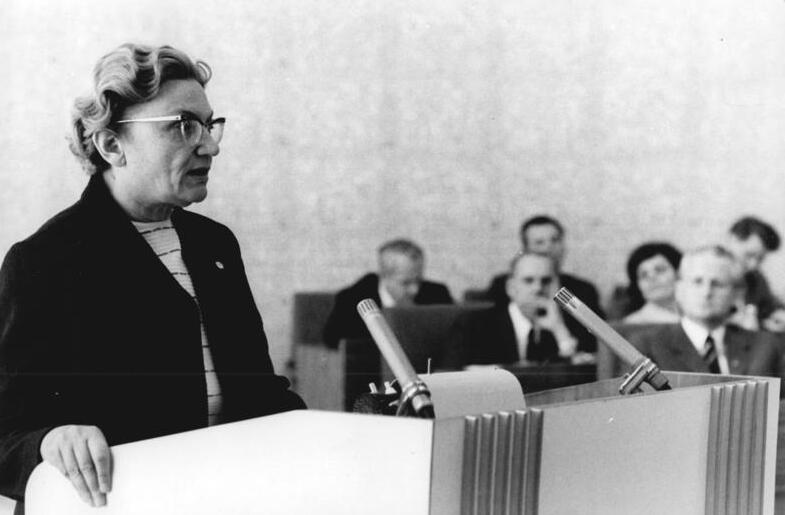
Liselott Herforth in 1970

Lieselott Herforth (13 September 1916 in Altenburg – 30 November 2010 in Dresden) was a German physicist and politician. She was a member of the State Council and the People's Chamber of the GDR and she was the first rector of a university in Germany.

== Life ==
Born in 1916, the daughter of a writer and publisher, Lieselott Herforth graduated from the Rückert-Oberlyzeum in Berlin-Schöneberg. Beginning in 1936, she studied physics and mathematics at Technische Universität Berlin and worked there as an assistant for physics and mathematics in 1938. She graduated with a diploma in 1940. She wrote her diploma thesis under supervision of Hans Geiger. In 1943, Herforth worked as an assistant at, among others, the Kaiser Wilhelm Institute for Physics in Berlin and at the University of Leipzig. In 1946, she was employed as a physicist in Oberspreewerk Berlin-Oberschöneweide. At the Kaiser Wilhelm Institute for Physical Chemistry and Electrochemistry in Berlin-Dahlem, she worked as a research assistant from 1947 to 1948 and received her doctorate under Hartmut Kallman at TU Berlin in 1948. In 1953, she habilitated on the basics of fluorescence application in medicine at the Karl Marx University Leipzig. She was thus the third woman in the GDR, and the seventh, who habilitated in Germany since the Weimar Republic in the traditionally male dominated subject physics.

After her habilitation, Herforth received a lecturer position for radiation physics at the University of Leipzig. From 1955 to 1960, Herforth was a research associate at the Institute for Applied Radioactivity in Leipzig. At the same time Herforth worked from 1957 to 1960 as a professor with a teaching assignment for applied radioactivity at the TU Leuna-Merseburg and followed in 1960 a call to TU Dresden, where she taught as a professor in the same field and from 1962 as a professor for the application of radioactive isotopes. She also became director of the Institute for the Application of Radioactive Isotopes at the Faculty of Mathematics. From 1965 to 1968 Herforth was the rector of the TU Dresden, making her the first rector at a university in Germany. From 1969 to 1977, Herforth taught as a full professor of experimental physics / radioactivity and dosimetry at the Physics Section of the TU Dresden.

== Political activities ==
From 1963 to 1981, Herforth was a member of the People's Chamber of the parliamentary group of the Freien Deutschen Gewerkschaftsbunds for four electoral periods. In the same period, she was also a member of the SED to the State Council of the GDR. In 1966, she became a member of the University Council of the Ministry of Higher Education.

== Memberships ==
Herforth was a member of the Chemical Society as well as the Biophysical Society of the GDR. In the 1955, Herforth was a member of the commission for junior and training issues in the Scientific Council for the peaceful application of nuclear energy that was founded by a resolution of the Council of Ministers of the GDR.

== Awards ==
Herforth was appointed full member of the German Academy of Sciences in 1969. In 1971, she was awarded the National Prize of the GDR for science and technology. In 1974, she received an honorary doctorate from the University of Chemical Industry, Veszprém, in Hungary. In 1977, she was awarded the Humboldt Medal in Gold. In 1982, the TU Dresden made Herforth an Honorary Senator. Herforth was awarded the Patriotic Order of Merit of the GDR in Silver (1964) and Gold (1981), the Banner of Labor (1966), and the Distinguished Service Medal of the National People's Army in Gold. She was honored twice as an activist and member of the "Kollektiv der sozialistischen Arbeit".

== Selected publications ==
- 1948: Die Fluoreszenzanregung organischer Substanzen mit Alphateilchen, schnellen Elektronen und Gammastrahlen (Diss.)
- 1958: Ultraschall: Grundlagen und Anwendungen in Physik, Technik, Biologie und Medizin
- 1964: Frauen in Technik und Naturwissenschaften (in: Das Hochschulwesen, 12/1964)
- 1968: Praktikum der angewandten Radioaktivität
- 1979: Neutronen-Personendosimetrie
- 1981: Praktikum der Radioaktivität und der Radiochemie
