= Otto Gotsche =

German politician (1904–1985)

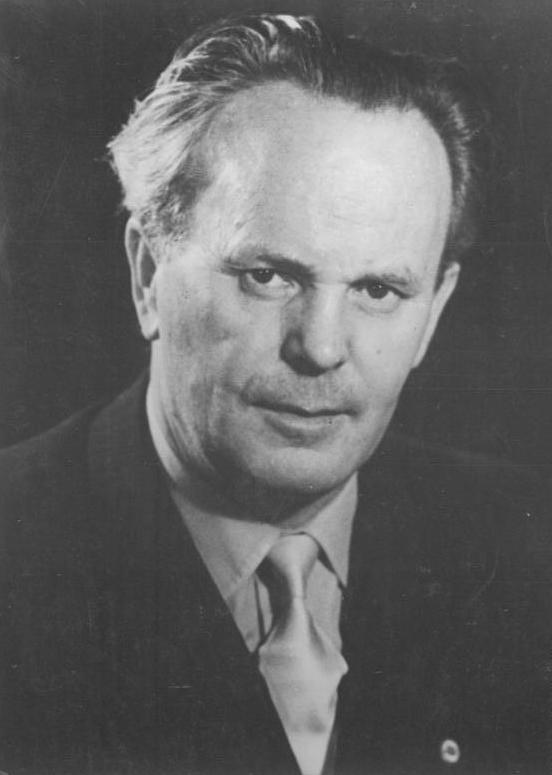
- Otto Gotsche, 1961
- Born: 3 July 1904; Eisleben, Province of Saxony, Prussia, German Empire
- Died: 17 December 1985 (aged 81); East Berlin, East Germany
- Occupations: Writer, politician
- Political party: KPD; SED

Otto Gotsche (3 July 1904 – 17 December 1985) was a German political activist (KPD) and writer. After 1945 he moved into mainstream politics.

During the Nazi years he worked effectively in the country's resistance movement. Having survived, he became a leading member of the East German literary establishment. A committed adherent to the country's political path during the 1950s and 1960s, he enjoyed the confidence of Walter Ulbricht, at times employed as an official spokesman for the leader. In 1966 he became a member of the country's powerful Party Central Committee. After Ulbricht lost power in 1971, the public profile of Otto Gotsche quickly faded, and he found himself retiring, one by one, from the various party offices he had acquired. He continued to be officially honoured for his work as a writer till the end, however.

== Life ==
=== Provenance and early years ===
Otto Gotsche was born in Wolferode, a quarter on the western side of Eisleben, a small town to the west of Leipzig which then, as now, was chiefly venerated as the birthplace of Martin Luther. Gotsche's father was a miner, and between 1918 and 1921 the boy trained as a metal worker. Aged just 15, he joined the newly launched Communist Party in 1919. By this time he had already co-founded, in 1918, the Mansfeld regional Free Socialist Youth movement and joined in the revolutionary turmoil that broke out across Germany in the aftermath of national military defeat. In 1920 he was working as a labour correspondent for the Communist press, also involving himself in opposition to the abortive Kapp Putsch.

=== Weimar democracy ===
In 1921 Gotsche was sentenced to a jail term because of his involvement in the so-called March Action. He received another jail term in 1923 when his functions as a Communist party official - which according to one source involved participation in an armed uprising in the Autumn of that year - landed him with a conviction for high treason. A period of unemployment followed his release from prison. Nevertheless, for most of the 1920s he was able to obtain employment, using his metal working knowledge, with factories in the Merseburg and Wasserkante areas, which he was able to combine with his work for the Communist Party and its youth wing. He undertook an extended working tour of northern Germany in 1924 and also found time to visit the Soviet Union in 1927.

=== Nazi dictatorship ===
Moving to the Hamburg area, in 1932/33 Gotsche served as a city councillor in Harburg-Wilhelmsburg, while continuing to pursue his work as a party official. The Nazis took power in January 1933 and lost little time in converting the German state into a one-party dictatorship. Political activity (unless in support of the Nazi party) became illegal. Gotsche was arrested in March 1933 and spent several months in Sonnenburg concentration camp. Following his release he was kept under close police surveillance.

After 1934 he continued to use his metal working skills on various building sites in the Halle-Merseburg area which enabled him unobtrusively to sustain connections with other communists. Between 1941 and 1945 he worked in the Lützkendorf fuel factory of Wintershall AG.

After 1939 Gotsche built up a resistance group, centred on the Geisel valley district. In 1942 the group merged with the similarly illegal Communist Party orgsanisation headed up by Robert Büchner in Eisleben, to form the Central German Antifascist Working Group (Antifaschistischiste Arbeitsgruppe Mitteldeutschlands / AAM) which they led, together with Kläre and Adolf Jahns-Taskiwski. Along with its connections in the Mansfeld region, the AAM had individual contacts in Halle, Zeitz, Querfurt, Weißenfels, Erfurt, Gotha and several towns in the Rhine-Ruhr region. In the closing years of the war it was one of the largest and best regional opposition groups in the entire country. It avoided close relationships on a group level with other Communist opposition groups, as a result of which it also successfully avoided being penetrated by Gestapo spies.

In March 1945, with foreign armies fighting their way towards Berlin and the end of the war in sight the AAM organised armed resistance groups, and at the start of April set up an illegal "citizens' committee" incorporating former Red Front and Reichsbanner members to form the leadership of a citizen militia. On 13 April 1945, shortly before the arrival of the US army, they disarmed the local police and took over the Eisleben town hall. When the Americans did arrive they installed Gotsche as district administrator (Landrat) for the two contiguous Mansfeld districts. However, before they departed they removed him again because of his "Communist activities".

=== Soviet occupation zone ===
Although central southern Germany was liberated from the Nazis by the US army, many of the postwar national frontiers of Europe had by that time already been agreed, albeit with varying levels of enthusiasm, by the leaders of the victorious nations. Most of the eastern part of Germany was passed to Poland and the eastern part of Poland was passed to the Soviet Union. What was left of Germany was to be divided into four allied occupation zones, and what had been the central portion of Germany was to be administered as the Soviet occupation zone. Respecting the agreement between President Roosevelt and General Secretary Stalin, in July 1945 the US army removed itself from the region and the Soviets moved in. Otto Gotsche was promptly installed as vice president of the regional administration to be based in Merseburg, with special responsibility for implementing land reform. Less than a year later, on 27 March 1946, Siegfried Berger, the president of the Merseberg regional administration died, and Gotsche replaced him.

Within the Soviet occupation zone the political landscape was transformed in April 1946 by the contentious merger that created a new political party, the Socialist Unity Party (Sozialistische Einheitspartei Deutschlands / SED). There was a widespread view that during the 1920s and 1930s it had been the political divisions of the German left that had left the way open for the emergence of the Nazi dictatorship in 1933. Signing party membership across to the SED from the old Communist party and the more moderately left-wing SPD was a simple matter involving a pre-printed form, and Otto Gotsche was one of the hundreds of thousands of former Communist Party members (and others) who lost no time in doing so. The party merger nevertheless had its opponents from among those who had never been Communists, and within the Merseberg district Otto Gotsch, as president of the regional administration, handled the situation with nimble-footed intransigence. In October 1946, confronting evidence that the "bourgeois parties" might be collaborating between themselves in opposition to the new order, he found himself able to announce that within the Merseberg region the SED had now become the largest individual party in every municipal and rural council in the region, and therefore the local mayors would all be men endorsed by the SED. Until 1952 the territory defined by the Soviet occupation zone was divided for administrative purposes into five federal states (" Länder"), following a pattern similar to that applied in the western occupation zones: in 1947 Otto Gotsche switched to a position as Ministerial Director with the Interior Ministry for the federal state of Saxony-Anhalt.

=== German Democratic Republic ===
Responding to the invitation of the party Politburo, in 1949 Gotsche relocated to Berlin. In October 1949 the Soviet occupation zone was relaunched as the German Democratic Republic (East Germany), a separated Soviet sponsored German state with its political and social institutions modeled on those of the Soviet Union itself. At this point the political philosophies and goals of the East German leadership were closely aligned with those of the Soviet leadership; and the most powerful member of the East German leadership was the Party General Secretary, Walter Ulbricht. During the next couple of decades Otto Gotsche, described on various occasions as "Ulbricht's Paladin", was a loyal supporter of the leader, with whom he worked closely, and on whose behalf undertook a succession of increasingly important tasks and roles. Between 1950 and 1960 he was employed as Ulbricht's official spokesman, also heading up, from 1949, the secretariat to the first deputy president of the Council of Ministers.

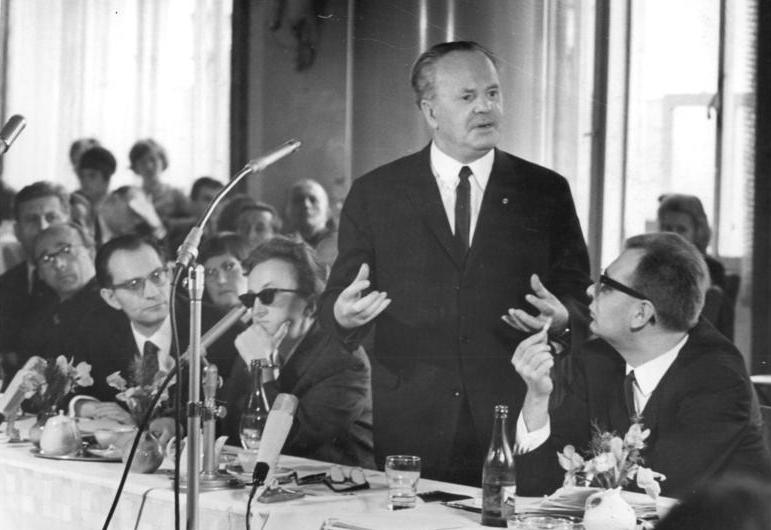
Gotsche giving a lecture about literature, 1966

In September 1960 old President Pieck, who was believed to have been in poor health for some years, died: the office of state president was now replaced by a collective head of state, known as the State Council ("Staatsrat"). Between 1960 and 1971 Otto Gotsche served this institution as its secretary, a position in which he reported directly to Walter Ulbricht, who was installed as the body's chairman. (Note: Staatsrat der DDR: kollektives Gremium, das 1960 als Nachfolgeorgan des Amtes des Präsidenten der DDR geschaffen wurde. Erster Staatsratsvorsitzender war Walter Ulbricht. Zum Sekretär des Staatsrates wurde Otto Gotsche bestimmt.)

Under the Leninist precepts of the East German Constitution, the leading role of the ruling SED in the national power structure was expressly stipulated, and except when a party conference was in session, power within the party resided with the Central Committee; although the stark nature of the power relationships between the government ministries, the National legislature ("Volkskammer"), the party central committee and other government institutions was in reality blurred to the extent that the same individuals frequently served in more than one of these institutions. In 1963 Otto Gotsche's name was placed on the candidate list for central committee membership, and in 1966, after a relatively short period of candidacy, he became one of the 121 Central Committee members. Although he would experience a major loss of power and influence after 1971, Gotsche would continue to be listed as a Central Committee member till he died at the end of 1985.

Between 1963 and 1971 Otto Gotsche also sat as a member of the National legislature ("Volkskammer"), where he was a member of the Presidium throughout his eight years in the chamber.

== The writer ==
According to one source Otto Gotsche's first published literary output appeared in 1928 in a communist newspaper, the "Hamburger Volkszeitung" ("Hamburg People's Newspaper"). However, by this stage he had already for several years been producing regular contributions to Communist newspapers.

His first novel, a semi-autobiographical work entitled "Märzstürme", was scheduled for publication early in 1933, but was suppressed by the Nazis. In the end it appeared, slightly expanded, in 1953 and became a favourite study text in East German schools. Another edition of it followed in 1971.

Possibly his most significant contribution to the canon of socialist literature was Die Fahne von Kriwoi Rog ("The Flag from Kriwoi Rog"). A film of the book appeared under the same title in 1967. Another book that gave rise to a movie version was "Unser kleiner Trompeter" ("Our Little Trumpeter"): the film appeared in 1964 under the title "Das Lied vom Trompeter" ("The Trumpeter's Song").

Reflecting the close links between literature and politics in East Germany, Otto Gotsche was also prominent as a representative of the Working Writer's Movement (Zirkel Schreibender Arbeiter).

== Awards and honours (not a complete list) ==
- 1958 National Prize of the German Democratic Republic
- 1959 Literature Prize of the German Democratic Republic
- 1964 Erich Weinert Medal
- 1965 Order of Karl Marx
- 1969 Patriotic Order of Merit
- 1979 Patriotic Order of Merit gold clasp
- 1984 Star of People's Friendship
