= Hans Rietz =

East German politician (1914–1996)

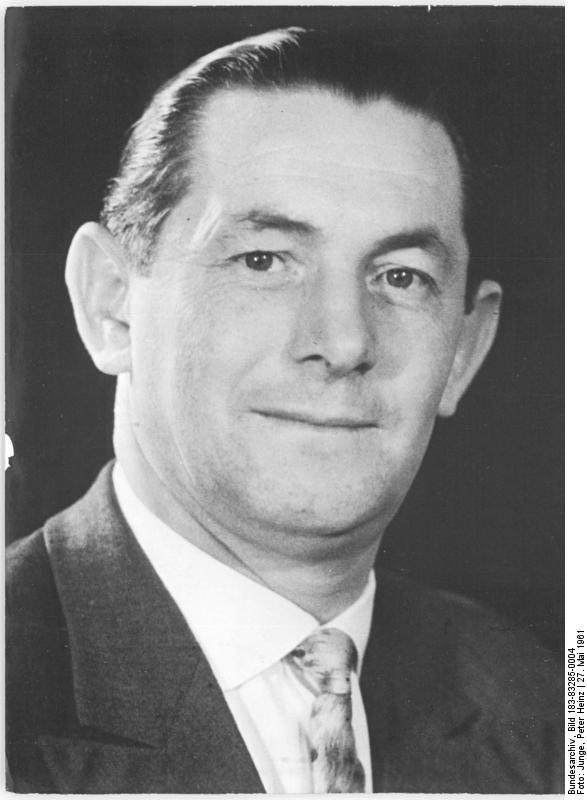
Hans Rietz Peter Heinz Junge, 1961

Hans Rietz (26 April 1914 – 25 May 1996) was an East German politician who became a top official in the country's Democratic Farmers' Party (" Demokratische Bauernpartei Deutschlands" / DBD), which was one of five so-called bloc parties controlled by the ruling Socialist Unity Party of Germany ("Sozialistische Einheitspartei Deutschlands" / SED). For many years Rietz served as a member of the National parliament ("Volkskammer") and he was also a long-standing deputy chairman of the State Council.

== Life ==
Hans Rietz was born to a working-class mother in Könnern, a small manufacturing town between Magdeburg and Halle. Little is known of his father, but in 1960 it was reported by Neues Deutschland, the mass-circulation newspaper of East Germany's ruling SED (party), that the father of Hans Dietz was a member of the Spartacus League and later of Germany's Communist Party which grew out of it.

He attended junior and middle school at nearby Bitterfeld, before undertaking an apprenticeship at Wolfen as a machinist between 1928 and 1932. From the start of his apprenticeship Rietz was a member of the Young Communists and of the Metal Workers' Union ("Deutscher Metallarbeiter-Verband" / DMV). On successful completion of the apprenticeship he remained with IG Farben, working as a machinist at their large Wolfen plant till 1939, apart from a two-year break for mandatory military service. (The term of military service had been extended from one year to two with effect from 24 August 1936.)

War returned in September 1939: Rietz was conscripted initially into the National Labour Service ("Reichsarbeitsdienst" / RAD) and later into the army. He was sent to fight on the Russian front and had reached the junior-officer rank of Oberwachtmeister by the time he was captured by the Soviets. In the prisoner of war camp he was politically active, undertaking various courses at the camp anti-fascist school. Rietz was returned to Germany in 1949. The central portion of what had previously been Germany was administered after 1945 as the Soviet occupation zone and there is speculation that his return was connected with a willingness to undertake a political role in the zone, which would be relaunched in October 1949 as the Soviet sponsored German Democratic Republic (East Germany).

He immediately joined the Free [East] German Trade Union Federation ("Freier Deutsche Gewerkschaftsbund" / FDGB) and the newly launched Democratic Farmers' Party ("Demokratische Bauernpartei Deutschlands" / DBD). Within the DBD he took a position as head of the party's national "Thomas Münzer" party academy at Borkheide (Belzig), and over the next three years successfully built up both the institution and his own credentials with the national leadership. He became a member of the DBD executive in 1951 and was thereafter engaged in a succession of leadership functions within the party. Between 1954 and 1982 he was a member of the presidium within the executive, becoming Party Secretary for Organisation in 1963 and serving as a deputy party president between 1963 and 1982. During several years in the mid-1950s and again between 1977 and 1982 he served as chair of the party court, a position he held in succession to Stephan Zagrodnik. Later he served as chair of the party's veterans' commission.

Following the so-called General Election of 1954 the DBD was allocated 52 of the 466 seats in the National Parliament ("Volkskammer"), and one of those seats went to Hans Rietz. He would remain a member of the assembly, even after retiring from his more onerous political functions, till 1986. From 1963 he was a deputy chair of the parliamentary defence committee. He represented the DBD as a member of the parliamentary presidium between 1976 and 1981.

By 1990 Hans Rietz had retired from active participation in East German politics. In March of that year East Germany held its first and, as matters turned out, last free and fair general election. The DBD achieved slightly above 2% of the national vote, implying a lack of popular support under a democratic system. According to some analyses the DBD's creation, back in the late 1940s, had been intended to weaken support for the "bourgeois parties", notably the CDU which back then had presented a serious challenge to the one party structure favoured by the authorities. In 1990, however, it was the CDU that staged an electoral come back, and after briefly attempting to carve out a niche championing ecological causes, the DBD merged into the CDU at around the same time the East Germany merged into what many saw as an expandeded version of West Germany. Hans Rietz, by now an "elder statesman" of the DBD, stood out in opposition to the party merger: between 1990 and his death in 1996 he was not a member of any political party.

== Awards and honours ==
- 1964 Patriotic Order of Merit
- 1974 Star of People's Friendship
- 1979 Patriotic Order of Merit, Honor clasp, in gold
