= Erich Grützner =

East German Trades unionist

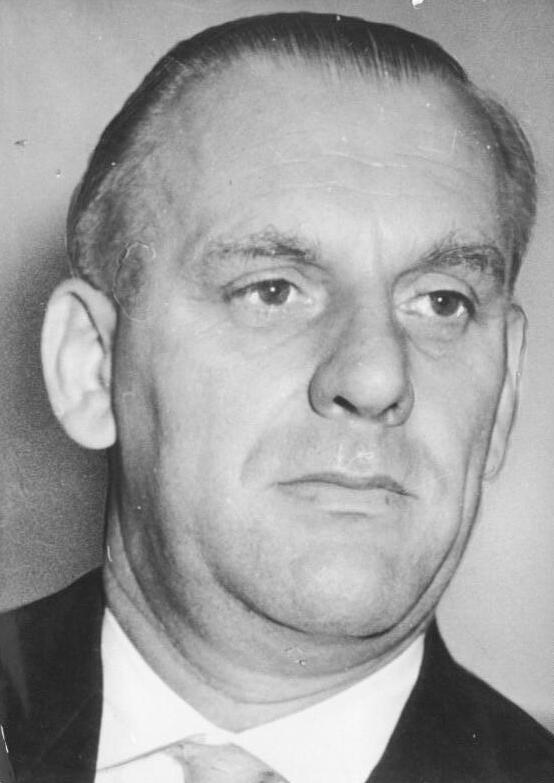
- Born: 30 July 1910; Pirna, Kingdom of Saxony, German Empire
- Died: 21 November 2001 (aged 91); Leipzig, Saxony, Germany
- Political party: SED

Erich Grützner (30 July 1910 in Pirna – 21 November 2001 in Leipzig) was an East German Trades unionist and a senior official in the country's ruling SED (party).

== Life ==
Grützner was born in so-called "Saxon Switzerland", a then prosperous mining region on the German frontier with Bohemia. His father was a steel smelter. He attended junior school in Copitz, a small town which since 1923 has been incorporated in the Pirna agglomeration. After leaving school, from 1925, without undertaking any apprenticeship or other formal training, he had a series of jobs. In 1924 he joined the youth wing of the Spartacus League, an extreme left wing political movement that had grown out of the pacifist socialism that blossomed during the war. In 1925 he joined the Young Communists and the German Metal Workers' Union, which marked his first recorded involvement with the Trades Union movement.

In 1932 Grützner joined the KPD (Communist Party). After the Nazi Party took power at the start of 1933 the Communist Party was banned, but Grützner continued to work for it, now illegally. Consequently, in 1934 he was arrested and sentenced to 16 months imprisonment for "Conspiracy to commit High Treason". On his release he appears to have remained in Germany, and between 1939 and 1945 he worked in Pirna in the Chemical Industry.

Directly after the war he became, till 1946, head of the Youth Committee for he municipality of Pirna. In 1947 he switched to the FDGB (Free German Trade Union Federation / Freier Deutscher Gewerkschaftsbund ), working for it as a full-time official in Pirna till 1949. During this period he also, in 1948, attended the party's training school in Ottendorf. Between 1948 and 1950 he was also a town councillor and Chairman of the Council in Pirna. In 1950 he was sent to the FDGB's "Fritz Heckert Academy" in Bernau bei Berlin, initially as a student and then, from 1954, as an instructor and department head.

Grützner was then sent to Leipzig where between February 1954 and March 1959 he was chairman of the regional FDGB board. In this position he was also, from July 1955 till October 1959, also a member of the national presidium of the FDGB. He was also a member of the ruling SED (party)'s Leipzig regional leadership, a position he retained till 1989. In 1954 Grützner was "elected" to the Leipzig City Council on which he continued to sit till 1981.

Between 1956 and 1963 he undertook a correspondence degree course with the party's Karl Marx Academy, which led to a university level degree in Social Sciences. In 1959 he became Council Chairman for the Leipzig district in succession to Karl Adolphs, retaining this position for fifteen years.

The period also covered a major building programme as part of the expansion of the Karl Marx University (as it was known at the time) in Leipzig. That building programme is chiefly remembered, more than four decades later, because it involved demolishing, in 1968, the iconic Pauliner Church. A painting of Erich Grützner that dates from this period can still be found on the first floor of the main building of the university. The painting, by the artist Werner Tübke (1929–2004), was the result of a competition undertaken on the uplifting theme "The working class and Intelligence are inseparably combined in Socialism under the Leadership of the Marxist-Leninist Party" Beside the image of Grützner, those of the regional party secretary of that time, Paul Fröhlich, and of the contemporary Lord Mayor of Leipzig, Walter Kresse, are also on display.

Grützner was also active in national politics, sitting in the People's Chamber (Volkskammer) as an SED member from 1958 till 1989. In 1967 he was called to be a member of the "Commission to develop a socialist constitution for the German Democratic Republic" under the leadership of Walter Ulbricht. As well as that, between 1958 and 1963, and again between 1976 and 1989, he was a member of the Budget and Finance Committee. Grützner came to be seen as a member of Ulbricht's inner circle, which meant that when, in 1971, national leadership passed from Walter Ulbricht to Erich Honecker, Erich Grützner's political career ground to a conclusion. From 1960 till 1976 he was a member of the State Council, and there he was a member of the "Strategic Work Group". In 1974 he was replaced as Chairman of the Leipzig City Council with Rolf Opitz. His last new job came in 1974 when he was appointed Chairman of the Leipzig Regional Committee of Anti-fascist resistance fighters of the German Democratic Republic.

Erich Grützner died in Leipzig in 2001.

== Awards ==
- 1955 Fritz Heckert Medal
- 1964 Banner of Labor
- 1970 Patriotic Order of Merit
- 1985 Order of Karl Marx
