= Anni Neumann =

East German politician (born 1926)

Anni Neumann (born 13 November 1926) is a retired East German politician who served between 1967 and 1971 as a member of the State Council of East Germany.

== Life ==
Neumann was born in Stettin, Prussia, in 1926. In her early life she was an agricultural worker. Starting in the 1950s she had a shipbuilding career at Neptun Werft in Rostock, and completed a diploma at the University of Rostock (WPU) in 1961. She ultimately became director of cadre and training at the shipyard in 1971 until retiring in 1981.

Neumann joined the Free German Trade Union Federation (FDGB) in 1946, the Free German Youth (FDJ) in 1947 and Socialist Unity Party of Germany (SED) in 1949. She held an FDJ leadership position for several years.

She was elected to the Volkskammer in 1954, and later (1976) became part of the parliament's constitutional and legal committee. In 1964 she became a member of the State Council, which was East Germany's collective head of state, until 1971.

Neumann was awarded the Medal of Merit of the GDR and the Patriotic Order of Merit in Bronze.
