= Klaus Sorgenicht =

German politician (1923–1999)

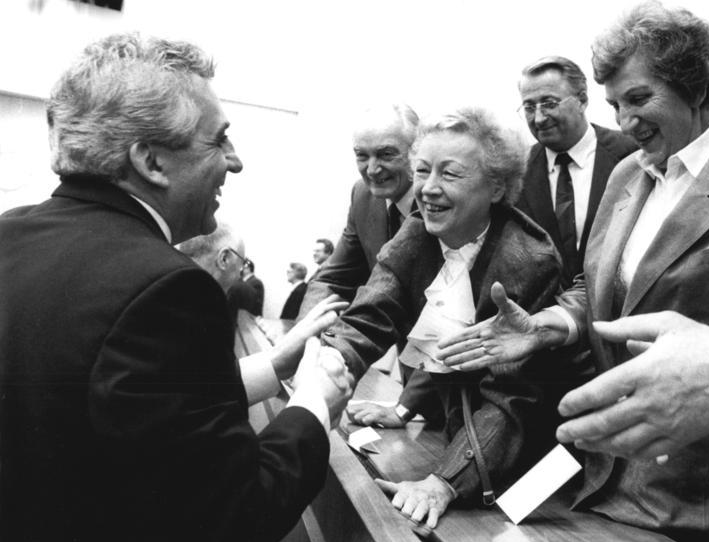
- Sorgenicht (center) in 1989

Head of the Department for State and Legal Affairs of the Central Committee
- In office November 1954 – 22 November 1989
- Secretary: Walter Ulbricht; Gerhard Grüneberg; Friedrich Ebert Jr.; Paul Verner; Egon Krenz; Wolfgang Herger
- Deputy: Waldemar Pilz; Günther Witteck; Günter Böhme
- Preceded by: Anton Plenikowski
- Succeeded by: Günter Böhme
Volkskammer
Member of the Volkskammer for Bützow, Güstrow, Lübz, Parchim
In office 3 December 1958 – 29 January 1990
Preceded by	multi-member district
Succeeded by	Constituency abolished

Personal details
- Born: Klaus Hugo Walter Sorgenicht; 24 August 1923 Elberfeld, Rhine Province, Free State of Prussia, Weimar Republic (now Wuppertal-Elberfeld, North Rhine-Westphalia, Germany)
- Died: 22 October 1999 (aged 76) Berlin, Germany
- Party: Socialist Unity Party (1946–1989)
- Other political affiliations: Communist Party of Germany (1945–1946)
- Education: CPSU Higher Party School; Akademie für Staats- und Rechtswissenschaft der DDR (Dr. rer. pol.)
- Occupation: Politician; Party Functionary; Civil Servant
- Awards: Banner of Labor; Patriotic Order of Merit, 1st class; Order of Karl Marx
- Other offices held: 1963–1990: Member, State Council; 1946–1949: District Administrator, Güstrow district; 1945–1946: Lord Mayor, Güstrow

Klaus Sorgenicht (24 August 1923 – 22 October 1999) was a German politician and party functionary of the Socialist Unity Party (SED).

Sorgenicht served as the longtime head of the powerful State and Legal Affairs Department at the Central Committee of the SED and was notorious for the ruthlessness with which he pursued opponents of the political system of the GDR.

== Life and career ==
=== Early life ===
Sorgenicht attended elementary school and commercial school in Hagen and Wuppertal and completed a commercial apprenticeship from 1938 to 1941. Until 1942 he was a commercial employee and department head at the company he had trained at in Wuppertal-Elberfeld.

Drafted into the Wehrmacht in 1942 and trained as a driver, he was deployed in the Soviet Union since January 1943. In July 1944, he deserted and became a prisoner of war in the Soviet Union. In captivity he joined the National Committee for a Free Germany and attended an Antifa school before being deployed as an agitator at the front.

=== East Germany ===
He returned to Germany in February 1945, moving with the Soviet troops. He became a member of the Communist Party of Germany (KPD) in July 1945 and was appointed deputy mayor of Güstrow under Hans Warnke on 6 May, rising to mayor two days later. After the local elections in 1946, Sorgenicht served as district administrator of the Güstrow district from October 1946 to the end of 1949. In 1965, he was made an honorary citizen of Güstrow.

In January 1950, probably at the instigation of Warnke, now Interior Minister of Mecklenburg he was appointed head of the state, district and municipal administration in the Interior Ministry of Mecklenburg. After Warnke moved to the federal GDR Interior Ministry as State Secretary, Sorgenicht also left the Mecklenburg Interior Ministry in October 1951 to work as a main department head in the GDR Interior Ministry. In October 1952 Sorgenicht was the head of the main department for the coordination and control office for the work of the local organs of state power.

=== SED Central Committee ===
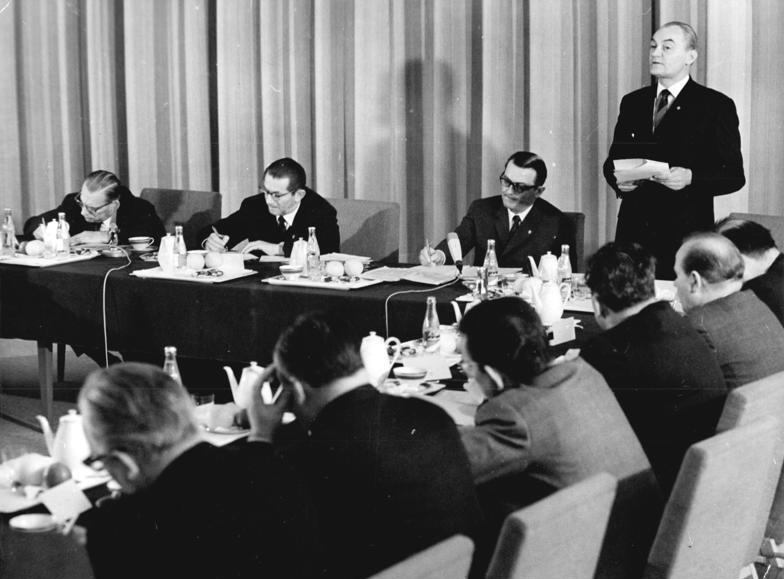
Sorgenicht speaking at a session of the State Council in February 1970

After completing a year of study at the CPSU Higher Party School, Sorgenicht became head of the State Administration Department in the fall of 1954 (reorganised as Department of State and Legal Issues in 1957) of the Central Committee of the SED, which he headed until his dismissal during the Peaceful Revolution in November 1989. Sorgenicht also joined the Volkskammer in 1958, nominally representing a constituency in northeastern Bezirk Schwerin, and the State Council, the GDR's collective head of state, in 1963.

This was one of the most influential departments of the Central Committee apparatus: not only was it responsible for Politburo decisions that concerned questions of the state, law, and the structure and functioning of state and judicial organs, and to control preparations and their implementation, it also headed its parallel departments in the Bezirk SED leaderships, significant parts of the Ministry of the Interior, the State Planning Commission, the Ministry of Justice, the Supreme Public Prosecutor's Office and the Supreme Court. Sorgenicht was thus significantly involved in all interventions in the judiciary and in the decisions of the Politburo that governed the judiciary.

He was responsible, in cooperation with the Stasi, for the systematic surveillance of judges and prosecutors. Together with Karl Polak, he initiated the fight against the remaining "revisionists" in the judiciary of the GDR in early 1958, namely those jurists who adhered to bourgeois or social democratic positions. This campaign culminated in the Babelsberg Conference in April of the same year. He never abandoned his mistrust of professional jurists, whose arguments differed drastically from the "ideologically crude statements of the bureaucrat Sorgenicht."

From 1955 to 1959, Sorgenicht completed a distance learning course at the Academy for Political Science and Law of the GDR in Potsdam, de facto a Marxist-Leninist cadre factory of the SED, which he graduated with a degree in political science. In 1968, he received a doctorate (Dr. rer. pol.).

Sorgenicht was awarded the Banner of Labor in 1965 and 1968, the Patriotic Order of Merit in 1973 and 1988, and the Order of Karl Marx in 1983.

=== Involvement in death sentences ===
In his capacity as department head, he was primarily responsible for the preparation and execution of trials against political opponents, including some show trials ("trials in extended public").

Prior to many trials in the 1950s and early 1960s, Klaus Sorgenicht proposed to the Politburo to impose death sentences. Once approved by the Politburo, Sorgenicht's proposals became binding for the courts, as in the trials against Gerhard Benkowitz, Heinz-Georg Ebeling and Paul Köppe, Sylvester Murau, Gottfried Strympe, Werner Flach, Karl Laurenz, and Elli Barczatis. After the death sentences were handed down against Karl Laurenz and Elli Barczatis, he recommended President Wilhelm Pieck to reject their pardon request.

In the RIAS trials, Sorgenicht proposed a life sentence for Joachim Wiebach. In this case, Ulbricht went beyond Sorgenicht's proposal and ordered the death penalty.

In December 1961, Sorgenicht proposed imposing the death penalty on a farmer who had resisted the forced completion of collectivization in the spring of 1960. The party held him and another farmer, who was also sentenced to death and executed, responsible for more than half of the farmers in their village who had declared their withdrawal from the Agricultural Production Cooperative in July 1961.

=== Peaceful Revolution ===
In early 1989, Sorgenicht was involved in preparing the electoral fraud in the local elections on 7 May 1989.

On 22 and 23 October 1989, together with Stasi head Erich Mielke, Security Affairs department head Wolfgang Herger, and Interior Minister Friedrich Dickel, he drafted a submission for the Politburo on "Measures to prevent further formation and to push back anti-socialist movements," one of the last attempts by the "old guard" within the SED to end the demonstrations for freedom "by all means." This submission is preserved in several drafts, the tone of which becomes increasingly harsh. However, the SED Politburo returned the submission to the authors for further revision.

Sorgenicht resigned from the Volkskammer and the moribund State Council in late January 1990.

=== Reunified Germany ===
In 1992, Sorgenicht was charged with judicial misconduct, manslaughter, and deprivation of liberty in several cases. Due to his inability to stand trial due to illness, he could no longer be held criminally accountable.

Sorgenicht died in 1999 at the age of 76 in Berlin.
