= Clara Zetkin Medal =

East German medal for women

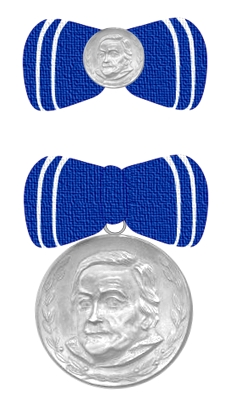
Clara Zetkin Medal (obverse)

The Clara Zetkin Medal was a national award in the German Democratic Republic.

It was created by the country's Council of Ministers on 18 February 1954 in order to honour the life and work of Clara Zetkin, whom the Marxist establishment regarded as one of the most significant female leaders in the history of the German people.

The medal was awarded for outstanding achievements in developing and advancing the country's socialist society. Those honoured were frequently professional women whose job performance had been exemplary while combined with maternal duties, reflecting the new role of women in modern socialist society. The medal was generally awarded only to one person on any one occasion, and the recipients were all women.

== See also ==
- List of awards honoring women
