= Horst Schumann (politician) =

German politician (1924–1993)

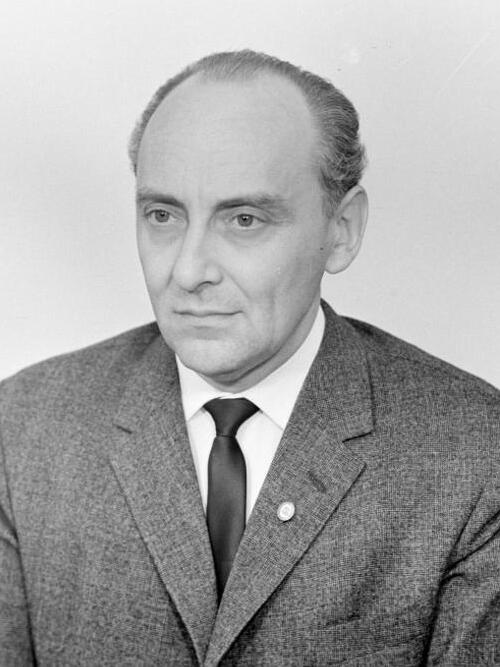
- Schumann in 1967

First Secretary of the Socialist Unity Party in Bezirk Leipzig
- In office 21 November 1970 – 5 November 1989
- Second Secretary: Jochen Hoffmann; Helmut Hackenberg
- Preceded by: Paul Fröhlich
- Succeeded by: Roland Wötzel

First Secretary of the Free German Youth
- In office May 1959 – May 1967
- Second Secretary: Günther Jahn
- Preceded by: Karl Namokel
- Succeeded by: Günther Jahn
Volkskammer
Member of the Volkskammer for Leipzig-Südwest, Leipzig-West, Leipzig-Nord, Leipzig-Nordost
In office 14 November 1963 – 16 November 1989
Preceded by	multi-member district
Succeeded by	Constituency abolished

Personal details
- Born: Horst Schumann; 6 February 1924 Berlin, Free State of Prussia, Weimar Republic (now Germany)
- Died: 28 December 1993 (aged 80) Berlin, Germany
- Resting place: Friedrichsfelde Central Cemetery
- Party: Socialist Unity Party (1946–1989)
- Other political affiliations: Communist Party of Germany (1945–1946)
- Parent: Georg Schumann (father)
- Education: Party Academy Karl Marx; CPSU Higher Party School
- Occupation: Politician; Party Functionary; Piano Maker
- Awards: Patriotic Order of Merit, 1st class; Order of Karl Marx; Hero of Labour
- Central institution membership: 1959–1989: Full member, Central Committee; 1958–1959: Candidate member, Central Committee; Other offices held: 1960–1971: Member, State Council; 1969–1970: Second Secretary, Socialist Unity Party in Bezirk Leipzig; 1953: First Secretary, Free German Youth in Bezirk Leipzig; 1950–1953: First Secretary, Free German Youth in Saxony; 1947–1948: First Secretary, Free German Youth in Leipzig

Horst Schumann (6 February 1924 – 28 December 1993) was a German politician and functionary of the Free German Youth (FDJ) and the Socialist Unity Party (SED).

In the German Democratic Republic, he served as the longtime First Secretary of the FDJ from 1959 to 1967 and of the SED in Bezirk Leipzig from 1970 to 1989.

== Life and career ==
Schumann's father, Georg Schumann, was a toolmaker, KPD (Communist Party of Germany) functionary, and resistance fighter against National Socialism. In 1933, his father was taken into protective custody by the Gestapo. Even before his father's release, Schumann joined the Hitler Youth in the spring of 1939, allegedly against his will and on the recommendation of Kurt Kresse, a friend of his father, who saw it as an opportunity to disguise the family.

Horst Schumann attended elementary school and learned the trade of piano making from 1938 to 1941. He participated in his father's resistance group, the Schumann-Engert-Kresse Group, with minor courier services. In 1943, he was conscripted into the Wehrmacht and served as an infantry and anti-tank soldier and grenadier. In the last months of the war, Schumann's father was executed for his activities in the resistance. After the war, Schumann was briefly interned in American and Soviet prisoner-of-war camps and, upon his release in July 1945, sought employment in Leipzig.

== Political career ==
=== Early career ===
After the liberation from National Socialism, Schumann joined the KPD in 1945 and chaired the anti-fascist youth committee in Leipzig. He became a member of the SED (Socialist Unity Party of Germany) in 1946 following the forced merger of the SPD (Social Democratic Party) and KPD.

He was one of the co-founders of the Free German Youth (FDJ) in Leipzig and served as the First Secretary of the FDJ there from 1947 to 1948. From 1949 to 1950, he was the secretary for Young Pioneers and Schools at the FDJ regional leadership in Saxony, and after attending the Party Academy Karl Marx, he served as the First Secretary of the FDJ regional leadership in Saxony and or later the FDJ leadership in Bezirk Leipzig after the states were dissolved in 1953. From 1953, he was a member of the Committee of Antifascist Resistance Fighters.

Despite superiors repeatedly praising his agitational skills and leading example, he was also criticized for his lack of assertiveness. Helmut Hartwig, Second Secretary of the Central Council of the FDJ, provided a particularly critical assessment, attributing to him superficiality, lack of perseverance, timidity, and insufficient understanding of people, which he attributed to the "indulgence by the comrades in Leipzig." Schumann's early political career was helped significantly by the association with his father.

In 1952, Schumann joined the Central Council of the FDJ. After working as a sector head for Youth and Sports in the Department for Leading Organs of the Central Committee of the SED for two years, Schumann pursued studies at the CPSU Higher Party School in Moscow, obtaining a diploma in Social Sciences in 1959.

=== FDJ First Secretary ===
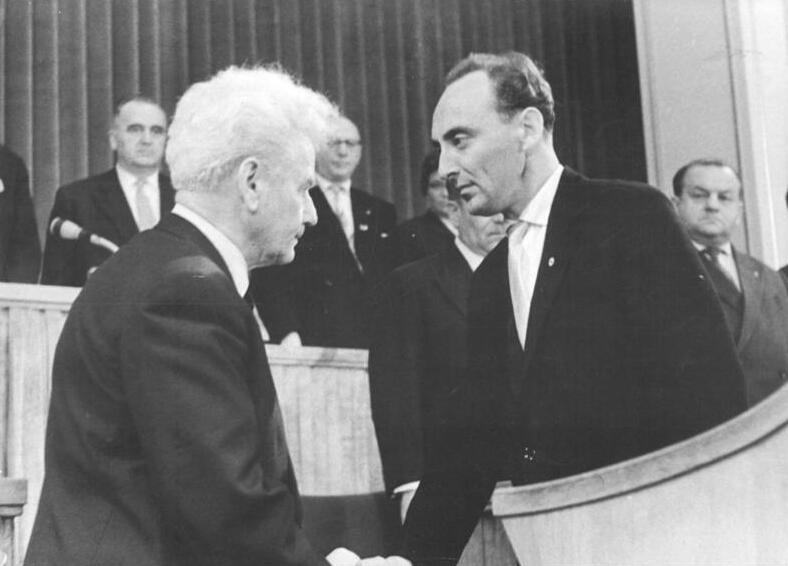
Schumann being congratulated by Hermann Matern on his election to the State Council in September 1960

In May 1959, Schumann rose to the position of the First Secretary of the Central Council of the FDJ, succeeding Karl Namokel, who was not reelected because he had shown little skill and experience in youth work.

Initially a candidate member since 1958 (V. Party Congress), he become a full member of the Central Committee of the SED in 1959, serving until its resignation in December 1989. He additionally became member of the Volkskammer in 1963 and the State Council, the GDR's collective head of state, in 1960, though he left it at the start of the Honecker era in 1971.

Schumann did not introduce his own accents in the FDJ, but he proved to be a loyal follower of Walter Ulbricht. However, Schumann found a rival in Erich Honecker, with whom he had already clashed during his FDJ tenure.

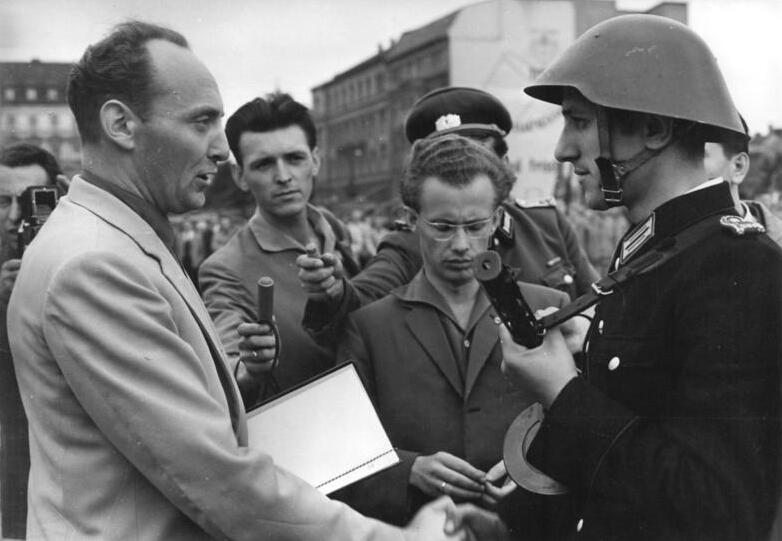
Schumann honouring Transportpolizei members for their contribution to the construction of the Berlin Wall

Around the time of the construction of the Berlin Wall, the Central Committee of the SED introduced a kind of socialist vigilantism, an extrajudicial self-justice, to nip politically inconvenient actions in the bud. Schumann supported this idea by formalizing the brutal attacks on 13 August 1961, in the form of a combat order:

"No discussion with provocateurs. They are to be beaten first and then handed over to state authorities. [...] Anyone who makes even the slightest derogatory remarks about the Soviet army, about the best friend of the German people, Comrade N. S. Khrushchev, or about the Chairman of the State Council, Comrade Walter Ulbricht, must in any case receive the appropriate punishment on the spot."

=== Bezirk Leipzig SED career ===
In 1967, Schumann had to retire from the FDJ due to his age, being succeeded by his deputy Günther Jahn. He subsequently joined the Bezirk Leipzig SED as Second Secretary in 1969, rising to the position of the First Secretary in November 1970 after longtime Paul Fröhlich surprisingly died.

However, his transfer to the Leipzig party apparatus was viewed with mixed feelings at the grassroots level. While Schumann was considered a pronounced "Ulbricht man," his predecessors' ability to represent the Bezirk Leipzig in the Politburo was not readily attributed to him due to his hesitant character. The change of power from Ulbricht to Honecker in May 1971 further worsened Schumann's position. Although he, like most of his colleagues, was not replaced, he found it increasingly difficult to make himself heard in Berlin. Schumann was summoned to the Central Committee less frequently, and the distance between Honecker and him was visible during state and party leadership tours.

Schumann had a leadership style that contrasted sharply with Fröhlich's authoritarian rule. On the local level, Schumann refrained from personal interventions in existing structures. He lacked support in the central party apparatus for such actions. Unlike Fröhlich, who as a member of the Politburo was always well-informed about the mood within the inner power circle of the SED, Schumann could no longer rely on such informational advantages. Schumann personally admonished local officials only in individual cases and endeavored to resolve problems in the Bezirk quickly and as discreetly as possible, strictly adhering to the official channels, if the conflicts extended beyond the Bezirk. He used party sanctions less as a means of punishment and more as a symbolic measure for internal party discipline.

The poor relationship with Honecker was further clouded by the declining economic significance of Bezirk Leipzig towards the end of the 1970s. Especially due to the accelerated development of microelectronics, chemistry, and metallurgy from 1977 onwards, the Bezirk Leipzig increasingly fell out of focus of state economic planning.

Schumann was awarded the Patriotic Order of Merit in 1964, 1974, and 1984 and the Order of Karl Marx in 1984.

=== Peaceful Revolution ===
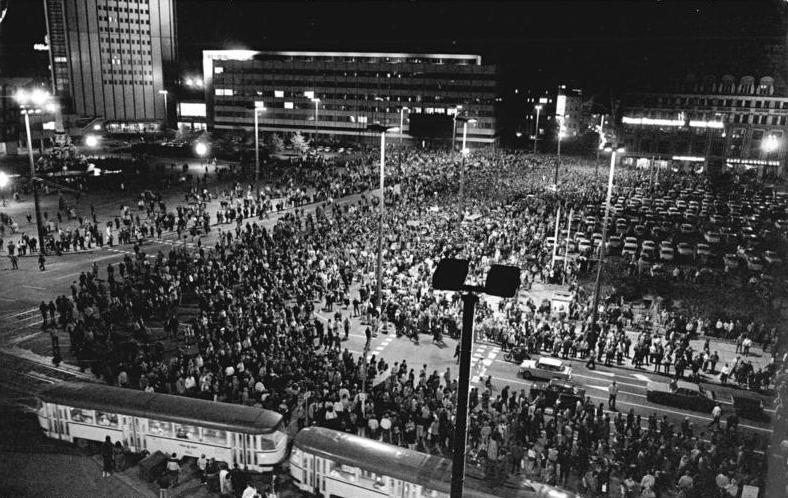
Leipzig Monday demonstration in October 1989

During the Peaceful Revolution in the GDR in 1989, he was viewed by Western observers as a moderate and tolerant top SED functionary. He was not involved in the decisions regarding the Leipzig Monday Demonstrations on 9 October 1989, as he was on sick leave. His deputy, Second Secretary Helmut Hackenberg, represented him.

On 20 October 1989, the Politburo, now under Egon Krenz, decided to replace Schumann with Bezirk Leipzig SED Science and Education Secretary Roland Wötzel, who was seen as reform-oriented and had participated in the call for non-violence during the large demonstration on 9 October 1989, in Leipzig, known as the "Leipzig Six." This also bypassed Helmut Hackenberg, who would have succeeded him if he was to officially retire for health reasons.

He was bid farewell by Krenz with the award of the Hero of Labour title at a meeting of the Bezirk Leipzig SED leadership.

=== Reunified Germany ===
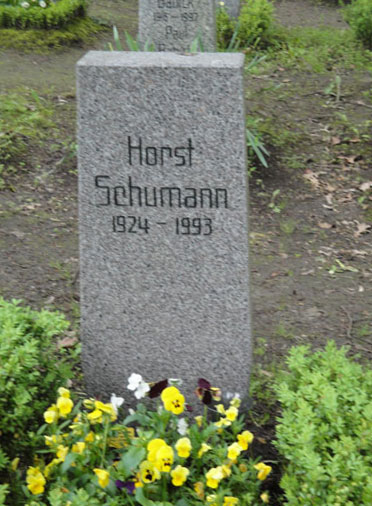
Schumann's grave in 2010

Following the political changes, on 5 May 1990, he was charged by the Leipzig District Attorney's Office with incitement to electoral fraud in the municipal elections in May 1989, but his death preempted any potential conviction.

Schumann died in 1993 at the age of 80 in Berlin.

His grave is located in the Friedrichsfelde Central Cemetery in the gravesite for victims of fascism and persecuted by the Nazi regime.
