= Bezirk Leipzig =

District of East Germany

District of Leipzig Bezirk Leipzig
- District (Bezirk) of East Germany
- 1952–1990
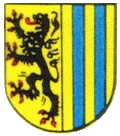
- Flag Coat of arms

- Location of Bezirk Leipzig within the German Democratic Republic
- Capital: Leipzig
- Area
  - 1989: 4,966 km^{2} (1,917 sq mi)
- Population
  - 1989: 1,360,900
- Government
- First Secretary of the Socialist Unity Party
  - 1952: Karl Schirdewan
  - 1953–1970†: Paul Fröhlich
  - 1970–1989: Horst Schumann
  - 1989–1990: Roland Wötzel
- Chairman of the Council of the Bezirk
  - 1952–1959: Karl Adolphs
  - 1959–1974: Erich Grützner
  - 1974–1989: Rolf Opitz
  - 1989–1990: Joachim Draber
  - 1990–1990: Rudolf Krause (as Regierungsbevollmächtigter)
- Legislature: Bezirkstag Leipzig
- History
  - Established: 1952
  - Disestablished: 1990
Preceded by
Saxony (1945–1952)
Thuringia
Saxony-Anhalt (1945–1952)
Succeeded by
Saxony
Thuringia
- Today part of: Germany

The Bezirk Leipzig was a district (Bezirk) of East Germany that would last from 1952 to 1990. Leipzig would be reabsorbed into Saxony after the reunification of Germany. The administrative seat and the main town was Leipzig.

== History ==
The district was established, with the other 13, on 25 July 1952, substituting the old German states. After 3 October 1990 it was disestablished following German reunification, becoming again part of the state of Saxony except kreise of Altenburg and Schmölln, became part of Thuringia.

== Geography ==
=== Position ===
The Bezirk Leipzig, correspondent to the area of the actual Direktionsbezirk Leipzig, bordered with the Bezirke of Halle, Cottbus, Dresden, Karl-Marx-Stadt and Gera.

=== Subdivision ===
The Bezirk was divided into 13 Kreise: 1 urban district (Stadtkreis) and 12 rural districts (Landkreise):

- Urban district : Leipzig.
- Rural districts : Altenburg; Borna; Delitzsch; Döbeln; Eilenburg; Geithain; Grimma; Leipzig-Land; Oschatz; Schmölln; Torgau; Wurzen.

== See also ==
- Direktionsbezirk Leipzig
- Administrative divisions of East Germany
- Bezirk Dresden
- Bezirk Karl-Marx-Stadt
