= Uwe Holmer =

German theologian (1929–2023)

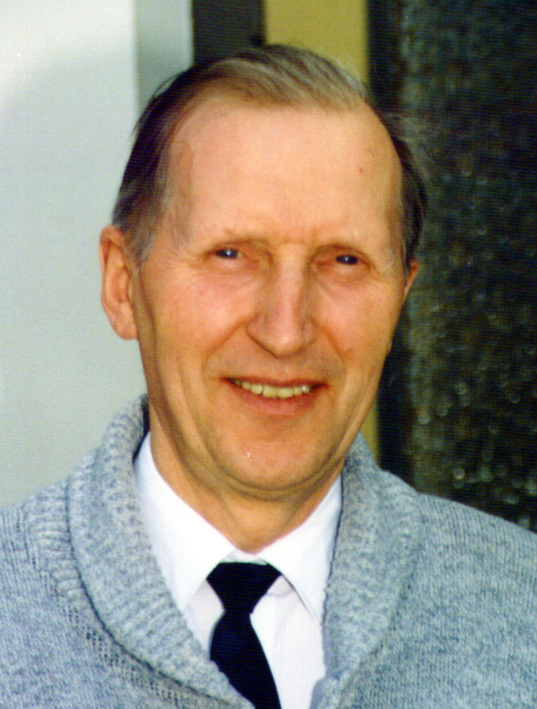
- Holmer in 2000
- Born: 6 February 1929; Wismar, Mecklenburg-Schwerin, Weimar Germany
- Died: 25 September 2023 (aged 94); Serrahn, Germany
- Occupations: Christian pastor, theologian, author
- Known for: Harbouring Erich and Margot Honecker
- Spouses: Sigrid (died 1995) Christine Lander (m. 1996)
- Children: 15

Uwe Holmer (German pronunciation: [ˈuːvə ˈhɔlmɐ]; 6 February 1929 – 25 September 2023) was a German pastor, author, and theologian. Holmer was the head of Bibelschule Falkenberg from 1967 to 1983 and Hoffnungstaler Stiftung Lobetal, a clinic for the homeless and disabled, from 1983 until his retirement in the 1990s. He was best known for taking in the former East German dictator Erich Honecker and his wife Margot after the Volkskammer seized Honecker's property.

== Early life ==
Holmer was born on 6 February 1929 in Wismar, Germany. He joined the Hitler Youth, seeing it as an opportunity to learn new things in an optimistic and comradely environment. As a teenager, Holmer suffered from health issues, sending him to a lung clinic for ten months, where he befriended an older boy who took care of him and told him about Jesus. This experience would shape his later ministry. After graduating secondary school in 1948, Holmer studied at the University of Jena to become a Lutheran minister. Even though Jena was located in Soviet East Germany, the university still offered theology classes taught by anti-Nazi Lutheran professors. Holmer was ordained and graduated in 1955, becoming a pastor in Leussow in the Ludwigslust district of Mecklenburg.

== Ministry ==
When his family escaped to West Germany in 1953, Holmer stayed in East Germany because he believed that it would need more pastors. He was a pastor in Mecklenburg from 1955 to 1967 and head of Bibelschule Falkenberg near Berlin from 1967 to 1983. Holmer criticized the GDR, opposing forced collectivisation of agriculture by the government. As a result, he became a target of the Stasi. Holmer's political stances prevented his family from visiting him for a year, and none of his children were allowed to attend secondary school, despite earning good grades. Holmer nearly appealed to the European Commission for Human Rights in response, but his bishop advised him to restrain from doing so, fearing that the state would close his Bible school. In 1983, Holmer became head of Hoffnungstaler Stiftung Lobetal, a sanatorium set up in 1905 to help addicts, seniors, disabled people, and homeless people. Under his leadership, the Hoffnungstaler Siftung opened an addiction clinic and gained many Pietist employees in the face of staffing shortages. For his work there, Holmer received a medal of merit from the GDR.

=== Sheltering Erich Honecker ===
Due to increasing instability in East Germany, Chairman of the State Council Erich Honecker was ousted from the Socialist Unity Party of Germany and deposed three weeks before the fall of the Berlin Wall. On 5 December 1989, the chief public prosecutor opened a formal investigation, causing Honecker to be placed under house arrest for one month. After being released, Honecker was forced to move from his house in Wandlitz, with the Volkskammer converting it into a sanatorium for the disabled. Although Honecker spent most of January 1990 in the hospital to remove a tumor, he lacked a home. Honecker instructed his close friend and lawyer Wolfgang Vogel to ask the Protestant Church of Berlin-Brandenburg for asylum, as other places risked exposure to mob violence. After Honeckers' request for housing was denied by the state four times, Bishop Gottfried Forck agreed to send Erich and Margot to Lobetal.

From the end of January to April 1990, Uwe Holmer and his wife Sigrid housed Honecker and his wife, Margot. During this time, Holmer's house was inundated by journalists and protesters. However, Holmer believed that harboring the Honeckers was morally right and saw it as an act of forgiveness. After Honecker moved out of Holmer's house, Holmer maintained correspondence with Honecker, with Erich and Margot Honecker sending Christmas cards to Holmer each year until Margot died in 2016. Ten years after Erich Honecker's death, Holmer campaigned to transfer his remains from an urn on Margot Honecker's windowsill in Chile to a grave in Friedrichsfelde, Germany.

== Later life and death ==
After Holmer's first wife, Sigrid, died in 1995, he married Christine Lander in 1996. Holmer adopted Christine's five children from her first marriage, as her husband died early. After he retired, Holmer moved back to Serrahn to work in a rehabilitation clinic for addicts. He also joined the board of the German Evangelical Alliance. Holmer denounced the practice of abortion, declaring that aborted fetuses are "missing from every corner of society". He also criticized the Evangelische Kirche in Deutschland for being guided by "extreme Bible criticism". Holmer regularly travelled to Kazakhstan and Kyrgyzstan to teach in Bible schools. In 2009, Holmer wrote an autobiography entitled Der Mann, bei dem Honecker wohnte. (Note: Translation: The Man with whom Honecker Lived) His story was also the subject of the 2022 documentary, Honecker und der Pastor, (Note: Translation: Honecker and the Pastor) directed by Jan-Josef Liefers. Holmer praised the film, saying, "The concern from back then is well captured in the film." Holmer died on 25 September 2023 in his home in Serrahn.

== Selected works ==
- Holmer, Uwe; de Boor, Werner (1976). Die Briefe des Petrus und der Brief des Judas (Wuppertaler Studienbibel) [The Letters of Peter and the Letter of Judas (Wuppertal Study Bible)] (in German). Wuppertal: R. Brockhaus Verlag. ISBN 3-417-25063-3.
- Holmer, Uwe; Hamm-Brücher, Hildegard; Hildebrandt, Regine (1993). Das geknickte Rohr aufrichten. Christen gegen Gewalt [Straightening the bent pipe. Christians against violence.] (in German). Wuppertal: R. Brockhaus Verlag. ISBN 3-417-24127-8.
- Holmer, Uwe (2009). Der Mann, bei dem Honecker wohnte [The Man with whom Honecker Lived] (in German). Holzgerlingen: Hänssler Verlag. ISBN 978-3-7751-4582-4.
- Holmer, Uwe (2021). Zuversicht. Weil Glaube trägt [Confidence. Because Faith Carries.] (in German). Dillenburg: Christliche Verlagsgesellschaft. ISBN 978-3-86353-730-2.
