= Paul Fröhlich =

German politician (1913–1970)

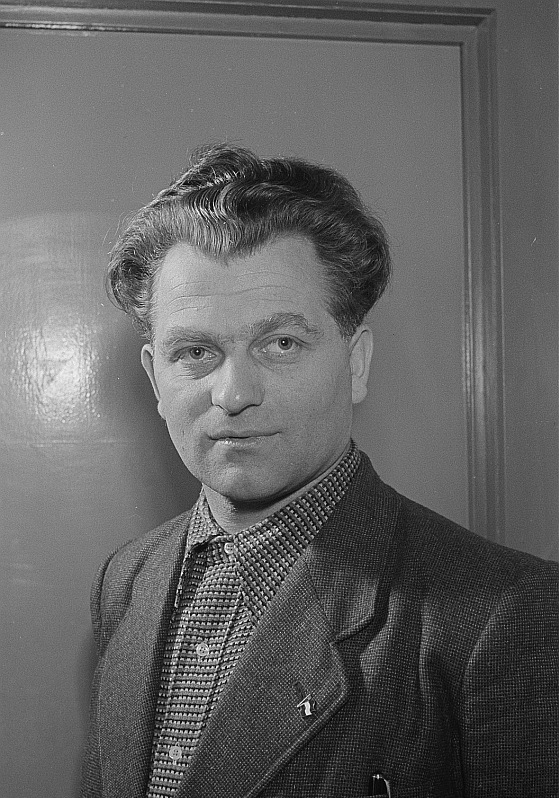
- Fröhlich in 1952

First Secretary of the Socialist Unity Party in Bezirk Leipzig
- In office January 1953 – 19 September 1970
- Second Secretary: Luise Bäuml; Otto Heckert; Hans Wetzel; Horst Schumann
- Preceded by: Karl Schirdewan
- Succeeded by: Horst Schumann
Volkskammer
Member of the Volkskammer for Leipzig - Stadtbezirk Südwest, Stadtbezirk West, Stadtbezirk Nord, Stadtbezirk Nordost
In office 19 November 1954 – 19 September 1970
Preceded by	multi-member district
Succeeded by	Klaus-Dietrich Sturm

Personal details
- Born: Paul Fröhlich; 21 March 1913 Niederplanitz, Kingdom of Saxony, German Empire (now Zwickau-Niederplanitz, Saxony, Germany)
- Died: 19 September 1970 (aged 57) East Berlin, East Germany
- Party: Socialist Unity Party (1946–1970)
- Other political affiliations: Communist Party of Germany (1930–1946)
- Education: "Karl Marx" Party Academy
- Occupation: Politician; Party Functionary; Cook
- Central institution membership: 1963–1970: Full member, Politburo of the Central Committee; 1958–1963: Candidate member, Politburo of the Central Committee; 1958–1970: Full member, Central Committee; 1954–1958: Candidate member, Central Committee; Other offices held: 1950–1952: First Secretary, Socialist Unity Party in Leipzig; 1949–1950: First Secretary, Socialist Unity Party in Bautzen

Paul Fröhlich (21 March 1913 – 19 September 1970) was a German politician and high-ranking party functionary of the Socialist Unity Party (SED).

In the German Democratic Republic, he served as the longtime First Secretary of the SED in Bezirk Leipzig and was a member of the Politburo of the Central Committee of the SED. Until his surprising death in September 1970, he ruled Bezirk Leipzig in a particularly authoritarian manner.

== Life and career ==
Fröhlich trained as a cook from 1929 to 1931 and worked as an industrial worker and miner.

In 1930, he joined the Communist Party of Germany (KPD). In 1933, he was arrested for illegal political activities and lived temporarily as a casual laborer. In 1939, he was drafted into military service as a field cook. In 1944, he deserted, was interned by the Swiss border police, and remained in American captivity until June 1945.

== Political career ==
=== Early career ===
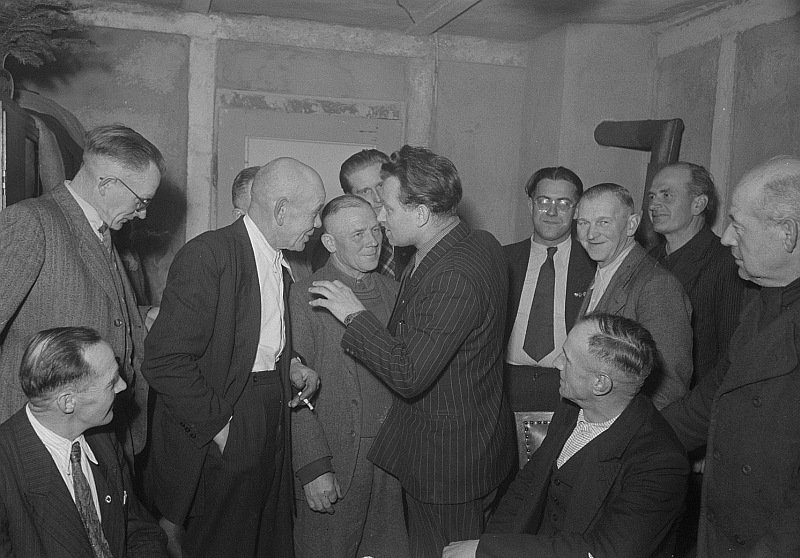
Fröhlich (right of center) in a discussion with a group of men in 1952

Fröhlich became a member of the SED (Socialist Unity Party of Germany) in 1946 following the forced merger of the SPD (Social Democratic Party) and KPD.

Until 1950, he served as Secretary and First Secretary of the KPD/SED district administrations in Glauchau, Dresden, Bautzen, and Leipzig. In all of these positions, he already became known as a Stalinist, adamantly purging former Social Democrats and Western emigrants. From 1950 to 1953, he pursued distance learning at the "Karl Marx" Party Academy.

=== Bezirk Leipzig SED career ===
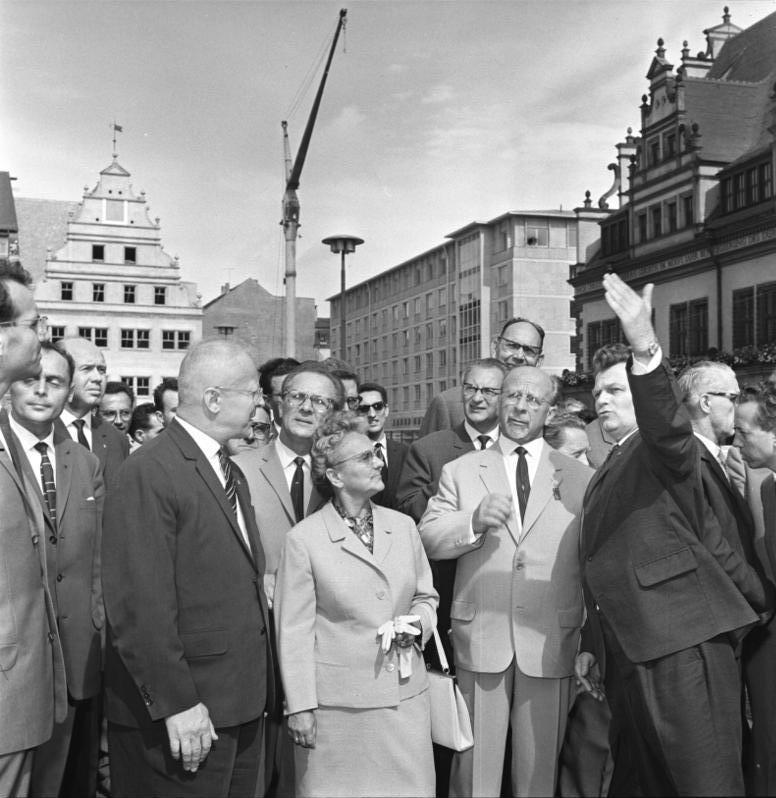
Fröhlich (right) and Walter Ulbricht (right of center) in Leipzig in September 1964

In 1952, he became the First Secretary of the Bezirk Leipzig SED, succeeding Karl Schirdewan, who joined the Politburo and Central Committee Secretariat as Secretary responsible for Party Organs, Woman and Youth.

Fröhlich practiced a particularly authoritarian leadership style in his secretariat and in the Bezirk administration. He suppressed any criticism of his decisions or his person with uncompromising severity and acted as a sole ruler, ruthlessly persecuting dissenters, even from within the party ranks.

On 17 June 1953, Fröhlich was on official duty in Berlin. He returned to Leipzig in the early afternoon, where he strongly criticized the previously hesitant police forces for their indecisiveness and ordered them to shoot the insurgents. Fröhlich's order to shoot resulted in the deaths of two people, and at least five more people became victims of Soviet troops after the imposition of a state of emergency (4 pm). Fröhlich's brutal use of armed force, even before martial law was declared, earned him the favor of Ulbricht, paving the way for his political ascent to the inner circle of the SED leadership after the suppression of the uprising.

Paul Fröhlich was responsible for the decision of the Central Committee of the SED to demolish St. Paul's University Church in Leipzig: No place of worship was to be tolerated at the socialist Karl Marx Square with the socialist Karl Marx University. Therefore, the University Senate and the Leipzig City Council also approved the demolition of the church, which took place on 30 May 1968.

His figure is depicted in the painting "Arbeiterklasse und Intelligenz" (Working Class and Intelligentsia) by Werner Tübke on the first floor of the main building of Leipzig University, the result of a competition with the theme "Working class and intelligence are inseparably linked under the leadership of the Marxist-Leninist party in socialism." Alongside him are the then chairman of the executive Council of Bezirk Leipzig, Erich Grützner, and the then Mayor of Leipzig, Walter Kresse.

Fröhlich was awarded the Patriotic Order of Merit in 1956 and 1969, the Medal for Fighters Against Fascism in 1958, the Banner of Labor in 1963, the Order of Karl Marx in 1965, and the Combat Order "For Merits to the People and Fatherland" in 1970.

=== SED Central Committee ===
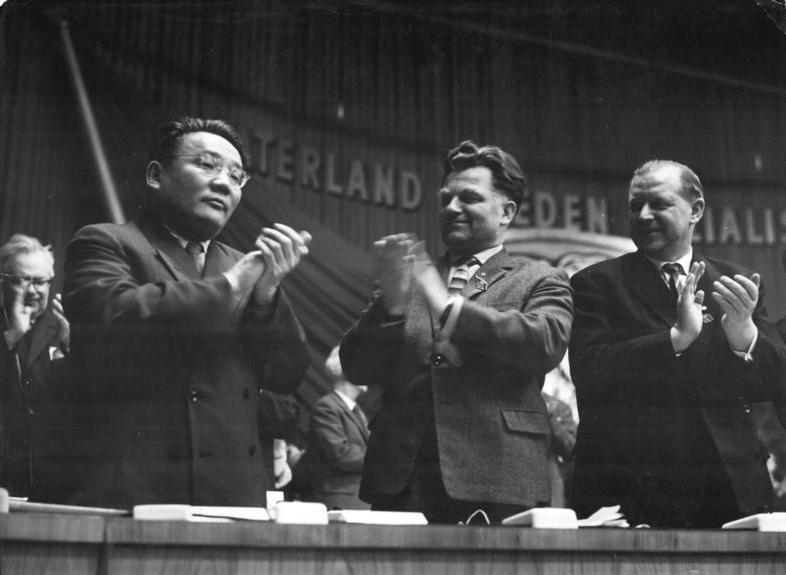
Fröhlich (center), SED Agriculture Secretary Gerhard Grüneberg (right) and General Secretary of the Mongolian People's Party Yumjaagiin Tsedenbal (left) at the VI. Party Congress of the SED in East Berlin in January 1963

Despite repeated warnings from Schirdewan, who had become cadre leader in the Central Committee, he was elected as a candidate member in 1954 and from 1958 (V. Party Congress) to his death, he was a full member of the Central Committee of the SED. Since 1958, he was a candidate member and since 1963 (VI. Party Congress) a full member of the Politburo of the Central Committee of the SED, the de facto highest leadership body in East Germany.

Fröhlich additionally joined the Volkskammer in 1954. Until 1958, he was a member of the Committee for Clemency, where he spoke up against philosopher and Karl Marx University lecturer Ernst Bloch, who was persecuted for criticising the repression of the Hungarian Revolution of 1956.

=== Death ===
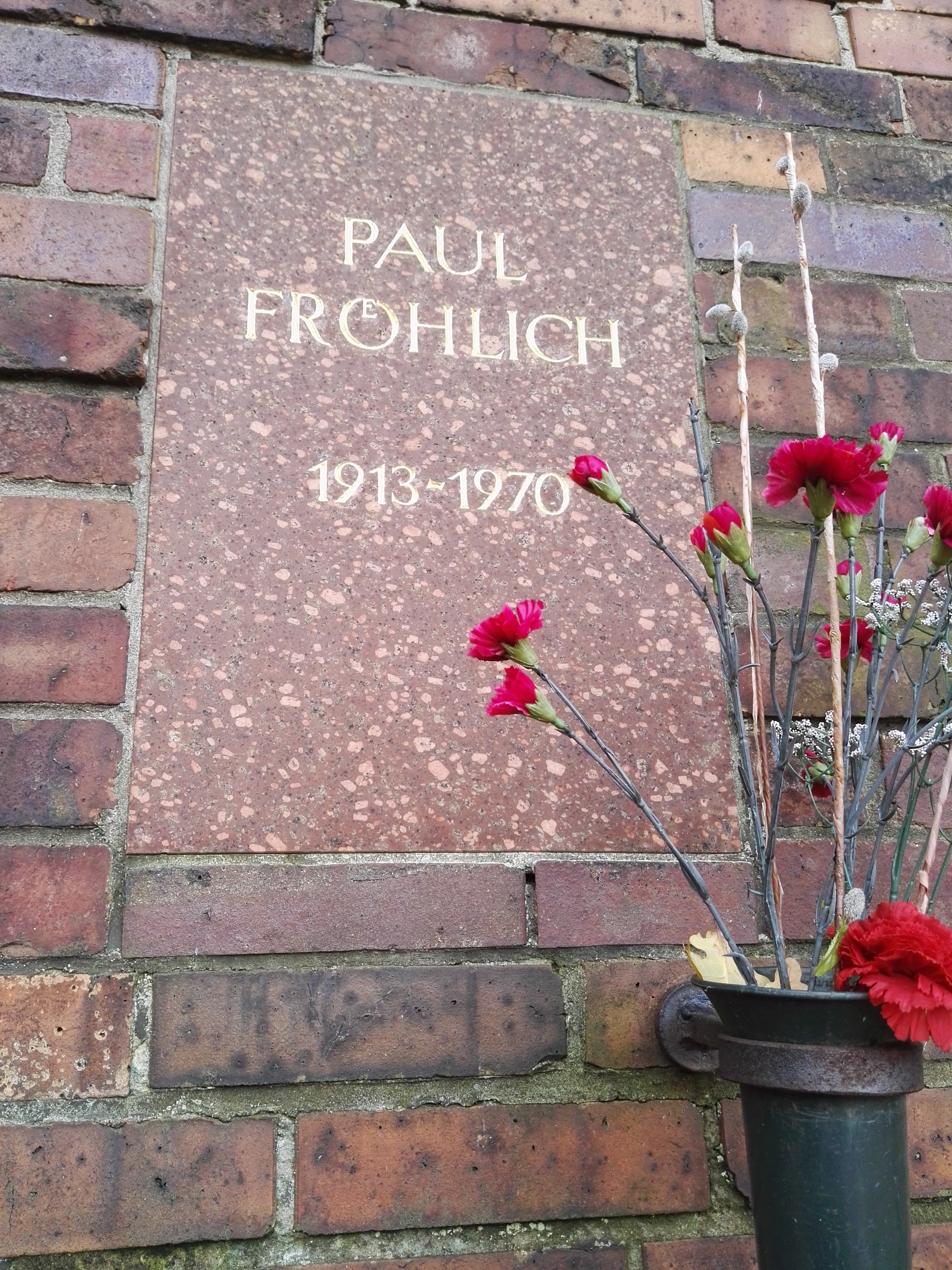
Fröhlich's grave in 2016

Fröhlich died of cancer at the age of 57.

His urn was interred in the Memorial of the Socialists at the Friedrichsfelde Central Cemetery in Berlin-Lichtenberg.

In the GDR, the National People's Army Training Center in Schneeberg (AZ-10) was named "Paul Fröhlich." From 1973 to 1990, the main facility of the TAKRAF combine operated under the name VEB Loading and Transport Systems Leipzig "Paul Fröhlich" (VTA).
