= Erich Honecker =

Leader of East Germany from 1971 to 1989

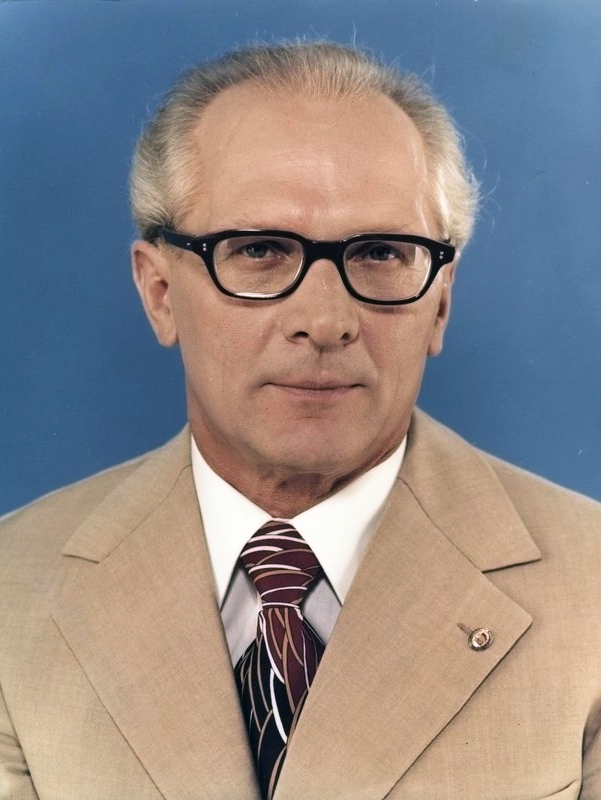
- Official portrait, 1976

General Secretary of the Socialist Unity Party (Note: Honecker held the same position under the title of First Secretary until 1976)
- In office 3 May 1971 – 18 October 1989
- Deputy: Paul Verner; Egon Krenz
- Preceded by: Walter Ulbricht
- Succeeded by: Egon Krenz

Chairman of the State Council
- In office 29 October 1976 – 24 October 1989
- Preceded by: Willi Stoph
- Succeeded by: Egon Krenz

Chairman of the National Defense Council
- In office 3 May 1971 – 18 October 1989
- Secretary: Fritz Streletz
- Preceded by: Walter Ulbricht
- Succeeded by: Egon Krenz

First Secretary of the Free German Youth
- In office 7 March 1946 – 27 May 1955
- Deputy: Edith Baumann; Gerhard Heidenreich; Helmut Hartwig; Heinz Lippmann; Werner Felfe
- Preceded by: Position established
- Succeeded by: Karl Namokel
Volkskammer
Member of the Volkskammer
In office 26 November 1971 – 16 November 1989
Preceded by	Paul Verner
Succeeded by	Monika Quinger
Constituency	Karl-Marx-Stadt/Stadt, №1
In office 8 November 1950 – 26 November 1971
Preceded by	Constituency established
Succeeded by	Wolfgang Rauchfuß
Constituency	Neuhaus a. R., Bad Salzungen, Meiningen, Hildburghausen, Sonneberg, №1

Central Committee Secretariat responsibilities
- 1988–1989: International Relations (de facto)
- 1961–1989: Cadre Affairs
- 1971–1989: Trafficking
- 1956–1983: Security Affairs
- 1971–1977: General Department
- 1958–1971: Party Organs
- 1958–1971: Youth
- 1958–1971: Women
- 1967–1971: Sports

Personal details
- Born: 25 August 1912 Neunkirchen, German Empire
- Died: 29 May 1994 (aged 81) Santiago, Chile
- Party: Communist (1930–1946); Socialist Unity (1946–1989); Communist (1990–1994)
- Spouses: Charlotte Schanuel, née Drost (m. 1946; died 1947); Edith Baumann (m. 1947; div. 1953) (Note: Various sources give the years of marriage as 1949 to 1953, 1950 to 1953 or 1949 to 1955); Margot Feist (m. 1953) (Note: Some sources give the year of marriage as 1955)
- Children: 2
- Occupation: Politician; Party functionary; Roofer; Farmer
- Central institution membership: 1958–1989: Full member, Politburo of the Central Committee; 1950–1958: Candidate member, Politburo of the Central Committee; 1946–1989: Full member, Central Committee (Note: Party Executive Committee until 1950); Other offices held: 1960–1989: Member, State Council; 1960–1989: Member, National Defence Council; 1956–1960: Member, Security Commission at the Politburo
- De facto leader of the GDR: ← Ulbricht; Krenz →

Erich Ernst Paul Honecker (German: [ˈeːʁɪç ˈhɔnɛkɐ]; 25 August 1912 – 29 May 1994) was a German communist politician who led the German Democratic Republic (East Germany) from 1971 until shortly before the fall of the Berlin Wall in November 1989. He held the posts of General Secretary of the Socialist Unity Party of Germany (SED) and Chairman of the National Defence Council; in 1976, he replaced Willi Stoph as Chairman of the State Council, the official head of state. As the leader of East Germany, Honecker was viewed as a dictator. During his leadership, the country had close ties to the Soviet Union, which maintained a large army in the country.

Honecker's political career began in the 1930s when he became an official of the Communist Party of Germany, a position for which he was imprisoned by the Nazis. Following World War II, he was freed by the Soviet army and relaunched his political activities, founding the SED's youth organisation, the Free German Youth, in 1946 and serving as the group's chairman until 1955. As the Security Secretary of the SED Central Committee, he was the prime organiser of the building of the Berlin Wall in 1961 and, in this function, bore administrative responsibility for the "order to fire" along the Wall and the larger inner German border.

In 1970, Honecker initiated a political power struggle that led, with support of Soviet leader Leonid Brezhnev, to him replacing Walter Ulbricht as General Secretary of the SED and chairman of the National Defence Council. Under his command, the country adopted a programme of "consumer socialism" and moved towards the international community by normalising relations with West Germany and also becoming a full member of the UN, in what is considered one of his greatest political successes. As Cold War tensions eased in the late 1980s with the advent of perestroika and glasnost—the liberal reforms introduced by Soviet leader Mikhail Gorbachev—Honecker refused all but cosmetic changes to the East German political system. He cited the consistent hardliner attitudes of Kim Il Sung, Fidel Castro and Nicolae Ceaușescu whose respective governments of North Korea, Cuba and Romania had been critical of reforms. Honecker's fragile health and growing dissent led the SED Politburo to dismiss him in October 1989 in a bid to improve the government's image in the eyes of the public; the effort was unsuccessful, and the regime would collapse entirely the following month.

Following German reunification in 1990, Honecker sought asylum in the Chilean embassy in Moscow, but was extradited back to Germany in 1992, after the fall of the Soviet Union, to stand trial for his role in the human rights abuses committed by the East German government. However, the proceedings were abandoned, as Honecker was suffering from terminal liver cancer. He was freed from custody to join his family in exile in Chile, where he died in May 1994.

== Childhood and youth ==
Honecker was born into a devout Protestant family in Neunkirchen, in what is now Saarland, to Wilhelm Honecker (1881–1969), a coal miner and political activist, and his wife Caroline Catharine Weidenhof (1883–1963). The couple, married in 1905, had six children. Erich, their fourth child, was born on 25 August 1912 during the period in which the family resided on Max-Braun-Straße, before later moving to Kuchenbergstraße 88 in the present-day Neunkirchen city district of Wiebelskirchen.

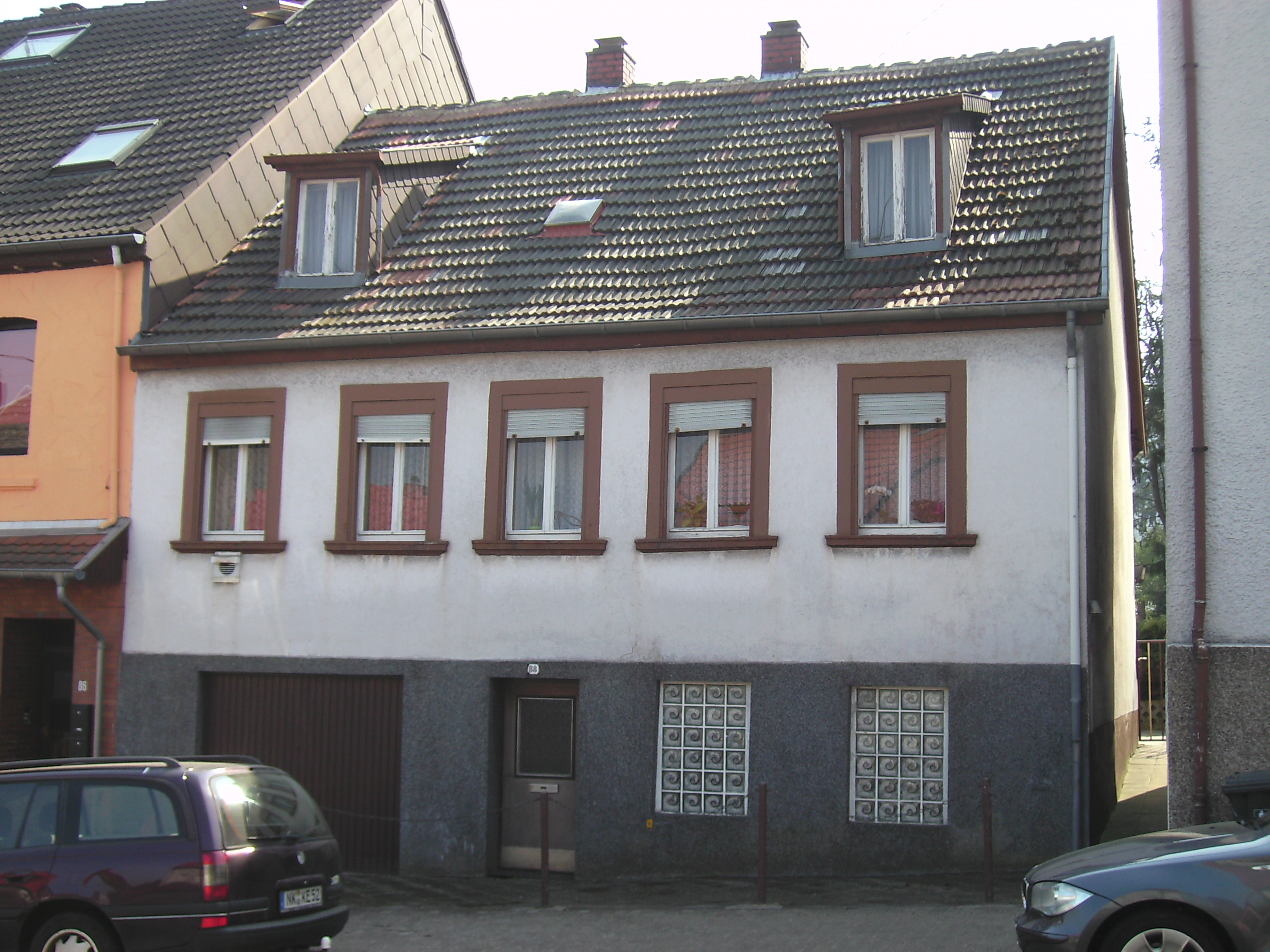
Honecker's childhood home in Wiebelskirchen

After World War I, the Territory of the Saar Basin was occupied by France. This change from the strict rule of Ferdinand Eduard von Stumm to French military occupation provided the backdrop for what Wilhelm Honecker understood as proletarian exploitation, and introduced young Erich to communism. After his tenth birthday in 1922, Erich Honecker became a member of the Spartacus League's children's group in Wiebelskirchen. Aged 14 he entered the KJVD, the Young Communist League of Germany, for whom he later served the organisation's leader of Saarland from 1931.

Honecker did not find an apprenticeship immediately after leaving school, but instead worked for a farmer in Pomerania for almost two years. In 1928 he returned to Wiebelskirchen and began a traineeship as a roofer with his uncle, but quit to attend the International Lenin School in Moscow and Magnitogorsk after the KJVD handpicked him for a course of study there. There, sharing a room with Anton Ackermann, he studied under the cover name "Fritz Malter".

== Opposition to the Nazis and imprisonment ==
In 1930, aged 18, Honecker entered the KPD, the Communist Party of Germany. His political mentor was Otto Niebergall, who later represented the KPD in the Reichstag. After returning from Moscow in 1931 following his studies at the International Lenin School, he became the leader of the KJVD in the Saar region. After the Nazi seizure of power in 1933, Communist activities within Germany were only possible undercover; the Saar region however still remained outside the German Reich under a League of Nations mandate. Honecker was arrested in Essen, Germany, but soon released. Following this, he fled to the Netherlands and from there oversaw KJVD's activities in Pfalz, Hesse and Baden-Württemberg.

Honecker returned to the Saar in 1934 and worked alongside Johannes Hoffmann on the campaign against the region's re-incorporation into Germany. A referendum on the area's future in January 1935 however saw 90.73% vote in favour of reunifying with Germany. Like 4,000 to 8,000 others, Honecker then fled the region, initially relocating to Paris.

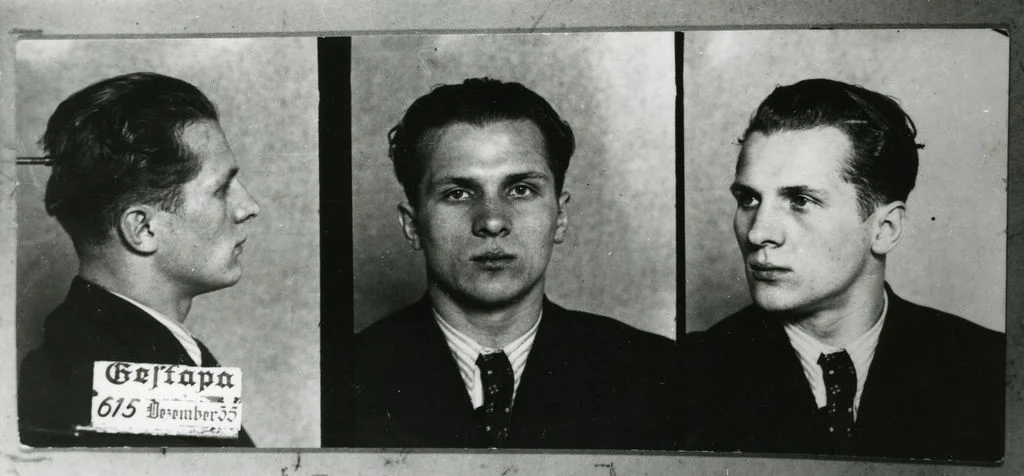
Mugshot of Honecker from his December 1935 arrest

On 28 August 1935 he illegally travelled to Berlin under the alias "Marten Tjaden", with a printing press in his luggage. From there he worked closely together with KPD official Herbert Wehner in opposition/resistance to the Nazi state. On 4 December 1935 Honecker was detained by the Gestapo and until 1937 remanded in Berlin's Moabit detention centre. On 3 July 1937 he was sentenced to ten years imprisonment for the "preparation of high treason alongside the severe falsification of documents".

Honecker spent the majority of his incarceration in the Brandenburg-Görden Prison, where he also carried out tasks as a handyman. In early 1945, he was moved to the Barnimstrasse women's prison in Berlin due to good behaviour and to be put to work repairing the bomb-damaged building, as he was a skilled roofer. During an Allied bombing raid on 6 March 1945, he managed to escape and hid himself at the apartment of Lotte Grund, a female prison guard. After several days she persuaded him to turn himself in, and his escape was then covered up by the guard.

After the liberation of the prisons by advancing Soviet troops on 27 April 1945, Honecker remained in Berlin. His "escape" from prison and his relationships during his captivity later led to his experiencing difficulties within the Socialist Unity Party, as well as straining his relations with his former inmates. In later interviews and in his personal memoirs, Honecker falsified many of the details of his life during this period. Material from the East German State Security Service has been used to allege that, to be released from prison, Honecker offered the Gestapo evidence incriminating fellow imprisoned Communists, claimed he had renounced communism "for good", and was willing to serve in the German army.

== Post-war return to politics ==
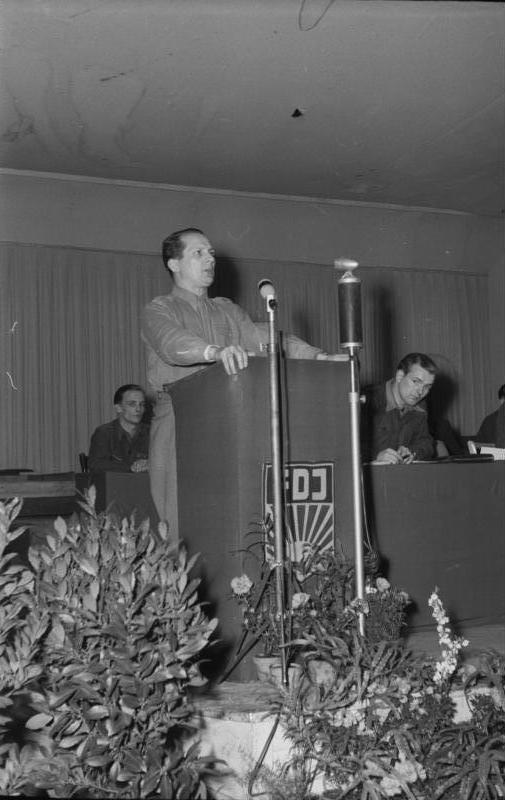
Honecker, founder of FDJ, 1946

In May 1945 Honecker was "picked up" by chance in Berlin by Hans Mahle and taken to the Ulbricht Group, a collective of exiled German communists that had returned from the Soviet Union to Germany after the end of the Nazi regime. Through Waldemar Schmidt, Honecker befriended Walter Ulbricht, who had not been aware of him at that point. Honecker's future role in the group was still undecided until well into the summer months, as he had yet to face a party process. This ended in a reprimand due to his "undisciplined conduct" in fleeing from prison at the start of the year, an action which was debated upon, potentially jeopardising the other (communist) inmates.

In 1946, Honecker became the co-founder of the Free German Youth (FDJ), whose chairmanship he also undertook. After the formation of the SED, the Socialist Unity Party, in April 1946 through a merger of the KPD and SPD, Honecker swiftly became a leading party member and took his place in the party's Central Committee.

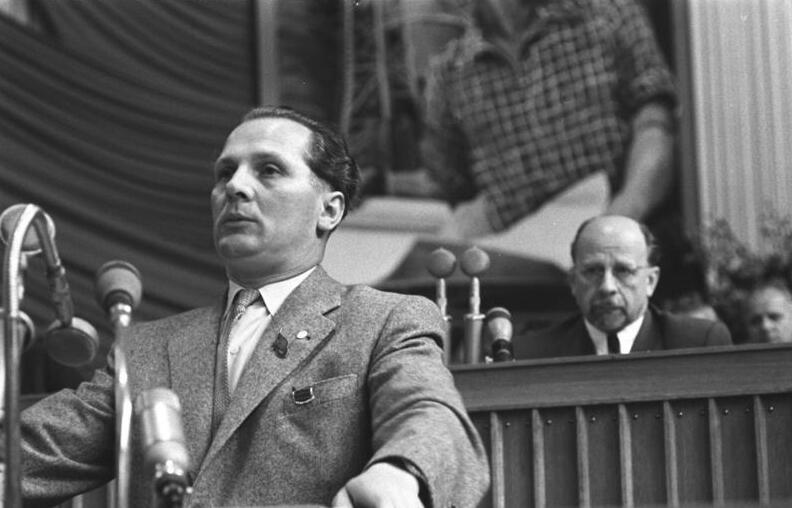
Honecker, watched by his mentor Walter Ulbricht at the Party's 5th congress, 1958

On 7 October 1949, the German Democratic Republic was formed with the adoption of a new constitution, establishing a political system similar to that of the Soviet Union. Within the state's socialist single party government, Honecker determinedly resumed his political career and the following year was named as a candidate member of the Politbüro of the SED's Central Committee. As President of the Free German Youth movement, he organised the inaugural "Deutschlandtreffen der Jugend" in East Berlin in May 1950 and the 3rd World Festival of Youth and Students in 1951, although the latter was beset with organisational problems.

During the internal party unrest following the suppressed uprising of June 1953, Honecker sided with First Secretary Walter Ulbricht, despite the majority of the Politburo attempting to depose Ulbricht in favour of Rudolf Herrnstadt. Honecker himself though faced questioning from party members about his inadequate qualifications for his position. On 27 May 1955 he handed the Presidency of the FDJ over to Karl Namokel, and departed for Moscow to study for two years at the School of the Soviet Communist Party at Ulbricht's request. During this period he witnessed the 20th Congress of the Soviet Communist Party in person, where its First Secretary Nikita Khrushchev denounced Joseph Stalin.

After returning to East Germany in 1958, Honecker became a fully-fledged member of the Politburo, taking over responsibility for military and security issues. As the Party Security Secretary he was the prime organiser of the building of the Berlin Wall in August 1961 and also a proponent of the "order to fire" along the Inner German border.

== Leadership of East Germany ==
While Ulbricht had replaced the state's command economy with, firstly the "New Economic System", then the Economic System of Socialism, as he sought to improve the country's failing economy, Honecker declared the main task under his New System of Economic Socialism to in fact be the "unity of economic and social politics", essentially through which living standards (with increased consumer goods) would be raised in exchange for political loyalty. Tensions had already led to his once-mentor Ulbricht removing Honecker from the position of Second Secretary in July 1970, only for the Soviet leadership to swiftly reinstate him. Honecker played up the thawing East-West German relationship as Ulbricht's strategy, to win the support of the Soviet leadership under Leonid Brezhnev. With this secured, Honecker was appointed First Secretary (from 1976 titled general secretary) of the Central Committee on 3 May 1971 after the Soviet leadership forced Ulbricht to step aside "for health reasons".

After also succeeding Ulbricht as Chairman of the National Defence Council in 1971, Honecker was eventually also elected Chairman of the State Council (a post equivalent to that of president) on 29 October 1976. With this, Honecker reached the height of power within East Germany. From there on, he, along with Economic Secretary Günter Mittag and Minister of State Security Erich Mielke, made all key government decisions. Until 1989 the "little strategic clique" composed of these three men was unchallenged as the top level of East Germany's ruling class. Honecker's closest colleague was Joachim Herrmann, the SED's Agitation and Propaganda Secretary. Alongside him, Honecker held daily meetings concerning the party's media representation in which the layout of the party's own newspaper Neues Deutschland, as well as the sequencing of news items in the national news bulletin Aktuelle Kamera, were determined.

Under Honecker's leadership, East Germany adopted a programme of "consumer socialism", which resulted in a marked improvement in living standards already the highest among the Eastern bloc countries – though still far behind West Germany. More attention was placed on the availability of consumer goods, and the construction of new housing was accelerated, with Honecker promising to "settle the housing problem as an issue of social relevance". His policies were initially marked by a liberalisation toward culture and art. While 1973 brought the World Festival of Youth and Students to East Berlin, soon dissident artists such as Wolf Biermann were expelled and the Ministry for State Security raised its efforts to suppress political resistance. Honecker remained committed to the expansion of the Inner German border and the "order to fire" policy along it. During his time in the office around 125 East German citizens were killed while trying to reach the West.

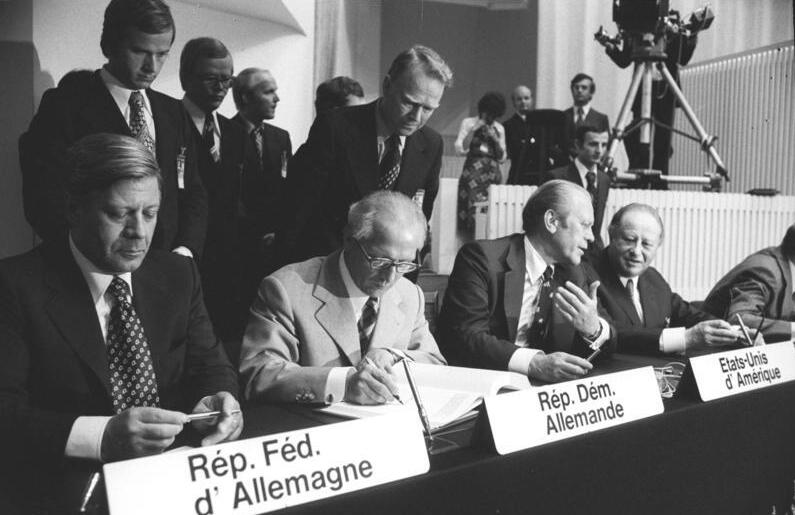
Honecker at the CSCE summit in Helsinki, 1975

After the Federal Republic had secured an agreement with the Soviet Union on cooperation and a policy of non-violence, it became possible to reach a similar agreement with the GDR. The Basic Treaty between East and West Germany in 1972 sought to normalise contacts between the two governments.

East Germany also participated in the Conference on Security and Co-operation in Europe held in Helsinki in 1975, which attempted to improve relations between the West and the Eastern Bloc, and became a full member of the United Nations. These acts of diplomacy were considered Honecker's greatest successes in foreign politics.

Honecker received additional high-profile personal recognitions including honorary doctorates of business administration from East Berlin's Humboldt University in 1976, Tokyo's Nihon University in 1981 and the London School of Economics in 1984 and the Olympic Order from the IOC in 1985. In September 1987, he became the first East German head of state to visit West Germany, where he was received with full state honours by West German Chancellor Helmut Kohl in an act that seemed to confirm West Germany's acceptance of East Germany's existence. During this trip he also journeyed to his birthplace in Saarland, where he held an emotional speech in which he spoke of a day when Germans would no longer be separated by borders. This trip had been planned twice before, including September 1984, but was initially blocked by the Soviet leadership which mistrusted the special East-West German relationship, particularly efforts to expand East Germany's limited independence in the realm of foreign policy.

== Illness, downfall and resignation ==
In the late 1980s, Soviet leader Mikhail Gorbachev introduced glasnost and perestroika, reforms to liberalise the socialist planned economy. Frictions between him and Honecker had grown over these policies and numerous additional issues from 1985 onward. East Germany refused to implement similar reforms, with Honecker reportedly telling Gorbachev: "We have done our perestroika; we have nothing to restructure". Gorbachev grew to dislike Honecker, and by 1988 was lumping him in with Bulgaria's Todor Zhivkov, Czechoslovakia's Gustáv Husák and Romania's Nicolae Ceaușescu as a "Gang of Four": a group of inflexible hardliners unwilling to make reforms.

According to White House experts Philip Zelikow and Condoleezza Rice, Gorbachev looked to Communist leaders in Eastern Europe to follow his example of perestroika and glasnost. They argue:

Gorbachev himself had no particular sympathy for Erich Honecker, chairman of the East German Communist Party, and his hard-line comrades and the government. As early as 1985... [Gorbachev] had told East German party officials that kindergarten was over; no one would lead them by the hand. They were responsible for their own people. The relations between Gorbachev and Honecker went downhill from there.

Western analysts, according to Zelikow and Rice, believed in 1989 that Communism was still secure in East Germany:

Bolstered by relatively greater affluence than his country's Eastern European neighbours enjoyed in a fantastically elaborate system of internal controls, East Germany's longtime leader Eric Honecker seemed secure in his position. His government had long dealt with dissent through a mixture of brutal repression, forced emigration, and the vent of allowing occasional, limited travel to the West for a substantial part of the population.

Honecker felt betrayed by Gorbachev in his German policy and ensured that official texts of the Soviet Union, especially those concerning perestroika, could no longer be published or sold in East Germany.

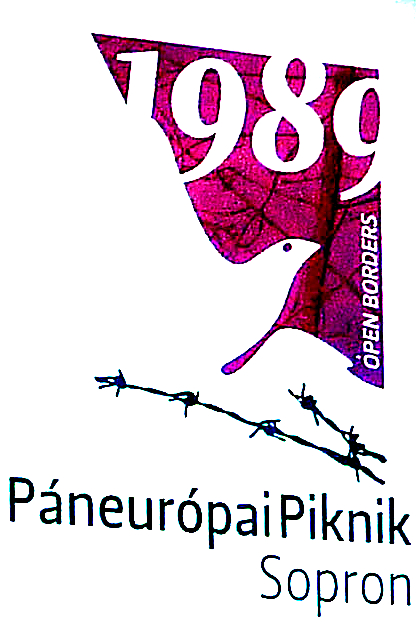
After the Pan-European Picnic, Honecker lost control of the country.

One month after the 1989 Polish legislative election in which Lech Wałęsa and the Solidarity Citizens' Committee unexpectedly won 99 out of 100 seats, at the Warsaw Pact summit on 7–8 July 1989 in Bucharest, the Soviet Union reaffirmed its shift from the Brezhnev Doctrine of the limited sovereignty of its member states, and announced "freedom of choice". The Bucharest statement prescribed that its signatories henceforth developed their "own political line, strategy and tactics without external intervention". This called into question the Soviet guarantee of existence for the Communist states in Europe. Already in May 1989 Hungary had begun dismantling its border with Austria, creating the first gap in the so-called Iron Curtain, through which later several thousand East Germans quickly fled in hopes of reaching West Germany by way of Austria. But with the mass exodus at the Pan-European Picnic in August 1989 (which was based on an idea by Otto von Habsburg to test Gorbachev's reaction to the opening of the border), the subsequent hesitant behaviour of the Socialist Unity Party of East Germany and the non-intervention of the Soviet Union opened the floodgates. Thus the united front of the Eastern Bloc was broken. The reaction to this from Erich Honecker in the Daily Mirror of 19 August 1989 was too late and showed the current loss of power: "Habsburg distributed leaflets far into Poland, on which the East German holidaymakers were invited to a picnic. When they came to the picnic, they were given gifts, food and Deutsche Mark, and then they were persuaded to come to the West." Later, after his fall, Honecker said of Otto von Habsburg in connection with the summer of 1989: "That this Habsburg drove the nail into my coffin." Now tens of thousands of media-informed East Germans made their way to Hungary, which was no longer ready to keep its borders completely closed or to oblige its border troops to use force of arms. A 1969 treaty required the Hungarian government to send the East Germans back home; however, starting on 11 September 1989, the Hungarians let them pass into Austria, telling their outraged East German counterparts that they were refugees and that international treaties on refugees took precedence.

At the time, Honecker was sidelined through illness, leaving his colleagues unable to act decisively. He had been taken ill with biliary colic during the Warsaw Pact summit. He was shortly afterwards flown home to East Berlin. After an initial stabilisation in his health, he underwent surgery on 18 August 1989 to remove his inflamed gallbladder and, due to a perforation, part of his colon. According to the urologist Peter Althaus, the surgeons left a suspected carcinogenic nodule in Honecker's right kidney due to his weak condition, and also failed to inform the patient of the suspected cancer; other sources say the tumour was simply undetected. As a result of this operation, Honecker was away from his office until late September 1989.

Back in office, Honecker had to contend with the rising number and strength of demonstrations across East Germany that had first been sparked by reports in the West German media of fraudulent results in local elections on 7 May 1989, the same results he had labelled a "convincing reflection" of the populace's faith in his leadership. He also had to deal with a new refugee problem. Several thousand East Germans tried to go to West Germany by way of Czechoslovakia, only to have that government bar them from passing. Several thousands of them headed straight for the West German embassy in Prague and demanded safe passage to West Germany. With some reluctance, Honecker allowed them to go – but forced them to go back through East Germany on sealed trains and stripped them of their East German citizenship. Several members of the SED Politbüro realised this was a serious blunder and made plans to get rid of him.

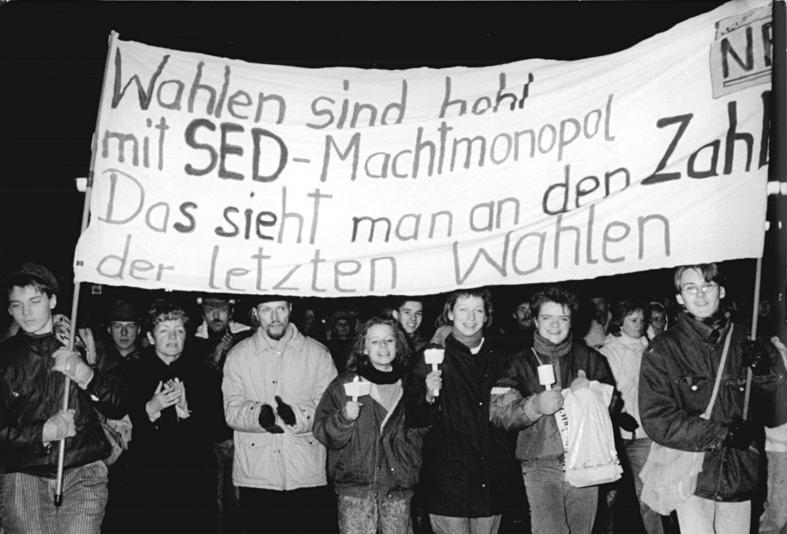
East Germans protest against Honecker's hardline regime hindering reforms, 1989.

As unrest visibly grew, large numbers began fleeing the country through the West German embassies in Prague and Budapest, as well as over the borders of the "socialist brother" states. Each month saw tens of thousands more exit. On 3 October 1989 East Germany closed its borders to its eastern neighbours and prevented visa-free travel to Czechoslovakia; a day later these measures were also extended to travel to Bulgaria and Romania. East Germany was now not only behind the Iron Curtain to the West, but also cordoned off from most other Eastern bloc states.

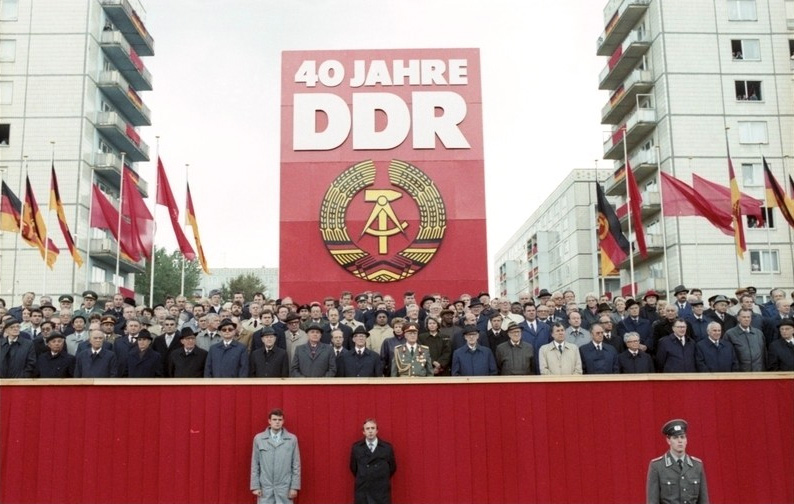
Honecker, with Gorbachev on his right, on the tribune of East Germany's 40th anniversary celebration, shortly before his forced resignation.

On 6–7 October 1989 the national celebrations of the 40th anniversary of the East German state took place with Gorbachev in attendance. To the surprise of Honecker and the other SED leaders in attendance, several hundred members of the Free German Youth — reckoned as the future vanguard of the party and nation — began chanting, "Gorby, help us! Gorby, save us!". In a private conversation between the two leaders Honecker praised the success of the country, but Gorbachev knew that, in reality, it faced bankruptcy; East Germany had already accepted billions of dollars in loans from West Germany during the decade as it sought to stabilise its economy. Attempting to make Honecker accept a need for reforms, Gorbachev warned Honecker that "He who is too late is punished by life", yet Honecker maintained that "we will solve our problems ourselves with socialist means". Protests outside the reception at the Palace of the Republic led to hundreds of arrests in which many were brutally beaten by soldiers and police.

Being able to have an apartment, a job, clothes to put on, something to eat, and not having to sleep under bridges: that was already, for Erich Honecker, socialism.

— Hans Modrow, 2005.

As the reform movement spread throughout Central and Eastern Europe, mass demonstrations against the East German government erupted, most prominently in Leipzig—the first of several demonstrations which took place on Monday nights across the country. In response, an elite paratroop unit was dispatched to Leipzig—almost certainly on Honecker's orders, since he was commander-in-chief of the Army. A bloodbath was averted only when local party officials themselves ordered the troops to pull back. In the following week, Honecker faced a torrent of criticism. This gave his Politburo comrades the impetus they needed to replace him.

After a crisis meeting of the Politburo on 10–11 October 1989, Honecker's planned state visit to Denmark was cancelled and, despite his resistance, at the insistence of the regime's number-two-man, Egon Krenz, a public statement was issued that called for "suggestions for attractive socialism". Over the following days Krenz worked to secure himself the support of the military and the Stasi and arranged a meeting between Gorbachev and Politburo member Harry Tisch, who was in Moscow, to inform the Kremlin about the now-planned removal of Honecker; Gorbachev reportedly wished them good luck.

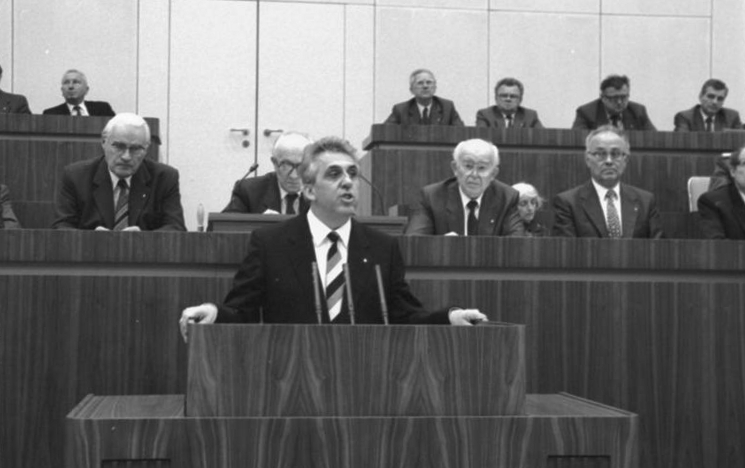
Egon Krenz introduces himself to the People's Chamber as Honecker's replacement for general secretary.

The sitting of the SED Central Committee planned for the end of November 1989 was pulled forward a week, with the most urgent item on the agenda now being the composition of the Politburo. Krenz and Mielke attempted by telephone on the night of 16 October to win other Politburo members over to remove Honecker. At the beginning of the session on 17 October, Honecker asked his routine question of "Are there any suggestions for the agenda?" Stoph replied, "Please, general secretary, Erich, I propose that a new item be placed on the agenda. It is the release of Comrade Erich Honecker as general secretary and the election of Comrade Egon Krenz in his place." Honecker reportedly calmly responded: "Well, then I open the debate".

All those present then spoke, in turn, but none in favour of Honecker. Günter Schabowski even extended the dismissal of Honecker to also include his posts in the State Council and as Chairman of the National Defence Council while childhood friend Günter Mittag moved away from Honecker. Mielke, hollering and pounding the conference room table with his fist pointed at Honecker and blamed him for almost all the country's current ills and threatened to publish compromising information that he possessed, if Honecker refused to resign. A ZDF documentary on the matter claims this information was contained in a large red briefcase found in Mielke's possession in 1990. After three hours the Politburo voted to remove Honecker. In accordance with longstanding practice, Honecker voted for his own removal. As a concession to Honecker, he was allowed to publicly save face by resigning due to "ill health". Krenz was unanimously elected as his successor as General Secretary. This closely echoed how Honecker helped force Ulbricht out 18 years earlier; he too had been publicly allowed to retire for health reasons.

== Start of prosecution and asylum attempts ==
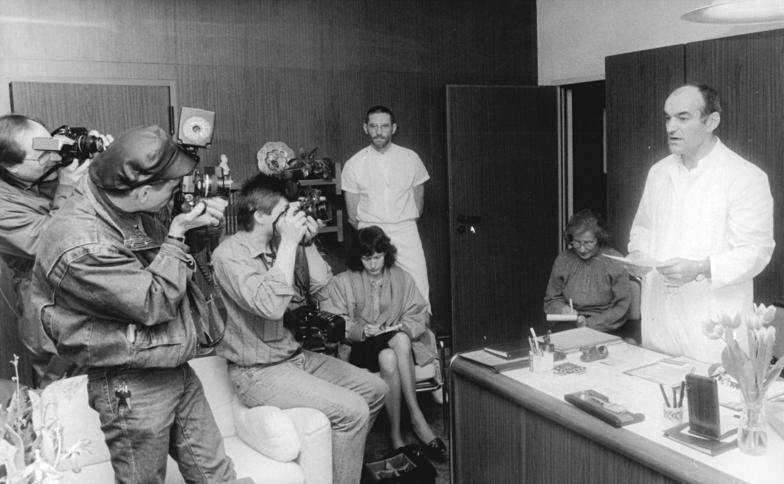
Surgeon Peter Althaus informs media in January 1990 that Honecker is too ill to be detained.

Three weeks after Honecker's ousting the Berlin Wall fell, and the SED swiftly lost control of the country. On 1 December, the Volkskammer deleted the provisions in the East German constitution giving the SED a monopoly on power, thus formally ending Communist rule in East Germany two months after Honecker's removal. In an effort to rehabilitate itself, the SED expelled Honecker and several other former officials two days later. He went on to join the newly founded Communist Party of Germany in 1990, remaining a member until his death.

During November the Volkskammer had already set up a committee to investigate corruption and abuses of office, with Honecker being alleged to have received annual donations from the National Academy of Architecture of around 20,000 marks as an "honorary member". On 5 December 1989 the chief public prosecutor in East Germany formally launched a judicial inquiry against him on charges of high treason, abuses of confidence and embezzlement to the serious disadvantage of socialist property (the charge of high treason was dropped in March 1990). As a result, Honecker was placed under house arrest for a month.

Following the lifting of his house arrest, Honecker and his wife Margot were forced to vacate their apartment in the Waldsiedlung housing area in Wandlitz, exclusively used by senior SED party members, after the Volkskammer decided to put it to use as a sanatorium for the disabled. In any case, Honecker spent the majority of January 1990 in hospital after having the error of the tumour missed in 1989 corrected after the suspicion of cancer was confirmed. Upon leaving the hospital on 29 January he was re-arrested and held at the Berlin-Rummelsburg remand centre. However, on the evening of the following day, 30 January, Honecker was again released from custody: The district court had annulled the arrest warrant and, due to medical reports, certified him unfit for detention and interrogation.

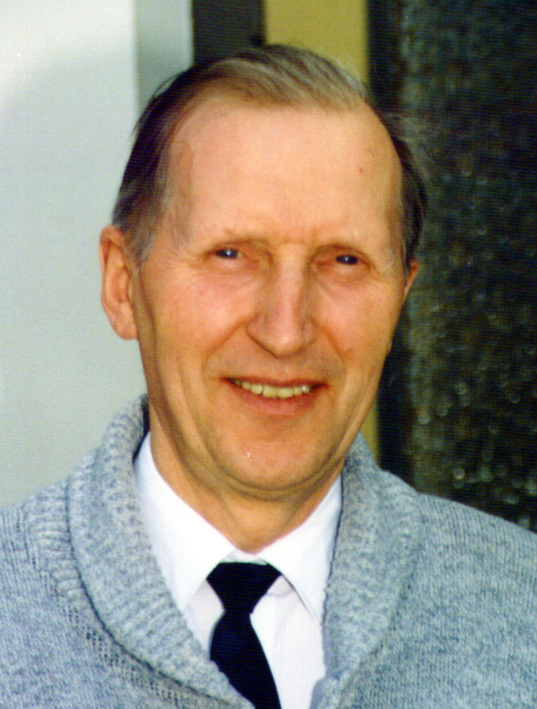
Pastor Uwe Holmer gave the Honeckers sanctuary in 1990.

Lacking a home, Honecker instructed his lawyer Wolfgang Vogel to ask the Evangelical Church in Berlin-Brandenburg for help. Pastor Uwe Holmer, leader of the Hoffnungstal Institute in Lobetal, Bernau bei Berlin, offered the couple a home in his vicarage. This drew immediate condemnation and later demonstrations against the church for assisting the Honeckers, given they had both discriminated against Christians who did not conform with the SED leadership's ideology. Aside from a stay at a holiday home in Lindow in March 1990 that lasted only one day before protests swiftly brought it to an end, the couple resided at the Holmer residence until 3 April 1990.

The couple then moved into a three-room living quarters within the Soviet military hospital in Beelitz. Here, doctors diagnosed a malignant liver tumour following another re-examination. Following German reunification, prosecutors in Berlin issued a further arrest warrant for Honecker in November 1990 on charges that he gave the order to fire on escapees at the Inner German border in 1961 and had repeatedly reiterated that command (most specifically in 1974). However, this warrant was not enforceable because Honecker lay under the protection of Soviet authorities in Beelitz. On 13 March 1991 the Honeckers fled Germany from the Soviet-controlled Sperenberg Airfield to Moscow on a military jet with the aid of Soviet hardliners.

The German Chancellery had only been informed by Soviet diplomats about the Honeckers’ flight to Moscow one hour in advance. It limited its response to a public protest, claiming the existence of an arrest warrant meant the Soviet Union was breaching international law by admitting Honecker. The initial Soviet reaction was that Honecker was now too ill to travel and was receiving medical treatment after a deterioration of his health. He underwent further surgery the following month.

On 11 December 1991 the Honeckers sought refuge in the Chilean Embassy in Moscow, while also applying for political asylum in the Soviet Union. Despite an offer of help from North Korea, Honecker instead reached out to the Chilean government under Christian Democrat Patricio Aylwin. Under Honecker's rule, East Germany had granted many Chileans exile following the military coup of 1973 by Augusto Pinochet. In addition his daughter Sonja was married to a Chilean. Chilean authorities, however, stated he could not enter their country without a valid German passport.

Mikhail Gorbachev agreed to the dissolution of the Soviet Union on 25 December 1991 and gave all his powers to Russian president Boris Yeltsin. Russian authorities had long been keen on expelling Honecker, against the wishes of Gorbachev, and the new government now demanded that he leave the country or else face deportation.

In June 1992, President Aylwin assured German Chancellor Helmut Kohl that Honecker would be leaving the Chilean Embassy in Moscow. Reportedly against his will, Honecker was ejected from the embassy on 29 July 1992 and flown to Berlin Tegel Airport, where he was arrested and detained in Moabit Prison. By contrast, his wife Margot travelled on a direct flight from Moscow to Santiago, Chile, where she initially stayed with her daughter Sonja. Honecker's lawyers unsuccessfully appealed for him to be released from detention in the period leading up to his trial.

== Criminal trial ==
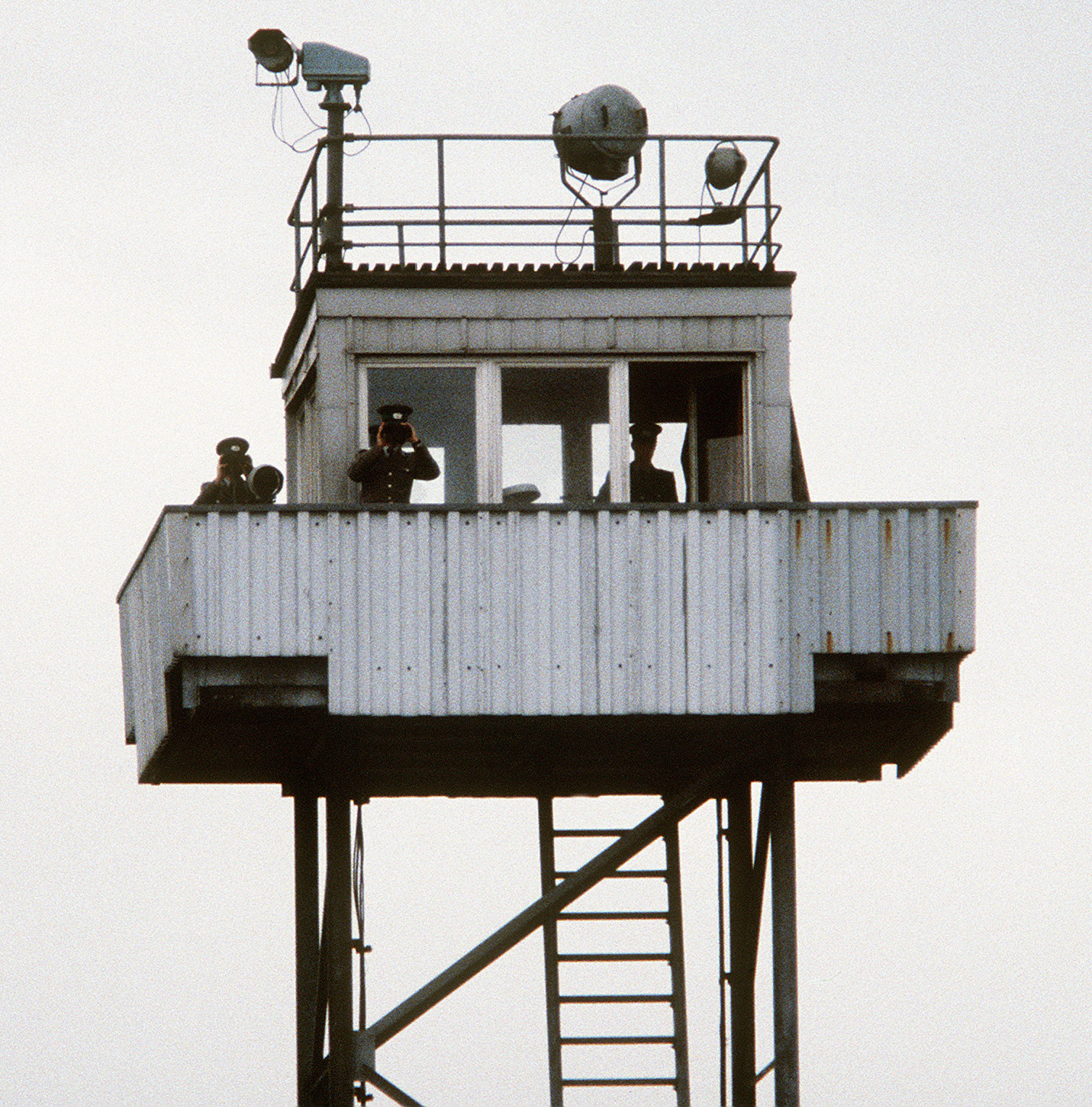
Honecker gave orders to fire along the inner German border.

On 12 May 1992, while under protection in the Chilean embassy in Moscow, Honecker, along with several co-defendants, including Erich Mielke, Willi Stoph, Heinz Kessler, Fritz Streletz and Hans Albrecht, were accused in a 783-page indictment of taking part in the "collective manslaughter" of 68 people as they attempted to flee East Germany. It was alleged that Honecker, in his role as Chairman of the National Defence Council, had both given the decisive order in 1961 for the construction of the Berlin Wall and also, at subsequent meetings, ordered the extensive expansion of the border fortifications around West Berlin and the barriers to the West so as to make any passing impossible. In addition, specifically at a May 1974 sitting of the National Defence Council, he had stated that the development of the border must continue, that lines of fire were warranted along the whole border and, as prior, the use of firearms was essential: "Comrades who have successfully used their firearms [are] to be praised".

The charges were approved by the Berlin District Court on 19 October 1992 at the opening of the trial. On the same day, it was decided that the hearing of 56 charges would be postponed and the remaining twelve cases would be the subject of the trial to begin on 12 November 1992. The question of under which laws the former East German leader could be tried was highly controversial and, in the view of many jurists, the process had an uncertain outcome.

During his 70-minute-long statement to the court on 3 December 1992, Honecker said that he had political responsibility for the building of the Berlin Wall and subsequent deaths at the borders, but claimed he was "without juridical, legal or moral guilt". He blamed the escalation of the Cold War for the building of the Berlin Wall, saying the decision had not been taken solely by the East German leadership but all the Warsaw Pact countries that had collectively concluded in 1961 that a "Third World War with millions dead" would be unavoidable without this action. He quoted several West German politicians who had opined that the wall had indeed reduced and stabilised the two factions. He stated that he had always regretted every death, both from a human point of view and due to the political damage they caused.

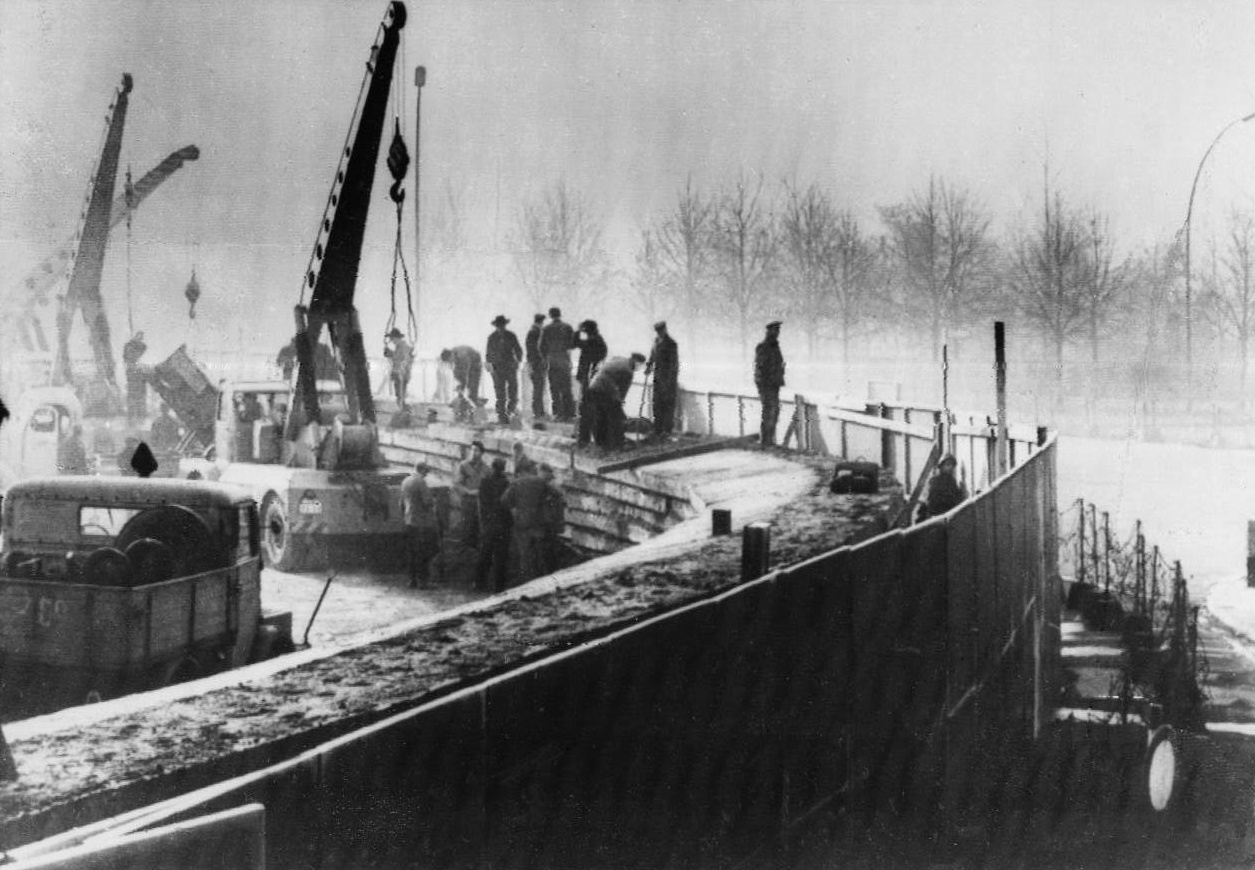
Honecker said the Berlin Wall was "unavoidable" to prevent a "third World War with millions dead".

Making reference to past trials in Germany against communists and socialists such as Karl Marx and August Bebel, he claimed that the legal process against him was politically motivated and a "show trial" against communism. He stated that no court lying in the territory of West Germany had the legal right to place him, his co-defendants or any East German citizen on trial, and that the portrayal of East Germany as an "Unrechtsstaat" was contradictory to its recognition by over one hundred other states and the UN Security Council. Furthermore, he questioned how a German court could now legally judge his political decisions in the light of the lack of legal action taken over various military operations that had been carried out by Western countries with either overt support or absence of condemnation from (West) Germany. He dismissed public criticism of the Stasi arguing that it was analogous to journalists denouncing others, an activity praised in Western countries. While accepting political responsibility for the deaths at the Wall, he believed he was free of any "legal or moral guilt", and thought that East Germany would go down in history as "a sign that socialism is possible and is better than capitalism".

By the time of the proceedings Honecker was already seriously ill. A new CT scan in August 1992 had confirmed an ultrasound examination made in Moscow and the existence of a malignant tumour in the right lobe of his liver. Based on these findings and additional medical testimonies, Honecker's lawyers requested that the legal proceedings, as far as they were aimed against their client, be abandoned and the arrest warrant against him withdrawn; the cases against both Mielke and Stoph had already been postponed due to their ill health. Arguing that his life expectancy was estimated to be three to six months, while the legal process was forecast to take at least two years, his lawyers questioned whether it was humane to try a dying man. Their application was rejected on 21 December 1992 when the court concluded that, given the seriousness of the charges, no obstacle to the proceedings existed.

Honecker lodged a constitutional complaint to the recently created Constitutional Court of the State of Berlin, stating that the decision to proceed violated his fundamental right to human dignity, which was an overriding principle in the Constitution of Berlin, above even the state penal system and criminal justice. On 12 January 1993, Honecker's complaint was upheld and the Berlin District Court therefore abandoned the case and withdrew their arrest warrant. An application for a new arrest warrant was rejected on 13 January. The court also refused to commence with the trial related to the indictment of 12 November 1992, and withdrew the second arrest warrant related to these charges. After a total of 169 days Honecker was released from custody, drawing protests both from victims of the East German regime as well as German political figures.

Honecker flew via Brazil to Santiago, Chile, to reunite with his wife and his daughter Sonja, who lived there with her son Roberto. Upon his arrival he was greeted by the leaders of the Chilean Communist and Socialist parties. In contrast, his co-defendants Heinz Kessler, Fritz Streletz and Hans Albrecht were sentenced on 16 September 1993 to imprisonment of between four and seven-and-a-half years. On 13 April 1993 a final attempt to separate and continue the trial against Honecker in his absence was discontinued. Four days later, on the 66th birthday of his wife Margot, he gave a final public speech, ending with the words: "Socialism is the opposite of what we have now in Germany. For that I would like to say that our beautiful memories of the German Democratic Republic are testimony of a new and just society. And we want to always remain loyal to these things."

== Death ==
Honecker died on 29 May 1994 of liver cancer at the age of 81 in a terraced house in the La Reina district of Santiago. His funeral, arranged by the Communist Party of Chile, was conducted the following day at the central cemetery in Santiago.

== Family ==
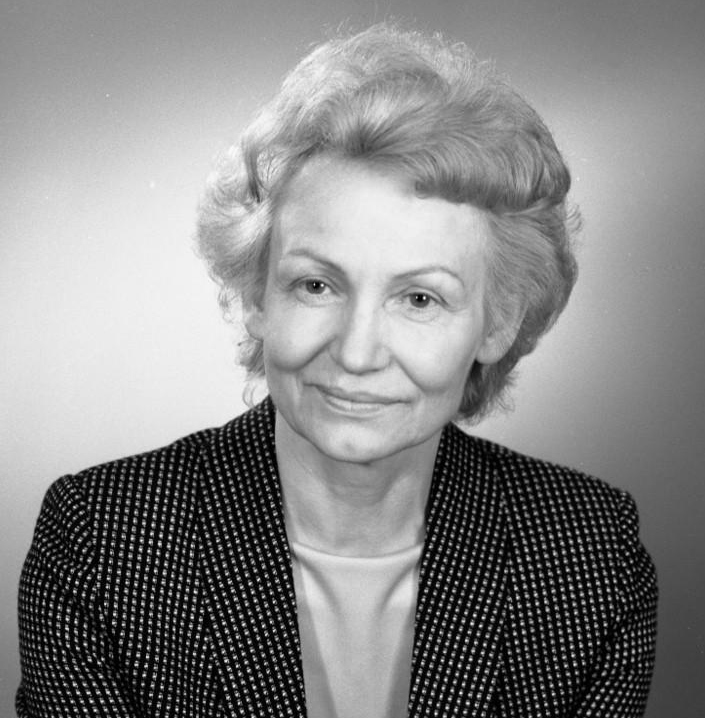
Margot, Honecker's wife of forty years

Honecker was married three times. After being liberated from prison in 1945, he married the prison warden Charlotte Schanuel (née Drost), nine years his senior, on 23 December 1946. She died suddenly from a brain tumour in June 1947. Details of this marriage were not revealed until 2003.

By the time of her death, Honecker was already romantically involved with the Free German Youth official Edith Baumann, whom he met on a trip to Moscow. With her, he had a daughter. Sources differ on whether Honecker and Baumann married in 1947 or 1949, but in 1952 he fathered an illegitimate daughter with Margot Feist, a People's Chamber member and chairperson of the Ernst Thälmann Pioneer Organisation.

In September 1950, Baumann wrote directly to Walter Ulbricht to inform him of her husband's extramarital activity in the hope of him pressuring Honecker to end his relationship with Feist. Following his divorce and reportedly under pressure from the Politburo, he married Feist. However, sources again differ on both the year of his divorce from Baumann and of his marriage to Feist; depending on the source, the events took place either in 1953 or 1955. For more than twenty years, Margot Honecker served as Minister of National Education. In 2012 intelligence reports collated by West German spies alleged that both Honecker and his wife had secret affairs but did not divorce for political reasons; however, his bodyguard Bernd Brückner, in a book about his time spent in Honecker's service, denied the claims.

== Honours and awards ==
=== National honours ===
- East Germany:
  - Hero of the German Democratic Republic, twice (1982, 1987)
  - Hero of Labour (1962)
  - Honor clasp in Gold of the Patriotic Order of Merit (1955)
  - Order of Karl Marx, five times (1969, 1972, 1977, 1982, 1985)
  - Order of the Banner of Labor

=== Foreign honours ===
- Austria:
  - Grand Star of the Order of Honour for Services to the Republic of Austria
- People's Republic of Bulgaria:
  - Order of Georgi Dimitrov
- Cuba:
  - Order of José Martí
  - Order of Playa Girón (1986)
- Czechoslovakia:
  - First Class of the Order of the White Lion (1987)
  - Order of Klement Gottwald (1982)
- Finland:
  - Commander of the Grand Cross of the White Rose of Finland (1977)
- Polish People's Republic:
  - Grand Cordon of the Order of Merit of the People's Republic of Poland
- Nicaragua:
  - First Class of the Order of Augusto César Sandino
- North Korea:
  - First Class of the Order of the National Flag (1988)
- Socialist Republic of Romania:
  - Order of Victory of Socialism (1987)
- Soviet Union:
  - Hero of the Soviet Union (1982)
  - Order of Lenin, thrice (1972, 1982, 1987)
  - Order of the October Revolution (1977)
  - Medal "For Strengthening of Brotherhood in Arms" (1980)
  - Jubilee Medal "In Commemoration of the 100th Anniversary of the Birth of Vladimir Ilyich Lenin" (1969)
  - Honorary citizen of the city of Magnitogorsk, Chelyabinsk Oblast (1989)
- Vietnam
  - Gold Star Order (1982)
- Yugoslavia:
  - Order of the Yugoslav Great Star (1974)
- International Olympic Committee:
  - Olympic Order (1985)

== In popular culture ==
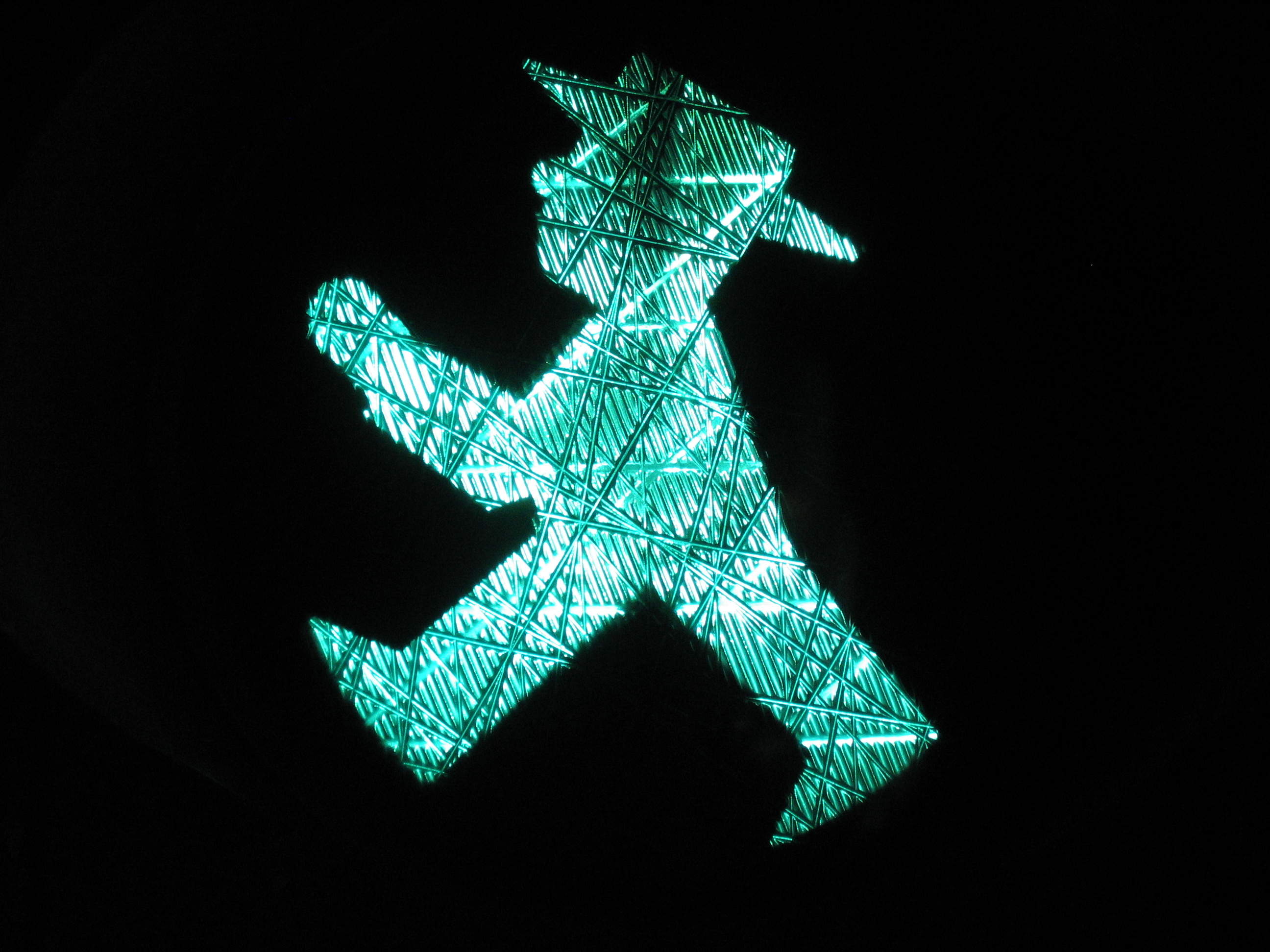
According to legend, the East German Ampelmann's hat was inspired by Honecker's use of the accessory.

Dmitri Vrubel's 1990 mural on the Berlin Wall My God, Help Me to Survive This Deadly Love, depicting a socialist fraternal kiss between Honecker and Leonid Brezhnev, became known around the world.

According to legend, Karl Peglau's design for East German crossing signals, showing a figure wearing a jaunty hat, was inspired by Honecker's frequent use of a straw hat. The Ost-Ampelmännchen has become an enduring symbol of Ostalgie.

British actor Paul Freeman portrayed Honecker in the British-German short film Whispers of Freedom. Rammstein lead singer Till Lindemann portrayed him in the music video for the band's song Deutschland.

== Notes ==
Party political offices
Preceded by Walter Ulbricht	General Secretary of the Central Committee of the Socialist Unity Party of Germany; 1971–1989	Succeeded by Egon Krenz
Political offices
Preceded by Willi Stoph	Chairman of the Council of State of the German Democratic Republic; 1976–1989	Succeeded by Egon Krenz
