= Karl Namokel =

German politician (1927-1988)

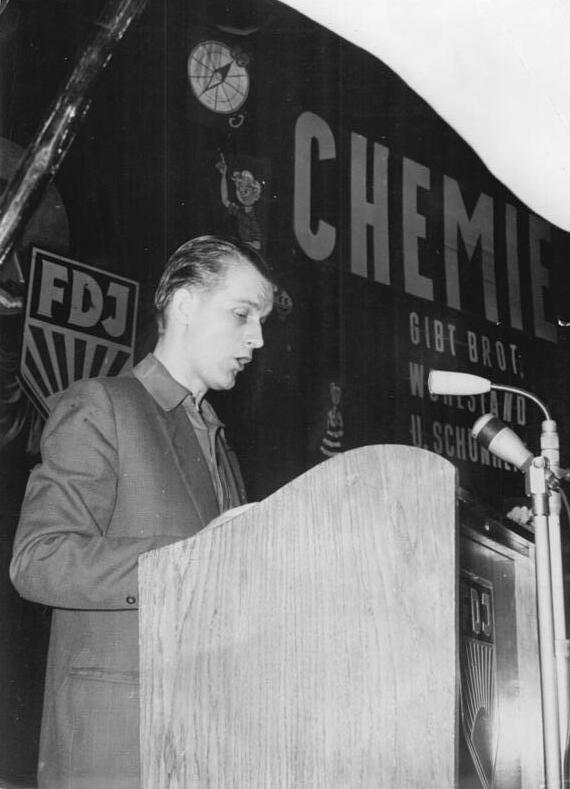
- Namokel in 1959

First Secretary of the Free German Youth
- In office 27 May 1955 – 15 May 1959
- Deputy: Werner Felfe
- Preceded by: Erich Honecker
- Succeeded by: Horst Schumann

Member of the Volkskammer
- In office October 1958 – 1963

Personal details
- Born: 9 August 1927 Demmin, Weimar Republic (now Germany)
- Died: 25 July 1988 (aged 60) Rostock, East Germany
- Party: Socialist Unity Party (1946–1989)
- Other political affiliations: Communist Party of Germany

Karl Namokel (9 August 1927 – 25 July 1988) was a German politician. He was first Secretary of the Central Council of the Free German Youth (FDJ) and a member of the Volkskammer of the East Germany.

== Life ==
Born in Demmin as son of a baker, Namokel attended elementary school and was then trained as a shipbuilder in Stettin from 1942 to 1944. On 12 February 1944, he applied for membership in the NSDAP and was accepted on 20 April that year (membership number 9,893,452). Namokel then served in the Reich Labor Service and from September 1944 to May 1945 was a Wehrmacht soldier with the final rank of sailor. On 5 May 1945, he deserted and returned to Demmin.

Namokel got by with odd jobs and joined the Communist Party of Germany in 1945, becoming a member of the Socialist Unity Party of Germany (SED) and FDJ in 1946. From June 1948 to January 1949 he was 1st Secretary of the FDJ District Leadership in Demmin. After attending the Mecklenburg State Party School, Namokel went to the Volkswerft in Stralsund, where he was Secretary of the FDJ Basic Organization from June 1949 to 1950 and then first Secretary of the SED Party Organization until 1951. From February 1951 to March 1952 he attended the CPSU Party School in Moscow. After that, from April to July 1952 he was Secretary for Economics of the SED State Leadership in Mecklenburg and then Secretary for Economics of the SED District Leadership in Rostock until May 1955, and from 1954 to 1955 he was a member of the Rostock District Assembly.

From May 1955 to May 1959, Namokel was the successor to Erich Honecker as First Secretary of the Central Council of the FDJ. At the 6th Parliament of the FDJ he was replaced due to "weaknesses and his lack of experience in youth work". From July 1958 to January 1963 he was a member of the Central Committee of the SED. At the same time he was a member of the Volkskammer from October 1958 to 1963 and was chairman of the Youth Committee.

From 1959 to 1963 Namokel studied shipbuilding in Rostock- Warnemünde, graduating as a naval architect and then worked as an employee in the vocational training department of Volkseigener Betrieb Schiffbau and its successor institution Kombinat Schiffbau. In May 1986 he received a disability pension.

== Awards ==
- Patriotic Order of Merit (1970)
- Patriotic Order of Merit in Gold (1987)
- Arthur Becker Medal in Gold
