= Leipzig (region) =

Leipzig Direktionsbezirk Leipzig
- Direktionsbezirk
- Map of Saxony highlighting the former Direktionsbezirk of Leipzig
- Coordinates: 51°20′N 12°50′E
- Country: Germany
- State: Saxony
- Disestablished: 1 March 2012
- Region seat: Leipzig

Area
  - Total: 3,964 km^{2} (1,531 sq mi)

Population (31 Dec. 2010)
  - Total: 996,516
  - Density: 251.4/km^{2} (651.1/sq mi)

GDP
  - Total: €46.501 billion (2024)
  - Per capita: €43,418 (2024)
- Website: www.rpl.sachsen.de

Leipzig is one of the three former Direktionsbezirke of Saxony, Germany, located in the north-west of the state. It coincided with the Planungsregion Westsachsen. It was disbanded in March 2012.

== History ==
The Direktionsbezirk Leipzig came into existence on 1 August 2008 and succeeded the Regierungsbezirk Leipzig. The territory of Regierungsbezirk Leipzig was slightly larger, and included the former district of Döbeln. With the exception of the districts Altenburg and Schmölln, the territory of the Regierungsbezirk corresponded to that of the former Bezirk Leipzig which existed from 1952 to 1990.

A Regierungsbezirk Leipzig existed already from 1939 to 1943, when the former Kreishauptmannschaften in Saxony were renamed following the custom in Prussia.

== Subdivision ==
Kreise
(districts)

1. Leipzig
2. Nordsachsen

Kreisfreie Städte
(district-free towns)

1. Leipzig

== See also ==
- Bezirk Leipzig
