= Embassy of Germany, Budapest =

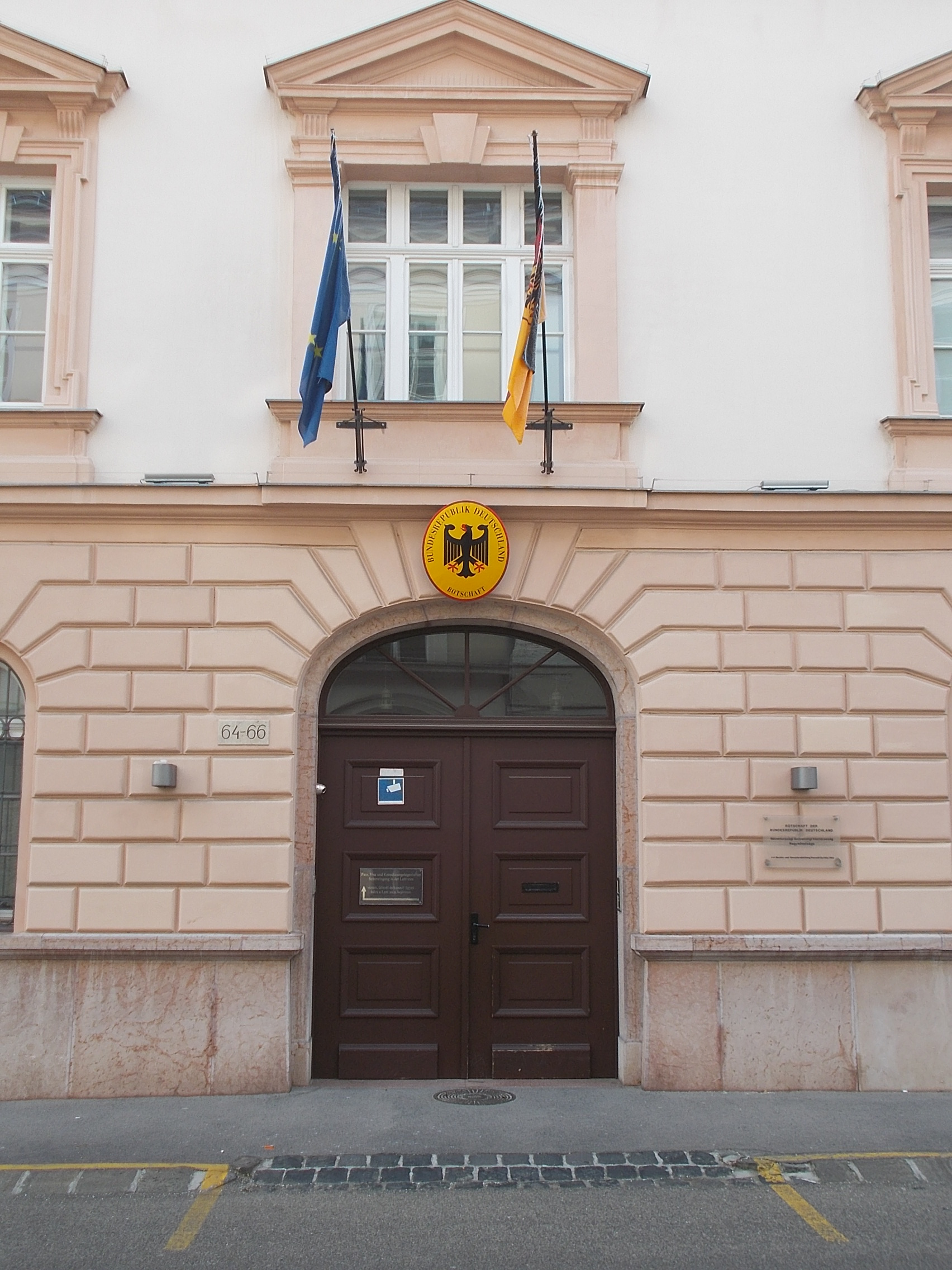
- Location: Budapest District I
- Address: Úri utca 64–66.
- Coordinates: 47.503°N 19.029°E
- Opened: 1993
- Ambassador: Volkmar Wenzel
- Website: budapest.diplo.de

The Embassy of Germany in Budapest is Germany's diplomatic mission to Hungary. It is located at Úri utca 64–66, in the I. Várkerület district.

The building has been listed as UNESCO World Heritage and became the site of the German embassy in 1993, as a result of returning the former site of the Hungarian embassy in Berlin to the state of Hungary. The current ambassador is Volkmar Wenzel (as of January 2020).
