= Coat of arms of Leipzig =

- Armiger: Burkhard Jung, Lord Mayor of Leipzig
- Use: The state logo may be used by the general public while the coat of arms proper is only eligible for use with authorities.

The coat of arms of Leipzig dates back to the 14th century and is based on the Wettin shield of Meissen. It had the lion from the start and to it was added a second field with blue pales around 1475. These are called the Landsberg pales, for Leipzig was under the Margraviate of Landsberg.

Only the city may use the arms, as it is the right of it as the right of its name according to German law.

The coat of arms of Chemnitz is very similar.
