= 3rd Council of Ministers of the German Democratic Republic =

Government of the German Democratic Republic

Fourth cabinet of Otto Grotewohl Cabinet Grotewohl IV
- 3rd government of the German Democratic Republic

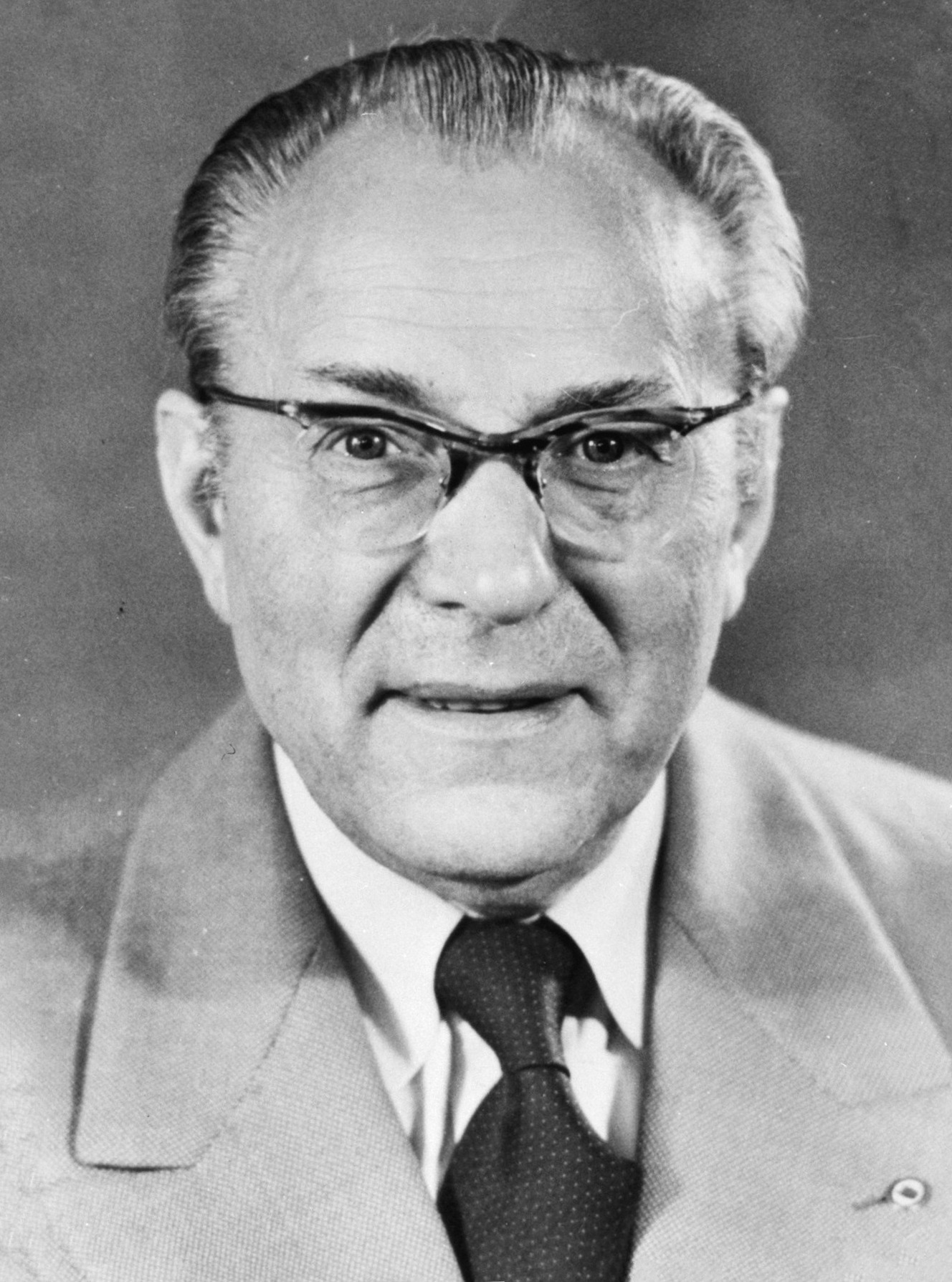
- Date formed: 8 December 1958
- Date dissolved: 7 October 1963

People and organisations
- Head of government: Otto Grotewohl
- No. of ministers: 22

History
- Predecessor: Grotewohl III
- Successor: Grotewohl V

The following overview lists the ministers and state secretaries of the 3rd Council of Ministers of the GDR from December 8, 1958, to October 7, 1963.

== Ministries ==
The government consisted of:

| Portfolio | Minister | Took office | Left office | Party |
|---|---|---|---|---|
| Chairman | Otto Grotewohl | 8 December 1958 | 7 October 1963 | SED |
| First Deputy Chairman | Walter Ulbricht | 8 December 1958 | 12 September 1960 | SED |
| Deputy Chairman | Heinrich Rau | 8 December 1958 | 23 March 1961 | SED |
| Deputy Chairman | Willi Stoph | 8 December 1958 | 7 October 1963 | SED |
| Deputy Chairman | Hans Loch | 8 December 1958 | 7 October 1963 | LDPD |
| Deputy Chairman | Max Sefrin | 8 December 1958 | 7 October 1963 | CDU |
| Deputy Chairman | Lothar Bolz | 8 December 1958 | 7 October 1963 | NDPD |
| Deputy Chairman | Paul Scholz | 8 December 1958 | 7 October 1963 | DBD |
| Deputy Chairman | Bruno Leuschner | 8 December 1958 | 7 October 1963 | SED |
| Ministry of Agriculture and Forestry | Hans Reichelt | 8 December 1958 | 7 February 1963 replaced by Agricultural Council | DBD |
| Ministry of Construction | Ernst Scholz | 8 December 1958 | 7 October 1963 | SED |
| Ministry of Finance | Willy Rumpf | 8 December 1958 | 7 October 1963 | SED |
| Ministry of Foreign Affairs | Lothar Bolz | 8 December 1958 | 7 October 1963 | NDPD |
| Ministry of the Interior | Karl Maron | 8 December 1958 | 7 October 1963 | SED |
| Ministry of Justice | Hilde Benjamin | 8 December 1958 | 7 October 1963 | SED |
| Minister of Post and Telecommunications | Friedrich Burmeister | 8 December 1958 | 7 October 1963 | CDU |
| Ministry of Public Education | Alfred Lemmnitz | 8 December 1958 | 7 October 1963 | SED |
| Minister of State Security | Erich Mielke | 8 December 1958 | 7 October 1963 | SED |
| Minister for Foreign Trade and Internal German Trade | Heinrich Rau | 8 December 1958 | 23 March 1961 | SED |
| Ministry of Transport | Erwin Kramer | 8 December 1958 | 7 October 1963 | SED |
| Ministry of Health | Max Sefrin | 8 December 1958 | 7 October 1963 | CDU |

== Ministry-level Committees ==
| Portfolio | Minister | Took office | Left office | Party |
|---|---|---|---|---|
| Chairman of the State Planning Commission | Bruno Leuschner | 8 December 1958 | 7 October 1963 | SED |
| Chairman of the State Planning Commission | Karl Mewis | 6 July 1961 | 12 January 1963 | SED |
| Chairman of the State Planning Commission | Erich Apel | 12 January 1963 | 7 October 1963 | SED |
| First Deputy Chairman of the State Planning Commission | Kurt Gregor | 8 December 1958 | 6 July 1961 | SED |
| First Deputy Chairman of the State Planning Commission | Rudolf Müller | 6 July 1961 | 7 October 1963 | SED |
| First Deputy Chairman of the State Planning Commission | Karl Grünheid | March 1963 | 7 October 1963 | SED |
| Chairman of the Agricultural Council | Karl-Heinz Bartsch | 7 February 1963 | 9 February 1963 | SED |
| Chairman of the Agricultural Council | Georg Ewald | 9 February 1963 | 7 October 1963 | SED |
| Chairman of the Central Committee for State Control | Ernst Wabra (acting) | 8 December 1958 | November 1961 | SED |
| Chairman of the Central Committee for State Control | Hans Jendretzky | November 1961 | 14 May 1963 replaced by Workers' and Peasants' Inspection | SED |
| Minister and Chairman of the Workers' and Peasants' Inspection | Heinz Matthes | 14 May 1963 | 7 October 1963 | SED |

== Sources ==
- Herbert Hömig (1985). "Loch, Hans". Neue Deutsche Biographie (in German). Vol. 14. Berlin: Duncker & Humblot. pp. 742–743. (full text online).
- Wer war wer in der DDR?
- Carl Steinhoff: erster DDR-Innenminister : Wandlungen eines bürgerlichen Sozialisten / Lutz Maeke
- "BIOGRAPHISCHE DATENBANKEN". election.de (in German).
- Gesetz über die Regierung der DDR: Online-Veröffentlichung, retrieved 10 January 2018
- Gesetz über die Bildung eines Ministeriums für Staatssicherheit: http://www.verfassungen.de/de/ddr/mfsbildung50.htm Online-Veröffentlichung, retrieved 10 January 2018.

Government offices
| Preceded by Grotewohl II | Cabinets of the German Democratic Republic; 8 December 1958-7 October 1963 | Succeeded by Grotewohl IV |
