= 1st Council of Ministers of the German Democratic Republic =

Government of the German Democratic Republic

Second cabinet of Otto Grotewohl Cabinet Grotewohl II
- 1st government of the German Democratic Republic

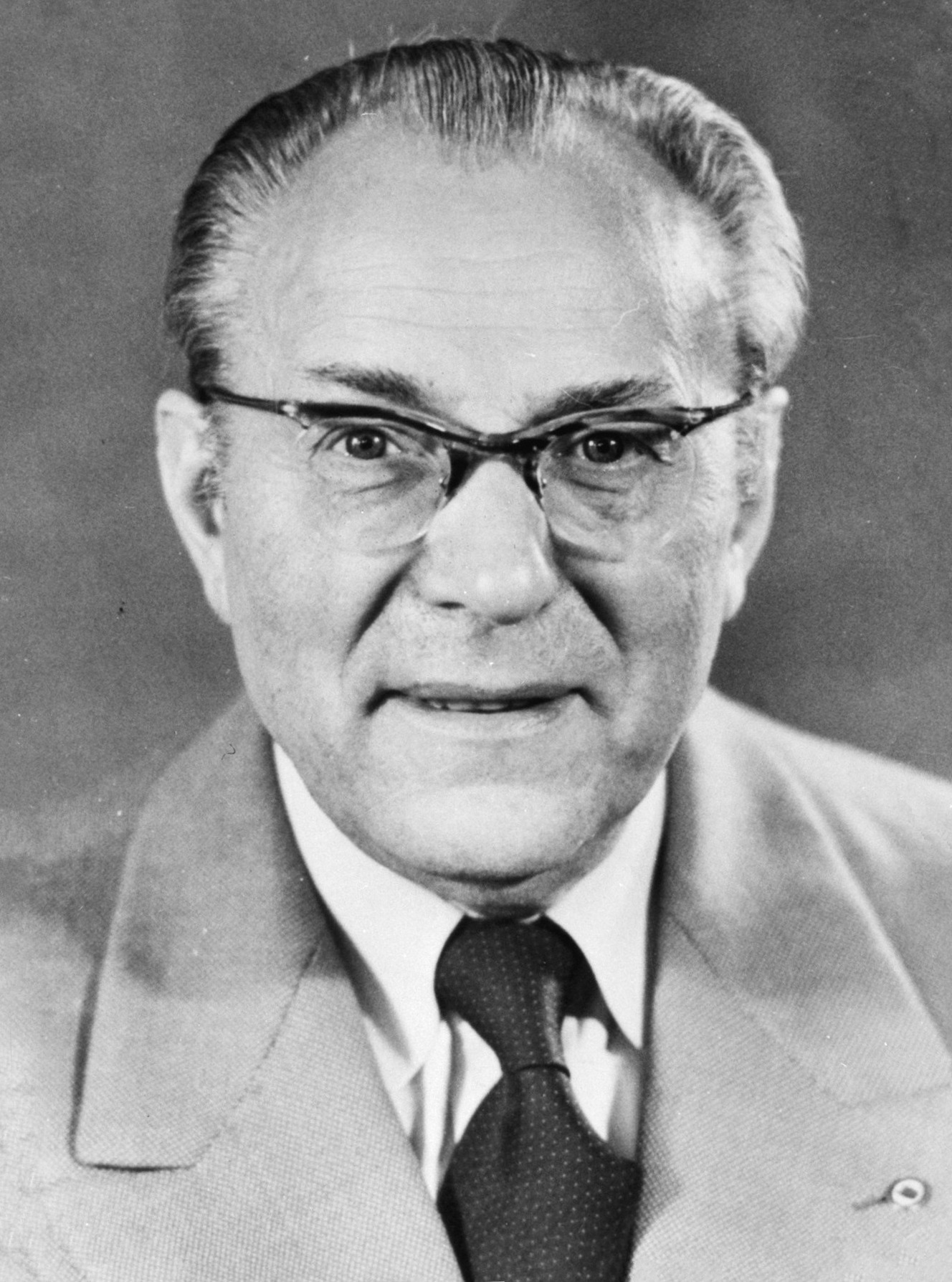
- Date formed: 8 November 1950
- Date dissolved: 19 November 1954

People and organisations
- President: Wilhelm Pieck
- Minister-President: Otto Grotewohl
- No. of ministers: 15

History
- Predecessor: Grotewohl I
- Successor: Grotewohl III

At the inaugural meeting of the Volkskammer on 8 November 1950, Otto Grotewohl was elected Prime Minister. At the same time, the law on the government of the German Democratic Republic was approved and thus given a structure. Grotewohl presented his government at the 2nd meeting of the People's Chamber on 15 November 1950. Among them were 4 state secretaries with their own portfolio, whose secretariats were set up by resolution at the 1st government meeting, which took place before the 2nd Volkskammer conference. At the 2nd government meeting on November 16, 1950, the respective state secretaries of the ministries were appointed by resolution. Among the 21 ministers and almost 30 state secretaries were 13 candidates and members of the Central Committee of the SED, including 4 members of the Politburo. The block parties were represented by a total of 9 ministers and 8 state secretaries, with the CDU alone providing 4 ministers. The DBD was the only block party that did not provide a deputy prime minister at the beginning of the government period. The following overview lists the ministers and state secretaries of the GDR government at the beginning of the government period.

== Ministries ==
The government consisted of:

Portfolio	Minister	Took office	Left office	Party
Minister-President	Otto Grotewohl	16 November 1950	19 November 1954	SED
Deputy Minister-President	Walter Ulbricht	16 November 1950	19 November 1954	SED
Deputy Minister-President	Otto Nuschke	16 November 1950	19 November 1954	CDU
Deputy Minister-President	Heinrich Rau	16 November 1950	19 November 1954	SED
Deputy Minister-President	Hans Loch	16 November 1950	19 November 1954	LDPD
Deputy Minister-President	Lothar Bolz	16 November 1950	19 November 1954	NDPD
Ministry of Agriculture and Forestry	Paul Scholz	16 November 1950	19 November 1954	DBD
Ministry of Construction	Lothar Bolz	16 November 1950	19 November 1954	NDPD
Ministry of Finance	Hans Loch	16 November 1950	19 November 1954	LDPD
Ministry of Foreign Affairs	Georg Dertinger	16 November 1950	19 November 1954	CDU
Ministry for Inner-German Trade, Foreign Trade and Material Supply	Georg Ulrich Handke	16 November 1950	1952	SED
Ministry for Inner-German Trade, Foreign Trade and Material Supply	Kurt Gregor	1952	19 November 1954	SED
Ministry of Heavy Industry	Fritz Selbmann	16 November 1950	19 November 1954	SED
Ministry of the Interior	Karl Steinhoff	16 November 1950	19 November 1954	SED
Ministry of Justice	Max Fechner	16 November 1950	19 November 1954	SED
Ministry of Labor	Roman Chwalek	16 November 1950	19 November 1954	SED
Ministry of Light Industry	William Feldman	16 November 1950	19 November 1954	NDPD
Ministry of Mechanical Engineering	Gerhart Ziller	16 November 1950	19 December 1952	SED
Minister of Post and Telecommunications	Friedrich Burmeister	16 November 1950	19 November 1954	CDU
Ministry of Public Education	Paul Wandel	16 November 1950	19 November 1954	SED
Minister of State Security	Wilhelm Zaisser	16 November 1950	19 November 1954	SED
Ministry of Trade and Supply	Karl Hamann	16 November 1950	19 November 1954	LDPD
Ministry of Transport	Hans Reingruber	16 November 1950	19 November 1954	Independent
Ministry of Health	Luitpold Steidle	16 November 1950	19 November 1954	CDU

== Ministry-level Committees ==
Portfolio	Minister	Took office	Left office	Party
Chairman of the State Planning Commission	Heinrich Rau	16 November 1950	19 November 1954	SED

== Sources ==
- "Government declaration by Otto Grotewohl (Berlin, 12 October 1949)". 27 February 2023.
- Herbert Hömig (1985). "Loch, Hans". Neue Deutsche Biographie (in German). Vol. 14. Berlin: Duncker & Humblot. pp. 742–743. (full text online).
- Wer war wer in der DDR?
- Georg Dertinger
- Carl Steinhoff: erster DDR-Innenminister : Wandlungen eines bürgerlichen Sozialisten / Lutz Maeke
- "BIOGRAPHISCHE DATENBANKEN". election.de (in German).
- Gesetz über die Regierung der DDR: Online-Veröffentlichung, retrieved 10 January 2018
- Gesetz über die Bildung eines Ministeriums für Staatssicherheit: http://www.verfassungen.de/de/ddr/mfsbildung50.htm Online-Veröffentlichung, retrieved 10 January 2018.

Government offices
Preceded by Provisional Government of the German Democratic Republic	Cabinets of the German Democratic Republic; 8 November 1950–19 November 1954	Succeeded by Grotewohl II
