= Heinz Winkler =

Heinz Winkler may refer to:

- Heinz Winkler (politician) (1910–1958), East German Christian Democratic politician
- Heinz Winkler (chef) (1949–2022), Italian-German chef

== See also ==
- Heinz Winckler, South African singer
