= Friedrich Macher =

East German politician (born 1922)

Friedrich Macher (born 27 February 1922) is a German politician. He was a former trade union official of East Germany and politician affiliated with the Socialist Unity Party of Germany. He also served as the Minister for Labor and Vocational Training.

== Early life ==
Macher was born in 1922 in Münzesheim to a boilermaker. He learned the trade of telegraph construction after attending elementary school at Deutsche Post and worked in this profession. From 1940 to 1941, he was obliged to serve as an electromechanic at AEG Berlin. In 1941, he was conscripted into the Wehrmacht and later became a Soviet prisoner of war. During his captivity from 1947 to 1948, he attended the Antifa Central School.

Upon his return, he became a member of the SED and the Free German Trade Union Federation in 1948. He became the deputy head of the Berlin telegraph office of Deutsche Post and later the chairman of the Saxony-Anhalt regional board of the Post and Telecommunications Workers' Union. After studying at the SED Party High School in 1950/51, he became the deputy chairman in 1951 and then the chairman of the Central Board of the Industrial Union (IG) for Post and Telecommunications from April 1952 to 1953. Simultaneously, he was a member of the presidium of the FDGB federal executive.

On 9 December 1953, at the age of 31, he was appointed by the then General Secretaries of the Central Committee of the SED, Walter Ulbricht, to succeed Roman Chwalek as the Minister for Labor. On 4 August 1954, as the Minister for Labor, he initiated the law on the establishment of the order of the "Banner of Labor" during a session of the People's Chamber. When the GDR Council of Ministers was reformed under Prime Minister Otto Grotewohl on 19 November 1954, he became the Minister for Labor and Vocational Training and held this position until February 1958.

On 19 February 1958, Macher became a member of the State Planning Commission and was intended to chair the newly forming Committee for Labor and Wages. However, Walter Heinicke became the chairman of the committee on 22 July 1958, and Macher became his deputy as a member of the State Planning Commission and head of the Labor, Higher Education, and Technical Cadre Department. Later, he served as the secretary of the State Planning Commission and from 1961 to 1964 at the GDR Office for Economic and Scientific-Technical Cooperation with Foreign Countries, or head of Comecon for the GDR Council of Ministers.

In 1964, Macher received his doctorate in economics from the Karl Marx University in Leipzig. Subsequently, he served as the head of the Economics Department of Post and Telecommunications at the Institute for Post and Telecommunications from 1964 to 1968. In 1969, he became a full professor of labor sciences at the Dresden University of Technology and served as the director of the Department of Labor Sciences from 1971 to 1981.

He is married and has four children.

== Awards and decorations ==
- Banner of Labor (1958 and 1980)
- Fritz Heckert Medal (1959)
- Patriotic Order of Merit in Bronze (1977)

== Literature ==
- Andreas Herbst (Ed.), Winfried Ranke, Jürgen Winkler: So funktionierte die DDR. Volume 3: Lexikon der Funktionäre (rororo-Handbuch. No. 6350). Rowohlt, Reinbek bei Hamburg 1994, ISBN 3-499-16350-0, p. 215.
- Friedrich Macher. Minister für Arbeit (und Berufsausbildung) der DDR 1953–1958. Biography on the website of the Independent Historians Commission for the Reassessment of the History of the Reich Ministry of Labor during National Socialism.
