= Council of Ministers of East Germany =

Executive organ of East Germany

Government of the Republic
- Regierung der Republik (German)
- Emblem

Overview
- Established: 8 November 1950; 75 years ago
- Dissolved: October 2, 1990; 35 years ago
- State: German Democratic Republic
- Leader: Chairman (styled Minister President in 1949 Constitution)
- Appointed by: Volkskammer
- Main organ: Council of Ministers
- Ministries: see below
- Headquarters: Altes Stadthaus, Berlin

The Council of Ministers (German: Ministerrat der Deutschen Demokratischen Republik, pronounced [miˈnɪstɐˌʁaːt deːɐ ˌdɔʏtʃn̩ demoˌkʁaːtɪʃn̩ ʁepuˈbliːk]) was the cabinet and executive organ of the German Democratic Republic from November 1950 until the country was reunified on 3 October 1990. Initially called the Government of the Republic under the first East German constitution which nominally established the GDR as a liberal democratic republic, it was redefined by the fully-socialist constitution of 1968 as the executive and administrative organ of East Germany's parliament, the Volkskammer, which was itself redefined as a supreme organ of state power within a one-branch system. It existed from November 1950 until the country was reunified on 3 October 1990. Originally formed as a body of 18 members, by 1989 the council consisted of 44 members.

Under the Constitution of East Germany, the Council of Ministers was formally defined as the government of East Germany. The same Constitution, however, officially confirmed the leading role of the Socialist Unity Party (SED). Hence, for most of the GDR's existence, the Council of Ministers was not the highest authority in the country, but was charged with implementing the SED's policies into practical administration. In particular, ministers were subordinate to the secretary of the Central Committee responsible for their portfolio, and, at least unofficially, to the General Secretary.

== Structure ==
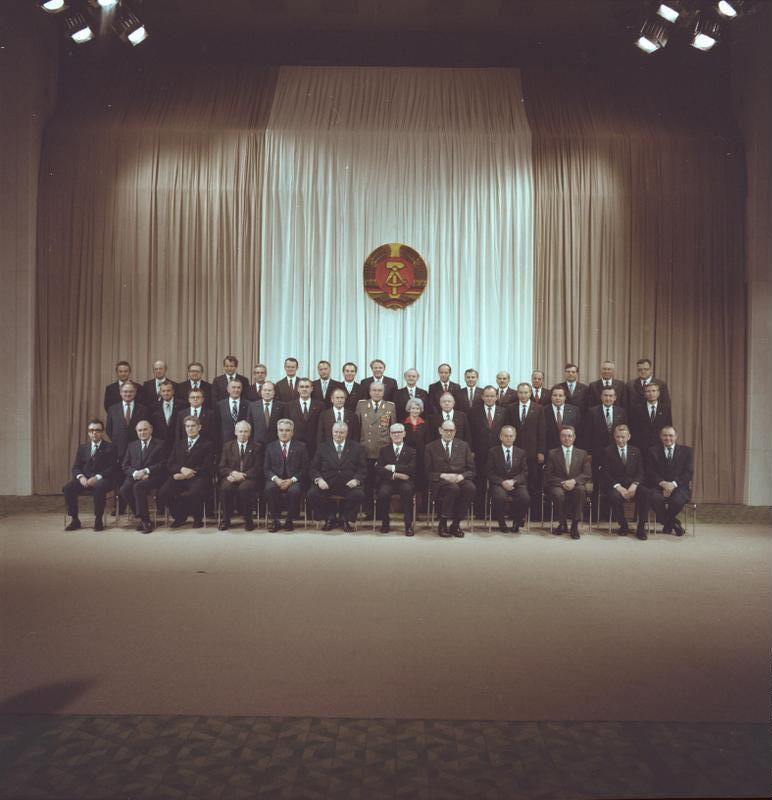
Group photo of Council of Ministers in 1981

The Council was led by a chairman (Vorsitzender), who was usually called "prime minister" in non-German sources. There were two first deputy chairmen and nine other deputy chairmen. Together with some key ministers they formed the presidency (Präsidium) of the Council. The Präsidium prepared all decisions in consultation with the responsible departments of the Central Committee (Zentralkomitee) of the Socialist Unity Party of Germany (SED) and especially the Politbüro of the SED Central Committee. The Präsidium managed the day-to-day affairs of the Council between its weekly meetings, which took place regularly on Wednesdays to execute the resolutions of the Politbüro’s weekly meetings (on Tuesdays). The secretaries and department managers in the Central Committee were authorized to give instructions to the ministers as necessary.

Officially, the prime minister held the highest state post in the GDR. Despite this, no SED first secretary/general secretary ever simultaneously served as prime minister.

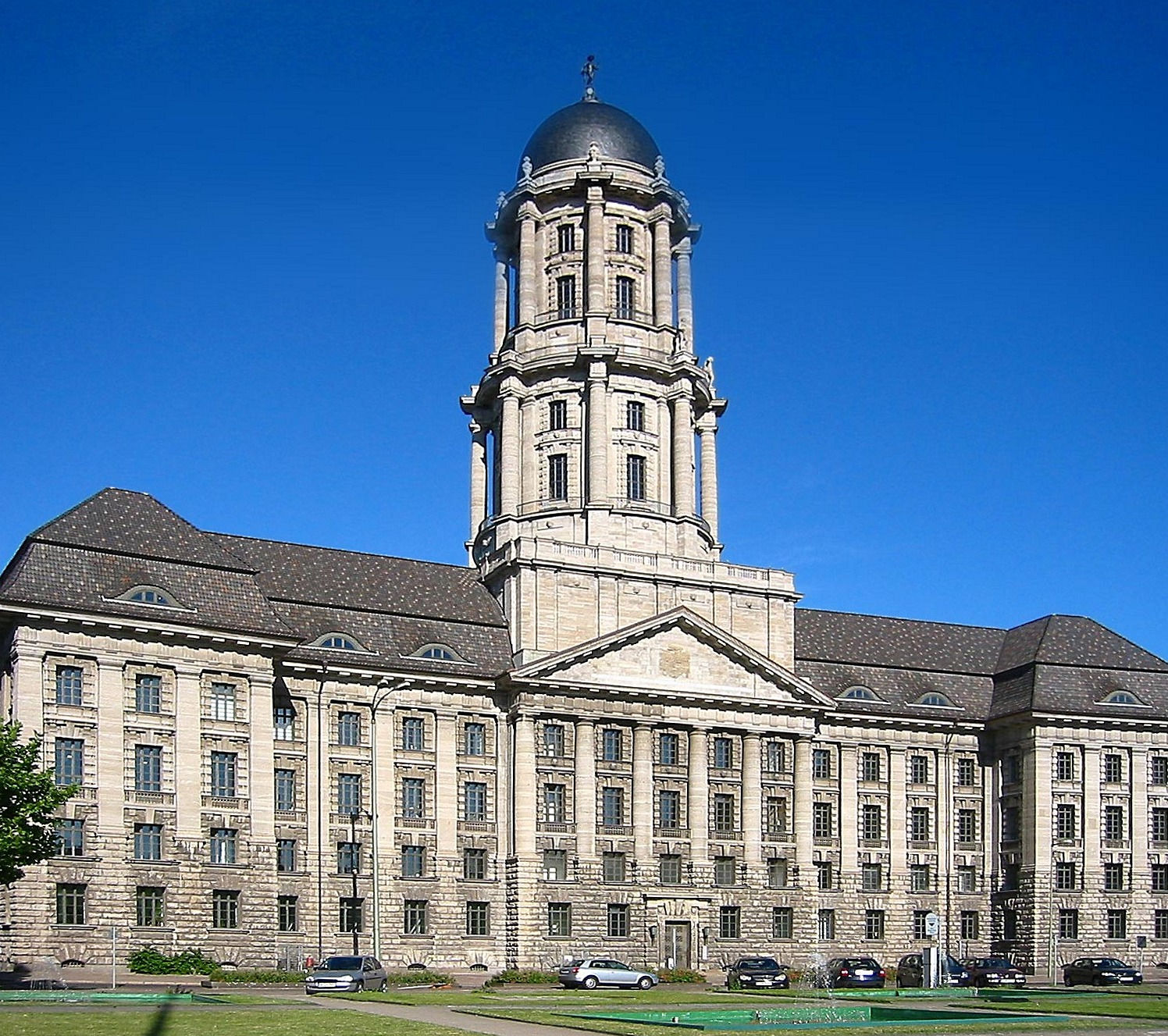
The Altes Stadthaus in Berlin, seat of the Ministerrat der DDR from 1961 until 1990

Until the Wende in the fall of 1989, the two first deputy chairmen were Werner Krolikowski and Alfred Neumann, who were both members of the SED Politbüro. Other deputy chairmen included the leaders of the four allied parties (Blockparteien). Additional members included the chairman of the State Planning Commission, the president of the Staatsbank der DDR (State Bank of the GDR) and some state secretaries, who were usually office directors at the Council. All members of the Council were selected by the GDR Volkskammer (parliament) for a term of five years. Within the centralized state structure of the GDR, the city, county and district administrations were subordinated to the Council.

Willi Stoph and his entire cabinet resigned on 7 November 1989. Stoph was succeeded by Hans Modrow. The SED gave up its monopoly of power on 1 December. Modrow continued in office, leading a cabinet with both SED/PDS and non-communist members. For much of the winter of 1989 and 1990, he was the de facto leader of East Germany. Modrow was succeeded by Lothar de Maizière after what turned out to be the only free election ever held in East Germany, in March 1990. The de Maizière cabinet presided over the transition period to the reunification of the two Germanies in October 1990.

The former Prussian state parliament (Preußischer Landtag) served as the seat of the Council from 1950 to 1953. From 1961 to 1990 the Council's offices were located in the former Old City Hall of Berlin at No. 47 Klosterstraße. The Law Gazette of the GDR (Gesetzblatt der DDR) was also published by the Council. In addition, the Council’s Press Office made official government announcements and was responsible for the accreditation of foreign journalists in the GDR.

The individual ministries had their own headquarters buildings in East Berlin, although the former Reich Air Ministry building on Leipziger Straße housed the industrially-oriented ministries.

== Chairmen of the Council of Ministers ==
No.	Portrait	Name (birth–death)	Term of office			Party	Volkskammer	Cabinet	Ref.
No.	Portrait	Name (birth–death)	Took office	Left office	Time in office	Party	Volkskammer	Cabinet	Ref.
Minister-President of the German Democratic Republic
1		Otto Grotewohl (1894–1964)	12 October 1949	8 December 1958 (office renamed)	9 years, 57 days	Socialist Unity Party	Provisional (1949)	Grotewohl I	
1		Otto Grotewohl (1894–1964)	12 October 1949	8 December 1958 (office renamed)	9 years, 57 days	Socialist Unity Party	1st (1950)	Grotewohl II	
1		Otto Grotewohl (1894–1964)	12 October 1949	8 December 1958 (office renamed)	9 years, 57 days	Socialist Unity Party	2nd (1954)	Grotewohl III	
Chairmen of the Council of Ministers of the German Democratic Republic
1		Otto Grotewohl (1894–1964)	8 December 1958	21 September 1964 #	5 years, 288 days	Socialist Unity Party	3rd (1958)	Grotewohl IV	
1		Otto Grotewohl (1894–1964)	8 December 1958	21 September 1964 #	5 years, 288 days	Socialist Unity Party	4th (1963)	Grotewohl V	
2		Willi Stoph (1914–1999)	21 September 1964	3 October 1973	9 years, 12 days	Socialist Unity Party	4th (1963)	Stoph I	
2		Willi Stoph (1914–1999)	21 September 1964	3 October 1973	9 years, 12 days	Socialist Unity Party	5th (1967)	Stoph II	
2		Willi Stoph (1914–1999)	21 September 1964	3 October 1973	9 years, 12 days	Socialist Unity Party	6th (1971)	Stoph III	
3		Horst Sindermann (1915–1990)	3 October 1973	29 October 1976	3 years, 26 days	Socialist Unity Party	6th (1971)	Sindermann	
(2)		Willi Stoph (1914–1999)	29 October 1976	13 November 1989	9 years, 12 days	Socialist Unity Party	7th (1976)	Stoph IV	
(2)		Willi Stoph (1914–1999)	29 October 1976	13 November 1989	9 years, 12 days	Socialist Unity Party	8th (1981)	Stoph V	
(2)		Willi Stoph (1914–1999)	29 October 1976	13 November 1989	9 years, 12 days	Socialist Unity Party	9th (1986)	Stoph VI	
4		Hans Modrow (1928–2023)	13 November 1989	12 April 1990	150 days	Socialist Unity Party	9th (1986)	Modrow	
Minister-President of the German Democratic Republic
5		Lothar de Maizière (born 1940)	12 April 1990	2 October 1990	173 days	Christian Democratic Union	10th (1990)	de Maizière	

=== Office of the Minister-President ===
The Minister-President, from 1958 onward Chairman of the Council of Ministers, was supported by a dedicated agency. Initially, this was the Government Chancellery, which on November 26, 1954, was replaced by the Office of the Presidium of the Council of Ministers. In 1962, the Office's title was shortened to Office of the Council of Ministers. The Office always answered directly to the Chairman of the Council of Ministers.

Heads with the rank of State Secretary (all SED members):

- Fritz Geyer (1949–1956)
- Anton Plenikowski (1956–1963)
- Rudolf Rost (1963–1975)

In early 1974, most of the responsibilities of the Office of the Council of Ministers were incorporated into a newly created Secretariat of the Council of Ministers, which was not subordinate to the then-Chairman Horst Sindermann, but rather to Günter Mittag, the First Deputy Chairman responsible for economic affairs. Mittag's control over most of the Council of Ministers' administrative affairs meant that his power eclipsed that of nominal Chairman Sindermann. The stripped-down Office of the Council of Ministers continued to exist for another year under its head, Rudolf Rost, alongside the Secretariat, after which it was abolished and its remaining duties were transferred to the Secretariat of the Council of Ministers.

Heads with the rank of State Secretary (all SED members):

- Kurt Kleinert (1974–1989)
- Harry Möbis (1989–1990)

On April 13, 1990, the Office of the Minister-President was established as the legal successor to the Secretariat of the Council of Ministers. This office was modeled after the West German Federal Chancellery in preparation for German reunification.

Head:

- Klaus Reichenbach (1990), Minister in the Office of the Minister President

The State Secretaries were Günther Krause (Task Force for German Unity), Lothar Moritz (Political and Basic Policy Affairs), Gottfried Klepel (Domestic and Economic Policy), Matthias Gehler (Government Spokesperson), and Almuth Berger (Commissioner for Foreigners).

== Ministries ==
Name of the ministry	Minister (party)	Term of office	Cabinet
Labor and Vocational Training (until 1954: Labor)	Roman Chwalek (SED)	1950–1953	1st Council of Ministers
Labor and Vocational Training (until 1954: Labor)	Friedrich Macher (SED)	1953–1958	1st Council of Ministers
Labor and Vocational Training (until 1954: Labor)	Friedrich Macher (SED)	1953–1958	2nd Council of Ministers
Guidance and Control of Bezirk and District Councils (until 1964: Deputy Chairman of the Council of Ministers"; from 1971: Working Group "Organization and Inspection")	Willi Stoph (SED)	1960–1964	3rd Council of Ministers
Guidance and Control of Bezirk and District Councils (until 1964: Deputy Chairman of the Council of Ministers"; from 1971: Working Group "Organization and Inspection")	Willi Stoph (SED)	1960–1964	4th Council of Ministers
Guidance and Control of Bezirk and District Councils (until 1964: Deputy Chairman of the Council of Ministers"; from 1971: Working Group "Organization and Inspection")	Kurt Seibt (SED)	1964–1965	4th Council of Ministers
Guidance and Control of Bezirk and District Councils (until 1964: Deputy Chairman of the Council of Ministers"; from 1971: Working Group "Organization and Inspection")	Fritz Scharfenstein (SED)	1965–1971	4th Council of Ministers
Guidance and Control of Bezirk and District Councils (until 1964: Deputy Chairman of the Council of Ministers"; from 1971: Working Group "Organization and Inspection")	Fritz Scharfenstein (SED)	1965–1971	5th Council of Ministers
Guidance and Control of Bezirk and District Councils (until 1964: Deputy Chairman of the Council of Ministers"; from 1971: Working Group "Organization and Inspection")	downgraded from minister to state secretary at the Chairman of the Council of Ministers		
Guidance and Control of Bezirk and District Councils (until 1964: Deputy Chairman of the Council of Ministers"; from 1971: Working Group "Organization and Inspection")	Harry Möbis (SED)	1971–1989	6th Council of Ministers
Guidance and Control of Bezirk and District Councils (until 1964: Deputy Chairman of the Council of Ministers"; from 1971: Working Group "Organization and Inspection")	Harry Möbis (SED)	1971–1989	7th Council of Ministers
Guidance and Control of Bezirk and District Councils (until 1964: Deputy Chairman of the Council of Ministers"; from 1971: Working Group "Organization and Inspection")	Harry Möbis (SED)	1971–1989	8th Council of Ministers
Guidance and Control of Bezirk and District Councils (until 1964: Deputy Chairman of the Council of Ministers"; from 1971: Working Group "Organization and Inspection")	Harry Möbis (SED)	1971–1989	9th Council of Ministers
Foreign Affairs	Georg Dertinger (CDU)	1949–1953	Provisional Government of the GDR
Foreign Affairs	Georg Dertinger (CDU)	1949–1953	1st Council of Ministers
Foreign Affairs	Lothar Bolz (NDPD)	1953–1965	1st Council of Ministers
Foreign Affairs	Lothar Bolz (NDPD)	1953–1965	2nd Council of Ministers
Foreign Affairs	Lothar Bolz (NDPD)	1953–1965	3rd Council of Ministers
Foreign Affairs	Lothar Bolz (NDPD)	1953–1965	4th Council of Ministers
Foreign Affairs	Otto Winzer (SED)	1965–1975†	4th Council of Ministers
Foreign Affairs	Otto Winzer (SED)	1965–1975†	5th Council of Ministers
Foreign Affairs	Otto Winzer (SED)	1965–1975†	6th Council of Ministers
Foreign Affairs	Oskar Fischer (SED)	1975–1990	6th Council of Ministers
Foreign Affairs	Oskar Fischer (SED)	1975–1990	7th Council of Ministers
Foreign Affairs	Oskar Fischer (SED)	1975–1990	8th Council of Ministers
Foreign Affairs	Oskar Fischer (SED)	1975–1990	9th Council of Ministers
Foreign Affairs	Oskar Fischer (SED)	1975–1990	Modrow government
Foreign Affairs	Markus Meckel (SPD)	1990	de Maizière government
Foreign Affairs	Lothar de Maizière (CDU) (acting)	1990	de Maizière government
Construction (until 1958: Reconstruction; 1989–1990: Construction and Housing; from 1990: Construction, Urban Development, and Housing)	Lothar Bolz (NDPD)	1949–1953	Provisional Government of the GDR
Construction (until 1958: Reconstruction; 1989–1990: Construction and Housing; from 1990: Construction, Urban Development, and Housing)	Lothar Bolz (NDPD)	1949–1953	1st Council of Ministers
Construction (until 1958: Reconstruction; 1989–1990: Construction and Housing; from 1990: Construction, Urban Development, and Housing)	Heinz Winkler (SED)	1953–1958	2nd Council of Ministers
Construction (until 1958: Reconstruction; 1989–1990: Construction and Housing; from 1990: Construction, Urban Development, and Housing)	Ernst Scholz (SED)	1958–1963	3rd Council of Ministers
Construction (until 1958: Reconstruction; 1989–1990: Construction and Housing; from 1990: Construction, Urban Development, and Housing)	Wolfgang Junker (SED)	1963–1989	4th Council of Ministers
Construction (until 1958: Reconstruction; 1989–1990: Construction and Housing; from 1990: Construction, Urban Development, and Housing)	Wolfgang Junker (SED)	1963–1989	5th Council of Ministers
Construction (until 1958: Reconstruction; 1989–1990: Construction and Housing; from 1990: Construction, Urban Development, and Housing)	Wolfgang Junker (SED)	1963–1989	6th Council of Ministers
Construction (until 1958: Reconstruction; 1989–1990: Construction and Housing; from 1990: Construction, Urban Development, and Housing)	Wolfgang Junker (SED)	1963–1989	7th Council of Ministers
Construction (until 1958: Reconstruction; 1989–1990: Construction and Housing; from 1990: Construction, Urban Development, and Housing)	Wolfgang Junker (SED)	1963–1989	8th Council of Ministers
Construction (until 1958: Reconstruction; 1989–1990: Construction and Housing; from 1990: Construction, Urban Development, and Housing)	Wolfgang Junker (SED)	1963–1989	9th Council of Ministers
Construction (until 1958: Reconstruction; 1989–1990: Construction and Housing; from 1990: Construction, Urban Development, and Housing)	Gerhard Baumgärtel (CDU)	1989–1990	Modrow government
Construction (until 1958: Reconstruction; 1989–1990: Construction and Housing; from 1990: Construction, Urban Development, and Housing)	Axel Viehweger (LDPD/FDP)	1990	de Maizière government
Finance (1989–1990: Finance and Prices)	Hans Loch (LDPD)	1949–1955	Provisional Government of the GDR
Finance (1989–1990: Finance and Prices)	Hans Loch (LDPD)	1949–1955	1st Council of Ministers
Finance (1989–1990: Finance and Prices)	Hans Loch (LDPD)	1949–1955	2nd Council of Ministers
Finance (1989–1990: Finance and Prices)	Willy Rumpf (SED)	1955–1966	2nd Council of Ministers
Finance (1989–1990: Finance and Prices)	Willy Rumpf (SED)	1955–1966	3rd Council of Ministers
Finance (1989–1990: Finance and Prices)	Willy Rumpf (SED)	1955–1966	4th Council of Ministers
Finance (1989–1990: Finance and Prices)	Siegfried Böhm (SED)	1966–1980†	4th Council of Ministers
Finance (1989–1990: Finance and Prices)	Siegfried Böhm (SED)	1966–1980†	5th Council of Ministers
Finance (1989–1990: Finance and Prices)	Siegfried Böhm (SED)	1966–1980†	6th Council of Ministers
Finance (1989–1990: Finance and Prices)	Siegfried Böhm (SED)	1966–1980†	7th Council of Ministers
Finance (1989–1990: Finance and Prices)	Werner Schmieder (SED)	1980–1981	7th Council of Ministers
Finance (1989–1990: Finance and Prices)	Ernst Höfner (SED)	1981–1989	8th Council of Ministers
Finance (1989–1990: Finance and Prices)	Ernst Höfner (SED)	1981–1989	9th Council of Ministers
Finance (1989–1990: Finance and Prices)	Uta Nickel (SED-PDS)	1989–1990	Modrow government
Finance (1989–1990: Finance and Prices)	Walter Siegert (SED-PDS) (acting)	1990	Modrow government
Finance (1989–1990: Finance and Prices)	Walter Romberg (SPD)	1990	de Maizière government
Finance (1989–1990: Finance and Prices)	Werner Skowron (CDU) (acting)	1990	de Maizière government
Transport	Hans Reingruber (Cultural Association of the GDR)	1949–1953	Provisional Government of the GDR
Transport	Hans Reingruber (Cultural Association of the GDR)	1949–1953	1st Council of Ministers
Transport	Erwin Kramer (SED) also General Director of the Deutsche Reichsbahn	1954–1970	
Transport	Erwin Kramer (SED) also General Director of the Deutsche Reichsbahn	1954–1970	2nd Council of Ministers
Transport	Erwin Kramer (SED) also General Director of the Deutsche Reichsbahn	1954–1970	3rd Council of Ministers
Transport	Erwin Kramer (SED) also General Director of the Deutsche Reichsbahn	1954–1970	4th Council of Ministers
Transport	Erwin Kramer (SED) also General Director of the Deutsche Reichsbahn	1954–1970	5th Council of Ministers
Transport	Otto Arndt (SED) also General Director of the Deutsche Reichsbahn	1970–1989	5th Council of Ministers
Transport	Otto Arndt (SED) also General Director of the Deutsche Reichsbahn	1970–1989	6th Council of Ministers
Transport	Otto Arndt (SED) also General Director of the Deutsche Reichsbahn	1970–1989	7th Council of Ministers
Transport	Otto Arndt (SED) also General Director of the Deutsche Reichsbahn	1970–1989	8th Council of Ministers
Transport	Otto Arndt (SED) also General Director of the Deutsche Reichsbahn	1970–1989	9th Council of Ministers
Transport	Heinrich Scholz (SED) also General Director of the Deutsche Reichsbahn	1989–1990	Modrow government
Transport	Herbert Keddi (SED-PDS)	1990	Modrow government
Transport	Horst Gebenner (CDU)	1990	de Maizière government
Posts and Telecommunications	Friedrich Burmeister (CDU)	1949–1963	Provisional Government of the GDR
Posts and Telecommunications	Friedrich Burmeister (CDU)	1949–1963	1st Council of Ministers
Posts and Telecommunications	Friedrich Burmeister (CDU)	1949–1963	2nd Council of Ministers
Posts and Telecommunications	Friedrich Burmeister (CDU)	1949–1963	3rd Council of Ministers
Posts and Telecommunications	Rudolph Schulze (CDU)	1963–1989	4th Council of Ministers
Posts and Telecommunications	Rudolph Schulze (CDU)	1963–1989	5th Council of Ministers
Posts and Telecommunications	Rudolph Schulze (CDU)	1963–1989	6th Council of Ministers
Posts and Telecommunications	Rudolph Schulze (CDU)	1963–1989	7th Council of Ministers
Posts and Telecommunications	Rudolph Schulze (CDU)	1963–1989	8th Council of Ministers
Posts and Telecommunications	Rudolph Schulze (CDU)	1963–1989	9th Council of Ministers
Posts and Telecommunications	Klaus Wolf (CDU)	1989–1990	Modrow government
Posts and Telecommunications	Emil Schnell (SPD)	1990	de Maizière government
Posts and Telecommunications	Hans-Jürgen Niehof (FDP) (acting)	1990	de Maizière government
Culture	Johannes R. Becher (SED)	1954–1958†	2nd Council of Ministers
Culture	Alexander Abusch (SED)	1958–1961	3rd Council of Ministers
Culture	Hans Bentzien (SED)	1961–1965	3rd Council of Ministers
Culture	Hans Bentzien (SED)	1961–1965	4th Council of Ministers
Culture	Klaus Gysi (SED)	1966–1973	4th Council of Ministers
Culture	Klaus Gysi (SED)	1966–1973	5th Council of Ministers
Culture	Klaus Gysi (SED)	1966–1973	6th Council of Ministers
Culture	Hans-Joachim Hoffmann (SED)	1973–1989	6th Council of Ministers
Culture	Hans-Joachim Hoffmann (SED)	1973–1989	7th Council of Ministers
Culture	Hans-Joachim Hoffmann (SED)	1973–1989	8th Council of Ministers
Culture	Hans-Joachim Hoffmann (SED)	1973–1989	9th Council of Ministers
Culture	Dietmar Keller (SED-PDS)	1989–1990	Modrow government
Culture	Herbert Schirmer (CDU)	1990	de Maizière government
Church Affairs (1957–1989: State Secretariat for Church Affairs)	Werner Eggerath (SED)	1957–1960	2nd Council of Ministers
Church Affairs (1957–1989: State Secretariat for Church Affairs)	Werner Eggerath (SED)	1957–1960	3rd Council of Ministers
Church Affairs (1957–1989: State Secretariat for Church Affairs)	Hans Seigewasser (SED)	1960–1979†	3rd Council of Ministers
Church Affairs (1957–1989: State Secretariat for Church Affairs)	Hans Seigewasser (SED)	1960–1979†	4th Council of Ministers
Church Affairs (1957–1989: State Secretariat for Church Affairs)	Hans Seigewasser (SED)	1960–1979†	5th Council of Ministers
Church Affairs (1957–1989: State Secretariat for Church Affairs)	Hans Seigewasser (SED)	1960–1979†	6th Council of Ministers
Church Affairs (1957–1989: State Secretariat for Church Affairs)	Hans Seigewasser (SED)	1960–1979†	7th Council of Ministers
Church Affairs (1957–1989: State Secretariat for Church Affairs)	Klaus Gysi (SED)	1979–1988	7th Council of Ministers
Church Affairs (1957–1989: State Secretariat for Church Affairs)	Klaus Gysi (SED)	1979–1988	8th Council of Ministers
Church Affairs (1957–1989: State Secretariat for Church Affairs)	Klaus Gysi (SED)	1979–1988	9th Council of Ministers
Church Affairs (1957–1989: State Secretariat for Church Affairs)	Kurt Löffler (SED)	1988–1989	9th Council of Ministers
Church Affairs (1957–1989: State Secretariat for Church Affairs)	upgraded from state secretary to minister		
Church Affairs (1957–1989: State Secretariat for Church Affairs)	Lothar de Maizière (CDU)	1989–1990	Modrow government
Church Affairs (1957–1989: State Secretariat for Church Affairs)	dissolved to new Minister-President's Office		
Agriculture, Forestry and Food (until 1963: Agriculture and Forestry; 1963–1968: Agricultural Council; 1968–1971: Council for Agricultural Production and Food Economy)	Ernst Goldenbaum (DBD)	1949–1950	Provisional Government of the GDR
Agriculture, Forestry and Food (until 1963: Agriculture and Forestry; 1963–1968: Agricultural Council; 1968–1971: Council for Agricultural Production and Food Economy)	Paul Scholz (DBD)	1950–1952	1st Council of Ministers
Agriculture, Forestry and Food (until 1963: Agriculture and Forestry; 1963–1968: Agricultural Council; 1968–1971: Council for Agricultural Production and Food Economy)	Wilhelm Schröder (DBD)	1952–1953	1st Council of Ministers
Agriculture, Forestry and Food (until 1963: Agriculture and Forestry; 1963–1968: Agricultural Council; 1968–1971: Council for Agricultural Production and Food Economy)	Hans Reichelt (DBD)	1953	1st Council of Ministers
Agriculture, Forestry and Food (until 1963: Agriculture and Forestry; 1963–1968: Agricultural Council; 1968–1971: Council for Agricultural Production and Food Economy)	Paul Scholz (DBD)	1953–1955	1st Council of Ministers
Agriculture, Forestry and Food (until 1963: Agriculture and Forestry; 1963–1968: Agricultural Council; 1968–1971: Council for Agricultural Production and Food Economy)	Paul Scholz (DBD)	1953–1955	2nd Council of Ministers
Agriculture, Forestry and Food (until 1963: Agriculture and Forestry; 1963–1968: Agricultural Council; 1968–1971: Council for Agricultural Production and Food Economy)	Hans Reichelt (DBD)	1955–1963	2nd Council of Ministers
Agriculture, Forestry and Food (until 1963: Agriculture and Forestry; 1963–1968: Agricultural Council; 1968–1971: Council for Agricultural Production and Food Economy)	Hans Reichelt (DBD)	1955–1963	3rd Council of Ministers
Agriculture, Forestry and Food (until 1963: Agriculture and Forestry; 1963–1968: Agricultural Council; 1968–1971: Council for Agricultural Production and Food Economy)	Karl-Heinz Bartsch (SED)	1963	3rd Council of Ministers
Agriculture, Forestry and Food (until 1963: Agriculture and Forestry; 1963–1968: Agricultural Council; 1968–1971: Council for Agricultural Production and Food Economy)	Georg Ewald (SED)	1963–1973†	3rd Council of Ministers
Agriculture, Forestry and Food (until 1963: Agriculture and Forestry; 1963–1968: Agricultural Council; 1968–1971: Council for Agricultural Production and Food Economy)	Georg Ewald (SED)	1963–1973†	4th Council of Ministers
Agriculture, Forestry and Food (until 1963: Agriculture and Forestry; 1963–1968: Agricultural Council; 1968–1971: Council for Agricultural Production and Food Economy)	Georg Ewald (SED)	1963–1973†	5th Council of Ministers
Agriculture, Forestry and Food (until 1963: Agriculture and Forestry; 1963–1968: Agricultural Council; 1968–1971: Council for Agricultural Production and Food Economy)	Georg Ewald (SED)	1963–1973†	6th Council of Ministers
Agriculture, Forestry and Food (until 1963: Agriculture and Forestry; 1963–1968: Agricultural Council; 1968–1971: Council for Agricultural Production and Food Economy)	Heinz Kuhrig (SED)	1973–1982	6th Council of Ministers
Agriculture, Forestry and Food (until 1963: Agriculture and Forestry; 1963–1968: Agricultural Council; 1968–1971: Council for Agricultural Production and Food Economy)	Heinz Kuhrig (SED)	1973–1982	7th Council of Ministers
Agriculture, Forestry and Food (until 1963: Agriculture and Forestry; 1963–1968: Agricultural Council; 1968–1971: Council for Agricultural Production and Food Economy)	Heinz Kuhrig (SED)	1973–1982	8th Council of Ministers
Agriculture, Forestry and Food (until 1963: Agriculture and Forestry; 1963–1968: Agricultural Council; 1968–1971: Council for Agricultural Production and Food Economy)	Bruno Lietz (SED)	1982–1989	8th Council of Ministers
Agriculture, Forestry and Food (until 1963: Agriculture and Forestry; 1963–1968: Agricultural Council; 1968–1971: Council for Agricultural Production and Food Economy)	Bruno Lietz (SED)	1982–1989	9th Council of Ministers
Agriculture, Forestry and Food (until 1963: Agriculture and Forestry; 1963–1968: Agricultural Council; 1968–1971: Council for Agricultural Production and Food Economy)	Hans Watzek (DBD)	1989–1990	Modrow government
Agriculture, Forestry and Food (until 1963: Agriculture and Forestry; 1963–1968: Agricultural Council; 1968–1971: Council for Agricultural Production and Food Economy)	Peter Pollack (independent/SPD)	1990	de Maizière government
Agriculture, Forestry and Food (until 1963: Agriculture and Forestry; 1963–1968: Agricultural Council; 1968–1971: Council for Agricultural Production and Food Economy)	Peter Kauffold (SPD)	1990	de Maizière government
Agriculture, Forestry and Food (until 1963: Agriculture and Forestry; 1963–1968: Agricultural Council; 1968–1971: Council for Agricultural Production and Food Economy)	Gottfried Haschke (CDU) (acting)	1990	de Maizière government
People's Education (until 1950: People's Education and Youth; from 1989: Education and Youth)	Paul Wandel (SED)	1949–1952	Provisional Government of the GDR
People's Education (until 1950: People's Education and Youth; from 1989: Education and Youth)	Paul Wandel (SED)	1949–1952	1st Council of Ministers
People's Education (until 1950: People's Education and Youth; from 1989: Education and Youth)	Elisabeth Zaisser (SED)	1952–1954	1st Council of Ministers
People's Education (until 1950: People's Education and Youth; from 1989: Education and Youth)	Fritz Lange (SED)	1954–1958	2nd Council of Ministers
People's Education (until 1950: People's Education and Youth; from 1989: Education and Youth)	Alfred Lemmnitz (SED)	1958–1963	3rd Council of Ministers
People's Education (until 1950: People's Education and Youth; from 1989: Education and Youth)	Margot Honecker (SED)	1963–1989	4th Council of Ministers
People's Education (until 1950: People's Education and Youth; from 1989: Education and Youth)	Margot Honecker (SED)	1963–1989	5th Council of Ministers
People's Education (until 1950: People's Education and Youth; from 1989: Education and Youth)	Margot Honecker (SED)	1963–1989	6th Council of Ministers
People's Education (until 1950: People's Education and Youth; from 1989: Education and Youth)	Margot Honecker (SED)	1963–1989	7th Council of Ministers
People's Education (until 1950: People's Education and Youth; from 1989: Education and Youth)	Margot Honecker (SED)	1963–1989	8th Council of Ministers
People's Education (until 1950: People's Education and Youth; from 1989: Education and Youth)	Margot Honecker (SED)	1963–1989	9th Council of Ministers
People's Education (until 1950: People's Education and Youth; from 1989: Education and Youth)	Günther Fuchs (SED) (acting)	1989	9th Council of Ministers
People's Education (until 1950: People's Education and Youth; from 1989: Education and Youth)	Hans-Heinz Emons (SED-PDS)	1989–1990	Modrow government
People's Education (until 1950: People's Education and Youth; from 1989: Education and Youth)	dissolved to new Ministry of Education and Science		
Higher and Technical Education (1951–1958: State Secretariat for Higher Education; 1958–1967: State Secretariat for Higher and Technical Education)	Gerhard Harig (SED)	1951–1957	1st Council of Ministers
Higher and Technical Education (1951–1958: State Secretariat for Higher Education; 1958–1967: State Secretariat for Higher and Technical Education)	Gerhard Harig (SED)	1951–1957	2nd Council of Ministers
Higher and Technical Education (1951–1958: State Secretariat for Higher Education; 1958–1967: State Secretariat for Higher and Technical Education)	Wilhelm Girnus (SED)	1957–1962	2nd Council of Ministers
Higher and Technical Education (1951–1958: State Secretariat for Higher Education; 1958–1967: State Secretariat for Higher and Technical Education)	Wilhelm Girnus (SED)	1957–1962	3rd Council of Ministers
Higher and Technical Education (1951–1958: State Secretariat for Higher Education; 1958–1967: State Secretariat for Higher and Technical Education)	Ernst-Joachim Gießmann (SED)	1962–1967	3rd Council of Ministers
Higher and Technical Education (1951–1958: State Secretariat for Higher Education; 1958–1967: State Secretariat for Higher and Technical Education)	Ernst-Joachim Gießmann (SED)	1962–1967	4th Council of Ministers
Higher and Technical Education (1951–1958: State Secretariat for Higher Education; 1958–1967: State Secretariat for Higher and Technical Education)	upgraded from state secretary to minister		
Higher and Technical Education (1951–1958: State Secretariat for Higher Education; 1958–1967: State Secretariat for Higher and Technical Education)	Ernst-Joachim Gießmann (SED)	1967–1970	5th Council of Ministers
Higher and Technical Education (1951–1958: State Secretariat for Higher Education; 1958–1967: State Secretariat for Higher and Technical Education)	Hans-Joachim Böhme (SED)	1970–1989	5th Council of Ministers
Higher and Technical Education (1951–1958: State Secretariat for Higher Education; 1958–1967: State Secretariat for Higher and Technical Education)	Hans-Joachim Böhme (SED)	1970–1989	6th Council of Ministers
Higher and Technical Education (1951–1958: State Secretariat for Higher Education; 1958–1967: State Secretariat for Higher and Technical Education)	Hans-Joachim Böhme (SED)	1970–1989	7th Council of Ministers
Higher and Technical Education (1951–1958: State Secretariat for Higher Education; 1958–1967: State Secretariat for Higher and Technical Education)	Hans-Joachim Böhme (SED)	1970–1989	8th Council of Ministers
Higher and Technical Education (1951–1958: State Secretariat for Higher Education; 1958–1967: State Secretariat for Higher and Technical Education)	Hans-Joachim Böhme (SED)	1970–1989	9th Council of Ministers
Higher and Technical Education (1951–1958: State Secretariat for Higher Education; 1958–1967: State Secretariat for Higher and Technical Education)	dissolved to Ministry of Education and Youth		
Science and Technology (from 1990: Research and Technology)	Herbert Weiz (SED)	1974–1989	6th Council of Ministers
Science and Technology (from 1990: Research and Technology)	Herbert Weiz (SED)	1974–1989	7th Council of Ministers
Science and Technology (from 1990: Research and Technology)	Herbert Weiz (SED)	1974–1989	8th Council of Ministers
Science and Technology (from 1990: Research and Technology)	Herbert Weiz (SED)	1974–1989	9th Council of Ministers
Science and Technology (from 1990: Research and Technology)	Peter-Klaus Budig (LDPD)	1989–1990	Modrow government
Science and Technology (from 1990: Research and Technology)	Frank Terpe (SPD)	1990	de Maizière government
Science and Technology (from 1990: Research and Technology)	Hans Joachim Meyer (CDU) (acting)	1990	de Maizière government
Health (until 1958: Labor and Health; 1989 to 1990: Health and Social Affairs)	Luitpold Steidle (CDU)	1949–1958	Provisional Government of the GDR
Health (until 1958: Labor and Health; 1989 to 1990: Health and Social Affairs)	Luitpold Steidle (CDU)	1949–1958	1st Council of Ministers
Health (until 1958: Labor and Health; 1989 to 1990: Health and Social Affairs)	Luitpold Steidle (CDU)	1949–1958	2nd Council of Ministers
Health (until 1958: Labor and Health; 1989 to 1990: Health and Social Affairs)	Max Sefrin (CDU)	1958–1971	3rd Council of Ministers
Health (until 1958: Labor and Health; 1989 to 1990: Health and Social Affairs)	Max Sefrin (CDU)	1958–1971	4th Council of Ministers
Health (until 1958: Labor and Health; 1989 to 1990: Health and Social Affairs)	Max Sefrin (CDU)	1958–1971	5th Council of Ministers
Health (until 1958: Labor and Health; 1989 to 1990: Health and Social Affairs)	Ludwig Mecklinger (SED)	1971–1988	6th Council of Ministers
Health (until 1958: Labor and Health; 1989 to 1990: Health and Social Affairs)	Ludwig Mecklinger (SED)	1971–1988	7th Council of Ministers
Health (until 1958: Labor and Health; 1989 to 1990: Health and Social Affairs)	Ludwig Mecklinger (SED)	1971–1988	8th Council of Ministers
Health (until 1958: Labor and Health; 1989 to 1990: Health and Social Affairs)	Ludwig Mecklinger (SED)	1971–1988	9th Council of Ministers
Health (until 1958: Labor and Health; 1989 to 1990: Health and Social Affairs)	Klaus Thielmann (SED-PDS)	1989–1990	9th Council of Ministers
Health (until 1958: Labor and Health; 1989 to 1990: Health and Social Affairs)	Klaus Thielmann (SED-PDS)	1989–1990	Modrow government
Health (until 1958: Labor and Health; 1989 to 1990: Health and Social Affairs)	Jürgen Kleditzsch (CDU)	1990	de Maizière government
Geology (1967–1974: State Secretariat for Geology)	Manfred Bochmann (SED)	1967–1974	5th Council of Ministers
Geology (1967–1974: State Secretariat for Geology)	Manfred Bochmann (SED)	1967–1974	6th Council of Ministers
Geology (1967–1974: State Secretariat for Geology)	upgraded from state secretary to minister		
Geology (1967–1974: State Secretariat for Geology)	Manfred Bochmann (SED)	1974–1989	6th Council of Ministers
Geology (1967–1974: State Secretariat for Geology)	Manfred Bochmann (SED)	1974–1989	7th Council of Ministers
Geology (1967–1974: State Secretariat for Geology)	Manfred Bochmann (SED)	1974–1989	8th Council of Ministers
Geology (1967–1974: State Secretariat for Geology)	Manfred Bochmann (SED)	1974–1989	9th Council of Ministers
Geology (1967–1974: State Secretariat for Geology)	dissolved to new Ministry of Heavy Industry		
Environmental Protection and Water Management (from 1990: Environmental and Nature Conservation, Reactor Safety and Energy)	Werner Titel (DBD)	1971†	6th Council of Ministers
Environmental Protection and Water Management (from 1990: Environmental and Nature Conservation, Reactor Safety and Energy)	Hans Reichelt (DBD)	1972–1990	6th Council of Ministers
Environmental Protection and Water Management (from 1990: Environmental and Nature Conservation, Reactor Safety and Energy)	Hans Reichelt (DBD)	1972–1990	7th Ministerrat
Environmental Protection and Water Management (from 1990: Environmental and Nature Conservation, Reactor Safety and Energy)	Hans Reichelt (DBD)	1972–1990	8th Council of Ministers
Environmental Protection and Water Management (from 1990: Environmental and Nature Conservation, Reactor Safety and Energy)	Hans Reichelt (DBD)	1972–1990	9th Council of Ministers
Environmental Protection and Water Management (from 1990: Environmental and Nature Conservation, Reactor Safety and Energy)	Hans Reichelt (DBD)	1972–1990	Modrow government
Environmental Protection and Water Management (from 1990: Environmental and Nature Conservation, Reactor Safety and Energy)	Peter Diederich (DBD)	1990	Modrow government
Environmental Protection and Water Management (from 1990: Environmental and Nature Conservation, Reactor Safety and Energy)	Karl-Hermann Steinberg (CDU)	1990	de Maizière government
Trade and Supply	Karl Hamann (LDPD)	1949–1952	Provisional Government of the GDR
Trade and Supply	Karl Hamann (LDPD)	1949–1952	1st Council of Ministers
Trade and Supply	Curt Wach (SED)	1953–1959	1st Council of Ministers
Trade and Supply	Curt Wach (SED)	1953–1959	2nd Council of Ministers
Trade and Supply	Curt Wach (SED)	1953–1959	3rd Council of Ministers
Trade and Supply	Curt-Heinz Merkel (SED)	1959–1963	3rd Council of Ministers
Trade and Supply	Gerhard Lucht (SED)	1963–1965	4th Council of Ministers
Trade and Supply	Günter Sieber (SED)	1965–1972	4th Council of Ministers
Trade and Supply	Günter Sieber (SED)	1965–1972	5th Council of Ministers
Trade and Supply	Günter Sieber (SED)	1965–1972	6th Council of Ministers
Trade and Supply	Gerhard Briksa (SED)	1972–1989	6th Council of Ministers
Trade and Supply	Gerhard Briksa (SED)	1972–1989	7th Council of Ministers
Trade and Supply	Gerhard Briksa (SED)	1972–1989	8th Council of Ministers
Trade and Supply	Gerhard Briksa (SED)	1972–1989	9th Council of Ministers
Trade and Supply	Manfred Flegel (NDPD)	1989–1990	Modrow government
Foreign Trade	Georg Ulrich Handke (SED)	1949–1952	Provisional Government of the GDR
Foreign Trade	Georg Ulrich Handke (SED)	1949–1952	1st Council of Ministers
Foreign Trade	Kurt Gregor (SED)	1952–1954	1st Council of Ministers
Foreign Trade	Heinrich Rau (SED)	1955–1961†	2nd Council of Ministers
Foreign Trade	Heinrich Rau (SED)	1955–1961†	3rd Council of Ministers
Foreign Trade	Julius Balkow (SED)	1961–1965	3rd Council of Ministers
Foreign Trade	Julius Balkow (SED)	1961–1965	4th Council of Ministers
Foreign Trade	Horst Sölle (SED)	1965–1986	4th Council of Ministers
Foreign Trade	Horst Sölle (SED)	1965–1986	5th Council of Ministers
Foreign Trade	Horst Sölle (SED)	1965–1986	6th Council of Ministers
Foreign Trade	Horst Sölle (SED)	1965–1986	7th Council of Ministers
Foreign Trade	Horst Sölle (SED)	1965–1986	8th Council of Ministers
Foreign Trade	Gerhard Beil (SED)	1986–1990	9th Council of Ministers
Foreign Trade	Gerhard Beil (SED)	1986–1990	Modrow government
Justice	Max Fechner (SED)	1949–1953	Provisional Government of the GDR
Justice	Max Fechner (SED)	1949–1953	1st Council of Ministers
Justice	Hilde Benjamin (SED)	1953–1967	1st Council of Ministers
Justice	Hilde Benjamin (SED)	1953–1967	2nd Council of Ministers
Justice	Hilde Benjamin (SED)	1953–1967	3rd Council of Ministers
Justice	Hilde Benjamin (SED)	1953–1967	4th Council of Ministers
Justice	Kurt Wünsche (LDPD)	1967–1972	5th Council of Ministers
Justice	Kurt Wünsche (LDPD)	1967–1972	6th Council of Ministers
Justice	Hans-Joachim Heusinger (LDPD)	1972–1990	6th Council of Ministers
Justice	Hans-Joachim Heusinger (LDPD)	1972–1990	7th Council of Ministers
Justice	Hans-Joachim Heusinger (LDPD)	1972–1990	8th Council of Ministers
Justice	Hans-Joachim Heusinger (LDPD)	1972–1990	9th Council of Ministers
Justice	Hans-Joachim Heusinger (LDPD)	1972–1990	Modrow government
Justice	Kurt Wünsche (LDPD/FDP)	1990	Modrow government
Justice	Kurt Wünsche (LDPD/FDP)	1990	de Maizière government
Justice	Manfred Walther (CDU) (acting)	1990	de Maizière government
Minister-President's Office (1949–1954: Government Chancellery; 1954–1962: Office of the Presidium of the Council of Ministers; 1962–1974: Office of the Council of Ministers; 1974–1990: Secretariat of the Council of Ministers)	Rudi Geyer (SED)	1949–1956	1st Council of Ministers
Minister-President's Office (1949–1954: Government Chancellery; 1954–1962: Office of the Presidium of the Council of Ministers; 1962–1974: Office of the Council of Ministers; 1974–1990: Secretariat of the Council of Ministers)	Rudi Geyer (SED)	1949–1956	2nd Council of Ministers
Minister-President's Office (1949–1954: Government Chancellery; 1954–1962: Office of the Presidium of the Council of Ministers; 1962–1974: Office of the Council of Ministers; 1974–1990: Secretariat of the Council of Ministers)	Anton Plenikowski (SED)	1956–1963	2nd Council of Ministers
Minister-President's Office (1949–1954: Government Chancellery; 1954–1962: Office of the Presidium of the Council of Ministers; 1962–1974: Office of the Council of Ministers; 1974–1990: Secretariat of the Council of Ministers)	Anton Plenikowski (SED)	1956–1963	3rd Council of Ministers
Minister-President's Office (1949–1954: Government Chancellery; 1954–1962: Office of the Presidium of the Council of Ministers; 1962–1974: Office of the Council of Ministers; 1974–1990: Secretariat of the Council of Ministers)	Rudolf Rost (SED)	1963–1975	4th Council of Ministers
Minister-President's Office (1949–1954: Government Chancellery; 1954–1962: Office of the Presidium of the Council of Ministers; 1962–1974: Office of the Council of Ministers; 1974–1990: Secretariat of the Council of Ministers)	Rudolf Rost (SED)	1963–1975	5th Council of Ministers
Minister-President's Office (1949–1954: Government Chancellery; 1954–1962: Office of the Presidium of the Council of Ministers; 1962–1974: Office of the Council of Ministers; 1974–1990: Secretariat of the Council of Ministers)	Rudolf Rost (SED)	1963–1975	6th Council of Ministers
Minister-President's Office (1949–1954: Government Chancellery; 1954–1962: Office of the Presidium of the Council of Ministers; 1962–1974: Office of the Council of Ministers; 1974–1990: Secretariat of the Council of Ministers)	Kurt Kleinert (SED)	1974–1989	6th Council of Ministers
Minister-President's Office (1949–1954: Government Chancellery; 1954–1962: Office of the Presidium of the Council of Ministers; 1962–1974: Office of the Council of Ministers; 1974–1990: Secretariat of the Council of Ministers)	Kurt Kleinert (SED)	1974–1989	7th Council of Ministers
Minister-President's Office (1949–1954: Government Chancellery; 1954–1962: Office of the Presidium of the Council of Ministers; 1962–1974: Office of the Council of Ministers; 1974–1990: Secretariat of the Council of Ministers)	Kurt Kleinert (SED)	1974–1989	8th Council of Ministers
Minister-President's Office (1949–1954: Government Chancellery; 1954–1962: Office of the Presidium of the Council of Ministers; 1962–1974: Office of the Council of Ministers; 1974–1990: Secretariat of the Council of Ministers)	Kurt Kleinert (SED)	1974–1989	9th Council of Ministers
Minister-President's Office (1949–1954: Government Chancellery; 1954–1962: Office of the Presidium of the Council of Ministers; 1962–1974: Office of the Council of Ministers; 1974–1990: Secretariat of the Council of Ministers)	Harry Möbis (SED)	1989–1990	Modrow government
Minister-President's Office (1949–1954: Government Chancellery; 1954–1962: Office of the Presidium of the Council of Ministers; 1962–1974: Office of the Council of Ministers; 1974–1990: Secretariat of the Council of Ministers)	upgraded from state secretary to minister		
Minister-President's Office (1949–1954: Government Chancellery; 1954–1962: Office of the Presidium of the Council of Ministers; 1962–1974: Office of the Council of Ministers; 1974–1990: Secretariat of the Council of Ministers)	Klaus Reichenbach (CDU)	1990	de Maizière government

=== New Ministries from 1989/1990 ===
Name of the ministry	Minister	Term of office	Cabinet
Mechanical Engineering	Karl Grünheid (SED-PDS)	1989–1990	Modrow government
Mechanical Engineering	Hans-Joachim Lauck (SED-PDS)	1990	Modrow government
Mechanical Engineering	dissolved to Ministry of Economy		
Heavy Industry	Kurt Singhuber (SED-PDS)	1989–1990	Modrow government
Heavy Industry	dissolved to Ministry of Economy		
Economy	Christa Luft (SED-PDS)	1989–1990	Modrow government
Economy	Gerhard Pohl (CDU)	1990	de Maizière government
Economy	Gunter Halm (LDPD/FDP) (acting)	1990	de Maizière government
Tourism	Bruno Benthien (LDPD)	1989–1990	Modrow government
Tourism	Sybille Reider (SPD)	1990	de Maizière government
Tourism	Lothar Engel (independent) (acting)	1990	de Maizière government
Labor and Wages (from 1990: Labor and Social Affairs)	Hannelore Mensch (SED-PDS)	1989–1990	Modrow government
Labor and Wages (from 1990: Labor and Social Affairs)	Regine Hildebrandt (SPD)	1990	de Maizière government
Labor and Wages (from 1990: Labor and Social Affairs)	Jürgen Kleditzsch (CDU) (acting)	1990	de Maizière government
Family and Women	Christa Schmidt (CDU)	1990	de Maizière government
Education and Science	Hans Joachim Meyer (CDU)	1990	de Maizière government
Youth and Sports	Cordula Schubert (CDU)	1990	de Maizière government
Media Policy	Gottfried Müller (CDU)	1990	de Maizière government
Economic Cooperation	Hans-Wilhelm Ebeling (DSU/CDU)	1990	de Maizière government

=== Ministries of the armed forces ===
Name of the ministry	Minister (party)	Term of office	Cabinet
Interior	Karl Steinhoff (SED)	1949–1952	Provisional Government of the GDR
Interior	Karl Steinhoff (SED)	1949–1952	1st Council of Ministers
Interior	Willi Stoph (SED)	1952–1955	1st Council of Ministers
Interior	Willi Stoph (SED)	1952–1955	2nd Council of Ministers
Interior	Karl Maron (SED)	1955–1963	2nd Council of Ministers
Interior	Karl Maron (SED)	1955–1963	3rd Council of Ministers
Interior	Friedrich Dickel (SED)	1963–1989	4th Council of Ministers
Interior	Friedrich Dickel (SED)	1963–1989	5th Council of Ministers
Interior	Friedrich Dickel (SED)	1963–1989	6th Council of Ministers
Interior	Friedrich Dickel (SED)	1963–1989	7th Council of Ministers
Interior	Friedrich Dickel (SED)	1963–1989	8th Council of Ministers
Interior	Friedrich Dickel (SED)	1963–1989	9th Council of Ministers
Interior	Lothar Ahrendt (SED-PDS)	1989–1990	Modrow government
Interior	Peter-Michael Diestel (DSU/CDU)	1990	de Maizière government
State Security (1953–1955: State Secretariat for State Security; since 1989: Office for National Security)	split from Ministry of the Interior (Head Office for the Protection of the National Economy)		
State Security (1953–1955: State Secretariat for State Security; since 1989: Office for National Security)	Wilhelm Zaisser (SED)	1950–1953	1st Council of Ministers
State Security (1953–1955: State Secretariat for State Security; since 1989: Office for National Security)	downgraded from minister to state secretary in the Ministry of Interior		
State Security (1953–1955: State Secretariat for State Security; since 1989: Office for National Security)	Ernst Wollweber (SED)	1953–1955	1st Council of Ministers
State Security (1953–1955: State Secretariat for State Security; since 1989: Office for National Security)	Ernst Wollweber (SED)	1953–1955	2nd Council of Ministers
State Security (1953–1955: State Secretariat for State Security; since 1989: Office for National Security)	upgraded from state secretary in the Ministry of Interior to minister		
State Security (1953–1955: State Secretariat for State Security; since 1989: Office for National Security)	Ernst Wollweber (SED)	1955–1957	2nd Council of Ministers
State Security (1953–1955: State Secretariat for State Security; since 1989: Office for National Security)	Erich Mielke (SED)	1957–1989	2nd Council of Ministers
State Security (1953–1955: State Secretariat for State Security; since 1989: Office for National Security)	Erich Mielke (SED)	1957–1989	3rd Council of Ministers
State Security (1953–1955: State Secretariat for State Security; since 1989: Office for National Security)	Erich Mielke (SED)	1957–1989	4th Council of Ministers
State Security (1953–1955: State Secretariat for State Security; since 1989: Office for National Security)	Erich Mielke (SED)	1957–1989	5th Council of Ministers
State Security (1953–1955: State Secretariat for State Security; since 1989: Office for National Security)	Erich Mielke (SED)	1957–1989	6th Council of Ministers
State Security (1953–1955: State Secretariat for State Security; since 1989: Office for National Security)	Erich Mielke (SED)	1957–1989	7th Council of Ministers
State Security (1953–1955: State Secretariat for State Security; since 1989: Office for National Security)	Erich Mielke (SED)	1957–1989	8th Council of Ministers
State Security (1953–1955: State Secretariat for State Security; since 1989: Office for National Security)	Erich Mielke (SED)	1957–1989	9th Council of Ministers
State Security (1953–1955: State Secretariat for State Security; since 1989: Office for National Security)	Wolfgang Schwanitz (SED-PDS)	1989–1990 (Note: On leave of absence from 14 December 1989 to 11 January 1990)	Modrow government
State Security (1953–1955: State Secretariat for State Security; since 1989: Office for National Security)	Ministry dissolved		
National Defense (from 1990: Ministry of Disarmament and Defense)	split from Ministry of the Interior		
National Defense (from 1990: Ministry of Disarmament and Defense)	Willi Stoph (SED)	1956–1961	2nd Council of Ministers
National Defense (from 1990: Ministry of Disarmament and Defense)	Willi Stoph (SED)	1956–1961	3rd Council of Ministers
National Defense (from 1990: Ministry of Disarmament and Defense)	Heinz Hoffmann (SED)	1961–1985†	3rd Council of Ministers
National Defense (from 1990: Ministry of Disarmament and Defense)	Heinz Hoffmann (SED)	1961–1985†	4th Council of Ministers
National Defense (from 1990: Ministry of Disarmament and Defense)	Heinz Hoffmann (SED)	1961–1985†	5th Council of Ministers
National Defense (from 1990: Ministry of Disarmament and Defense)	Heinz Hoffmann (SED)	1961–1985†	6th Council of Ministers
National Defense (from 1990: Ministry of Disarmament and Defense)	Heinz Hoffmann (SED)	1961–1985†	7th Council of Ministers
National Defense (from 1990: Ministry of Disarmament and Defense)	Heinz Hoffmann (SED)	1961–1985†	8th Council of Ministers
National Defense (from 1990: Ministry of Disarmament and Defense)	Heinz Keßler (SED)	1985–1989	8th Council of Ministers
National Defense (from 1990: Ministry of Disarmament and Defense)	Heinz Keßler (SED)	1985–1989	9th Council of Ministers
National Defense (from 1990: Ministry of Disarmament and Defense)	Theodor Hoffmann (SED-PDS)	1989–1990	Modrow government
National Defense (from 1990: Ministry of Disarmament and Defense)	Rainer Eppelmann (DA/CDU)	1990	De Maizière government

=== Industry ministries ===
In addition to the departments that are usual in every government, the Council of Ministers was characterized by a large number of industry ministries that were set up from 1950 onwards. The State Planning Commission was a central organ of the Council of Ministers ("Planning authority 1st level") to coordinate the work of the individual industry ministries ("Planning authority 2nd level"). 1958 the industrial ministries were dissolved and merged in 1961 in the newly founded People's Economic Council (VWR). The chairman of the VWR was Alfred Neumann (SED). These organizational changes occurred in the course of the introduction of the New Economic System of Planning and Management (NÖSPL). The VWR was abolished again in 1965 and individual industrial ministries were set up again. As before, these were subordinate to the State Planning Commission.

In 1972, the Ministry for the Glass and Ceramics Industry was formed from parts of the glass and fine ceramics industry of various other ministries. The next major change occurred in 1973, when the Ministry of Processing Machinery and Vehicle Construction was split into two ministries, the Ministry of General Machinery, Agricultural Machinery and Vehicle Construction and the Ministry of Tool and Processing Machine Construction.

In 1989, a far-reaching restructuring of the industry ministries took place: the ministries for Bezirk-managed industry and food industry and the glass and ceramics industry were dissolved, and the business areas were transferred to the Ministry of Light Industry on January 1, 1990. The ministries for mechanical and vehicle construction, tool and processing machine construction, heavy machinery and plant construction, and electrical engineering and electronics were transferred to a newly formed Ministry of Mechanical Engineering. Karl Grünheid (SED), previously the long-standing minister for the glass and ceramics industry, became minister. A Ministry of Heavy Industry was also newly formed, which was made up of the ministries for geology, ore mining, metallurgy and potash, chemical industry, and coal and energy. The new minister was Kurt Singhuber (SED), who had previously been the long-serving minister for ore mining, metallurgy and potash. The Ministry of Materials Management, however, was incorporated into the State Planning Commission.

In the de Maizière government the three remaining industrial ministries of light industry, heavy industry and mechanical engineering as well as the Economic Committee for the Implementation of Economic Reform, successor to the State Planning Commission, were incorporated into the Ministry of Economics, which had only been founded in 1989.

Name of the ministry	Minister (party)	Term of office	Cabinet
Ore Mining, Metallurgy and Potash (1950 to 1955: Metallurgy and Ore Mining; 1955 to 1958: Mining and Metallurgy)	Fritz Selbmann (SED)	1950–1955	1st Council of Ministers
Ore Mining, Metallurgy and Potash (1950 to 1955: Metallurgy and Ore Mining; 1955 to 1958: Mining and Metallurgy)	Fritz Selbmann (SED)	1950–1955	2nd Council of Ministers
Ore Mining, Metallurgy and Potash (1950 to 1955: Metallurgy and Ore Mining; 1955 to 1958: Mining and Metallurgy)	Rudolf Steinwand (SED)	1955–1958	2nd Council of Ministers
Ore Mining, Metallurgy and Potash (1950 to 1955: Metallurgy and Ore Mining; 1955 to 1958: Mining and Metallurgy)	Ministry dissolved	1958–1965	3rd Council of Ministers
Ore Mining, Metallurgy and Potash (1950 to 1955: Metallurgy and Ore Mining; 1955 to 1958: Mining and Metallurgy)	Ministry dissolved	1958–1965	4th Council of Ministers
Ore Mining, Metallurgy and Potash (1950 to 1955: Metallurgy and Ore Mining; 1955 to 1958: Mining and Metallurgy)	Kurt Fichtner (SED)	1965–1967	4th Council of Ministers
Ore Mining, Metallurgy and Potash (1950 to 1955: Metallurgy and Ore Mining; 1955 to 1958: Mining and Metallurgy)	Kurt Singhuber (SED)	1967–1989	5th Council of Ministers
Ore Mining, Metallurgy and Potash (1950 to 1955: Metallurgy and Ore Mining; 1955 to 1958: Mining and Metallurgy)	Kurt Singhuber (SED)	1967–1989	6th Council of Ministers
Ore Mining, Metallurgy and Potash (1950 to 1955: Metallurgy and Ore Mining; 1955 to 1958: Mining and Metallurgy)	Kurt Singhuber (SED)	1967–1989	7th Council of Ministers
Ore Mining, Metallurgy and Potash (1950 to 1955: Metallurgy and Ore Mining; 1955 to 1958: Mining and Metallurgy)	Kurt Singhuber (SED)	1967–1989	8th Council of Ministers
Ore Mining, Metallurgy and Potash (1950 to 1955: Metallurgy and Ore Mining; 1955 to 1958: Mining and Metallurgy)	Kurt Singhuber (SED)	1967–1989	9th Council of Ministers
Ore Mining, Metallurgy and Potash (1950 to 1955: Metallurgy and Ore Mining; 1955 to 1958: Mining and Metallurgy)	dissolved to new Ministry of Heavy Industry		
Electrical Engineering and Electronics	Otfried Steger (SED)	1965–1982	4th Council of Ministers
Electrical Engineering and Electronics	Otfried Steger (SED)	1965–1982	5th Council of Ministers
Electrical Engineering and Electronics	Otfried Steger (SED)	1965–1982	6th Council of Ministers
Electrical Engineering and Electronics	Otfried Steger (SED)	1965–1982	7th Council of Ministers
Electrical Engineering and Electronics	Otfried Steger (SED)	1965–1982	8th Council of Ministers
Electrical Engineering and Electronics	Felix Meier (SED)	1982–1989	8th Council of Ministers
Electrical Engineering and Electronics	Felix Meier (SED)	1982–1989	9th Council of Ministers
Electrical Engineering and Electronics	dissolved to new Ministry of Mechanical Engineering		
Coal and Energy (1965 to 1971: Basic Industries)	Richard Goschütz (SED)	1956–1958	2nd Council of Ministers
Coal and Energy (1965 to 1971: Basic Industries)	Ministry dissolved	1958–1965	3rd Council of Ministers
Coal and Energy (1965 to 1971: Basic Industries)	Ministry dissolved	1958–1965	4th Council of Ministers
Coal and Energy (1965 to 1971: Basic Industries)	Klaus Siebold (SED)	1965–1979	4th Council of Ministers
Coal and Energy (1965 to 1971: Basic Industries)	Klaus Siebold (SED)	1965–1979	5th Council of Ministers
Coal and Energy (1965 to 1971: Basic Industries)	Klaus Siebold (SED)	1965–1979	6th Council of Ministers
Coal and Energy (1965 to 1971: Basic Industries)	Klaus Siebold (SED)	1965–1979	7th Council of Ministers
Coal and Energy (1965 to 1971: Basic Industries)	Wolfgang Mitzinger (SED)	1979–1989	7th Council of Ministers
Coal and Energy (1965 to 1971: Basic Industries)	Wolfgang Mitzinger (SED)	1979–1989	8th Council of Ministers
Coal and Energy (1965 to 1971: Basic Industries)	Wolfgang Mitzinger (SED)	1979–1989	9th Council of Ministers
Coal and Energy (1965 to 1971: Basic Industries)	dissolved to new Ministry of Heavy Industry		
Chemical Industry (1951–1953 State Secretariat for Chemistry, Minerals and Earth; 1953–1955 State Secretariat for Chemistry)	Dirk van Rickelen (SED)	1951–1953	1st Council of Ministers
Chemical Industry (1951–1953 State Secretariat for Chemistry, Minerals and Earth; 1953–1955 State Secretariat for Chemistry)	Werner Winkler (SED)	1953–1955	1st Council of Ministers
Chemical Industry (1951–1953 State Secretariat for Chemistry, Minerals and Earth; 1953–1955 State Secretariat for Chemistry)	Werner Winkler (SED)	1953–1955	2nd Council of Ministers
Chemical Industry (1951–1953 State Secretariat for Chemistry, Minerals and Earth; 1953–1955 State Secretariat for Chemistry)	upgraded from state secretary to minister		
Chemical Industry (1951–1953 State Secretariat for Chemistry, Minerals and Earth; 1953–1955 State Secretariat for Chemistry)	Werner Winkler (SED)	1955–1958	2nd Council of Ministers
Chemical Industry (1951–1953 State Secretariat for Chemistry, Minerals and Earth; 1953–1955 State Secretariat for Chemistry)	Ministry dissolved	1958–1965	3rd Council of Ministers
Chemical Industry (1951–1953 State Secretariat for Chemistry, Minerals and Earth; 1953–1955 State Secretariat for Chemistry)	Ministry dissolved	1958–1965	4th Council of Ministers
Chemical Industry (1951–1953 State Secretariat for Chemistry, Minerals and Earth; 1953–1955 State Secretariat for Chemistry)	Siegbert Löschau (SED)	1965–1966	4th Council of Ministers
Chemical Industry (1951–1953 State Secretariat for Chemistry, Minerals and Earth; 1953–1955 State Secretariat for Chemistry)	Günther Wyschofsky (SED)	1966–1989	4th Council of Ministers
Chemical Industry (1951–1953 State Secretariat for Chemistry, Minerals and Earth; 1953–1955 State Secretariat for Chemistry)	Günther Wyschofsky (SED)	1966–1989	5th Council of Ministers
Chemical Industry (1951–1953 State Secretariat for Chemistry, Minerals and Earth; 1953–1955 State Secretariat for Chemistry)	Günther Wyschofsky (SED)	1966–1989	6th Council of Ministers
Chemical Industry (1951–1953 State Secretariat for Chemistry, Minerals and Earth; 1953–1955 State Secretariat for Chemistry)	Günther Wyschofsky (SED)	1966–1989	7th Council of Ministers
Chemical Industry (1951–1953 State Secretariat for Chemistry, Minerals and Earth; 1953–1955 State Secretariat for Chemistry)	Günther Wyschofsky (SED)	1966–1989	8th Council of Ministers
Chemical Industry (1951–1953 State Secretariat for Chemistry, Minerals and Earth; 1953–1955 State Secretariat for Chemistry)	Günther Wyschofsky (SED)	1966–1989	9th Council of Ministers
Chemical Industry (1951–1953 State Secretariat for Chemistry, Minerals and Earth; 1953–1955 State Secretariat for Chemistry)	dissolved to new Ministry of Heavy Industry		
Glass and Ceramics Industry	Karl Bettin (SED)	1971–1972	6th Council of Ministers
Glass and Ceramics Industry	Werner Greiner-Petter (SED)	1972–1983	6th Council of Ministers
Glass and Ceramics Industry	Werner Greiner-Petter (SED)	1972–1983	7th Council of Ministers
Glass and Ceramics Industry	Werner Greiner-Petter (SED)	1972–1983	8th Council of Ministers
Glass and Ceramics Industry	Karl Grünheid (SED)	1983–1989	8th Council of Ministers
Glass and Ceramics Industry	Karl Grünheid (SED)	1983–1989	9th Council of Ministers
Glass and Ceramics Industry	dissolved to Ministry of Light Industry		
Materials Management (1950–1952 State Secretariat for Materials Supply; 1952–1953 State Administration for Materials Supply; 1953–1954 State Committee for Materials Supply)	Erwin Kerber (SED)	1950–1952	1st Council of Ministers
Materials Management (1950–1952 State Secretariat for Materials Supply; 1952–1953 State Administration for Materials Supply; 1953–1954 State Committee for Materials Supply)	State Secretariat dissolved	1952–1965	1st Council of Ministers
Materials Management (1950–1952 State Secretariat for Materials Supply; 1952–1953 State Administration for Materials Supply; 1953–1954 State Committee for Materials Supply)	State Secretariat dissolved	1952–1965	2nd Council of Ministers
Materials Management (1950–1952 State Secretariat for Materials Supply; 1952–1953 State Administration for Materials Supply; 1953–1954 State Committee for Materials Supply)	State Secretariat dissolved	1952–1965	3rd Council of Ministers
Materials Management (1950–1952 State Secretariat for Materials Supply; 1952–1953 State Administration for Materials Supply; 1953–1954 State Committee for Materials Supply)	State Secretariat dissolved	1952–1965	4th Council of Ministers
Materials Management (1950–1952 State Secretariat for Materials Supply; 1952–1953 State Administration for Materials Supply; 1953–1954 State Committee for Materials Supply)	Alfred Neumann (SED)	1965–1968	4th Council of Ministers
Materials Management (1950–1952 State Secretariat for Materials Supply; 1952–1953 State Administration for Materials Supply; 1953–1954 State Committee for Materials Supply)	Alfred Neumann (SED)	1965–1968	5th Council of Ministers
Materials Management (1950–1952 State Secretariat for Materials Supply; 1952–1953 State Administration for Materials Supply; 1953–1954 State Committee for Materials Supply)	Erich Haase (SED)	1968–1971	5th Council of Ministers
Materials Management (1950–1952 State Secretariat for Materials Supply; 1952–1953 State Administration for Materials Supply; 1953–1954 State Committee for Materials Supply)	Manfred Flegel (NDPD)	1971–1974	6th Council of Ministers
Materials Management (1950–1952 State Secretariat for Materials Supply; 1952–1953 State Administration for Materials Supply; 1953–1954 State Committee for Materials Supply)	Wolfgang Rauchfuß (SED)	1974–1989	6th Council of Ministers
Materials Management (1950–1952 State Secretariat for Materials Supply; 1952–1953 State Administration for Materials Supply; 1953–1954 State Committee for Materials Supply)	Wolfgang Rauchfuß (SED)	1974–1989	7th Council of Ministers
Materials Management (1950–1952 State Secretariat for Materials Supply; 1952–1953 State Administration for Materials Supply; 1953–1954 State Committee for Materials Supply)	Wolfgang Rauchfuß (SED)	1974–1989	8th Council of Ministers
Materials Management (1950–1952 State Secretariat for Materials Supply; 1952–1953 State Administration for Materials Supply; 1953–1954 State Committee for Materials Supply)	Wolfgang Rauchfuß (SED)	1974–1989	9th Council of Ministers
Materials Management (1950–1952 State Secretariat for Materials Supply; 1952–1953 State Administration for Materials Supply; 1953–1954 State Committee for Materials Supply)	dissolved to State Planning Commission		
Machine Tools and Processing Machine Construction (1965 to 1973: Machine Tools and Vehicle Construction)	Rudi Georgi (SED)	1965–1973	4th Council of Ministers
Machine Tools and Processing Machine Construction (1965 to 1973: Machine Tools and Vehicle Construction)	Rudi Georgi (SED)	1965–1973	5th Council of Ministers
Machine Tools and Processing Machine Construction (1965 to 1973: Machine Tools and Vehicle Construction)	Rudi Georgi (SED)	1965–1973	6th Council of Ministers
Machine Tools and Processing Machine Construction (1965 to 1973: Machine Tools and Vehicle Construction)	split into Ministry of General Mechanical Engineering, Agricultural Machinery and Vehicle Construction and Ministry of Machine Tools and Processing Machine Construction		
Machine Tools and Processing Machine Construction (1965 to 1973: Machine Tools and Vehicle Construction)	Rudi Georgi (SED)	1973–1989	6th Council of Ministers
Machine Tools and Processing Machine Construction (1965 to 1973: Machine Tools and Vehicle Construction)	Rudi Georgi (SED)	1973–1989	7th Council of Ministers
Machine Tools and Processing Machine Construction (1965 to 1973: Machine Tools and Vehicle Construction)	Rudi Georgi (SED)	1973–1989	8th Council of Ministers
Machine Tools and Processing Machine Construction (1965 to 1973: Machine Tools and Vehicle Construction)	Rudi Georgi (SED)	1973–1989	9th Council of Ministers
Machine Tools and Processing Machine Construction (1965 to 1973: Machine Tools and Vehicle Construction)	dissolved to new Ministry of Mechanical Engineering		
General Mechanical Engineering, Agricultural Machinery and Vehicle Construction	split from Ministry of Machine Tools and Vehicle Construction		
General Mechanical Engineering, Agricultural Machinery and Vehicle Construction	Günther Kleiber (SED)	1973–1986	6th Council of Ministers
General Mechanical Engineering, Agricultural Machinery and Vehicle Construction	Günther Kleiber (SED)	1973–1986	7th Council of Ministers
General Mechanical Engineering, Agricultural Machinery and Vehicle Construction	Günther Kleiber (SED)	1973–1986	8th Council of Ministers
General Mechanical Engineering, Agricultural Machinery and Vehicle Construction	Gerhard Tautenhahn (SED)	1986–1989	9th Council of Ministers
General Mechanical Engineering, Agricultural Machinery and Vehicle Construction	dissolved to new Ministry of Mechanical Engineering		
Heavy Machinery and Plant Engineering	Gerhard Zimmermann (SED)	1965–1981	4th Council of Ministers
Heavy Machinery and Plant Engineering	Gerhard Zimmermann (SED)	1965–1981	5th Council of Ministers
Heavy Machinery and Plant Engineering	Gerhard Zimmermann (SED)	1965–1981	6th Council of Ministers
Heavy Machinery and Plant Engineering	Gerhard Zimmermann (SED)	1965–1981	7th Council of Ministers
Heavy Machinery and Plant Engineering	Rolf Kersten (SED)	1981–1986	8th Council of Ministers
Heavy Machinery and Plant Engineering	Hans-Joachim Lauck (SED)	1986–1989	9th Council of Ministers
Heavy Machinery and Plant Engineering	dissolved to new Ministry of Mechanical Engineering		
Light Industry	Wilhelm Feldmann (NDPD)	1950–1958	1st Council of Ministers
Light Industry	Wilhelm Feldmann (NDPD)	1950–1958	2nd Council of Ministers
Light Industry	Ministry dissolved	1958–1965	3rd Council of Ministers
Light Industry	Ministry dissolved	1958–1965	4th Council of Ministers
Light Industry	Johann Wittik (SED)	1965–1972	4th Council of Ministers
Light Industry	Johann Wittik (SED)	1965–1972	5th Council of Ministers
Light Industry	Johann Wittik (SED)	1965–1972	6th Council of Ministers
Light Industry	Karl Bettin (SED)	1972–1978	6th Council of Ministers
Light Industry	Karl Bettin (SED)	1972–1978	7th Council of Ministers
Light Industry	Werner Buschmann (SED)	1978–1989	7th Council of Ministers
Light Industry	Werner Buschmann (SED)	1978–1989	8th Council of Ministers
Light Industry	Werner Buschmann (SED)	1978–1989	9th Council of Ministers
Light Industry	Gunter Halm (NDPD)	1989–1990	Modrow government
Light Industry	dissolved to Ministry of Economy		
Bezirk-managed Industry and Food Industry (1953 to 1958: Food Industry)	Kurt Westphal (SED)	1953–1958	1st Council of Ministers
Bezirk-managed Industry and Food Industry (1953 to 1958: Food Industry)	Kurt Westphal (SED)	1953–1958	2nd Council of Ministers
Bezirk-managed Industry and Food Industry (1953 to 1958: Food Industry)	Ministry dissolved	1958–1965	3rd Council of Ministers
Bezirk-managed Industry and Food Industry (1953 to 1958: Food Industry)	Ministry dissolved	1958–1965	4th Council of Ministers
Bezirk-managed Industry and Food Industry (1953 to 1958: Food Industry)	Erhard Krack (SED)	1965–1974	4th Council of Ministers
Bezirk-managed Industry and Food Industry (1953 to 1958: Food Industry)	Erhard Krack (SED)	1965–1974	5th Council of Ministers
Bezirk-managed Industry and Food Industry (1953 to 1958: Food Industry)	Erhard Krack (SED)	1965–1974	6th Council of Ministers
Bezirk-managed Industry and Food Industry (1953 to 1958: Food Industry)	Udo-Dieter Wange (SED)	1974–1989	6th Council of Ministers
Bezirk-managed Industry and Food Industry (1953 to 1958: Food Industry)	Udo-Dieter Wange (SED)	1974–1989	7th Council of Ministers
Bezirk-managed Industry and Food Industry (1953 to 1958: Food Industry)	Udo-Dieter Wange (SED)	1974–1989	8th Council of Ministers
Bezirk-managed Industry and Food Industry (1953 to 1958: Food Industry)	Udo-Dieter Wange (SED)	1974–1989	9th Council of Ministers
Bezirk-managed Industry and Food Industry (1953 to 1958: Food Industry)	dissolved to Ministry of Light Industry		

=== Commissions and offices equivalent to ministries ===
Name of the position in the Council of Ministers	Minister (party)	Term of office	Cabinet
State Planning Commission (until 1950: Ministry of Planning; from 1990: Economic Committee for the Implementation of Economic Reform)	Heinrich Rau (SED)	1949–1952	Provisional Government of the GDR
State Planning Commission (until 1950: Ministry of Planning; from 1990: Economic Committee for the Implementation of Economic Reform)	Heinrich Rau (SED)	1949–1952	1st Council of Ministers
State Planning Commission (until 1950: Ministry of Planning; from 1990: Economic Committee for the Implementation of Economic Reform)	Bruno Leuschner (SED)	1952–1961	1st Council of Ministers
State Planning Commission (until 1950: Ministry of Planning; from 1990: Economic Committee for the Implementation of Economic Reform)	Bruno Leuschner (SED)	1952–1961	2nd Council of Ministers
State Planning Commission (until 1950: Ministry of Planning; from 1990: Economic Committee for the Implementation of Economic Reform)	Bruno Leuschner (SED)	1952–1961	3rd Council of Ministers
State Planning Commission (until 1950: Ministry of Planning; from 1990: Economic Committee for the Implementation of Economic Reform)	Karl Mewis (SED)	1961–1963	3rd Council of Ministers
State Planning Commission (until 1950: Ministry of Planning; from 1990: Economic Committee for the Implementation of Economic Reform)	Erich Apel (SED)	1963–1965†	4th Council of Ministers
State Planning Commission (until 1950: Ministry of Planning; from 1990: Economic Committee for the Implementation of Economic Reform)	Gerhard Schürer (SED)	1965–1990	4th Council of Ministers
State Planning Commission (until 1950: Ministry of Planning; from 1990: Economic Committee for the Implementation of Economic Reform)	Gerhard Schürer (SED)	1965–1990	5th Council of Ministers
State Planning Commission (until 1950: Ministry of Planning; from 1990: Economic Committee for the Implementation of Economic Reform)	Gerhard Schürer (SED)	1965–1990	6th Council of Ministers
State Planning Commission (until 1950: Ministry of Planning; from 1990: Economic Committee for the Implementation of Economic Reform)	Gerhard Schürer (SED)	1965–1990	7th Council of Ministers
State Planning Commission (until 1950: Ministry of Planning; from 1990: Economic Committee for the Implementation of Economic Reform)	Gerhard Schürer (SED)	1965–1990	8th Council of Ministers
State Planning Commission (until 1950: Ministry of Planning; from 1990: Economic Committee for the Implementation of Economic Reform)	Gerhard Schürer (SED)	1965–1990	9th Council of Ministers
State Planning Commission (until 1950: Ministry of Planning; from 1990: Economic Committee for the Implementation of Economic Reform)	Gerhard Schürer (SED)	1965–1990	Modrow government
State Planning Commission (until 1950: Ministry of Planning; from 1990: Economic Committee for the Implementation of Economic Reform)	Karl Grünheid (SED)	1990	Modrow government
State Planning Commission (until 1950: Ministry of Planning; from 1990: Economic Committee for the Implementation of Economic Reform)	dissolved to Ministry of Economy		
Minister and Chairman of the Committee of the Workers' and Farmers' Inspection (from 1990: Committee for People's Control)	Heinz Matthes (SED)	1963–1977	4th Council of Ministers
Minister and Chairman of the Committee of the Workers' and Farmers' Inspection (from 1990: Committee for People's Control)	Heinz Matthes (SED)	1963–1977	5th Council of Ministers
Minister and Chairman of the Committee of the Workers' and Farmers' Inspection (from 1990: Committee for People's Control)	Heinz Matthes (SED)	1963–1977	6th Council of Ministers
Minister and Chairman of the Committee of the Workers' and Farmers' Inspection (from 1990: Committee for People's Control)	Heinz Matthes (SED)	1963–1977	7th Council of Ministers
Minister and Chairman of the Committee of the Workers' and Farmers' Inspection (from 1990: Committee for People's Control)	Albert Stief (SED)	1977–1989	7th Council of Ministers
Minister and Chairman of the Committee of the Workers' and Farmers' Inspection (from 1990: Committee for People's Control)	Albert Stief (SED)	1977–1989	8th Council of Ministers
Minister and Chairman of the Committee of the Workers' and Farmers' Inspection (from 1990: Committee for People's Control)	Albert Stief (SED)	1977–1989	9th Council of Ministers
Minister and Chairman of the Committee of the Workers' and Farmers' Inspection (from 1990: Committee for People's Control)	reorganized as Committee for People's Control		
Minister and Chairman of the Committee of the Workers' and Farmers' Inspection (from 1990: Committee for People's Control)	Heinz Kittner (SED)	1990	Modrow government
Minister and Chairman of the Committee of the Workers' and Farmers' Inspection (from 1990: Committee for People's Control)	abolished		
Minister and Head of the Office for Prices	Walter Halbritter (SED)	1965–1989	4th Council of Ministers
Minister and Head of the Office for Prices	Walter Halbritter (SED)	1965–1989	5th Council of Ministers
Minister and Head of the Office for Prices	Walter Halbritter (SED)	1965–1989	6th Council of Ministers
Minister and Head of the Office for Prices	Walter Halbritter (SED)	1965–1989	7th Council of Ministers
Minister and Head of the Office for Prices	Walter Halbritter (SED)	1965–1989	7th Council of Ministers
Minister and Head of the Office for Prices	Walter Halbritter (SED)	1965–1989	8th Council of Ministers
Minister and Head of the Office for Prices	Walter Halbritter (SED)	1965–1989	9th Council of Ministers
Minister and Head of the Office for Prices	dissolved to new Ministry of Finance and Prices		
Head of the Press Office	Fritz Beyling (SED)	1953–1958	1st Council of Ministers
Head of the Press Office	Fritz Beyling (SED)	1953–1958	2nd Council of Ministers
Head of the Press Office	Kurt Blecha (SED)	1958–1989	3rd Council of Ministers
Head of the Press Office	Kurt Blecha (SED)	1958–1989	4th Council of Ministers
Head of the Press Office	Kurt Blecha (SED)	1958–1989	5th Council of Ministers
Head of the Press Office	Kurt Blecha (SED)	1958–1989	6th Council of Ministers
Head of the Press Office	Kurt Blecha (SED)	1958–1989	7th Council of Ministers
Head of the Press Office	Kurt Blecha (SED)	1958–1989	8th Council of Ministers
Head of the Press Office	Kurt Blecha (SED)	1958–1989	9th Council of Ministers
Head of the Press Office	Wolfgang Meyer (SED)	1989–1990	Modrow government
Head of the Press Office	demoted to state secretary in the Minister-President's Office		
Head of the Press Office	Matthias Gehler (CDU)	1990	de Maizière government

=== Other government offices of the Council of Ministers ===
In addition, independent state secretariats and central offices were directly subordinate to the Council of Ministers, including

- the State Secretariat for Labor and Wages: Hellmuth Geyer from 1965
- the State Secretariat for Church Affairs: Werner Eggerath, Hans Seigewasser, Klaus Gysi, Kurt Löffler
- the State Committee for Physical Culture and Sport
- the State Central Administration for Statistics (SZS): Arno Donda from 1963
- the Office for Standardization, Metrology and Product Testing (ASMW)
- the Office for Industrial Design (AiF): Martin Kelm from 1972
- the Office for Youth Affairs (including Johannes Keusch)
- the State Secretariat for Vocational Training (from 1970, previously from 1966 State Office for Vocational Training): Bodo Weidemann from 1968
- the State Office for Nuclear Safety and Radiation Protection (SAAS)

In some cases, their heads acted as members of the Council of Ministers.

== See also ==
- State Council of East Germany
- Council of Ministers of the Hungarian People's Republic
- Council of Ministers of the Soviet Union
- State Council of China
