= Ministry of Higher and Technical Education (East Germany) =

The Ministry of Higher and Technical Education (German: Ministerium für das Hoch- und Fachschulwesen) was created in 1967 to provide co-ordination to the universities and technical colleges of the German Democratic Republic. Its journal was Hochschulewesen (Higher Education).

The "State Secretariat for Higher Education" (Staatssekretariat für Hochschulwesen) had been founded in 1951, but was initially without ministerial status. in 1958 Its name was changed to the "State Secretariat for Higher and Technical Education", to better reflect its role in vocational education. It only achieved ministerial status in 1967. Ernst-Joachim Gießmann was the first minister, in office from 1967 to 1970. After Gießmann returned to academia, he was replaced by Hans-Joachim Böhme, who was in office until 1989.

Acting on guidance from the State Planning Commission and the Ministry of Finance (See also Council of Ministers of East Germany), the ministry decided university and college budgets and investments, levels of annual student enrollment, and academic salaries. It also took a large role in deciding the content of university education and research, and training academic staff.

It was absorbed in 1990 by the Ministry of Science and Technology, which was itself dissolved in the reunification process.
