= Ernst Scholz =

Ernst Scholz may refer to:

- Ernst Scholz (politician, born 1874) (1874–1932), lawyer and politician in the Weimar Republic
- Ernst Scholz (politician, born 1913) (1913–1986), German architect, economist, diplomat and politician in East Germany
