= Karl Grünheid =

German politician (1931–2004)

Chairman of the Economic Committee of the Council of Ministers
- In office 11 January 1990 – 12 April 1990
- Chairman of the Council of Ministers: Hans Modrow
- Preceded by: Gerhard Schürer (as Chairman of the State Planning Commission)
- Succeeded by: Position abolished

Minister for Mechanical Engineering
- In office 18 November 1989 – 11 January 1990
- Chairman of the Council of Ministers: Hans Modrow
- Preceded by: Position established
- Succeeded by: Hans-Joachim Lauck

Minister for the Glass and Ceramic Industry
- In office 8 December 1983 – 18 November 1989
- Chairman of the Council of Ministers: Willi Stoph
- Preceded by: Werner Greiner-Petter
- Succeeded by: Position abolished

Personal details
- Born: Karl Grünheid; 20 July 1931 Berlin, Free State of Prussia, Weimar Republic (now Germany)
- Died: 9 January 2004 (aged 72) Berlin, Germany
- Resting place: Friedrichsfelde Central Cemetery
- Party: Socialist Unity Party (1953–1989)
- Education: Hochschule für Ökonomie Berlin (Dipl.-Ök.)
- Occupation: Politician; Civil Servant; Bricklayer
- Awards: Patriotic Order of Merit, 1st class; Banner of Labor
- Central institution membership: 1961–1963: Full member, Bezirk Magdeburg SED leadership; Other offices held: 1971–1983: State Secretary, State Planning Commission; 1968–1971: General Director, VEB Metalleichtbaukombinat Leipzig; 1965–1968: Deputy Chairman, State Planning Commission; 1963–1965: First Deputy Chairman, State Planning Commission; 1961–1963: General Director, VVB Ausrüstungen für Schwerindustrie und Getriebebau Magdeburg

Karl Grünheid (20 July 1931 – 9 January 2004) was a German civil servant and politician of the Socialist Unity Party (SED).

Grünheid notably served as Chairman of the Council of Ministers' Economic Committee, successor of the State Planning Commission, in the new transitional government of Hans Modrow during the Peaceful Revolution.

== Life and career ==
=== Early career ===
Grünheid, the son of a bricklayer, completed his education after attending elementary and high school, earning his high school diploma. From 1950 to 1952, he trained as a bricklayer. In 1952, as an apprentice at the VEB Bau (a state-owned construction company), he worked on the high-rise building at Weberwiese and Stalinallee and criticized the deficiencies in the Berlin construction industry at the Berlin Construction Workers' Conference.

From 1952 to 1956, he studied at the Hochschule für Ökonomie Berlin (University of Economics), earning a degree in economics (Dipl.-Ök.).

From 1950 to 1957, he was a member of the Free German Youth (FDJ) and joined the ruling Socialist Unity Party (SED) in 1953.

=== Civil Servant ===
From 1956 to 1958, he worked in the Ministry of Heavy Machinery, then became head of planning, deputy general director, and finally general director of the VVB for heavy industry equipment and gear construction in Magdeburg. In 1961, he earned his doctorate in economics (Dr. rer. oec.). For several years, he was a full member of the Bezirk Magdeburg SED leadership.

From March 1963 to December 1965, he served as First Deputy Chairman of the State Planning Commission, responsible for annual planning, holding full Minister rank. After Chairman Erich Apel's suicide in December 1965, he was demoted to deputy chairman, responsible for rationalization, automation, and data processing under his successor Gerhard Schürer.

From 1968 to 1971, Grünheid was the general director of the VEB Metal Lightweight Construction Combine in Leipzig, while also serving as a professor of socialist business administration at the Leipzig University of Civil Engineering. In 1969, he was appointed professor and extraordinary member of the GDR Research Council.

From 1971 to 1983, he worked again in the State Planning Commission, this time as State Secretary and head of the Foreign Trade department. He also served as deputy head of the joint government commission for economic and scientific-technical cooperation between the GDR and the USSR.

In December 1983, he succeeded retiring Werner Greiner-Petter as Minister for the Glass and Ceramic Industry in the Stoph government.

Grünheid was awarded the Patriotic Order of Merit in Silver in 1975, in Gold in 1981 and the Banner of Labor in 1980.

=== Peaceful Revolution ===
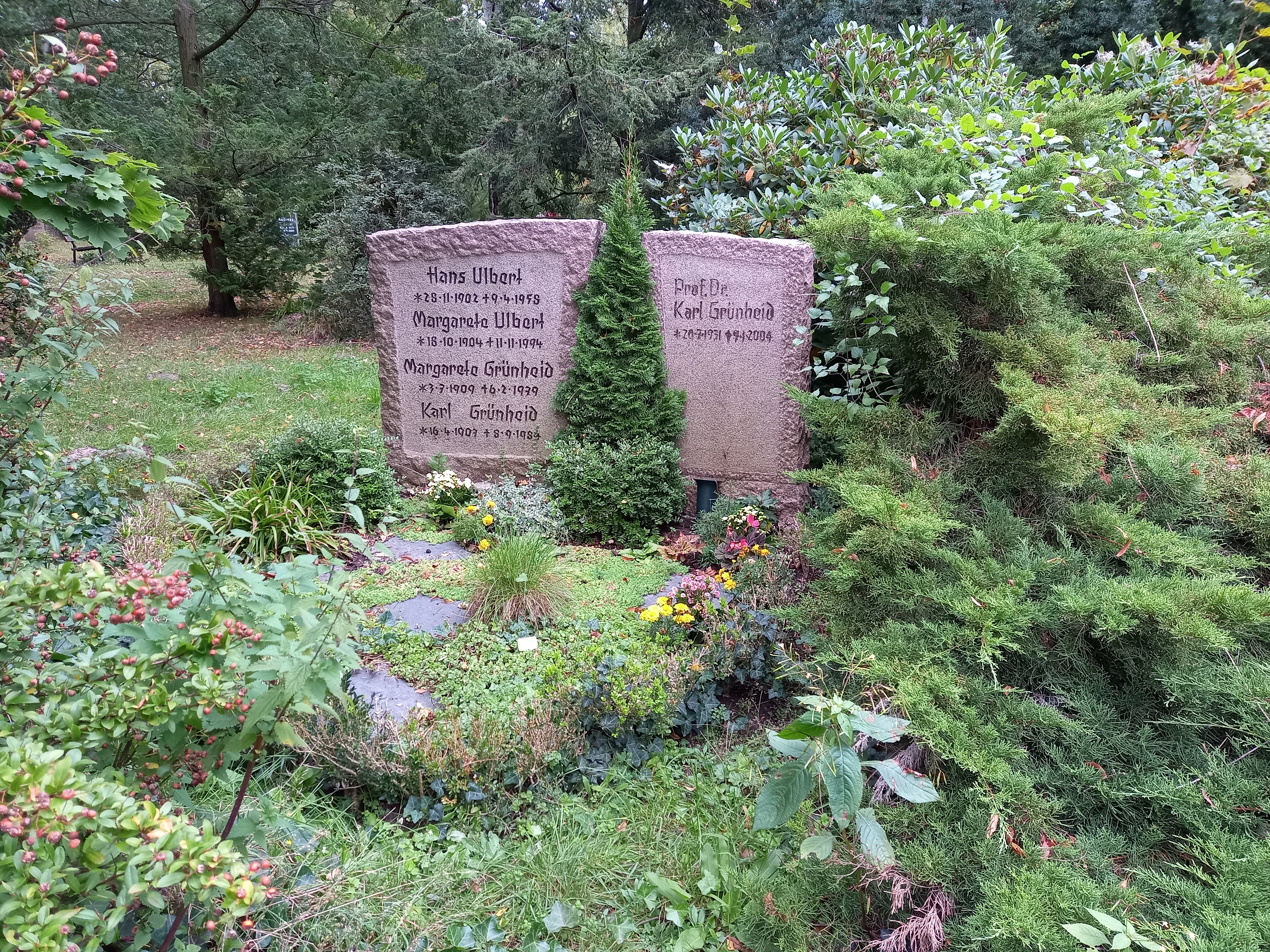
Grünheid's grave (right) in 2021

During the Peaceful Revolution, the Ministry for the Glass and Ceramic Industry was abolished. Grünheid was promoted to Minister for Mechanical Engineering in the transitional government of Hans Modrow. In January 1990, he was made chairman with minister rank of the Economic Committee of the Council of Ministers – full title being Economic Committee for the Implementation of an Economic Reform (German: Wirtschaftskomitee für die Durchführung einer Wirtschaftsreform) –, successor of the State Planning Commission.

Grünheid died in 2004 at the age of 72. He was buried in the Friedrichsfelde Central Cemetery in Berlin.
