= Bruno Leuschner =

Politician and functionary of the Socialist Unity Party of Germany (1919–1965)

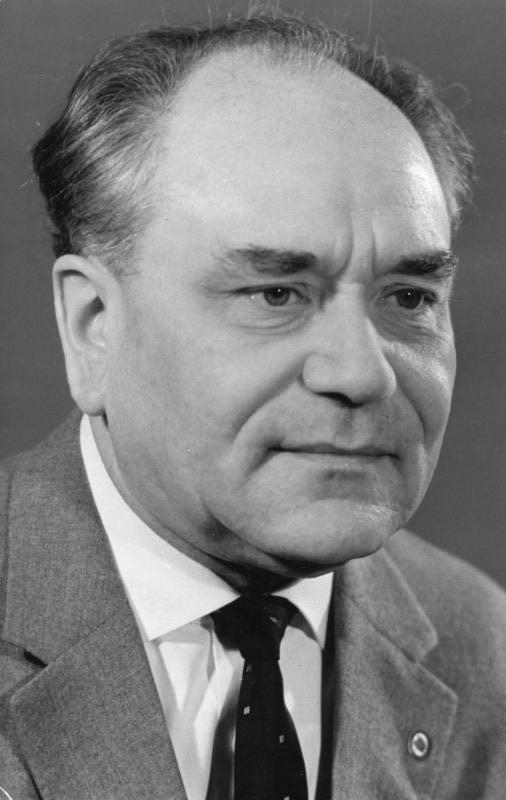
- Leuschner in 1963

Permanent Representative of the GDR in Comecon
- In office June 1962 – 10 February 1965
- Chairman of the Council of Ministers: Otto Grotewohl; Willi Stoph
- Preceded by: Position established
- Succeeded by: Gerhard Weiss

Chairman of the State Planning Commission
- In office 23 May 1952 – 6 July 1961
- Chairman of the Council of Ministers: Otto Grotewohl
- First Deputy: Margarete Wittkowski; Kurt Gregor
- Preceded by: Heinrich Rau
- Succeeded by: Karl Mewis

Head of the Economic Department of the Central Committee
- In office April 1946 – June 1947
- Secretary: Walter Ulbricht; Max Fechner
- Preceded by: Position established
- Succeeded by: Willi Stoph

Personal details
- Born: 12 August 1910 Rixdorf, Province of Brandenburg, Kingdom of Prussia, German Empire (now Berlin-Neukölln, Germany)
- Died: 10 February 1965 (aged 54) East Berlin, German Democratic Republic
- Resting place: Memorial of the Socialists, Friedrichsfelde Central Cemetery
- Party: Socialist Unity Party (1946–1965)
- Other political affiliations: Communist Party of Germany (1931–1946)
- Spouse: Renate Bischoff
- Education: Friedrich Wilhelm University (no degree); Lessing-Hochschule zu Berlin (no degree); Marxist Workers' School
- Awards: Patriotic Order of Merit, 1st class; Medal for Fighters against Fascism; Hero of Labour
- Central institution membership: 1958–1965: Full member, Politburo of the Central Committee; 1953–1958: Candidate member, Politburo of the Central Committee; 1950–1965: Full member, Central Committee; Other offices held: 1960–1965: Member, National Defence Council; 1960–1963: Member, State Council; 1955–1965: Deputy Chairman, Council of Ministers; 1950–1952: First Deputy Chairman, State Planning Commission; 1949–1950: State Secretary, Ministry of Planning; 1948–1949: Deputy Chairman for Planning, German Economic Commission

Bruno Max Leuschner (12 August 1910 – 10 February 1965) was a German politician and functionary of the Socialist Unity Party of Germany.

== Biography ==
Leuschner was born into the family of a shoemaker and a seamstress. After graduating from high school in Berlin-Neukölln, he completed a clerical internship at the Lachmann & Meyer clothing factory in Berlin, where he then worked as a clerk, calculator, salesman, and most recently as an employee of the export department. In the evenings he studied economics, philosophy and psychology at the Lessing University and the Friedrich Wilhelm University. He also attended the Marxist Workers' School and in 1931, he joined the KPD in the Berlin-Neukölln district, then he was active in Berlin-Wedding Ost, and from 1933 he held positions. He was a collaborator of the newspaper "Der Rote Wedding" and was also active in KPD's military intelligence M-Apparat. In 1936, Leuschner was arrested and sentenced in 1937 by the District Court of Berlin to six years in prison for "conspiracy to commit high treason", which he served in Brandenburg-Görden and Sonnenburg prisons. He was then imprisoned in the Sachsenhausen and Mauthausen concentration camps until he was liberated in 1945.

Leuschner was involved in establishing the economic department of the KPD, of which he was then head. As head of the Economic and Finance Department of the SED Central Committee, he played a major role in the creation of the German Economic Commission, where he was entrusted with the leadership, first of the Economic Affairs Department, then of the Planning Department and at the same time deputy head of the entire planning commission. While performing these functions, he contributed to the preparation of the half-year plan of 1948 and the two-year plan of 1949/1950 of the GDR.

From 1950 to 1952 he was first deputy chairman and from 1952 to 1961 he was chairman of the State Planning Commission as the successor to Heinrich Rau. He was elected a member of the Central Committee of the SED and a member of the Volkskammer in 1953, and member of the Politburo of the Central Committee of the SED from 1958. Leuschner was deputy chairman of the Council of Ministers of the GDR (1955–1965), member of the GDR State Council (1960–1963) and a member of the National Defense Council (1960–1965). In 1961, at the 13th Congress of the SED Central Committee, he was removed from the SED Central Committee as chairman of the State Planning Commission of the GDR, at the same time entrusting him with the position of minister responsible for coordinating basic economic tasks in the Chancellery of the Prime Minister of the GDR, and again as the permanent representative of the GDR to Comecon in 1962.

His urn was buried in the Friedrichsfelde Central Cemetery in Berlin-Lichtenberg.
