= Heinz Winkler (chef) =

Italian-German three-Michelin star chef (1949–2022)

- Born: 17 July 1949; Brixen, South Tyrol, Italy
- Died: 28 October 2022 (aged 73); Rosenheim, Bavaria, Germany
- Culinary career
- Current restaurant: Residenz Heinz Winkler (Bavaria)

Heinz Winkler (17 July 1949 – 28 October 2022) was an Italian-German three-Michelin star chef.

Heinz Winkler was the youngest ever chef to receive three Michelin stars, when, in 1981, he was 32 years old. He also was the first Italian chef to receive three Michelin stars. He specialized in cooking wild game. He received the Federal Cross of Merit in 2001.

Winkler died on 28 October 2022, at the age of 73.
