= Hans-Joachim Lauck =

- Born: 27 September 1937 (age 88); Freyburg (Unstrut), Saxony-Anhalt, Germany
- Occupation: Politician
- Political party: SED

Hans-Joachim Lauck (born 27 September 1937) was a Minister for Heavy Plant and Machinery Construction in the East Germany.

== Life ==
Lauck was born into a working-class family a small town in a wine-producing region in central Germany, some 63 km (40 miles) to the west of Leipzig. By the time he left school, the war had ended and the region in which he lived had become first the Soviet occupation zone in what remained of Germany and then, formally founded in October 1949, the Soviet sponsored German Democratic Republic. He undertook a training as a pipe-fitter between 1951 and 1955 in the "VEB (People owned business) Metal Production and Rolling Mill" at Merseburg. He was also, from 1951 up till 1964, a member of the FDJ, which was in effect the youth wing of East Germany's ruling SED (party). A further period of study at the Engineering Academy for Steel Production and Rolling at Riesa followed between 1955 and 1958, leading to a degree in Steel rolling mill Engineering.

Between 1958 and 1963, Lauck worked at the "VEB William Florin Steel and rolling mill" facility at Hennigsdorf, first as Assistant to the Production Director and then as Head of Production. He undertook further study by correspondence course from 1962 till 1968 with the Freiberg Mining Academy. In 1963, now aged 25, Hans-Joachim Lauck joined the Socialist Unity Party of Germany (SED / Sozialistische Einheitspartei Deutschlands) which since its controversial creation in April 1946 had become the ruling party, as part of a return to one-party government within this Soviet sponsored version of Germany.

As a party member Lauck continued to work in the country's strategically and industrially important steel production sector. From 1963 till 1969, he was Chief Officer, Department Head and Production Director at the "VVB ("United people's owned businesses") steel production and rolling mill" at Berlin. After this, he worked as Production Director at the "VEB Quality and Carbon Steel Combine Hennigsdorf", a short distance outside Berlin. From 1970 till 1979, Lauck was the Director of the Brandenburg Steel production and rolling Mill, and from 1979 till 1986 General Director of the Brandenburg Quality and Carbon Steel Combine. In 1975/76, Lauck was a student at the Party Central Committee's "Karl Marx" Academy, which adumbrated a more openly political career for him. In 1985, he received an engineering doctorate from the Freiberg Mining Academy. Also during this period, he served in the Party Leadership Team in Brandenburg, and was, for a number of years, a municipal councilor in Brandenburg.

A move into national government came in July 1986 when Hans-Joachim Lauck was appointed Minister for Heavy Plant and Machinery Construction in succession to Rolf Kersten. The country's constitution by now asserted the leading role of The Party, so that in some ways it was the primary task of government ministers simply to carry out party policy, though at the higher levels the same individuals were often in positions of power and influence in both institutions, making the distinction relatively unimportant. There were approximately fifteen government ministers covering departments with areas of responsibility not dissimilar from their western equivalents. Additionally, however, under the New Economic System of Planning and Direction (Neues Ökonomisches System der Planung und Leitung) established (formally) in 1961, there were a further (approximately) fifteen ministers with responsibility for individual industry sectors. Lauck was one of these. In November 1986, he joined the country's Council of Ministers. On 15 January 1990, he became the Minister for Mechanical Engineering in succession to Karl Grünheid in the government of Hans Modrow, remaining in office till the change of government that came about following the country's first and last free national election in April 1990. He was not one of those who had participated in the election, and during the run up to reunification the government no longer employed fifteen junior ministers with responsibility for individual industry sectors: however, Launck continued to work in the Economics Ministry as a deputy departmental director under the government of Lothar de Maizière, which continued in office till the formal reunification of Germany in October 1990.

== Award ==
- 1987 Patriotic Order of Merit
