= Heinz Winkler (politician) =

German politician and architect (1910–1958)

Minister of Development
- In office 1953–1958
- Preceded by: Lothar Bolz
- Succeeded by: Ernst Scholz

Personal details
- Born: 7 July 1910 Chemnitz, German Empire
- Died: 25 June 1958 (aged 47) East Berlin, East Germany
- Party: Christian Democratic Union

Heinz Winkler (7 July 1910 – 25 June 1958) was a German politician and architect who served as Minister for Development (German: Minister für Aufbau) in East Germany from 1953 to 1958. He became a member of the Christian Democratic Union in 1948.

Winkler was born in Chemnitz, Saxony. He was trained as an architect. In 1938 he joined the Nazi Party. From 1941 to 1945 he was a Wehrmacht soldier. Until 1953 Winkler was the leader of a reconstruction bureau, responsible for the reconstruction of the city of Chemnitz.

From 1953 to 1958 Winkler was the head of the architectural bureau that designed the new East German city of Stalinstadt (re-named Eisenhüttenstadt in 1960).

From 1954 Winkler was a member of the Executive Committee of the CDU and since 1956 a member of the Presidium of the CDU.

Winkler died after a car accident.
