= Ernst Scholz (politician, born 1913) =

German economist, diplomat and politician (1913–1986)

Minister for Construction
- In office 24 September 1958 – 7 February 1963
- Chairman of the Council of Ministers: Otto Grotewohl
- First Deputy: Gerhard Kosel; Wolfgang Junker
- Preceded by: Heinz Winkler (Reconstruction)
- Succeeded by: Wolfgang Junker

Head of the Economic Policy Department of the Central Committee
- In office 24 July 1950 – 1 April 1952
- Secretary: Willi Stoph
- Preceded by: Willi Stoph
- Succeeded by: Adalbert Hengst
Volkskammer
Member of the Volkskammer
In office 8 December 1958 – 14 November 1963
Preceded by	multi-member district
Succeeded by	multi-member district

Personal details
- Born: Ernst Scholz; 19 July 1913 Berlin, Kingdom of Prussia, German Empire (now Germany)
- Died: 26 June 1986 (aged 72) East Berlin, East Germany (now Germany)
- Party: Socialist Unity Party (1946–1986)
- Other political affiliations: Communist Party of Germany (1934–1946)
- Education: Technische Universität Berlin
- Occupation: Politician; Civil Servant; Architect
- Other offices held: 1968–1973: First Deputy Minister, Ministry of Foreign Affairs

Ernst Scholz (1913–1986) was a German architect, economist, diplomat and politician who held various posts in East German government. He was the minister of public works and the ambassador of East Germany to the United Arab Republic and to France.

== Early life and education ==
Scholz was born in Berlin on 19 July 1913. He attended Technische Hochschule Berlin (now Technische Universität Berlin) studying architecture and urban planning in 1933. The same year he was briefly arrested and after his release from prison, he left Germany for France where he studied at the École Spéciale d'Architecture between 1933 and 1934. Scholz continued his education while serving in the East Germany and studied at the University of Rostock from 1954 to 1956 receiving a degree in economics. In September 1963 he obtained a Ph.D. in economics from the same university.

== Career and activities ==
Following his return to Germany Scholz joined the Communist Party of Germany in 1934 and worked as an architect in Berlin from 1934 to 1937. He settled first in Prague and then in Paris before he participated in the Spanish Civil War as part of the 11th International Brigade in 1938. He went to Paris in 1939 and joined the French resistance groups fighting against the Nazi forces. Scholz was made a French citizen after liberation in 1944. He returned to Germany after World War II and served as the head of the agriculture and economic planning in the state government of Brandenburg from August 1945 to 1949. He joined the Socialist Unity Party of Germany in 1946 and became a member of its central committee in 1950.

Scholz was named as the diplomatic representative of East Germany for the Middle East in 1956 which he held until August 1958. During the same period he was also a member of the SED city management in Rostock. He was appointed minister of public works in August 1958, and his tenure ended in February 1963 when he was succeeded by Heinz Winkler in the post. One of the significant events during Scholz's term as minister of public works was the erection of the Berlin Wall for which he met with several figures from the Eastern Block countries in 1961, including the Yugoslav leader Josip Tito, to get their support.

Scholz was a member of the Volkskammer, East German Parliament, in the period between 1958 and 1963. He was appointed ambassador of East Germany to the United Arab Republic in 1963, replacing Wolfgang Kiesewetter in the post. Scholz remained in office until 1968 when he was named as the deputy minister for foreign affairs. He was the state secretary and first deputy minister between 1969 and 1974. Scholz was the ambassador of East Germany to France from March 1974 to July 1976, being the first East German official to hold the post. Scholz was succeeded by Werner Fleck as East German ambassador to France.

== Personal life and death ==
Scholz was married to Irmgard Scholz. He died in East Berlin on 12 June 1986.

=== Awards ===
Scholz was the recipient of the medal for fighters against the Fascists (1958), the Banner of Labor (1965), Patriotic Order of Merit (1973) and the Order of Karl Marx (1976). During his diplomatic post in the United Arab Republic in the 1960s he was also awarded the Order of the Republic.
