= Max Fechner =

German politician (1892–1973)

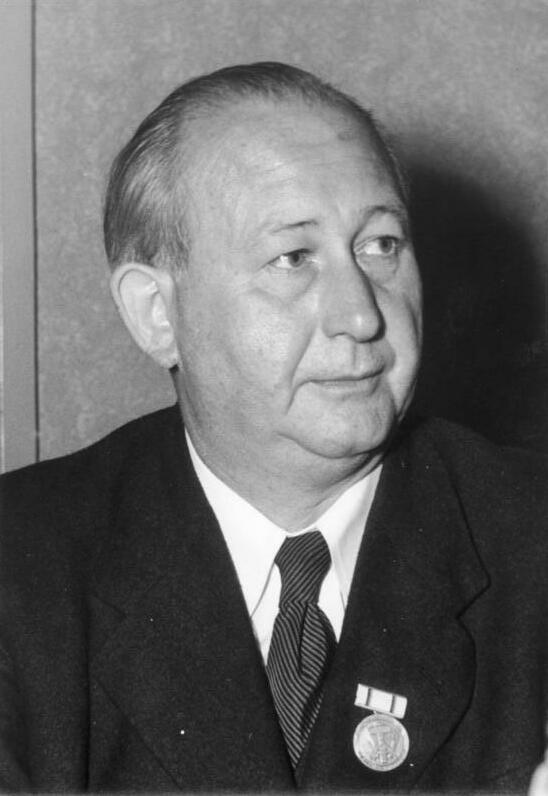
- Fechner in 1952

Minister of Justice of the German Democratic Republic
- In office 11 October 1949 – 15 July 1953
- Minister-President: Otto Grotewohl
- Preceded by: Office established
- Succeeded by: Hilde Benjamin

Member of the Volkskammer
- In office 1950–1953

Member of the Landtag of Prussia
- In office 1928–1933

Personal details
- Born: July 27, 1892 Berlin, German Empire
- Died: September 13, 1973 (aged 81) Schöneiche, German Democratic Republic
- Resting place: Zentralfriedhof Friedrichsfelde, Berlin
- Party: SPD (1910–1917, 1922–1946); USPD (1917–1922); SED (1946–1953, after 1958)
- Education: University of Bonn; University of Marburg
- Occupation: Politician
- Awards: Order of Karl Marx (1972); Patriotic Order of Merit, in gold (1967); Patriotic Order of Merit, in silver (1965)

Max Fechner (27 July 1892 – 13 September 1973) was a German politician who served as Minister of Justice of East Germany from 1949 to 1953.

== Life and career ==
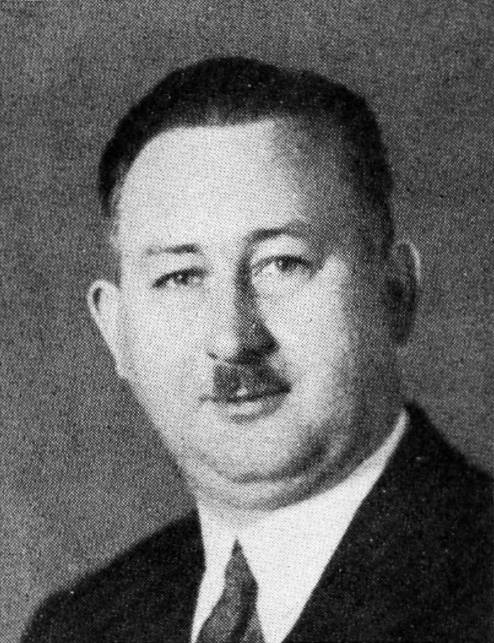
Fechner's official Landtag portrait, 1932

Fechner was born in Berlin and was a trained tool maker. He joined the SPD in 1910, was a member of the USPD from 1917 to 1922, and then returned to the SPD. He was a district councilor for the Neukölln district of Berlin from 1921 to 1925, and member of the Landtag of Prussia from 1928 to 1933. He worked in the National Executive of the SPD and was the editor of the municipal policy magazine Die Gemeinde (The Community).

Fechner participated in the social-democratic resistance group led by Franz Künstler, and was jailed in 1933–1934 and 1944–1945 by the Nazi regime.

After the war, Fechner became a member of the SED, he was elected to its Executive Committee and Central Committee. Between 1946 and 1948, he was a city councilor for East Berlin, he was elected in 1949 to the German People's Council, in 1950 to the People's Chamber.

In 1948, Fechner succeeded Eugen Schiffer as President of the German Central Administration of Justice, he served from 1949 to 1951 as President of the Association of Democratic Lawyers, and was from October 1949 to July 1953 Minister of Justice of the newly created GDR.

In an interview to Neues Deutschland, the official party newspaper of East Germany, on 30 June 1953, he voiced his opposition to the prosecution of workers who had taken part in the 17 June strike. Consequently, he was denounced as an "enemy of the state and the party", lost his ministerial charge, was expelled from the SED and arrested. After a two-year-long detention without charge in the Stasi headquarters at Hohenschönhausen, he was sentenced to eight years of prison by the Supreme Court. He was however released on 24 June 1956, and two days later amnestied. In June 1958, he was reinstated as a SED member.

Fechner received in 1967 the Patriotic Order of Merit, and in 1972 the Karl Marx Order, the highest honor in the GDR. He died, aged 81, in Schöneiche, Brandenburg in 1973.

== Publications ==
- How could it happen? Berlin, 1945.
- The nature and role of the new democratic self-government, Berlin, 1948.
