= Lothar Bolz =

German politician

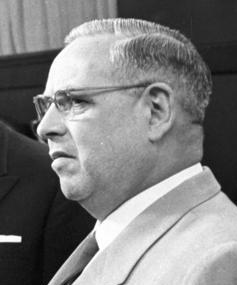

Deputy Head of Government
- In office 16 November 1950 – 21 September 1964

Minister of Foreign Affairs of the German Democratic Republic
- In office July 1953 – 24 June 1965
- Preceded by: Anton Ackermann
- Succeeded by: Otto Winzer

Minister of Construction of the German Democratic Republic
- In office 7 October 1949 – 19 November 1954
- Preceded by: Office established
- Succeeded by: Heinz Winkler

Chairman of the National Democratic Party of East Germany
- In office 1948–1972
- Preceded by: Office established
- Succeeded by: Heinrich Homann

Personal details
- Born: 3 September 1903 Gleiwitz, Province of Silesia, Prussia, German Empire
- Died: 28 December 1986 (aged 83) East Berlin, German Democratic Republic
- Party: National Democratic Party of Germany (NDPD)
- Profession: Lawyer, politician

Lothar Bolz (3 September 1903 – 28 December 1986) was an East German politician. From 1953 to 1965 he served as Minister of Foreign Affairs of East Germany (GDR).

== Biography ==
Lothar Bolz was born in Gleiwitz in Upper Silesia, now Poland, on 3 September 1903. His father was a watchmaker.

He studied law at the universities of Breslau and Kiel. After his study he worked as a lawyer in Breslau In 1930, he joined the Communist Party of Germany. After the Nazis came to power in 1933 he was no longer allowed to work as a lawyer because of his political affiliation. Bolz went to Moscow, finding work as a teacher at the Marx–Engels–Lenin Institute. From 1941 to 1945 he was headteacher of the anti-fascist school, which aimed to indoctrinate German prisoners of war against fascism. During his stay in the Soviet Union, he became a Soviet citizen and retained dual citizenship.

In 1947, he returned to Germany and joined the East German Socialist Unity Party, but in 1948 he founded the Communist-sponsored National Democratic Party of Germany (NDPD). Many members of the NDPD were former Nazis and former Wehrmacht officers. From 1948 to 1972 he was the chairman of the NDPD. In 1949 he became a member of the People's Chamber (Parliament) and from 1949 to 1953 he was the Minister of Construction. From 1950 to 1967 he was one of the Deputy Prime Ministers of the GDR. In 1953, being the successor of Foreign Minister Anton Ackermann. He stayed in the office until 1965. From 1950 to his death he was a member of the Presidium of the National Front. He also acted as the chairman of Society for German-Soviet Friendship from 1968 to 1978.

Bolz died on 28 December 1986 in East Berlin at the age of 83.
