= State Planning Commission (East Germany) =

Central state authority of East Germany

- Staatliche Plankommission
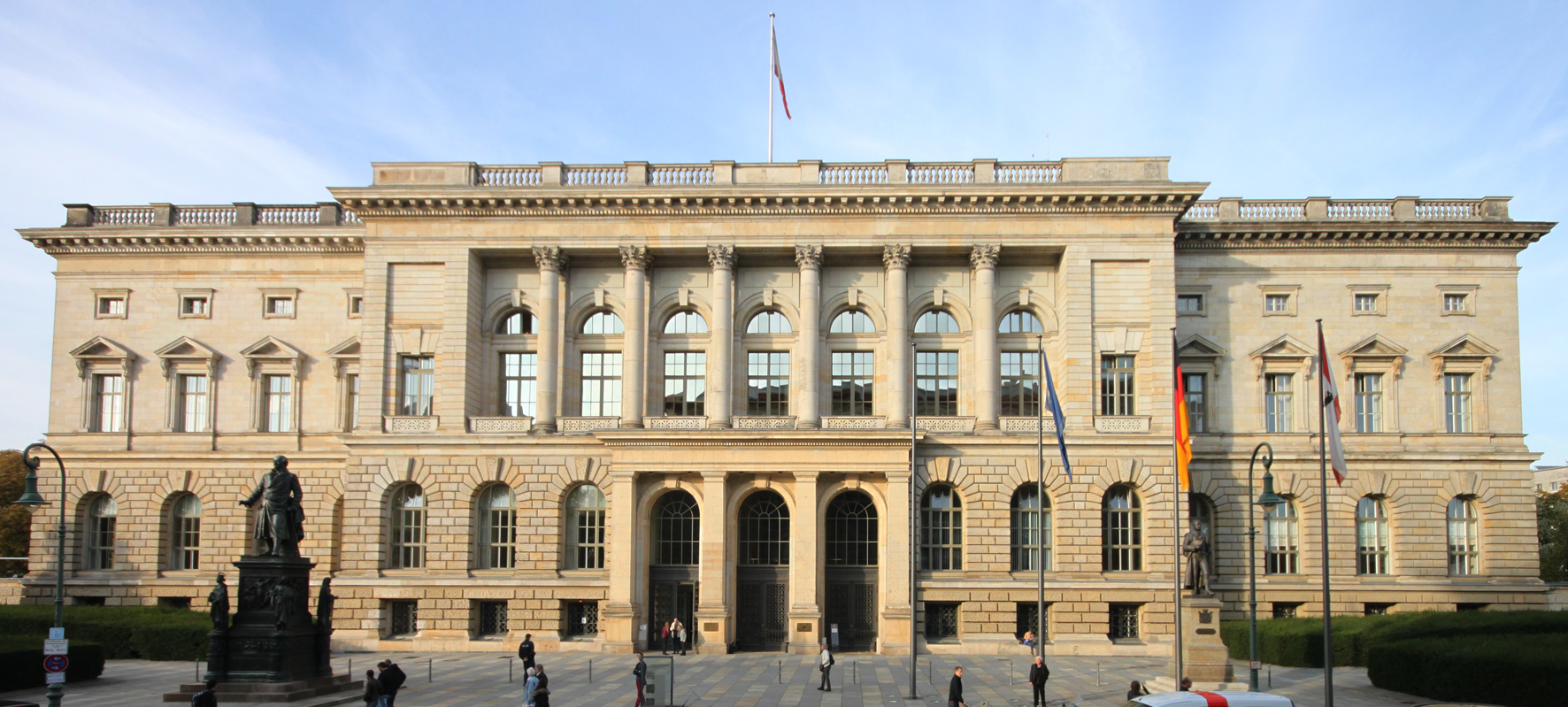
- The Prussian Landtag building, seat of the SPK since 1961, in 2014

Agency overview
- Formed: 7 October 1949 as the Ministry of Planning
- Preceding agency: German Economic Commission
- Dissolved: 30 May 1990 as Wirtschaftskomitee für die Durchführung einer Wirtschaftsreform
- Superseding agency: Ministry of the Economy
- Jurisdiction: East Germany
- Headquarters: Haus der Ministerien II, Leipziger Straße 5–7, East Berlin, East Germany
- Employees: 2,000 (1980s)
- Minister responsible: Gerhard Schürer, Chairman
- Parent agency: Council of Ministers (de jure); Planning and Finance Department of the SED Central Committee (de facto)

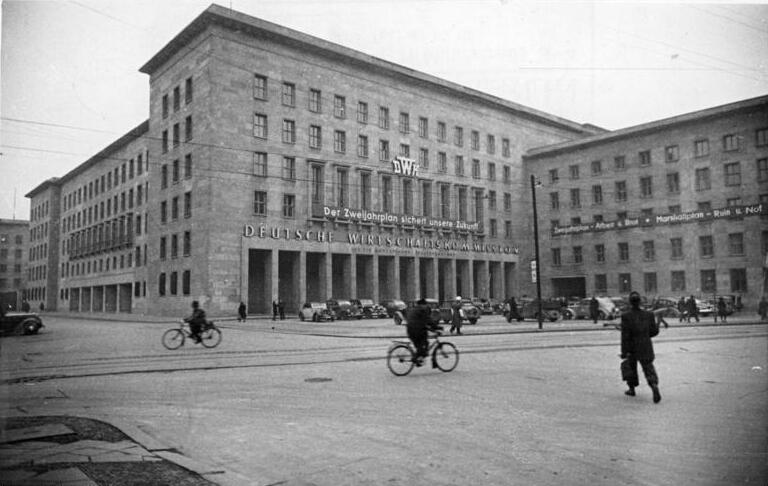
SPC office in Berlin

The State Planning Commission (SPC) (German: Staatliche Plankommission) was a central state authority of the GDR Council of Ministers for planning, coordinating and proportional development of all sectors of the economy, public education and other areas of public life in the districts and for solving the most important economic tasks. In the central administrative economy of the GDR, it was responsible for the coordination, elaboration and control of the medium-term perspective plans (five-year plan) and the annual economic plans derived from them.

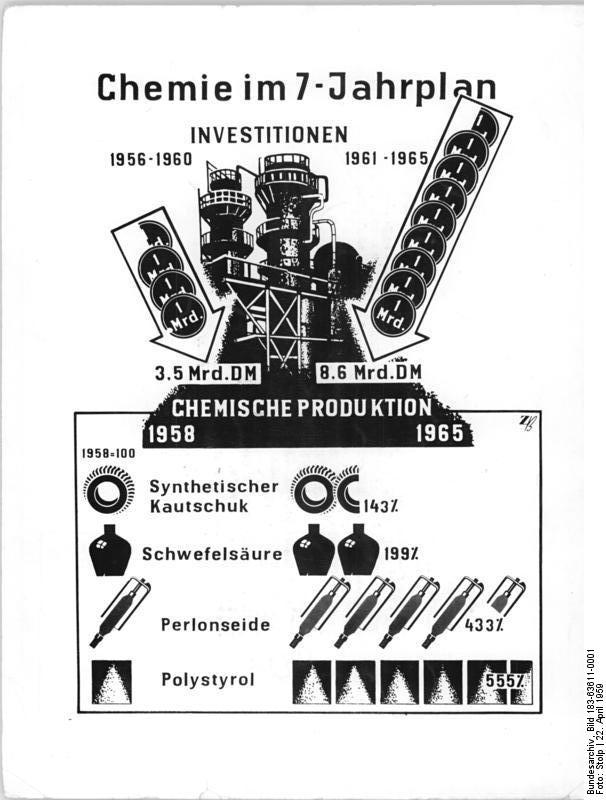
Seven year plan infographics by SPC

Heinrich Rau was the first chairman of SPC in 1950–1952.

== Overview ==
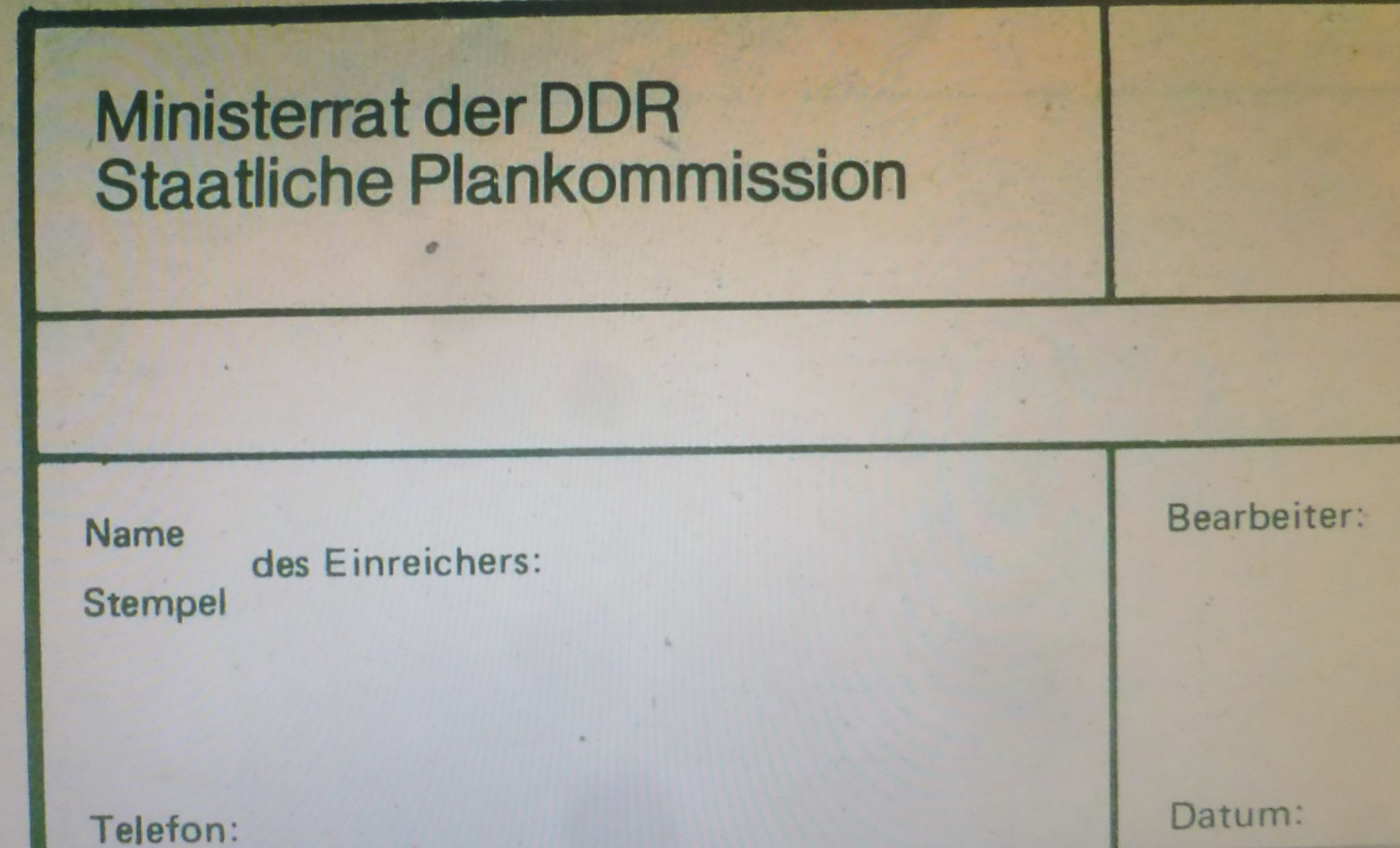
Official blank by SPC

The State Planning Commission emerged from the Ministry of Planning in 1950.

The state-owned enterprises, agricultural production cooperatives, etc. — each had to defend their plans in front of the planning commission responsible for them. The companies had to regularly document the implementation of the planned services with a large number of plan indicators. Monitoring the fulfillment of the plan was carried out at all levels in parallel by the party organs of the Socialist Unity Party of Germany, which were authorized to issue instructions to the state leaders.

The annual national economic plan passed by the People's Chamber had the force of law. Verifiable violations of the plan discipline could lead to sanctions (fines) for the company. Since almost all company leaders were also members of the Socialist Unity Party of Germany, they could be expelled from the party as a result of not delivering of the state plans.

At the intergovernmental level, the SPC coordinated the plans of the GDR with the countries of the Comecon Block. For this purpose the East German government agreements were concluded within the framework of socialist economic integration.

The SPC was based in the former building of the Prussian Landtag (state parliament) at the address Leipziger Straße 5–7 in East Berlin's Mitte district .

== Chairmen ==
The chairmen of the State Planning Commission had ministerial rank and usually also served as Deputy Chairman of the Council of Ministers and were full or candidate (in case of Schürer) members of the SED Politburo.

No.	Portrait	Name	Took office	Left office	Party
Minister for Planning
1	Heinrich Rau	Heinrich Rau (1899–1961)	7 October 1949	8 November 1950	SED
Chairman of the State Planning Commission
1	Heinrich Rau	Heinrich Rau (1899–1961)	8 November 1950	23 May 1952	SED
2	Bruno Leuschner	Bruno Leuschner (1910–1965)	23 May 1952	6 July 1961	SED
3	Karl Mewis	Karl Mewis (1907–1987)	6 July 1961	12 January 1963	SED
4	Erich Apel	Erich Apel (1917–1965)	12 January 1963	3 December 1965†	SED
5	Gerhard Schürer	Gerhard Schürer (1921–2010)	22 December 1965	11 January 1990	SED
Chairman of the Economic Committee of the Council of Ministers
6	Karl Grünheid	Karl Grünheid (1931–2004)	11 January 1990	April 1990	SED
