= Potsdam – Potsdam-Mittelmark II – Teltow-Fläming II =

Federal electoral district of Germany

61 Potsdam – Potsdam-Mittelmark II – Teltow-Fläming II
- Electoral district for the Bundestag
- Potsdam – Potsdam-Mittelmark II – Teltow-Fläming II in 2025
- State: Brandenburg
- Population: 302,700 (2019)
- Electorate: 232,797 (2021)
- Major settlements: Potsdam
- Area: 556.2 km^{2}

Current electoral district
- Created: 1990
- Party: SPD
- Member: Olaf Scholz
- Elected: 2021, 2025

Potsdam – Potsdam-Mittelmark II – Teltow-Fläming II is an electoral constituency (German: Wahlkreis) represented in the Bundestag. It elects one member via first-past-the-post voting. Under the current constituency numbering system, it is designated as constituency 61. It is located in western Brandenburg, comprising the city of Potsdam and small parts of the Potsdam-Mittelmark and Teltow-Fläming districts.

Potsdam – Potsdam-Mittelmark II – Teltow-Fläming II was created for the inaugural 1990 federal election after German reunification. Since 2021, it has been represented by the former Chancellor of Germany, Olaf Scholz of the Social Democratic Party (SPD).

== Geography ==
Potsdam – Potsdam-Mittelmark II – Teltow-Fläming II is located in western Brandenburg. As of the 2021 federal election, it comprises the independent city of Potsdam as well as the municipalities of Kleinmachnow, Michendorf, Nuthetal, Schwielowsee, Stahnsdorf, and Teltow from the Potsdam-Mittelmark district and the Ludwigsfelde municipality from the Teltow-Fläming district.

== History ==
Potsdam – Potsdam-Mittelmark II – Teltow-Fläming II was created after German reunification in 1990, then known as Potsdam. It acquired its current name in the 2002 election. In the 1990 through 1998 elections, it was constituency 276 in the numbering system. In the 2002 and 2005 elections, it was number 61. In the 2009 election, it was number 62. Since the 2013 election, it has been number 61.

Originally, the constituency comprised the independent city of Potsdam and a few surrounding municipalities in the district of Potsdam-Land (abolished in 1993). It acquired its current configuration in the 2002 election, when it took on many more municipalities from the Potsdam-Mittelmark district and a few from the Teltow-Fläming district. Upon the abolition of the Fahrland Amt ahead of the 2005 election, the former municipality of Seeburg was transferred out of the constituency. At the same time, it gained the former municipalities of Derwitz and Groß Schulzendorf. Because of a growing population in Potsdam itself, it lost the municipalities of Blankenfelde-Mahlow and Rangsdorf in the 2009 election, the municipality of Großbeeren in the 2017 election and the large municipality of Werder (Havel) with 27.000 people in the 2021 election.

Election	No.	Name	Borders
1990	276	Potsdam	Potsdam city; Potsdam-Land district (only eastern municipalities)
1994	276	Potsdam	Potsdam city; Potsdam-Land district (only eastern municipalities)
1998	276	Potsdam	Potsdam city; Potsdam-Land district (only eastern municipalities)
2002	61	Potsdam – Potsdam-Mittelmark II – Teltow-Fläming II	Potsdam city; Potsdam-Mittelmark district (only Kleinmachnow, Michendorf, Nuthetal, Schwielowsee, Stahnsdorf, and Teltow municipalities); Teltow-Fläming district (only Blankenfelde-Mahlow, Großbeeren, Ludwigsfelde, and Rangsdorf municipalities)
2005	61	Potsdam – Potsdam-Mittelmark II – Teltow-Fläming II	Potsdam city; Potsdam-Mittelmark district (only Kleinmachnow, Michendorf, Nuthetal, Schwielowsee, Stahnsdorf, and Teltow municipalities); Teltow-Fläming district (only Blankenfelde-Mahlow, Großbeeren, Ludwigsfelde, and Rangsdorf municipalities)
2009	62	Potsdam – Potsdam-Mittelmark II – Teltow-Fläming II	Potsdam city; Potsdam-Mittelmark district (only Kleinmachnow, Michendorf, Nuthetal, Schwielowsee, Stahnsdorf, and Teltow municipalities); Teltow-Fläming district (only Großbeeren and Ludwigsfelde municipalities)
2013	61	Potsdam – Potsdam-Mittelmark II – Teltow-Fläming II	Potsdam city; Potsdam-Mittelmark district (only Kleinmachnow, Michendorf, Nuthetal, Schwielowsee, Stahnsdorf, and Teltow municipalities); Teltow-Fläming district (only Großbeeren and Ludwigsfelde municipalities)
2017	61	Potsdam – Potsdam-Mittelmark II – Teltow-Fläming II	Potsdam city; Potsdam-Mittelmark district (only Kleinmachnow, Michendorf, Nuthetal, Schwielowsee, Stahnsdorf, Teltow, and Werder (Havel) municipalities); Teltow-Fläming district (only Ludwigsfelde municipality)
2021	61	Potsdam – Potsdam-Mittelmark II – Teltow-Fläming II	Potsdam city; Potsdam-Mittelmark district (only Kleinmachnow, Michendorf, Nuthetal, Schwielowsee, Stahnsdorf, and Teltow municipalities); Teltow-Fläming district (only Ludwigsfelde municipality)
2025	61	Potsdam – Potsdam-Mittelmark II – Teltow-Fläming II	Potsdam city; Potsdam-Mittelmark district (only Kleinmachnow, Michendorf, Nuthetal, Schwielowsee, Stahnsdorf, and Teltow municipalities); Teltow-Fläming district (only Ludwigsfelde municipality)

== Members ==
Due to the dominance of Potsdam, Potsdam – Potsdam-Mittelmark II – Teltow-Fläming II has been a stronghold of the Social Democratic Party (SPD), which won the constituency in every election except in the 2013 CDU landslide.

The constituency was first represented by former GDR Minister for Posts and Telecommunications Emil Schnell (SPD) from 1990 to 2002, followed by Andrea Wicklein from 2002 to 2013. The constituency was won by the Christian Democratic Union (CDU) in the 2013 election, and represented by Katherina Reiche. She resigned in 2015 to become CEO of the Association of Local Utilities (VKU). In the 2017 election, SPD candidate Manja Schüle was elected. She resigned in November 2019 after being appointed to the state government of Brandenburg. Vice-Chancellor and SPD lead candidate Olaf Scholz was elected in 2021 and re-elected in 2025.

Election	Member	Party	%
1990	Emil Schnell	SPD	34.0
1994	Emil Schnell	SPD	42.0
1998	Emil Schnell	SPD	41.1
2002	Andrea Wicklein	SPD	41.8
2005	Andrea Wicklein	SPD	40.7
2009	Andrea Wicklein	SPD	28.7
2013	Katherina Reiche	CDU	32.6
2017	Manja Schüle	SPD	26.1
2021	Olaf Scholz	SPD	34.0
2025	Olaf Scholz	SPD	21.8

== Election results ==
=== 2025 election ===
Federal election (2025): Potsdam – Potsdam-Mittelmark II – Teltow-Fläming II
Notes:	Blue background denotes the winner of the electorate vote. Pink background denotes a candidate elected from their party list. Yellow background denotes an electorate win by a list member, or other incumbent. A ✓ or ✗ denotes status of any incumbent, win or lose respectively.						
Party	Candidate	Votes	%	±%	Party votes	%	±%
SPD	✓ Olaf Scholz	43,336	21.8	▼12.3	34,040	17.1	▼9.9
CDU	Tabea Gutschmidt	40,930	20.6	▲6.8	38,263	19.2	▲5.2
AfD	Alexander Tassis	37,823	19.0	▲9.8	36,947	18.5	▲8.6
Greens	Annalena Baerbock	31,619	15.9	▼2.9	29,115	14.6	▼4.4
Left	Isabelle Vandre	27,524	13.8	▲6.0	29,408	14.7	▲4.6
BSW					16,658	8.3	New
FDP	Linda Teuteberg	7,959	4.0	▼4.9	8,599	4.3	▼6.4
Volt					2,403	1.2	▲0.7
FW	Michael Reichert	3,905	2.0	▲0.1	1,852	0.9	▼0.7
PARTEI					1,605	0.8	▼0.7
BD	Marco Schulz	1,372	0.7	New	621	0.3	New
Independent	Hermann Krämer	685	0.3	New			
Independent	Edmund Müller	551	0.3	▲0.1			
MLPD					123	0.1	0.0
Informal votes		1,616			1,091		
Total valid votes		199,109			199,634		
Turnout		200,725	85.7	▲3.8			
SPD hold	Majority	2,406	1.2	▼14.0			

=== 2021 election ===
Federal election (2021): Potsdam – Potsdam-Mittelmark II – Teltow-Fläming II
Notes:	Blue background denotes the winner of the electorate vote. Pink background denotes a candidate elected from their party list. Yellow background denotes an electorate win by a list member, or other incumbent. A ✓ or ✗ denotes status of any incumbent, win or lose respectively.						
Party	Candidate	Votes	%	±%	Party votes	%	±%
SPD	Olaf Scholz	64,271	34.0	▲7.6	50,965	27.0	▲8.5
Greens	Annalena Baerbock	35,452	18.8	▲10.5	35,865	19.0	▲8.9
CDU	Saskia Ludwig	26,050	13.8	▼10.3	26,287	13.9	▼10.4
AfD	Tim Krause	17,302	9.2	▼3.0	18,658	9.9	▼3.4
FDP	Linda Teuteberg	16,872	8.9	▲1.4	20,210	10.7	▲1.5
Left	Norbert Müller	14,701	7.8	▼8.9	19,110	10.1	▼8.2
Tierschutzpartei					4,562	2.4	▲0.5
FW	Andreas Menzel	3,439	1.8	▲0.5	3,115	1.6	▲0.8
PARTEI	Orson Baecker	3,367	1.8	▼0.7	2,795	1.5	▼0.3
dieBasis	Dorit Rust	3,019	1.6		2,977	1.6	
Volt	Benjamin Körner	1,004	0.5		1,022	0.5	
Independent	Lu Yen Roloff	845	0.4				
Pirates					705	0.4	
Unabhängige					613	0.3	
ÖDP	Daniel Margraf	804	0.4		575	0.3	▲0.1
Team Todenhöfer					469	0.2	
Humanists	Lukas Minogue	458	0.2		368	0.2	
Independent	Edmund Müller	442	0.2				
Independent	Ingo Charnow	393	0.2				
DKP	Frank Ehrhardt	369	0.2	▼0.1	271	0.1	0.0
NPD					239	0.1	▼0.2
MLPD					79	0.0	0.0
Independent	Antje Grütte	57	0.0				
Informal votes		1,702			1,662		
Total valid votes		188,845			188,885		
Turnout		190,547	81.9	▲2.4			
SPD hold	Majority	28,819	15.2	▲14.0			

=== 2017 election ===
Federal election (2017): Potsdam – Potsdam-Mittelmark II – Teltow-Fläming II
Notes:	Blue background denotes the winner of the electorate vote. Pink background denotes a candidate elected from their party list. Yellow background denotes an electorate win by a list member, or other incumbent. A ✓ or ✗ denotes status of any incumbent, win or lose respectively.						
Party	Candidate	Votes	%	±%	Party votes	%	±%
SPD	Manja Schüle	50,588	26.1	▼6.2	35,773	18.5	▼6.5
CDU	Saskia Ludwig	48,095	24.9	▼7.4	48,015	24.8	▼6.3
Left	Norbert Müller	31,840	16.5	▼3.9	35,106	18.1	▼2.9
AfD	René Springer	23,890	12.3		26,133	13.5	▲7.8
Greens	Annalena Baerbock	15,549	8.0	▲0.8	19,079	9.8	▲0.7
FDP	Linda Teuteberg	14,425	7.5	▲5.7	17,768	9.2	▲5.9
PARTEI		4,575	2.4		3,410	1.8	
Tierschutzpartei					3,656	1.9	
FW		2,484	1.3		1,606	0.8	▲0.3
BGE					1,073	0.6	
Pirates		1,041	0.5	▼2.5			
NPD					682	0.4	▼0.8
DM					662	0.3	
DKP		551	0.3		328	0.2	
Independent	Müller	472	0.2				
ÖDP					432	0.2	
MLPD					146	0.1	▼0.1
Informal votes		2,292			1,933		
Total valid votes		193,510			193,869		
Turnout		195,802	79.1	▲4.7			
SPD gain from CDU	Majority	2,493	1.2				

=== 2013 election ===
Federal election (2013): Potsdam – Potsdam-Mittelmark II – Teltow-Fläming II
Notes:	Blue background denotes the winner of the electorate vote. Pink background denotes a candidate elected from their party list. Yellow background denotes an electorate win by a list member, or other incumbent. A ✓ or ✗ denotes status of any incumbent, win or lose respectively.						
Party	Candidate	Votes	%	±%	Party votes	%	±%
CDU	Katherina Reiche	58,399	32.6	▲8.6	56,449	31.4	▲9.9
SPD	✗ Andrea Wicklein	57,669	32.2	▲3.5	44,723	24.9	▼1.2
Left	Norbert Müller	35,914	20.0	▼8.5	37,294	20.7	▼4.7
Greens	Annalena Baerbock	12,903	7.2	▼2.5	16,241	9.0	▼1.7
AfD					10,282	5.7	
Pirates	Cornelius Everding	5,445	3.0		4,814	2.7	▼0.4
FDP	Jacqueline Krüger	3,200	1.8	▼5.5	5,900	3.3	▼7.3
NPD	Florian Stein	3,147	1.8	0.0	2,067	1.1	▼0.1
Independent	Rolf Hercher	1,243	0.7				
FW					1,045	0.6	
Independent	Christoph Hörstel	719	0.4				
PRO					610	0.3	
Independent	Edmund Ernst Müller	500	0.3				
MLPD					265	0.1	0.0
REP					207	0.1	0.0
Informal votes		3,088			2,330		
Total valid votes		179,139			179,897		
Turnout		182,227	74.4	▲1.6			
CDU gain from SPD	Majority	730	0.4				

=== 2009 election ===
Federal election (2009): Potsdam – Potsdam-Mittelmark II – Teltow-Fläming II
Notes:	Blue background denotes the winner of the electorate vote. Pink background denotes a candidate elected from their party list. Yellow background denotes an electorate win by a list member, or other incumbent. A ✓ or ✗ denotes status of any incumbent, win or lose respectively.						
Party	Candidate	Votes	%	±%	Party votes	%	±%
SPD	✓ Andrea Wicklein	48,720	28.7	▼12.2	44,450	26.0	▼11.4
Left	Rolf Kutzmutz	48,515	28.6	▲2.3	43,354	25.4	▲1.4
CDU	Katherina Reiche	40,708	24.0	▲2.6	36,600	24.4	▲2.8
Greens	Cornelia Behm	16,479	9.7	▲5.0	18,279	10.7	▲1.9
FDP	Jan Syré	12,356	7.3	▲3.8	17,986	10.5	▲2.9
Pirates					5,171	3.0	
NPD	Dieter Woche	3,061	1.8	0.0	2,129	1.2	▼0.5
FWD					942	0.6	
DVU					939	0.6	
BüSo					345	0.2	
REP					269	0.2	
MLPD					202	0.1	▼0.1
Informal votes		4,387			3,560		
Total valid votes		169,839			170,666		
Turnout		174,226	72.8	▼6.6			
SPD hold	Majority	205	0.1	▼14.5			

=== 2005 election ===
Federal election (2005):Potsdam – Potsdam-Mittelmark II – Teltow-Fläming II
Notes:	Blue background denotes the winner of the electorate vote. Pink background denotes a candidate elected from their party list. Yellow background denotes an electorate win by a list member, or other incumbent. A ✓ or ✗ denotes status of any incumbent, win or lose respectively.						
Party	Candidate	Votes	%	±%	Party votes	%	±%
SPD	✓ Andrea Wicklein	81,092	40.7	▼1.1	74,114	37.2	▼7.8
Left	Rolf Kutzmutz	51,050	25.6	▲0.4	47,059	23.6	▲5.3
CDU	Katherina Reiche	43,923	22.1	0.0	38,068	19.1	▼0.8
Greens	Joachim Gessinger	9,323	4.6	▼0.5	17,332	8.7	▲0.8
FDP	Heinz Lanfermann	7,159	3.6	▼0.8	15,653	7.8	▲1.8
NPD	Detlef Appel	3,661	1.8		3,644	1.8	▲0.8
Familie	Manuela Berlich	3,079	1.5	▲0.4			
GRAUEN					1,965	1.0	▲0.4
50Plus The Generation-Alliance					1,259	0.6	
MLPD					391	0.2	
Informal votes		3,158			2,869		
Total valid votes		199,196			199,485		
Turnout		202,354	79.6	▲1.2			
SPD hold	Majority	30,042	15.1				

Bundestag
Preceded by Vorpommern-Rügen – Vorpommern-Greifswald I	Constituency represented by the chancellor 2021-2025	Succeeded by Hochsauerlandkreis
