= East Germany–Palestine relations =

- East Germany: Palestine

East Germany–Palestine relations refer to foreign relations that existed between East Germany and the State of Palestine.

This includes formal and informal relations, covering political relations, economic relations, military relations, and social/cultural relations. The relations span a limited time frame, as the GDR only lasted between 1949 and 1990.

The GDR was founded as a state in 1949, one year after the Nakba and the creation of the State of Israel in 1948. The State of Palestine had therefore just undergone a major transformation in territory. This means that the relations discussed on this page involve two states that were very new and changed and were reliant on external factors. The GDR was heavily impacted by the Warsaw Pact and the Hallstein Doctrine, and Palestine was regarded and engaged with through the UN Resolution 181.

In the context of the GDR, there was often influences from West Germany (FRG) and legacy factors from the Third Reich. This involves policy such as the engagement with reparations to the State of Israel, as well as how imperialism and anti-Zionism was approached.

== History of Political Relations ==
In 1950's, East German party and state leaders only took limited note of Palestine and focused more on Algeria oriented solidarity.

The Hallstein Doctrine from 1955 stated that West Germany would only engage diplomatically with States that did not recognize or have ties with the GDR.

In 1958, the East German ministry of foreign affairs (MfAA) claimed that all decisions in regards to the Palestine question, should be in accordance with the decisions of the UN. East Germany connected itself with anti-imperialist and anti-colonial causes all over the world and offered the Palestinians solidarity, yet while the SED presented itself as very Pro-Palestine, they were weary of fully aligning themselves politically.

In 1965, the FRG officially established diplomatic ties with Israel, causing Arab States to break off their own ties with the FRG. This lifted the pressure the Hallstein doctrine had put on the GDR and the Arab World in regards to relation, and offered opportunity for state relations. While the FRG had informal relations to Palestine, the GDR had official diplomatic contacts with the Palestinian Liberation Organization, the PLO.

After the Six-Day War all countries of the Eastern Bloc with the exception of Romania broke off diplomatic relations with Israel. Their position strongly influenced the approach of the East German government toward Israel. The GDR condemned the "imperialist aggression of Israel" and accused "the United States and West Germany of being accomplices to the aggressor". Resolutions from SED meetings and communiqués signed by East German officials stressed the "GDR's firm solidarity with the Arab states in the anti-imperialist struggle, especially in repelling Israeli aggression and overcoming its consequences".

The 1967 war also changed the territories, meaning many Palestinians that resided in the GDR, no longer had the right to return.

In March 1968, the GDR spoke out in favor of "regaining the legitimate rights of the Arab-Palestinian people," advocating such positions well ahead of its ideological allies from Moscow.

The SED's notion of Zionism was summed up in an internal document compiled by the State Secretariat for Church Affairs in 1972 as a "reactionary-nationalist ideology of the Jewish big bourgeosie".

In 1972, the Munich Olympic Attacks occurred, leading to deportations of Palestinians around the FRG. Some of these Palestinians were accepted into the GDR.

In 1975, East Germany voted in favour of U.N resolution condemning Zionism as a form of racism and racial discrimination. This was propagated by the East German media, with the teachers' union Deutsche Lehrezeitung asserting that "there is a common ideological platform between Zionism and Fascism. It is racism". and articles condemning "aggressive and chauvinist Zionism".

On June 22, 1990, the first freely elected People's Chamber adopted a statement apologizing "in all form from the anti-Israeli and anti-Zionist policy practiced in this country for decades."

East Germany stopped existing in 1990 with the German reunification. For contemporary information, see Germany-Palestine Relations.

== Economic Relations ==
The first time that East Germany sent aid in the form of medication and other provisions to the UNRWA was in 1989, worth 80,000 Deutschmark.

== Military Relations ==
From the early 1970s, East Germany cooperated with Arab countries and the Palestine Liberation Organization at a military level. Military and security advisers were especially active in Libya, Syria and South Yemen. The PLO played an important role in all East German political strategies concerning the Middle East. The first official agreement between the SED and the PLO was signed during Yasser Arafat's visit to East Berlin in August 1973. The agreement included the opening of a PLO office in East Berlin - its first office in Eastern Europe. Furthermore, the supply of "non-civilian goods" to the PLO was arranged. In September 1973, PLO leader Yasser Arafat was received by Erich Honecker in East Berlin, and a PLO representation was established in East Berlin, which was given the diplomatic rank of an embassy in 1982. In the GDR reading, the Palestinians were among the peoples oppressed by Western imperialism, who were waging an anti-colonial liberation struggle, a view also held by parts of the West German left. In the 1980s, despite the friendship between Arafat and Honecker, a distancing from the PLO occurred when the GDR sided with the Syrian dictator Hafez al-Assad, who was at odds with Arafat. The GDR supported the PLO and later other Palestinian groups financially as well as with weapons, and also trained fighters.

In the Yom Kippur War, East Germany supplied Syria with 75,000 grenades, 30,000 mines, 62 tanks and 12 fighter jets.

== Social and Cultural Relations ==
Palestinians living in the GDR consisted mostly of students on scholarship that were either PLO aligned or aligned with directly supported socialist parties. Palestinian students were admitted to GDR institutions from the 1960's onward. Other groups of Palestinians in the GDR consisted of labor migrants that migrated in the beginning of the 1960's from Jordan.

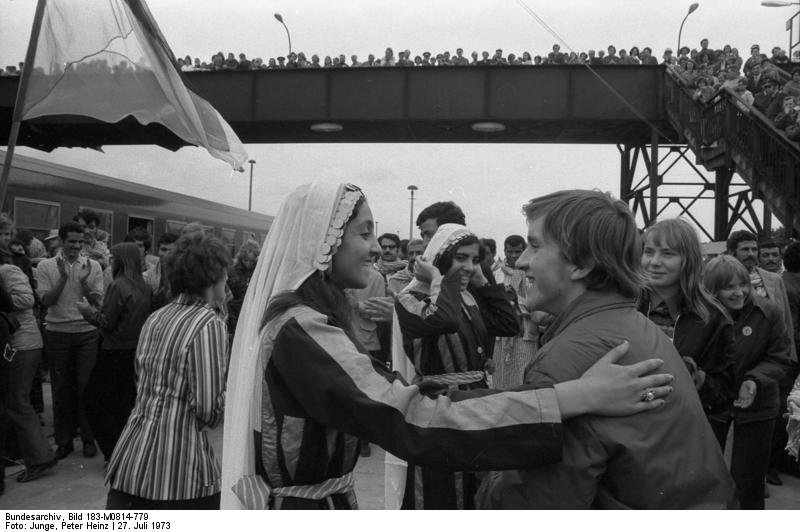
Palestinian participants in the 10th World Festival of Youth and Students wearing traditional clothing and Palestine flag in the background

In 1973, the 10th World Festival of Youth and Students took place in the GDR. This was a festival aimed at highlighting the internationalism present in the GDR, and amongst other socialist countries and movements. Yasser Arafat was in attendance and in a documentary produced by DEFA, many attendees are to be seen representing Palestine or wearing kuffiyehs.

In Palestine, newsletters reported of East German solidarity, as some sources show.

There were also relations and shows of solidarity between movement groups of the two states; one example being a letter sent to the General Conference of the General Federation of Palestinian Women held in Beirut in 1974 by the East German Women's Democratic Association.

== See also ==
- Foreign relations of East Germany
- Foreign relations of Germany
- Foreign relations of Palestine
- International recognition of Palestine
- East Germany–Israel relations
- Germany-Palestine Relations.
