= 4th Council of Ministers of the German Democratic Republic =

Government of the German Democratic Republic

Fifth cabinet of Otto Grotewohl Cabinet Grotewohl V (1963-1964) Cabinet Stoph I (1964-1967)
- 4th government of the German Democratic Republic

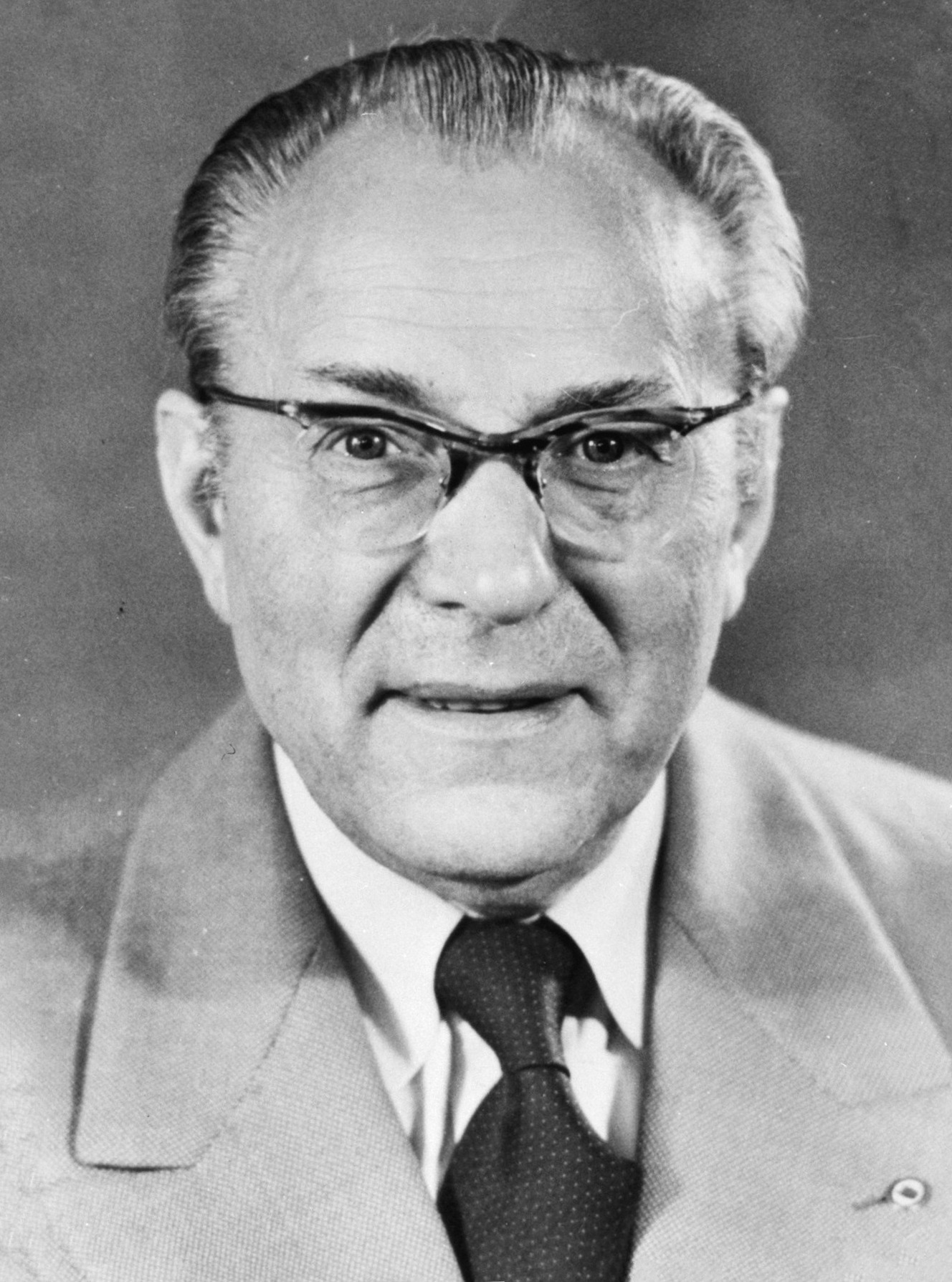
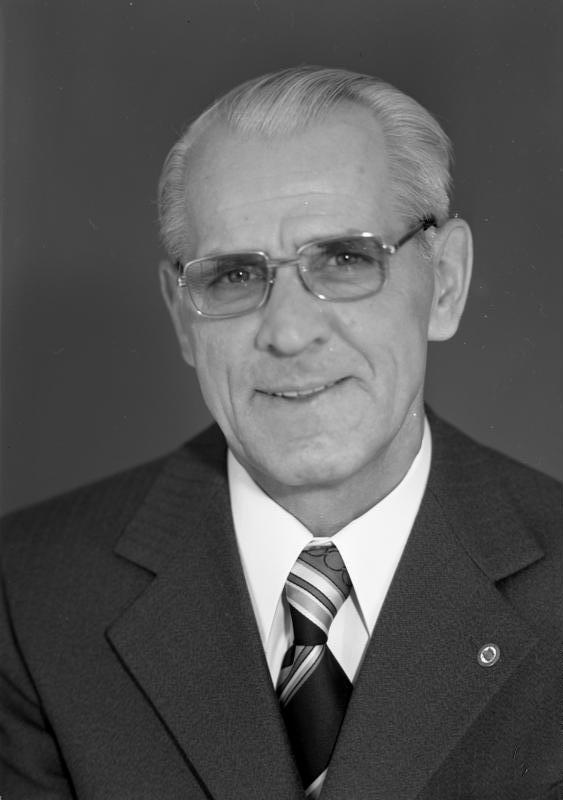
- Date formed: 14 November 1963
- Date dissolved: 14 July 1967

People and organisations
- Head of government: Otto Grotewohl (until 21 September 1964); Willi Stoph (after 21 September 1964)
- No. of ministers: 22

History
- Predecessor: Grotewohl III
- Successor: Stoph II

The following overview lists the ministers and state secretaries of the 4th Council of Ministers of th GDR from 14 November 1963, to 14 July 1967.

== Ministries ==
The government consisted of:

Portfolio	Minister	Took office	Left office	Party
Chairman	Otto Grotewohl	14 November 1963	21 September 1964	SED
Chairman	Willi Stoph	24 September 1964	14 July 1967	SED
First Deputy Chairman	Willi Stoph	14 November 1963	24 September 1964	SED
Deputy Chairman	Alexander Abusch	14 November 1963	14 July 1967	SED
Deputy Chairman	Erich Apel	14 November 1963	3 December 1965	SED
Deputy Chairman	Margarete Wittkowski	14 November 1963	14 July 1967	LDPD
Deputy Chairman	Max Sefrin	14 November 1963	14 July 1967	CDU
Deputy Chairman	Lothar Bolz	14 November 1963	14 July 1967	NDPD
Deputy Chairman	Paul Scholz	14 November 1963	14 July 1967	DBD
Deputy Chairman	Bruno Leuschner	14 November 1963	10 February 1965	SED
Deputy Chairman	Max Suhrbier	14 November 1963	22 December 1965	LDPD
Deputy Chairman	Kurt Wünsche	22 December 1965	14 July 1967	LDPD
Minister of Construction	Wolfgang Junker	14 November 1963	14 July 1967	SED
Minister for Finance	Willy Rumpf	14 November 1963	12 December 1966	SED
Minister for Finance	Siegfried Böhm	12 December 1966	14 July 1967	SED
Minister of Foreign Affairs	Lothar Bolz	14 November 1963	29 June 1965	NDPD
Minister of Foreign Affairs	Otto Winzer	29 June 1965	14 July 1967	SED
Minister for the Interior	Friedrich Dickel	14 November 1963	14 July 1967	SED
Minister for Justice	Hilde Benjamin	14 November 1963	14 July 1967	SED
Minister of Post and Telecommunications	Rudolph Schulze	14 November 1963	14 July 1967	CDU
Minister for Public Education	Margot Honecker	14 November 1963	14 July 1967	SED
Minister of State Security	Erich Mielke	14 November 1963	14 July 1967	SED
Minister for Foreign Trade	Julius Balkow	14 November 1963	29 June 1965	SED
Minister for Foreign Trade	Horst Sölle	29 June 1965	14 July 1967	SED
Minister of Transport	Erwin Kramer	14 November 1963	14 July 1967	SED
Minister of Health	Max Sefrin	14 November 1963	14 July 1967	CDU

== Ministry-level Committees ==
Portfolio	Minister	Took office	Left office	Party
Chairman of the State Planning Commission	Erich Apel	14 November 1963	3 December 1965	SED
Chairman of the State Planning Commission	Gerhard Schürer	3 December 1965	14 July 1967	SED
Chairman of the People's Economic Council	Alfred Neumann	14 November 1963	22 December 1965	SED
Chairman of the Agricultural Council	Georg Ewald	14 November 1963	14 July 1967	SED
Minister and Chairman of the Workers' and Peasants' Inspection	Heinz Matthes	14 November 1963	14 July 1967	SED

== Sources ==
- Herbert Hömig (1985). "Loch, Hans". Neue Deutsche Biographie (in German). Vol. 14. Berlin: Duncker & Humblot. pp. 742–743. (full text online).
- Wer war wer in der DDR?
- Carl Steinhoff: erster DDR-Innenminister : Wandlungen eines bürgerlichen Sozialisten / Lutz Maeke
- "BIOGRAPHISCHE DATENBANKEN". election.de (in German).
- Gesetz über die Regierung der DDR: Online-Veröffentlichung, retrieved 10 January 2018
- Gesetz über die Bildung eines Ministeriums für Staatssicherheit: http://www.verfassungen.de/de/ddr/mfsbildung50.htm Online-Veröffentlichung, retrieved 10 January 2018.

Government offices
Preceded by Grotewohl II	Cabinets of the German Democratic Republic; 14 November 1963-14 July 1967	Succeeded by Stoph II
