= Saarmund station =

Railway station in Brandenburg, Germany

Saarmund
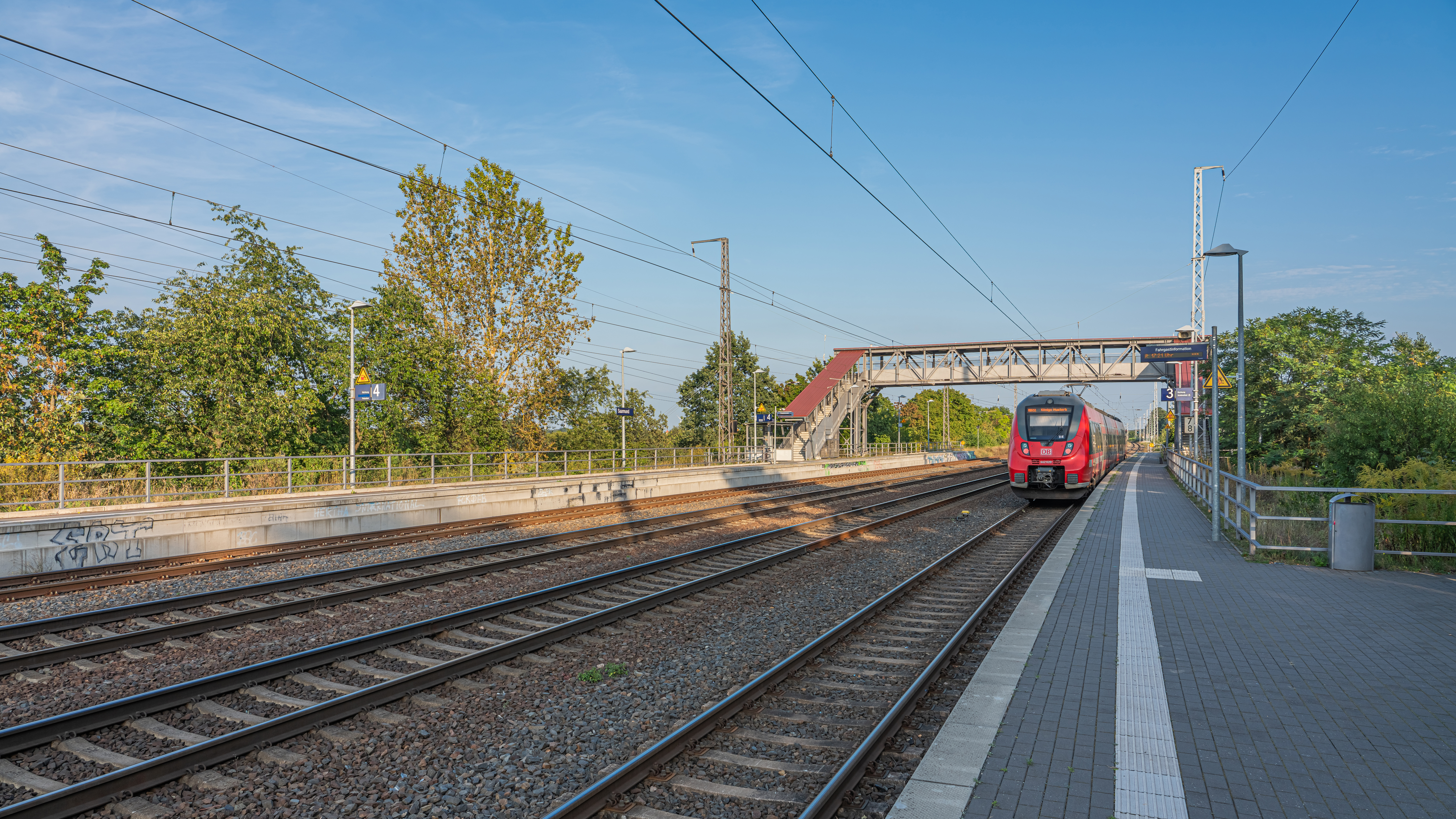
- 2023

General information
- Location: Mühlenstraße; 14558 Saarmund; Brandenburg; Germany
- Coordinates: 52.3236°N 13.1396°E
- System: Bf
- Owner: Deutsche Bahn
- Operator: DB Station&Service
- Line: Berlin outer ring
- Platforms: 2 side platforms
- Tracks: 4

Construction
- Parking: yes
- Cycle facilities: no
- Accessible: partly

Other information
- Station code: 5459
- DS100 code: BSAM
- IBNR: 8081220
- Category: 6
- Fare zone: VBB: Berlin C and Potsdam C/6051
- Website: www.bahnhof.de

History
- Opened: 1 April 1918; 108 years ago

Services
Preceding station	DB Regio Nordost	Following station
Ludwigsfelde-Struveshof towards Königs Wusterhausen	RB 22	Potsdam Pirschheide towards Potsdam Griebnitzsee
Location
- Location within Brandenburg Location within Germany Location within Europe

Saarmund station (German: Bahnhof Saarmund) is a railway station in the municipality of Nuthetal in the Potsdam-Mittelmark district of Brandenburg, Germany. It is served by the line RB 22.
