= Rudolph Schulze =

German politician (1918–1996)

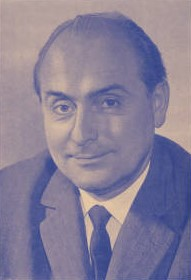
- Schulze in 1968

Minister of Posts and Telecommunications
- In office 1963–1989
- Preceded by: Friedrich Burmeister
- Succeeded by: Klaus Wolf

Member of the Volkskammer
- In office 1958–1990

Personal details
- Born: November 18, 1918 Chemnitz, Germany
- Died: November 26, 1996 (aged 78) Zepernick, Germany
- Citizenship: East Germany
- Party: Christian Democratic Union
- Awards: Patriotic Order of Merit; Banner of Labor; Hero of Labour (1988)

Rudolph Schulze (18 November 1918 - 26 November 1996) was a German politician who served as Deputy Chairman of the Council of Ministers and Minister of Post and Telecommunications of East Germany.

== Biography ==
The son of a pharmacist, Schulze completed an apprenticeship as a pharmacist after attending high school from 1934 to 1937 and worked as a pharmacist in Chemnitz until 1939. He was conscripted into the Wehrmacht for military service in 1939, he served as a non-commissioned officer in a medical company until 1945 and from October that year he became a Soviet prisoner of war until 1948, then studying at a party school which provided rehabilitation to former prisoners of war.

In 1948, he joined the Christian Democratic Union branch in East Germany, initially working as an administrative clerk and briefly as mayor of Schwarzenberg in 1950. From 1950 to 1951, he was a member of the Saxon State Parliament and, from 1950 to 1952, Minister of Trade and Supply for the State of Saxony. He then served as Deputy Chairman of the Leipzig District Council until 1955 and President of the East German Chamber of Industry and Commerce until 1958.

In 1954, Schulze became a member of the Political Affairs Committee and then a member of the Presidium of the CDU Executive Board. From 1958 to 1990, he was a member of the Volkskammer, East Germany's parliament. From 1958 to 1963, he served as General Director of Intercontrol. From 1963 at the IV Grotehwol Government up to 1989, he served as Minister of Posts and Telecommunications of East Germany. As minister he was involved in the construction of the Fernsehturm Berlin in Alexanderplatz, East Berlin. In 1968 he demanded his West German counterpart Werner Dollinger to pay debts which he claimed are due to East Germany giving postal services to West Berlin. He was one of the few CDU politicians to serve in a generally SED dominant Council of Ministers. From 1969 to 1989, he also served as president of the GDR-Africa Friendship Society and a member of the Presidium of the League for Friendship between Peoples. From December 1971 to November 1989, he was Deputy Chairman of the Council of Ministers. In May 1989, not long before the reunification of Germany, he participated in the Free German Youth parade. Schulze was buried on December 3, 1996, in Zepernick.
