= Katherina Reiche =

German politician (born 1973)

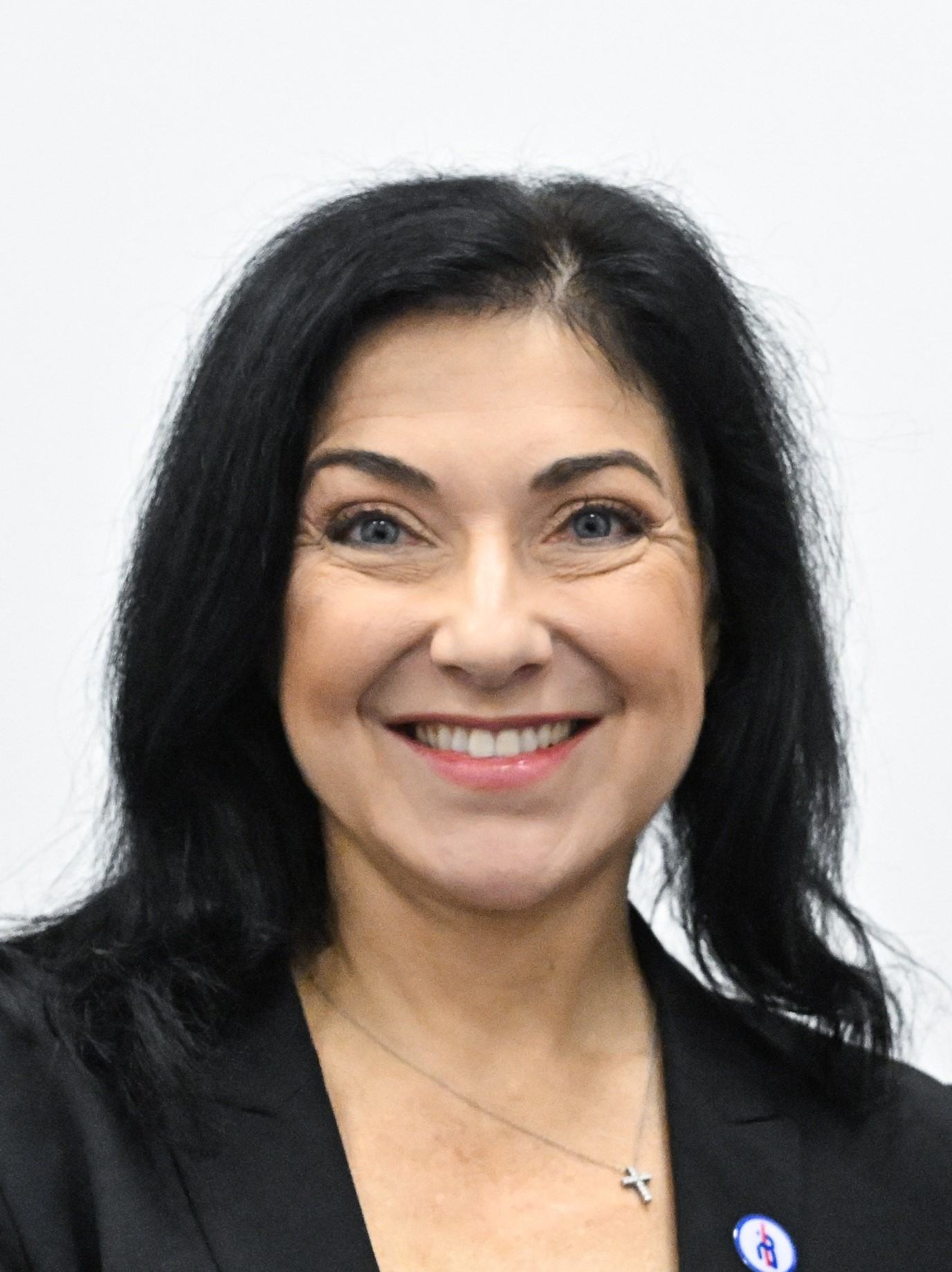
- Reiche in 2025

Minister for Economic Affairs and Energy
- Incumbent
- Assumed office 6 May 2025
- Chancellor: Friedrich Merz
- Preceded by: Robert Habeck (as Minister of Economic Affairs and Climate Action)

Parliamentary State Secretary to the Federal Ministry of Transport and Digital Infrastructure
- In office 17 December 2013 – 4 September 2015
- Minister: Alexander Dobrindt
- Preceded by: Jan Mücke
- Succeeded by: Enak Ferlemann

Parliamentary State Secretary to the Federal Ministry for the Environment, Nature Conservation and Nuclear Safety
- In office 28 October 2009 – 17 December 2013
- Minister: Norbert Röttgen; Peter Altmaier
- Preceded by: Michael Müller
- Succeeded by: Rita Schwarzelühr-Sutter

Deputy Chairperson of the CDU/CSU parliamentary group
- In office 2005–2009
- Chancellor: Angela Merkel

Member of the Bundestag; from Brandenburg
- In office 26 October 1998 – 4 September 2015
- Preceded by: Multi-member district
- Succeeded by: Manja Schüle (2017)
- Constituency: State list (1998–2013); Potsdam – Potsdam-Mittelmark II – Teltow-Fläming II (2013–2015)

Personal details
- Born: 16 July 1973 (age 53) Luckenwalde, East Germany
- Party: Christian Democratic Union (since 1992)
- Spouse: Sven Petke (m. 2003; sep. 2025)
- Domestic partner: Karl-Theodor zu Guttenberg (since 2025)
- Children: 3
- Education: University of Potsdam; Clarkson University
- Occupation: Chemist, Politician
- Website: katherina-reiche.de

Katherina Reiche (German: [katəˌʁiːna ˈʁaɪ̯çə]; born 16 July 1973) is a German manager and politician of the Christian Democratic Union (CDU) who has been serving as Federal Minister for Economic Affairs and Energy in the cabinet of Chancellor Friedrich Merz since May 2025.

From 1998 to 2015, she was a member of the German Bundestag, serving from 2005 to 2009 as one of the deputy chairpersons of the CDU/CSU parliamentary group. From 2009 to 2013, she was Parliamentary State Secretary to the Federal Minister for the Environment, Nature Conservation and Nuclear Safety, and from 2013 to 2015, Parliamentary State Secretary to the Federal Minister for Transport and Digital Infrastructure. In September 2015, she resigned her seat in the Bundestag.

== Education ==
After receiving her Abitur in 1992, she studied chemistry at the University of Potsdam, Clarkson University in New York and the University of Turku in Finland, where she received her diploma in 1997.

== Political career ==
=== Early beginnings ===
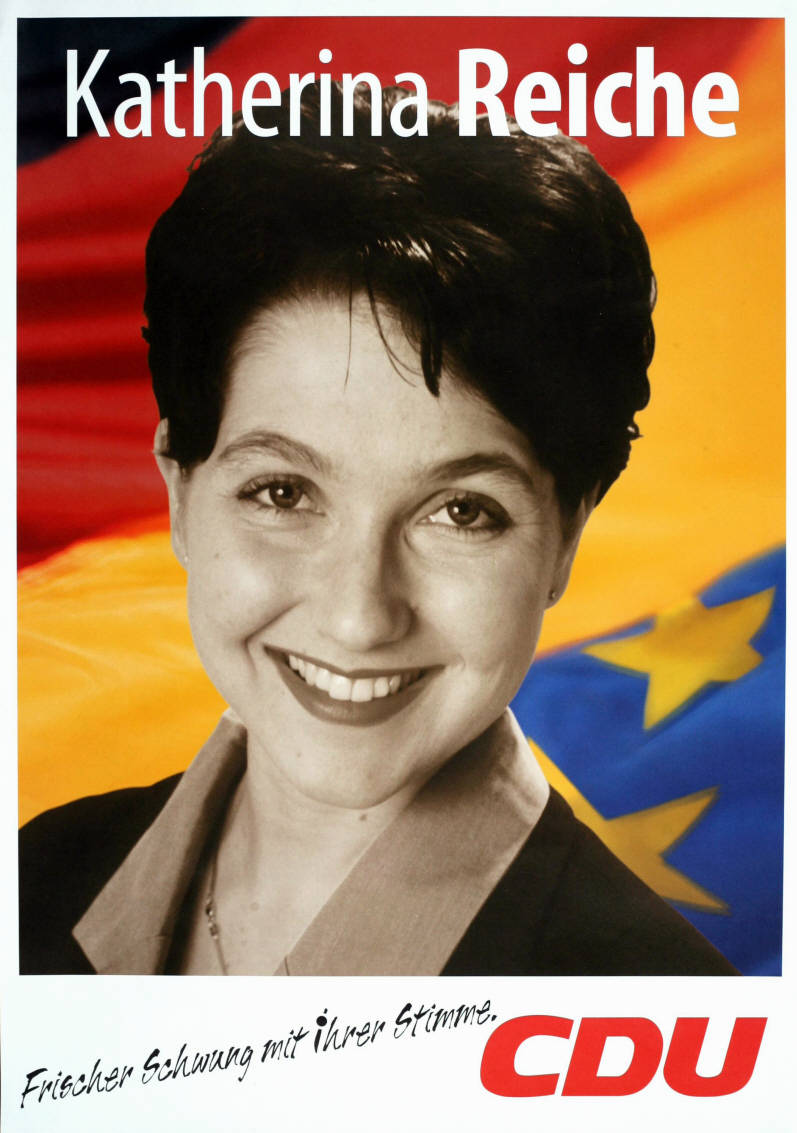
Reiche on a 1998 election poster

In 1992, Reiche was one of the founding members of the Ring Christlich-Demokratischer Studenten (Association of Christian-Democrat Students, RCDS) in Potsdam and in the same year she joined the Young Union (JU). Since 1996 she has also been a member of the CDU.

=== Member of the German Parliament (1998–2015) ===
In 2000 Reiche became a member of the federal executive of the CDU. From 2001 to 2015, she was also part of the party's executive board in the state of Brandenburg.

During the election campaign in 2002, Reiche was part of the CDU/CSU's competence team appointed by then-chancellor candidate Edmund Stoiber as an expert on women, youth, and family policies. This decision was criticized by conservative circles inside the two parties because Reiche was an unmarried mother at that point in time.

From 2005 until 2009, Reiche served as deputy chairwoman of the CDU/CSU's parliamentary group, under the leadership of chairman Volker Kauder. In this capacity, she was in charge of overseeing the policy areas Education and Science as well as Environment, Nature Conservation and Nuclear Safety.

In the negotiations to form a coalition government following the 2009 federal elections, Reiche was part of the working group on the environment, agriculture, and consumer protection, led by Ilse Aigner and Michael Kauch.

=== Career in government ===
In the government of Chancellor Angela Merkel, Reiche first served as Parliamentary State Secretary at the Federal Ministry for the Environment, Nature Conservation and Nuclear Safety under successive ministers Norbert Röttgen (2009-2012) and Peter Altmaier (2012-2013) from 2009 to 2013. Following the 2013 elections, she was named Parliamentary State Secretary at the Federal Ministry of Transport and Digital Infrastructure, this time under the leadership of minister Alexander Dobrindt.

On the occasion of the sixtieth anniversary of the diplomatic relations between Germany and India, Reiche participated in the first joint cabinet meeting of the two countries' governments in Delhi in May 2011.

== Career in the energy sector ==
In 2015, Reiche resigned from her government office and laid down her parliamentary mandate to become Chief Executive Officer of the German Association of Local Utilities (VKU). In this capacity, she was unanimously elected President of the European Centre of Enterprises with Public Participation and of Enterprises of General Economic Interest (CEEP) in June 2016.

From 2018 until 2019, Reiche also served on the German government's so-called coal commission, which was tasked to develop a masterplan before the end of the year on how to phase-out coal and create a new economic perspective for the country's coal-mining regions.

In late 2019, Reiche moved to a new position at German energy company E.ON, where she led its subsidiary Westenergie from 2020 to 2025.

Since June 2020, she has been the chairwoman of the National Hydrogen Council of the Federal Government.

== Other activities ==
=== Corporate boards ===
- KfW, Ex-Officio Member of the Supervisory Board (since 2025)
- Ingrid Capacity, Member of the Supervisory Board (since 2025)
- Schaeffler Group, Member of the Supervisory Board (since 2023)
- NRW.Bank, Member of the Advisory Board (since 2022)
- Vodafone Germany, Member of the Advisory Board on Sustainability (since 2020)

=== Non-profit organizations ===
- German Council for Sustainable Development (RNE), Member (2016–2022, appointed ad personam by Chancellor Angela Merkel)
- Deutsche Flugsicherung (DFS), Member of the Advisory Board
- Deutsches Museum, Member of the Board of Trustees
- Konrad Adenauer Foundation (KAS), Member
- Association of German Foundations, Member of the Parliamentary Advisory Board (until 2015)

== Political positions ==
In 2005, Reiche described the opponents of genetic engineering as "Bioterroristen" ("Bioterrorists"). She also criticized the two then-governing parties SPD and the Greens for trying to catch votes with this subject and stirring up the people's fears for the future.

In 2012, Reiche claimed same-sex marriage was a bigger threat to Germany than the Eurozone crisis. She was heavily criticized by LGBT groups for the remark.

== Personal life ==
Reiche is in a relationship with Karl-Theodor zu Guttenberg.
