= Andrea Wicklein =

German politician (born 1958)

Member of the Bundestag; from Brandenburg
- In office 17 October 2002 – 24 October 2017
- Preceded by: Emil Schnell
- Succeeded by: Multi-member district
- Constituency: Potsdam – Potsdam-Mittelmark II – Teltow-Fläming II (2002–2013); State list (2013–2017)

Personal details
- Born: Andrea Meta Köhler; 6 March 1958 (age 68) Babelsberg, East Germany
- Party: Social Democratic
- Education: Leipzig University

Andrea Wicklein (née Köhler; born 6 March 1958) is a German politician. She was a member of the Bundestag from 2002 to 2017, representing the Social Democratic Party (SPD).

== Political career ==
Wicklein joined the SPD in 1992 and entered the Bundestag in the 2002, 2005, and 2009 federal elections with a direct mandate from the constituency of Potsdam. From 2006 to 2009, she was spokeswoman for the SPD parliamentary group's building east working group.

In the 2013 federal election, she failed to obtain a direct mandate and instead entered parliament via the state list of the SPD. Wicklein no longer stood as a candidate in the 2017 federal election, citing a desire to spend more time with her family.
