= East Germany–Israel relations =

- East Germany: Israel

The State of Israel and the German Democratic Republic never had official diplomatic relations throughout the latter's nearly forty years of existence. Even after the fall of the Berlin Wall no ambassadors were exchanged. The official policy of East Germany emphasized the necessity to differentiate between Jews and the Israeli state. This approach, stemming originally from the theories of Marx and Lenin on nationalism, class struggle, and the "irreconcilable struggle between socialism and imperialism" also served to counter accusations of antisemitism. In this context, a specific relationship or responsibility of the German people to the Jewish state was denied. Relations can be divided into three periods: positive neutrality (1948–1956), confrontation (1956–1985) and movement towards rapprochement (1986–1990).

== History ==
=== Deterioration ===
According to the German translation of the complete works of Soviet leader Joseph Stalin, Stalin-Werke, published in East Berlin in 1950, Zionism was a "reactionary nationalistic movement that had its followers among the Jewish bourgeoisie, the intellectual elite and the backward strata of the Jewish mass of workers. The Zionists strove for the isolation of the Jewish mass of workers from the collective struggle of the proletariat."

But there was another, more international, immediate reason for the anti-Zionist course upon which the East German government embarked at the beginning of the 1950s – the accusations against the leading Czechoslovak party functionary, Rudolf Slánský. Slánský and his so-called "group" were accused in 1952 of a "Zionist conspiracy". On 20 December 1952, the Central Committee of the Socialist Unity Party of Germany (SED) proclaimed the "lessons from the trial against the group of plotters around Slánský". In this proclamation, the Central Committee issued the following statement:

Sailing under the Jewish nationalistic flag, and disguised as a Zionist organization and as diplomats of the American vassal government of Israel, these American agents practiced their trade. From the Morgenthau-Acheson Plan that was revealed during the trial in Prague it appears unmistakably that American imperialism organizes and supports its espionage and sabotage activities in the people's republics via the State of Israel with the assistance of Zionist organizations

After Stalin's death in 1953, the Israeli government showed some interest in establishing normal relations with the Eastern Bloc. As for East Germany, not only did the unresolved German question – the existence of two German states as members of the Eastern and Western alliances – preclude a positive approach, but so did the refusal of the SED to negotiate with Jewish and Israeli representatives on reparations. Bilateral talks took place in Moscow from 1954 until 1956. During this time all negotiations were closely linked to the question of material compensation to individuals for Nazi crimes committed against Jews, an issue also discussed in connection with the Luxembourg Agreement. An internal report by the East German Foreign Ministry in January 1963 noted "The relatively good relations with some Arab states must not be aggravated by striving to establish official relations with Israel, in the present stage of the struggle for the international recognition of the GDR".

=== Confrontation ===
Since the end of the 1950s, the attitude of the GDR leadership toward the Middle East conflict and the Palestinian question had become more and more pro-Arab and anti-Israeli. This shift became especially clear during Suez War, the Six-Day War, the Yom Kippur War and the Lebanon War. After the Six-Day War all countries of the Eastern Bloc with the exception of Romania broke off diplomatic relations with Israel. Their position strongly influenced the approach of the East German government toward Israel. The GDR condemned the "imperialist aggression of Israel" and accused "the United States and West Germany of being accomplices to the aggressor". Resolutions from SED meetings and communiqués signed by East German officials stressed the "GDR's firm solidarity with the Arab states in the anti-imperialist struggle, especially in repelling Israeli aggression and overcoming its consequences". In 1968, Simon Wiesenthal stated that East Germany's news service was far more anti-Israeli than that of other communist countries. On 14 July 1967, a cartoon appeared in the Berliner Zeitung, depicting a flying Moshe Dayan, with his hands stretched out toward Gaza and Jerusalem. Next to him stood Adolf Hitler in an advanced state of decomposition. He encouraged Dayan with the words: "Carry on, colleague Dayan!"

From the early 1970s, East Germany cooperated with Arab countries and the Palestine Liberation Organization at a military level. Military and security advisers were especially active in Libya, Syria and South Yemen. The PLO played an important role in all East German political strategies concerning the Middle East. The first official agreement between the SED and the PLO was signed during Yasser Arafat's visit to East Berlin in August 1973. The agreement included the opening of a PLO office in East Berlin - its first office in Eastern Europe. Furthermore, the supply of "non-civilian goods" to the PLO was arranged.

The SED's notion of Zionism was summed up in an internal document compiled by the State Secretariat for Church Affairs in 1972 as a "reactionary-nationalist ideology of the Jewish big bourgeosie".

The close cooperation between East Germany and the PLO was one reason why Israel objected to the GDR becoming a member of the UN in 1973. Israel's ambassador to the UN, Yosef Tekoah, stated in the General Assembly on September 18, 1973, that "Israel notes with regret and repugnance that the other German state (GDR) has ignored and continues to ignore Germany's historical responsibility for the Holocaust and the moral obligations arising from it. It has compounded the gravity of that attitude by giving support and practical assistance to the campaign of violence and murder waged against Israel and the Jewish people by Arab terror organizations".

In the Yom Kippur War East Germany supplied Syria with 75,000 grenades, 30,000 mines, 62 tanks and 12 fighter jets.

In 1975, East Germany voted in favour of U.N resolution condemning Zionism as a form of racism and racial discrimination. This was propagated by the East German media, with the teachers' union Deutsche Lehrerzeitung asserting that "there is a common ideological platform between Zionism and Fascism. It is racism". and articles condemning "aggressive and chauvinist Zionism".

In 1978, a member of the PLO Wadie Haddad died in East Berlin, in what is suspected to have been a Mossad assassination.

The official anti-Israeli foreign policy continued into the 1980s: The Israeli invasion of Lebanon in 1982 was denounced by the government as Israel's fifth war against the Arab states. This was bolstered by the National People's Army, which published a lengthy article in August 1982 likening Israeli aggression against the Palestinian and Lebanese people to the crimes of German Nazism in World War II and those of American imperialism against Vietnam.

The German Democratic Republic recognised the State of Palestine on 18 November 1988, but it later unified with the Federal Republic of Germany and the current government does not recognise it.

In a 1991 interview with Jack Koehler, an outraged Simon Wiesenthal revealed what he had learned since the 1989 Peaceful Revolution and German reunification about how his Nazi hunting investigations had been covertly and repeatedly stymied by the Stasi and the government of East Germany, which Wiesenthal accused of having been "the most antisemitic and anti-Israel in the entire Eastern Bloc." Wiesenthal explained, "They did nothing to help the West in tracking down Nazi war criminals, they ignored all requests from West German judicial authorities for assistance. We have just discovered shelves of files on Nazis stretching over four miles. Now we also know how the Stasi used those files. They blackmailed Nazi criminals who fled abroad after the war into spying for them."

== Reparations ==
The first article in Neues Deutschland that responded to the reparations agreement was not published until two months later, three days after excerpts of the indictment in the Slansky trial were printed. The article spoke of "a deal between powerful West German and Israeli capitalists" under the headline "Reparations- For Whom?". Leo Zuckermann participated in several talks with the Israeli consul to West Germany, Dr. Eliyahu Livne. In December 1952 he escaped to West Berlin, declaring that he was about to be arrested on the grounds of a "Zionist conspiracy". After Stalin died in March 1953, Israel hoped to negotiate reparations agreement with the East German government but the latter refused so.

== See also ==
- East Germany–Palestine relations
