= Emil Schnell =

German politician (born 1953)

Minister of Post and Telecommunications
- In office 12 April 1990 – 20 August 1990
- Minister-President: Lothar de Maizière
- Preceded by: Klaus Wolf
- Succeeded by: Hans-Jürgen Niehof (acting)

Member of the Bundestag
- In office 3 October 1990 – 17 October 2002
- Preceded by: Constituency established
- Succeeded by: Andrea Wicklein
- Constituency: Volkskammer (1990); Potsdam (1990–2002)

Member of the Volkskammer; for Potsdam
- In office 5 April 1990 – 2 October 1990
- Preceded by: Constituency established
- Succeeded by: Constituency abolished

Personal details
- Born: 10 November 1953 (age 72) Packebusch, East Germany
- Party: Social Democratic (since 1990)
- Other political affiliations: SPD in the GRR (1989–1990)
- Children: 2
- Education: Technical University of Magdeburg (Dr. rer. nat.)
- Occupation: Politician; Academic; Research Assistant

Emil Schnell (born 10 November 1953) is a German physicist and former politician of the Social Democratic Party of Germany (SPD).

He served as the GDR's last minister for post and telecommunications in the cabinet of Lothar de Maizière.

== Early life and education ==
From 1960 to 1968, Schnell attended the Polytechnic Secondary School, followed by completing his Abitur (university entrance qualification) in 1972. From 1972 to 1975, he served in the National People's Army (NVA).

He studied physics at the Technical University of Magdeburg from 1975 to 1980, earning a degree as a graduate physicist (Dipl.-Phys.).

Schnell then worked as a scientific assistant at the same university until 1983. Starting in 1983, he was a research associate at the Academy of Sciences of the GDR and completed his doctorate (Dr. rer. nat.) in 1984.

From 1988, he served as a department head at the Academy of Sciences' High-Pressure Research Institute in Potsdam.

== Political career ==
=== de Maizière Government ===
During the Peaceful Revolution, in October 1989, Schnell joined the newly reconstituted Social Democratic Party in the GDR. He became one of the founding members of the SPD in Potsdam, serving as its managing director during the 1990 election campaign.

In the first free elections in the GDR, Schnell was elected to the Volkskammer in March 1990 for Bezirk Potsdam, being the ninth-placed candidate on the SPD's list. He was thereafter appointed as minister for post and telecommunications in the cabinet of Lothar de Maizière.

During Schnell's tenure, the ministry focused on modernizing East Germany's postal and telecommunications infrastructure to align with West German standards. This initiative aimed to enhance private communication, support economic growth, and address the GDR's outdated systems, including long postal delivery times and a poorly developed telecommunications network. Significant investments were required, alongside efforts to integrate approximately 130,000 employees from the Deutsche Post of the GDR into the Deutsche Bundespost. Schnell additionally raised the postage against the resistance of other SPD ministers.

In August 1990, Schnell and all other SPD ministers resigned in the aftermath of de Maizière's dismissal of SPD finance minister Walter Romberg. Hans-Jürgen Niehof, one of Schnell's state secretaries, served as acting minister until German reunification.

=== Reunified Germany ===
Schnell was one of 144 Volkskammer members co-opted to the Bundestag following German reunification on 3 October 1990. He remained a member of the Bundestag until the end of the 14th legislative period in October 2002, retiring from politics. In the 1990, 1994, and 1998 federal elections, he won the direct mandate in the Potsdam constituency.

Schnell now lives as a freelance physicist in Potsdam. He is married and has two children.
