= Friedrich Burmeister (politician) =

German politician (1888–1968)

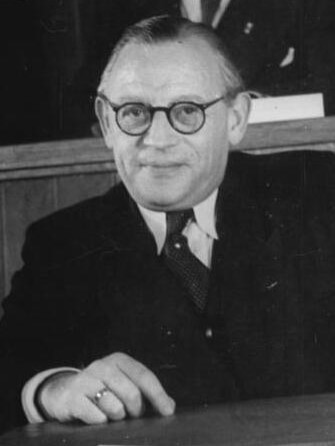
- Burmeister in 1950

Minister of Posts and Telecommunications
- In office 12 September 1949 – 1963
- Preceded by: Position established
- Succeeded by: Rudolph Schulze

Member of the Volkskammer
- In office 1949–1958

Personal details
- Born: March 24, 1888 Wittenberge, German Empire
- Died: July 25, 1968 (aged 80) East Berlin, East Germany
- Citizenship: East Germany
- Party: Christian Democratic Union
- Awards: Patriotic Order of Merit; Medal of Merit; Banner of Labor

Friedrich Burmeister (24 March 1888 in Wittenberge – 25 July 1968 in East Berlin) was minister for post and telecommunication in the DDR.

He was born in 1888 as the son of a locomotive driver, graduated from secondary school and entered the postal service as a postal assistant at the Schwerin Telegraph Office in 1905. After passing the postal assistant examination in 1909 and completing his military service in the First World War in an infantry and telecommunications unit, he initially worked as a postal assistant in Berlin-Reinickendorf in 1919. In the same year, he moved to the Schwerin Postal Directorate, where he rose to the rank of postal secretary and senior postal secretary in 1920, and postal inspector in 1924.

He was a member of the Republican Party of Germany (RPD) from 1922 to 1924 and of the German Democratic Party (DDP) from 1926 to 1930. From 1920 to 1933, Burmeister chaired the Mecklenburg-Schwerin regional cartel of the German Civil Service Association. In 1939, he was promoted to Senior Postal Inspector and transferred to Karlsbad, and from 1943 to the Reich Postal Directorate in Ústí nad Labem.

In 1945, he returned via Chemnitz to Schwerin, where he worked at the Senior Postal Directorate, and joined the Mecklenburg branch of the Christian Democratic Union (CDU). In 1945 and 1946, he served as Senior Postal Inspector, head of department, and deputy head of the Schwerin Senior Postal Directorate. From 1946 to 1949, he served as Minister of Labor and Social Affairs for the state of Mecklenburg, and then from September 12, 1949, to November 13, 1963, he served as Minister of Posts and Telecommunications of the GDR. At the same time, he was a member of the Volkskammer from 1949 to 1958 and a member of the CDU's Executive Board from 1950 to 1968.

Burmeister received the Patriotic Order of Merit in Silver on May 6, 1955, the Patriotic Order of Merit again in 1963, the Medal of Merit in 1959, the Banner of Labor in 1960 and the Honorary Clasp to the Patriotic Order of Merit in 1968.
