= Ludwigsfelde-Struveshof station =

Railway station in Germany

Ludwigsfelde-Struveshof
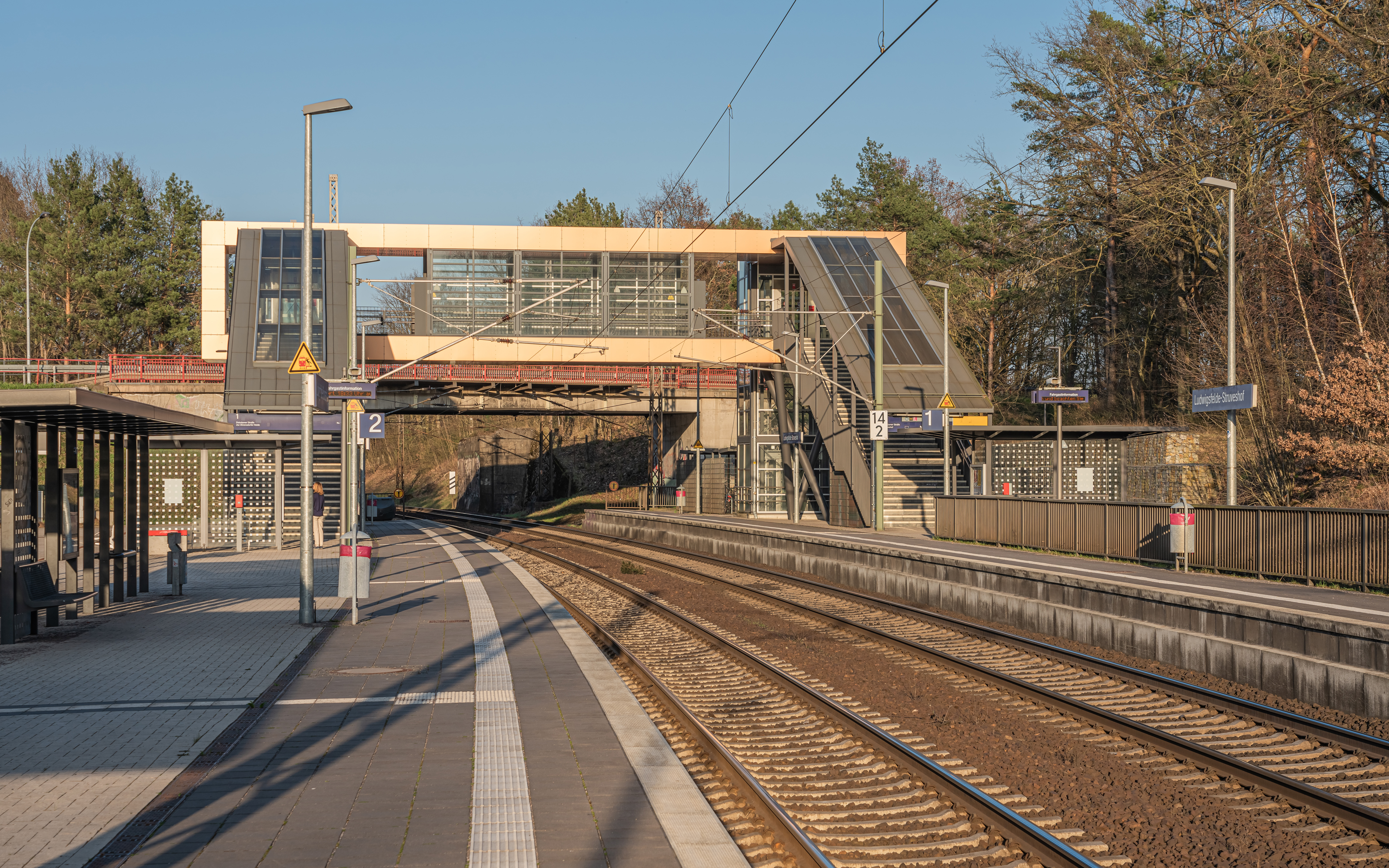

General information
- Location: Potsdamer Straße; 14974 Ludwigsfelde; Brandenburg; Germany
- Coordinates: 52.3172°N 13.2319°E
- Owner: Deutsche Bahn
- Operator: DB Netz; DB Station&Service
- Line: Berlin outer ring
- Platforms: 2 side platforms
- Tracks: 2
- Train operators: DB Regio Nordost
- Connections: 619 621 702 705 708 715 750 751

Construction
- Accessible: Yes

Other information
- Station code: 8240
- DS100 code: BSTH
- IBNR: 8012253
- Category: 6
- Fare zone: VBB: Berlin C/6053
- Website: www.bahnhof.de

History
- Opened: 9 December 2012; 13 years ago

Services
Preceding station	DB Regio Nordost	Following station
Saarmund towards Potsdam Griebnitzsee	RB 22	BER Airport towards Königs Wusterhausen
Location

Ludwigsfelde-Struveshof station is a railway station in the municipality of Ludwigsfelde in the Teltow-Fläming district of Brandenburg, Germany. It is served by the line RB 22.
