= Germany–Palestine relations =

- Germany: Palestine

Germany–Palestine relations are relations between the Federal Republic of Germany and the State of Palestine. Germany does not recognize Palestine diplomatically (See: International recognition of Palestine). However, Germany has a Representation Office in Ramallah, while there is also a Palestinian Mission in Berlin. There are numerous contacts between both societies, and Germany provides economic support to the Palestinian Territories through development partnerships. Germany is diplomatically committed to a two-state solution and has acted as a mediator in the Arab–Israeli conflict in the past.

== History ==
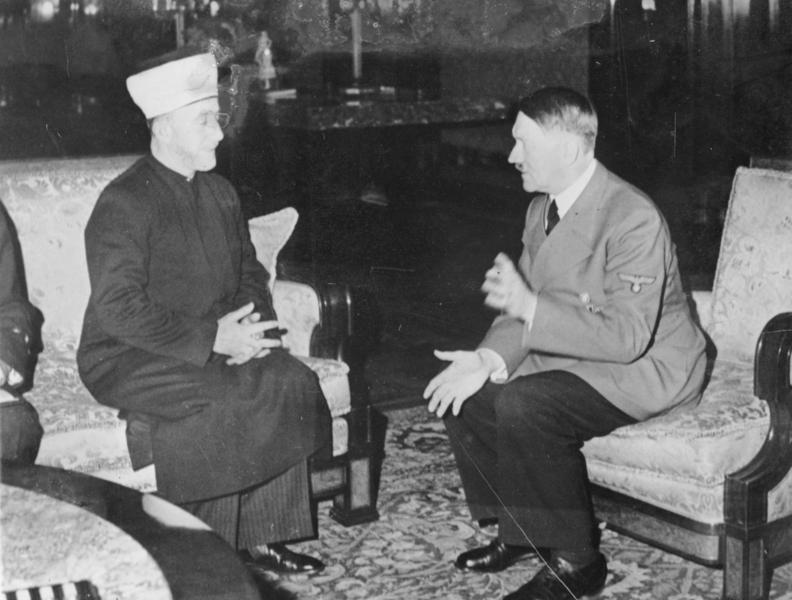
Amin al-Husseini and Adolf Hitler (1941)

From the year 1840, there was a Prussian Consulate in Palestine, which later passed to the German Empire. In the late 19th century, Jews from German-speaking countries also began to migrate to Palestine to pursue the zionist vision of Theodor Herzl. Also, some Christian German Templer colonies sprung up in Palestine in this time. At its height, the Templer community in Palestine numbered 2,000 people. During First World War, the Ottoman Empire, which then controlled Palestine, allied itself with Germany and its allies. After the defeat of the Central Powers, the League of Nations gave Britain a mandate to administer Palestine, and Germany had no official relations with the area until 1926. Until then, German representation was handled by the Spanish consulate. The coming to power of Adolf Hitler in Germany in 1933 led to a wave of emigration of German Jews, many of whom sought refuge in Palestine and joined settlers already there. The Grand Mufti of Jerusalem, Mohammed Amin al-Husseini, collaborated closely with the Nazis in the 1930s and also lived in Germany. Here he spread Nazi propaganda to the Arab world and urged Arabs to support the Germans. Nazi Germany also supported the uprising of the Palestinians against the British colonial power with funds and weapons. After the defeat of Germany, al-Husseini fled to Egypt and lost his status as leader of the Palestinian independence movement, but his antisemitic and antizionistic ideas strongly influenced later movements.

=== West Germany ===
In 1965, twenty years after the end of World War II, the Federal Republic of Germany (FRG) established diplomatic relations with Israel, which led to a severance of relations with the FRG on the part of the Arab states. The Six-Day War (referred to by Spiegel as "Israel's Blitzkrieg") led to a broad movement of solidarity on the part of the German left towards the Palestinians and the Palestinian Liberation Organization (PLO). Both West German left-wing extremists and neo-Nazis cooperated with Palestinian groups. German right-wing extremists such as Willi Voss assisted in the 1972 Munich Olympics assassination of the Israeli Olympic team. Voss later became a member of the PLO in Lebanon before defecting to the CIA. The Red Army Faction also maintained close ties with Palestinian groups, which extended to joint strategy papers and training camps. In 1976, German left-wing extremists, together with Palestinian terrorists, hijacked an Air France plane en route from Tel Aviv to Paris. In Operation Entebbe, the hostages were freed by Israeli special forces commando at Entebbe Airport. The Middle East conflict had a strong media presence in West Germany, and from the 1970s the PLO had an office in Germany. German Chancellor Helmut Kohl spoke out in favor of a Palestinian state in the 1980s.

=== East Germany ===
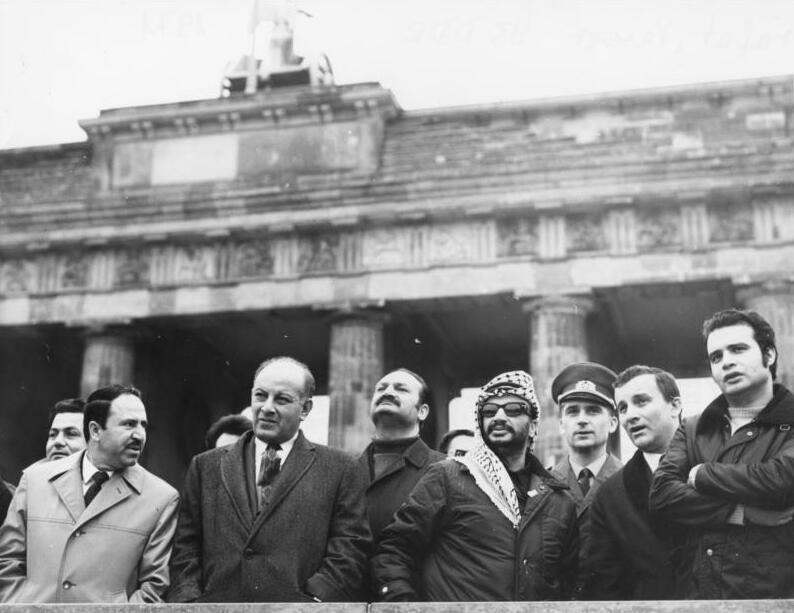
Yasser Arafat at the Brandenburg Gate (1971)

The German Democratic Republic (GDR) was among the first in supporting the Palestinians. In March 1968, the GDR spoke out in favor of "regaining the legitimate rights of the Arab-Palestinian people," advocating such positions well ahead of its ideological allies from Moscow. In September 1973, PLO leader Yasser Arafat was received by Erich Honecker in East Berlin, and a PLO representation was established in East Berlin, which was given the diplomatic rank of an embassy in 1982. In the GDR reading, the Palestinians were among the peoples oppressed by Western imperialism, who were waging an anti-colonial liberation struggle, a view also held by parts of the West German left. In the 1980s, despite the friendship between Arafat and Honecker, a distancing from the PLO occurred when the GDR sided with the Syrian dictator Hafez al-Assad, who was at odds with Arafat. The GDR supported the PLO and later other Palestinian groups financially as well as with weapons, and also trained fighters. On June 22, 1990, the first freely elected People's Chamber adopted a statement apologizing "in all form from the anti-Israeli and anti-Zionist policy practiced in this country for decades."

=== After German reunification ===
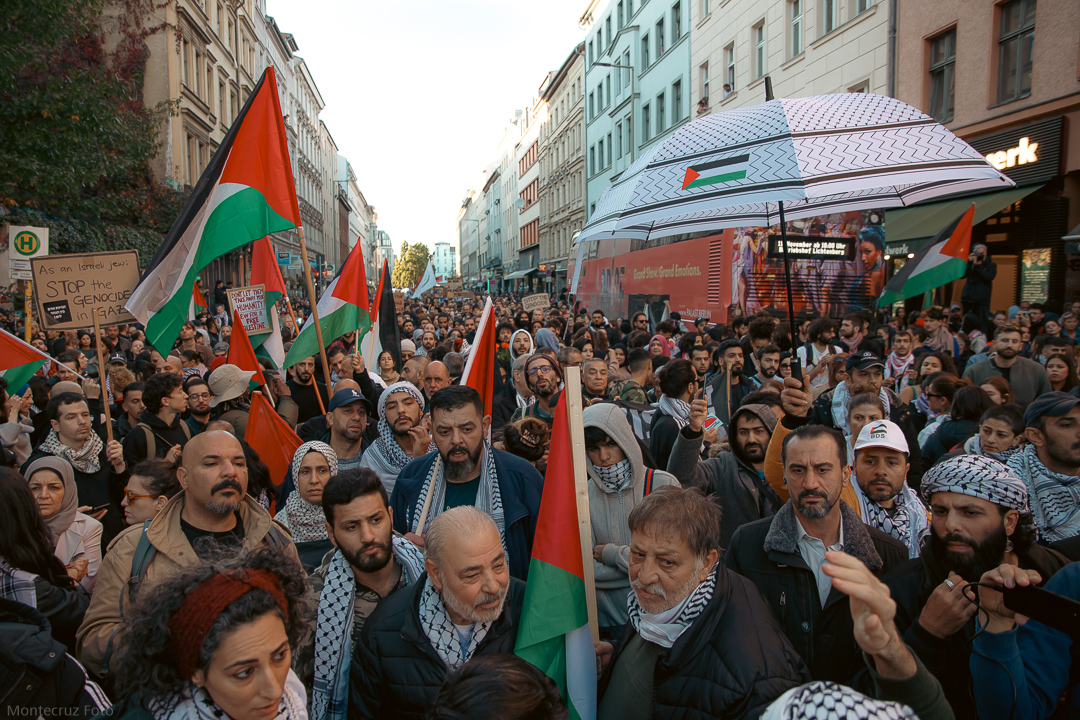
Pro-Palestine protest in Kreuzberg, Berlin, 21 October 2023

After the Oslo Peace Agreement of 1993 and the creation of the Palestinian Authority, relations with reunified Germany were put on a new footing. Several German foundations became active in Palestine and partnership agreements were signed between German and Palestinian cities. In 2001, German Foreign Minister Joschka Fischer mediated between Yasser Arafat and Israeli Prime Minister Ariel Sharon. Germany repeatedly spoke out in favor of reducing tensions in the conflict between Palestine and Israel and committed itself to a two-state solution. However, Germany refused to recognize the State of Palestine, which is recognized by more than two-thirds of UN member states. In the past, however, Germany's perceived closeness to Israeli positions often led to frustrations on the part of the Palestinians. Since the 2010s, Germany has followed a pro-Israel and anti-Palestinian foreign policy.

==== 2024 antisemitism resolution ====
In 2023, it was reported that Germany was "cracking down" on Palestinian solidarity, which has escalated since the start of the Gaza war. On 6 November 2024, the German parliament passed a piece of legislation titled "Never Again is Now: Protecting, Preserving and Strengthening Jewish Life in Germany," which was criticized by legal experts, civil society groups and prominent Jewish intellectuals. Amnesty International Germany said that the bill "not only fails to achieve this goal [of protecting Jewish people], but also raises fears of serious violations of fundamental human rights and legal uncertainty."

In December 2024, an open letter was signed by 4,600 people, demanding that Germany "effectively and immediately stop its complicity in the atrocity crimes committed by Israel in Palestine". The letter was delivered to German Chancellor Olaf Scholz, Vice-Chancellor Robert Habeck, and Foreign Minister Annalena Baerbock.

In April 2025, it was announced that the German government was attempting to deport four foreign residents for alleged participation in pro-Palestine protests.

== Economic relations ==
Bilateral trade exchange plays a rather minor role, with a volume of 103 million euros (2021). Germany, however, is an important partner in development aid, with aid of nearly 60 million euros per year, with Germany paying particular attention to the creation of projects to promote employment. In addition, Germany provides aid for the reconstruction of the Gaza Strip and works closely with Palestinian authorities on water, sanitation, and waste management. Germany is a partner of the UN Relief and Works Agency for Palestinian Refugees. In 2021, Germany donated 150 million euros to support Palestinian refugees.

== Cultural relations ==
There are numerous contacts in the field of culture. The Goethe-Institut operates a joint Franco-German Cultural Center in Ramallah with the Institut Français. The Deutsche Akademische Austauschdienst promotes student exchange, and in the academic field there is close cooperation between universities from both countries. Numerous private sponsors carry out cultural work in Palestine, and with the Schmidt School in East Jerusalem and the Talitha Kumi School in Beit Jala there are two German schools in Palestine. Germany is also involved in archaeological and historical research in the region, which has a long tradition.

The Palestinian Community in Germany (Palästinensische Gemeinde in Deutschland) and the German-Palestinian Society (Deutsch-palästinensische Gesellschaft) are two organizations promoting bilateral cultural relations and also serve as Palestinian advocacy groups in Germany. The former has appeared in reports by the Verfassungsschutz and is considered close to Hamas.

== Migration ==
There is a large Palestinian-born community among Arabs in Germany. Their number is estimated to be close to 100,000, many of them living in the Neukölln district in the German capital Berlin. The first Palestinians arrived in Germany in the 1960s, and with the start of the Lebanese Civil War beginning in 1975, there was a wave of immigration. Well-known German-Palestinians include politician Sawsan Chebli and rapper Massiv.
