= Ministry of Post and Telecommunications (East Germany) =

- Ministerium für Post- und Fernmeldewesen der DDR

Agency overview
- Preceding agency: Central Administration for Posts and Telecommunications
- Superseding agency: Federal Ministry of Post and Telecommunications
- Jurisdiction: East Germany
- Headquarters: East Berlin
- Child agency: Deutsche Post of the GDR

Ministry of Post and Telecommunications of the German Democratic Republic (German: Ministerium für Post- und Fernmeldewesen der DDR) was a ministry in the Council of Ministers of East Germany responsible for telecommunications and post topics.

== History ==
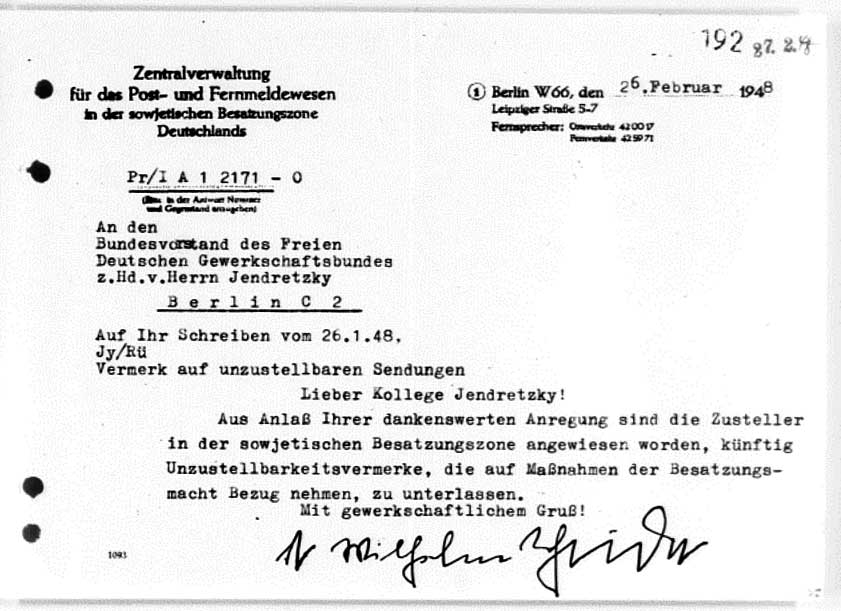
Letter from the Central Postal Administration to the trade union, 1948

The ministry had a predecessor immediately after the World War II: the Central Administration for Posts and Telecommunications in the Soviet occupation zone in Germany, founded by the Soviet Military Administration in Germany (SMAD) with "Order No. 17", and renamed the German Economic Commission (DWK), Main Administration for Posts and Telecommunications (HVPF) from 1948 onward. Its president was Wilhelm Schröder (KPD, later SED).

The Central Administration attempted to establish a regular postal service during the politically charged occupation period. Even minor delivery problems were influenced by major politics. On January 26, 1948, trade union official Hans Jendretzky complained to his colleague Schröder in the Central Administration that a letter to the state executive committee of the Free German Trade Union Federation in Potsdam, mistakenly addressed to Schopenhauerstrasse 22 instead of 27, had been returned to the sender with the note: "Occupied by Russians". In the letter, Jendretzky urged that mail carriers be required to avoid such actions because of the "effect of such notices on residents of the western zones."

With the formal establishment of the German Democratic Republic in October 1949, the Soviet-controlled main administrations were transformed into ministries, including the GDR Ministry of Posts and Telecommunications. The first minister was the trade unionist and postal expert Friedrich Burmeister, and the last was Emil Schnell. The first exploratory talks, which led to the dissolution of the ministry, took place in December 1989 between East German post and telecommunications minister Klaus Wolf and the West German postal minister Christian Schwarz-Schilling. Following the German reunification in 1990, the ministry was abolished and absorbed into the Federal Ministry of Post and Telecommunications.

== Ministers ==
- Friedrich Burmeister (CDU) (1949–1963)
- Rudolph Schulze (CDU) (1963–1989)
- Klaus Wolf (CDU) (November 1989–April 1990, during the Modrow government)
- Emil Schnell (SPD) (April 1990-August 1990)
