= Norbert Müller =

German politician

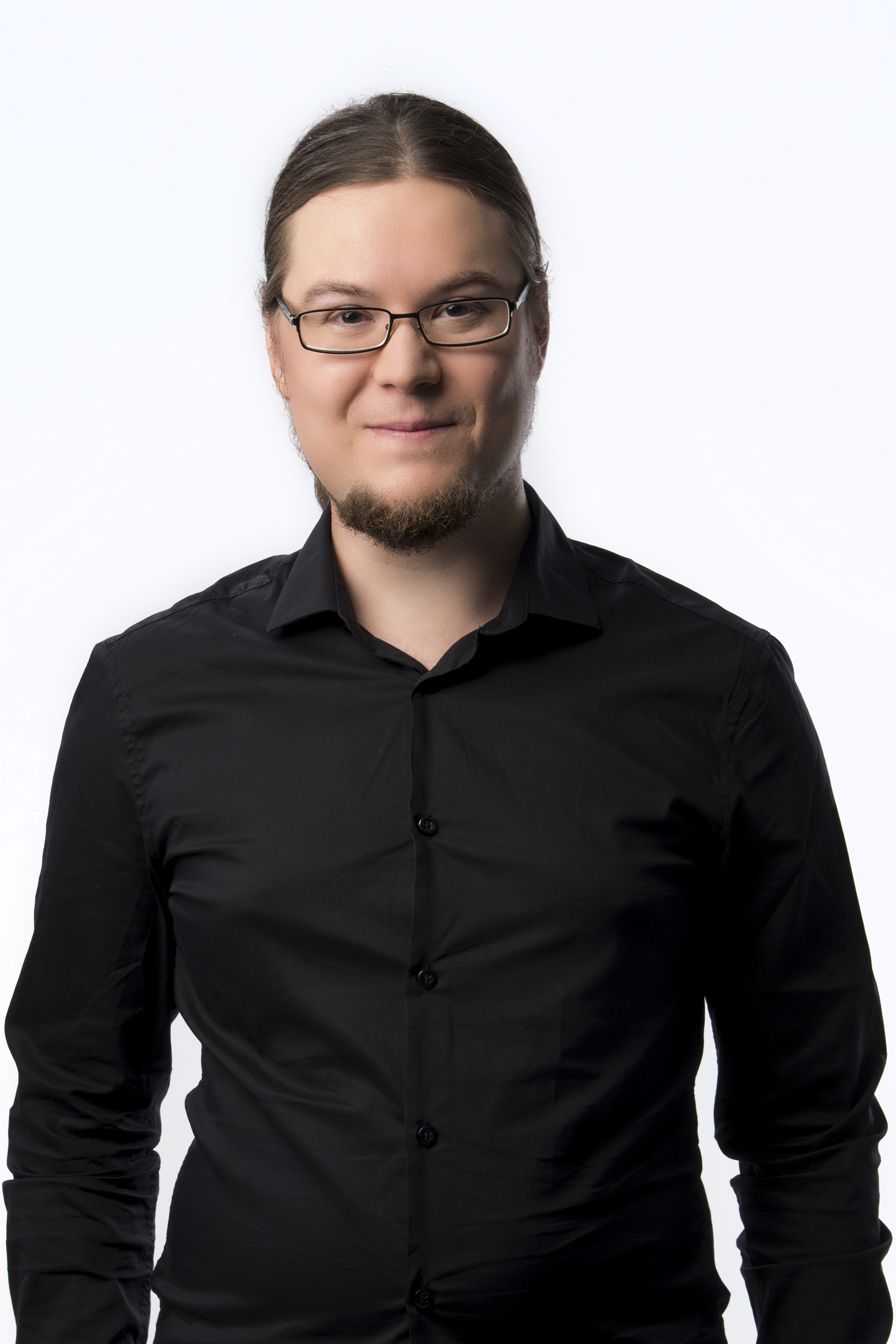
- Müller in 2015

Member of the Bundestag for Brandenburg
- In office 7 November 2014 – 26 October 2021
- Preceded by: Diana Golze
- Succeeded by: multi-member district
- Constituency: The Left list

Member of the Landtag of Brandenburg
- In office 25 October 2013 – 8 October 2014
- Preceded by: Birgit Wöllert
- Succeeded by: multi-member district
- Constituency: The Left list

Personal details
- Born: 10 February 1986 (age 40) Wriezen, Bezirk Frankfurt, East Germany (now Germany)
- Party: The Left
- Children: 3
- Education: University of Potsdam (no degree)
- Occupation: Politician; Teacher
- Website: Official website

Norbert Müller (born 10 February 1986) is a German politician. Born in Wriezen, Bezirk Frankfurt, he represents The Left. Norbert Müller has served as a member of the Bundestag from the state of Brandenburg since 2014.

== Life ==
Müller grew up in Strausberg. Since graduating from high school in 2005, Norbert Müller has been studying history as well as lifestyle, ethics and religion at the University of Potsdam. From 2010 to 2013 he was an assistant to Sabine Wils, MEP. He became member of the bundestag in 2014. He is a member of the Committee for Family, Senior Citizens, Women and Youth.
