= Nuthetal =

- Municipality
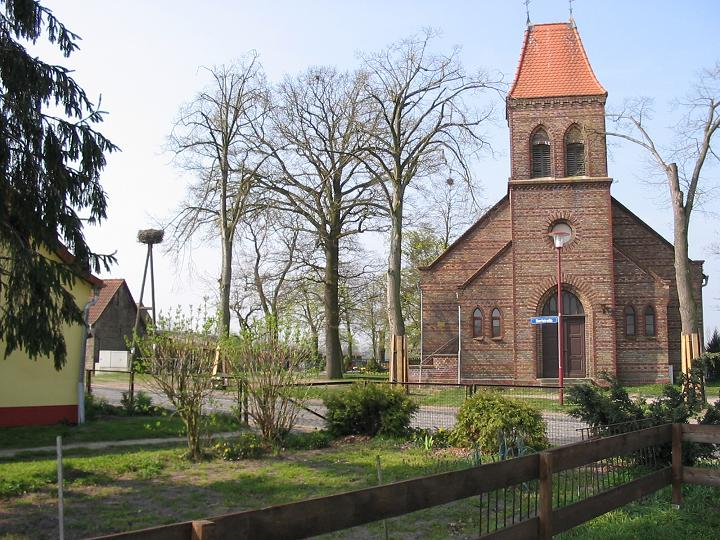
- Church in the village of Fahlhorst and nest of stork

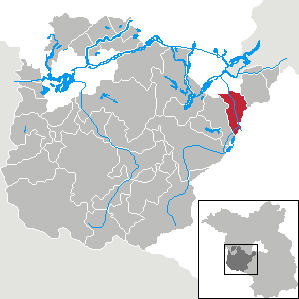
- Location of Nuthetal within Potsdam-Mittelmark district
- Interactive map of Nuthetal
- Location within Germany Location within Brandenburg
- Coordinates: 52°21′00″N 13°05′59″E
- Country: Germany
- State: Brandenburg
- District: Potsdam-Mittelmark
- Subdivisions: 6 parts

Government
  - Mayor (2018–26): Ute Hustig

Area
  - Total: 47.56 km^{2} (18.36 sq mi)
- Elevation: 34 m (112 ft)

Population (2025-12-31)
  - Total: 9,302
  - Density: 195.6/km^{2} (506.6/sq mi)
- Time zone: UTC+01:00 (CET)
  - Summer (DST): UTC+02:00 (CEST)
- Postal codes: 14558
- Dialling codes: 033200
- Vehicle registration: PM
- Website: www.nuthetal.de

Nuthetal is a municipality in the Potsdam-Mittelmark district, in Brandenburg, Germany.

== Geography ==
Nuthetal is situated south-west of Berlin. The area was formed from a series of large moraines during the last ice age. The municipality originated in October 2003 from the voluntary union of the independent municipalities Bergholz-Rehbrücke, Fahlhorst, Nudow, Philippsthal, Saarmund and Tremsdorf. The municipality owes its name to the rivulet Nuthe which flows between the places situated to the west Bergholz-Rehbrücke, Saarmund and Tremsdorf and the villages Nudow and Philippsthal situated to the east and flows into Havel in Potsdam.

== Parts of the municipality ==
- Bergholz-Rehbrücke (5.600 Inhabitants)
- Fahlhorst (120 I.)
- Nudow (450 I.)
- Philippsthal (190 I.)
- Saarmund (1.450 I.)
- Tremsdorf (200 I.)

== Demography ==
Development of population since 1875 within the current Boundaries (Blue Line: Population; Dotted Line: Comparison to Population development in Brandenburg state; Grey Background: Time of Nazi Germany; Red Background: Time of communist East Germany)

Recent Population Development and Projections (Population Development before Census 2011 (blue line); Recent Population Development according to the Census in Germany in 2011 (blue bordered line); Official projections for 2005-2030 (yellow line); for 2017-2030 (scarlet line); for 2020-2030 (green line)

Nuthetal: Population development
within the current boundaries (2020)

Year	Pop.	±% p.a.
1875	2,066	—
1890	2,203	+0.43%
1910	2,528	+0.69%
1925	3,094	+1.36%
1939	4,141	+2.10%
1950	5,221	+2.13%
1964	4,637	−0.84%

Year	Pop.	±% p.a.
1971	4,802	+0.50%
1981	4,826	+0.05%
1985	4,840	+0.07%
1990	4,713	−0.53%
1995	5,724	+3.96%
2000	8,468	+8.15%
2005	8,838	+0.86%

Year	Pop.	±% p.a.
2010	8,778	−0.14%
2015	8,930	+0.34%
2016	8,958	+0.31%
2017	9,077	+1.33%
2018	9,061	−0.18%
2019	9,072	+0.12%
2020	9,035	−0.41%

== Honorary citizen ==
The only honorary citizen buried here in Bergholz-Rehbrücke is the actress, singer and revue artiste Lotte Werkmeister.
