= Foreign relations of East Germany =

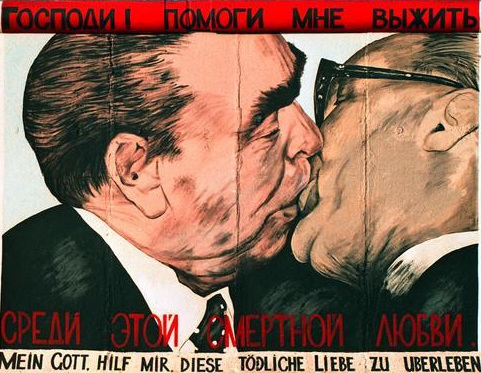
Socialist fraternal kiss between Leonid Brezhnev (USSR) and Erich Honecker (East Germany)

The foreign policy of East Germany was characterized by the close ties of East Germany (German Democratic Republic, GDR) to the Eastern Bloc. During its existence, the most important partner was the Soviet Union (USSR), which acted as a protecting power and most important trade and economic partner, which is why the GDR was often called a satellite state. The GDR remained closely linked to the other socialist states through organizations such as the Warsaw Pact and Comecon. While the GDR was relatively isolated outside the communist world in the first two decades of its existence due to the Hallstein Doctrine of West Germany (Federal Republic of Germany, FRG), a change took place in the 1970s with the rapprochement with West Germany under Chancellor Willy Brandt's new Ostpolitik. As a result, the GDR was able to gain international status and establish diplomatic relations with almost 130 countries. While the Marxist-Leninist state ideology played a major role in the foreign policy of the East German government (which was reflected in the close alignment with the socialist partner states and the support of anti-Western rebel movements in the Third World), it was however also influenced by their own economic and political interests. From the 1970s onwards, the GDR increasingly emancipated itself from the Soviet Union and pursued an independent policy towards West Germany, as loans from the West had become vital for the GDR's survival. In the 1980s, Erich Honecker refused to implement liberalizing reforms, which alienated the GDR from the USSR under Mikhail Gorbachev. After the revolutions of 1989, the Eastern Bloc collapsed and Germany was reunified, ending the period of an independent East German foreign policy.

== Orientation of East German foreign policy ==
Due to its great dependence on the Soviet Union, the GDR's sovereignty was limited. As part of the Brezhnev Doctrine, the Soviet Union reserved the right to intervene in its sphere of influence if the line it had set was deviated too much. It intervened militarily in Hungary in 1956 and Czechoslovakia in 1968 when it saw its interests threatened. This doctrine was only abandoned under Gorbachev in the 1980s.

The GDR foreign policy was based on the principles of Marxism-Leninism. The highest ideological primacy was international solidarity with other socialist states and movements. Accordingly, a political distinction was made between relations with other socialist states, those with the western capitalist states and with the non-aligned states (“Third World”). According to the state ideology, foreign policy had to serve the worldwide realization of socialism (Aufbau des Sozialismus) and the world revolution. To implement these goals, there was close cooperation with the friendly states of the “socialist world system”. Peaceful and subversive methods were used to establish a global “classless society.” Peaceful methods included financing communist parties abroad and providing technical and economic support to friendly states. The subversive methods included political and military support for armed movements and the espionage activities of the Main Directorate for Reconnaissance of the Ministry of State Security (Stasi). Since the possible outbreak of a Third World War was an existential threat for the GDR, which was located directly on the border between East and West, it tried to play a constructive role in international negotiations about disarmament and the preservation of world peace. The GDR launched disarmament initiatives for zones free of chemical and nuclear weapons in its immediate surroundings.

There was a certain tension between the basic ideological goals and the pursuit of one's own interests. In particular, relations with West Germany were perceived as a question of prestige for the GDR leadership, which is why they tried to bring their own initiatives into German-German relations. But there were also economic interests in the relationship with the Federal Republic. That is why the GDR was prepared to neglect relations with the socialist camp in the 1970s and 1980s when it signed bilateral agreements with West Germany against the will of the Soviets.

== Primary institutions and actors ==
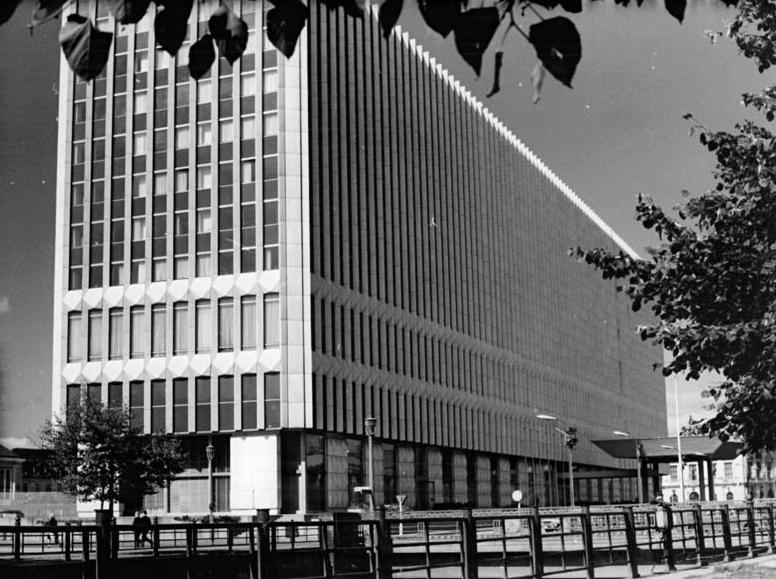
Headquarter of the East German foreign ministry (1972)

In its early days, GDR foreign policy, to the extent that it existed at all, was dominated by the Soviet Union. The Soviet Control Commission existed as a control body until 1955. With the GDR gaining sovereignty, the Soviet embassy remained in East Berlin, which monitored GDR policy through the KGB and reported back to Moscow.

The Ministry for Foreign Affairs was responsible for carrying out foreign relations. The Ministry for Internal German Trade, Foreign Trade and Material Supply and the Ministry for National Defense also played a role in the state's foreign policy. The State Council was responsible for signing international treaties until the GDR constitution of 1974 transferred most of its foreign policy powers to the Council of Ministers. As with domestic policy, decisions on all foreign policy issues were made by the Socialist Unity Party of Germany (SED), which dominated the political system as a bloc party without separation of powers. Due to the high importance of the governing parties in the socialist states, the SED's relations with other socialist governing parties also played an important role on the informal level, in addition to the "official" bilateral state relations. This has also been referred to as a “substitute foreign policy.”

Under the rule of Erich Honecker, there was also a strong concentration of foreign policy decision-making authority on his own person.

In East Germany, there were numerous “friendship societies” to maintain relations with individual states, which were merged in 1961 to form an umbrella organization, the League for Friendship of Nations. These organizations played a major role, especially before the GDR was internationally widely recognized. The GDR also carried out extensive foreign propaganda, which was entrusted to the Central Committee for Foreign Information, Propaganda and Agitation at the party level and the Foreign ministry at the state level. Through the GDR Peace Council, the GDR also exercised influence on the communist-infiltrated World Peace Council and the global peace movement. Through inter-societal organizations and its secret service, the GDR maintained contacts with the Communist Party of Germany (KPD) until the KPD was banned in 1956 in West Germany and also with the West German student movement. The GDR also tried to infiltrate West German government; the exposure of the East German spy Günter Guillaume in the Guillaume affair led to the fall of the Brandt government in 1974.

== History ==
=== Soviet Occupation zone and founding of East Germany (1945–1949) ===
The GDR emerged from the Soviet occupation zone in Germany as a legacy of the division of Germany after the Second World War, when the Soviet Union began to build its establish its own system on the occupied territories of Germany. Josef Stalin commissioned the German exiled communist Walter Ulbricht and his Ulbricht group to build new state structures. As a result, the Soviets also oversaw the merger of the SPD with the KPD in 1946 to form the new socialist unity party SED. After this was completed, Ulbricht carried out internal party purges against the existing remnants of social democracy on behalf of Stalin, whereby he was rewarded by the Soviets with the role of leading politician in the German Democratic Republic, which was proclaimed in 1949 after an East-West agreement over the future of Germany had failed to materialize and the Cold War had begun.

=== Early years (1949–1961) ===
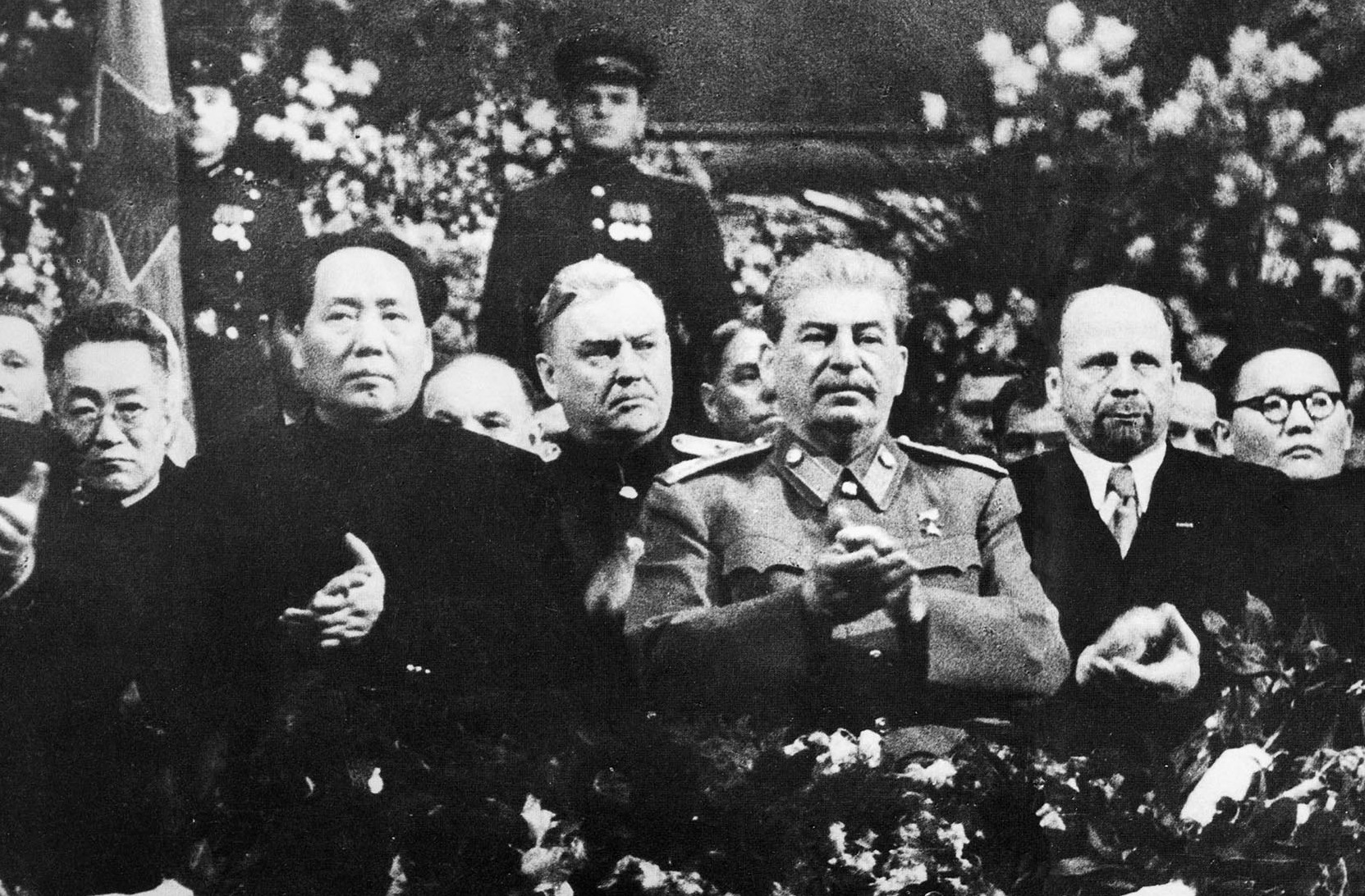
Mao, Bulganin, Stalin, Ulbricht and Tsedenbal 1949

After its founding, the GDR remained closely linked to the Soviet Union by joining the Council for Mutual Economic Assistance (Comecon) and initially functioned as a bargaining chip for the possible neutrality of a united Germany. In 1952, West German Chancellor Konrad Adenauer and the Western powers rejected the offers of German reunification made in the Stalin Note because the West distrusted Stalin. As a result, the GDR strengthened its socialist character and the East German uprising of June 1953 was suppressed by Soviet forces. On 25 March 1954, the Soviet government declared the recognition of the sovereignty of the GDR, which from now on was to decide “at its own discretion about its internal and external affairs”, but remained closely tied to the Eastern Bloc via the Warsaw Pact founded in 1955. In the same year, West Germany adopted the Hallstein Doctrine, which classified diplomatic relations of third countries with the GDR as an “unfriendly act” and sanctioned it with breaking off all diplomatic contacts. West Germany wanted to avoid international recognition of two German states with this policy. As a result, the GDR's diplomatic contacts remained limited to the socialist states and some third world countries, as most countries gave priority to relations with West Germany. Successes for the GDR were the establishment of diplomatic relations with Yugoslavia (1957), which led to West Germany breaking off relations with Yugoslavia in response, and increased economic cooperation with third world states. The GDR's subordinate role vis-à-vis the Soviets during the Berlin Crisis (1958) and in the closure of the inner-German border ordered by Nikita Khrushchev (1961) demonstrated the Soviet Union's continued dominance over GDR foreign relations at this time.

=== Professionalization of foreign policy and efforts for international recognition (1962–1968) ===
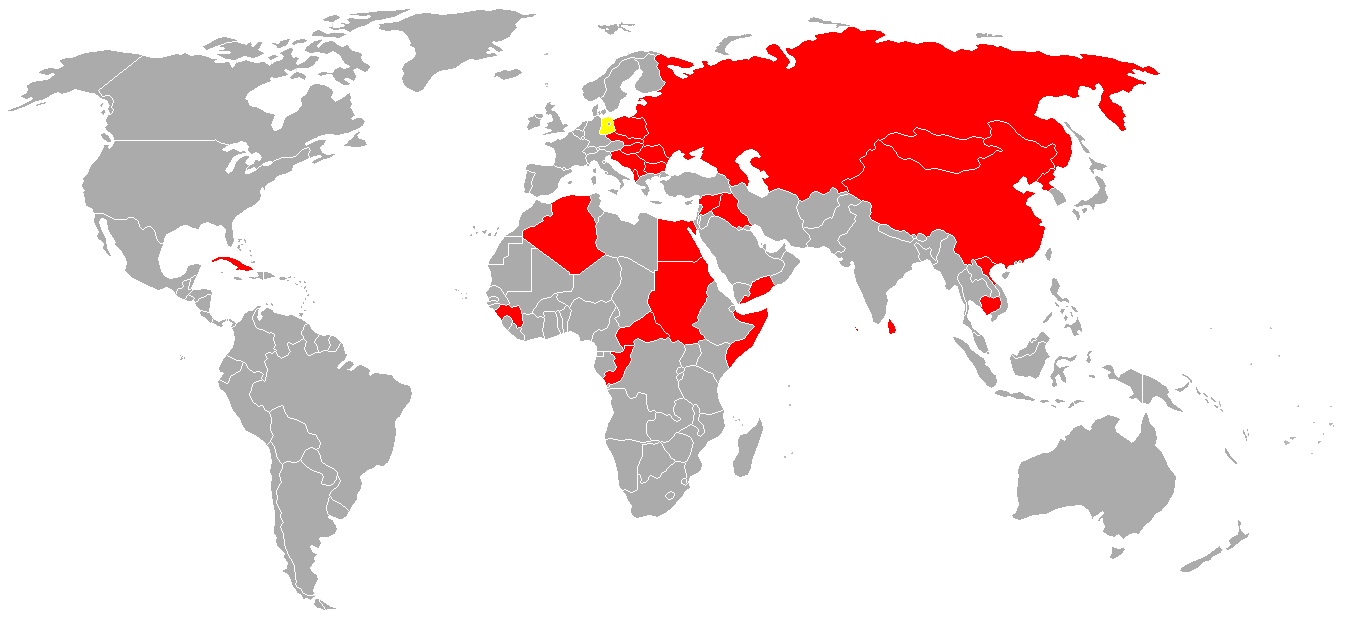
Recognition of the GDR in 1970

In the 1960s, the GDR's foreign policy apparatus began to expand and foreign policy became more professional, as foreign policy became more important for the young state from the second half of the 1950s onwards. More commercial representations were set up abroad instead of official foreign embassies, the establishment of which was hindered by the Hallstein Doctrine. The GDR's allegiance to the Soviets was reaffirmed in 1964 with the conclusion of a treaty of friendship, cooperation and mutual assistance. The GDR tried to promote its international recognition through friendship societies, which acted as a lobby for diplomatic recognition of the GDR in numerous countries. In 1967, the establishment of diplomatic relations with the West Germany by the People's Republic of Romania led to disputes between the East German and Romanian party leadership. In response, the Warsaw Pact states adopted the Ulbricht Doctrine, which only allowed the Warsaw Pact states to normalize relations with West Germany if the latter in turn recognized “the existing borders and the existence of two German states”.

The attempts in the Prague Spring of 1968 to establish reform communism or “socialism with a human face” were dogmatically condemned by the GDR leadership and perceived as a threat. The GDR indirectly supported the military suppression of the Czechoslovak reform movement by securing supplies for the Warsaw Pact intervention troops. The GDR supported the Brezhnev Doctrine announced after Leonid Brezhnev's intervention.

=== Détente with the West and international recognition (1969–1974) ===
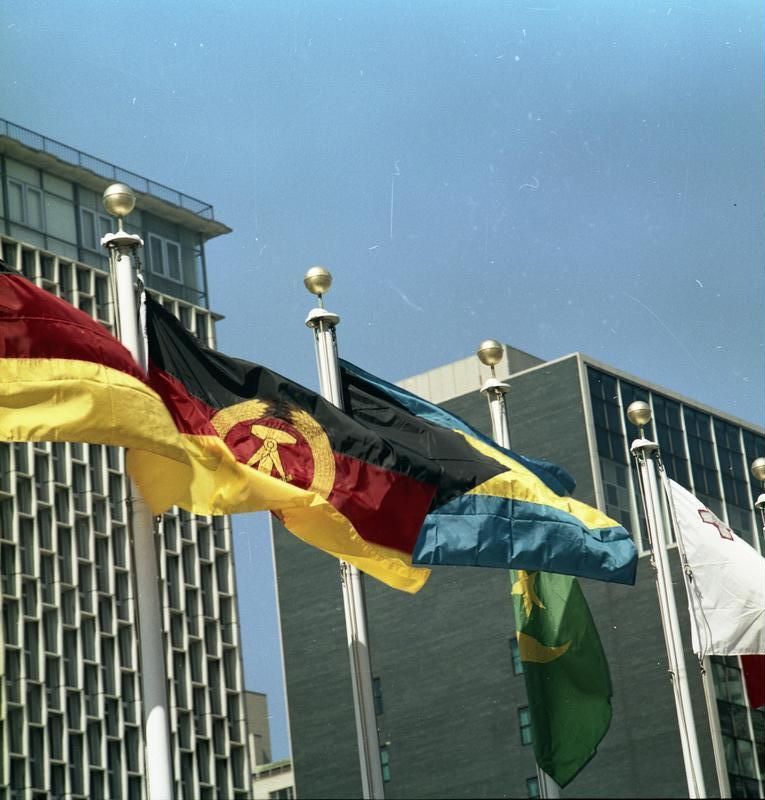
The flags of both German states in front of the UN headquarters in New York in 1973

West German Chancellor Willy Brandt, who was elected into office in 1969, announced a new Eastern policy for West Germany, which was intended to improve relations with the GDR and the other Warsaw Pact states. A diplomatic breakthrough came with the conclusion of the Treaty of Moscow in 1970 between West Germany and the USSR, which marked the start of a series of treaties. During the negotiations that began in 1969, East Berlin found itself caught between the fronts of both powers, with Moscow rejecting any excessive rapprochement between the GDR and the FRG. The Soviets also disliked Ulbricht's attempt to take an independent position here and his ambitions to challenge the Soviets on economic policy within the socialist camp. This was also one of the reasons why Brezhnev supported the dismissal of Ulbricht and his replacement by Erich Honecker in 1971. Brezhnev warned the new head of state Honecker with the words “without us there is no GDR.” After the four-power agreement on Berlin on 3 September 1971 on the legal status of the city of Berlin and an inter-German transit agreement of 17 December 1971, the basic treaty between East and West Germany came into force on 21 June 1973. With the treaty, West Germany recognized East Germany de facto as an independent German state. The Hallstein doctrine had already been abandoned before then. The treaty represented a breakthrough for the GDR's international position and, in addition to third world states, Western countries also established relations with the GDR. In 1973 alone, diplomatic relations were established with 46 countries, which enabled the GDR to send numerous new ambassadors and conclude more international treaties. On 18 September 1973, the East and West finally joined the United Nations (UN) together. As part of the policy of détente between East and West, the GDR and the FRG also cooperated together in the Conference on Security and Co-operation in Europe from 1973 onwards. A year later in 1974, the western superpower, the United States, also established diplomatic relations with the GDR.

=== Rising independence from the Soviet Union (1975–1984) ===
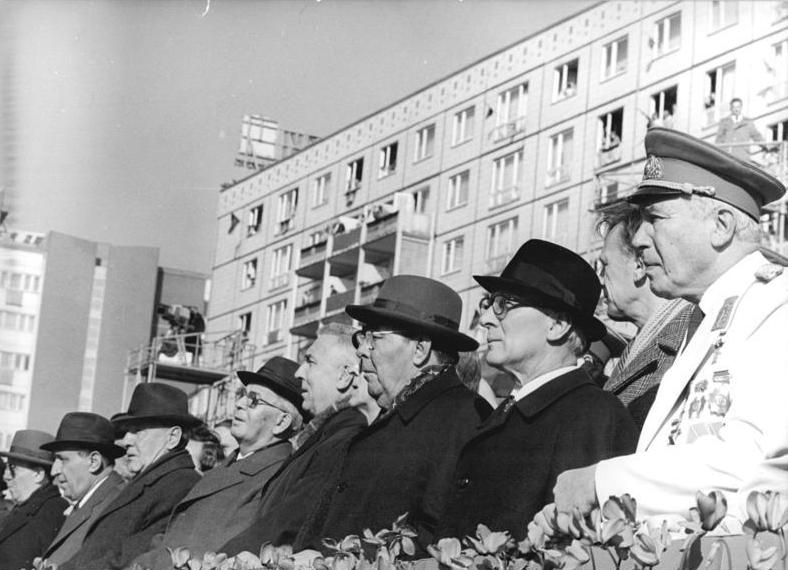
Leonid Brezhnev with Erich Honecker on the 30th anniversary of the founding of the GDR (1979)

The GDR used the new international recognition in the second half of the 1970s to deepen economic and political contacts with numerous developing countries in Africa, Asia and the Americas. The GDR courted numerous non-aligned states and provided technical and economic assistance. The GDR trained security and police forces in countries such as Angola and Mozambique. From 1977 onwards, “anti-imperialist solidarity” was coordinated by a separate commission of the SED Politburo. The increased international cooperation ensured an increasing number of foreigners in the GDR, as more and more foreign workers were trained or worked here or studied as students at GDR universities.

Relations with the states of the Eastern Bloc remained intensive. Agreements with Hungary, Poland, Bulgaria and Czechoslovakia on “friendship, cooperation and mutual assistance” were renewed in 1977. Two years earlier, the GDR and the USSR had sworn to “eternal friendship” with an “irrevocable alliance” in a bilateral treaty. Honecker followed the Soviet model closely and was a loyal ally. Nevertheless, the Soviets' influence on the GDR declined with time. The GDR's deepened relations with West Germany were driven by economic necessity, as the GDR's ailing command economy was increasingly dependent on loans from the West. With the intensified confrontation with the West after the Soviet invasion of Afghanistan at the end of the 1970s, the Soviets wanted to force an end to the GDR's rapprochement with West Germany. However, the GDR refused and, despite the displeasure of the Soviets, signed a new German-German transport agreement in 1978. In 1981, the Soviets reduced their oil deliveries, whereupon West Germany offered aid payments in return for an agreement on easier travel for GDR citizens. Due to the poor economic situation, the GDR was forced to accept the offer, which Moscow once again didn't like. Under the aging Brezhnev, Honecker increasingly tried to take on a leading role among the socialist heads of state.

=== Final phase of the GDR (1985–1990) ===
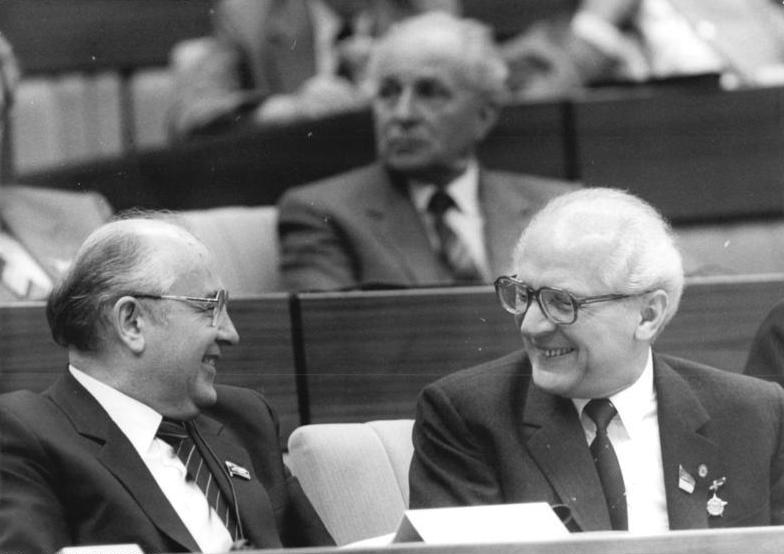
Mikhail Gorbachev with Erich Honecker in 1986

In the 1980s, the crisis of communist economies became increasingly apparent. In 1985, Mikhail Gorbachev came to power in Moscow and adopted an ambitious reform program (Glasnost and Perestroika). The dynamic reformer's rise to power was initially welcomed in East Berlin, even though Gorbachev and Honecker had had a strained relationship since 1984. A year after coming to power, Gorbachev abolished the Brezhnev Doctrine and gave the socialist states the freedom to chart their own course (Sinatra Doctrine), which initiated the collapse of the Warsaw Pact. Honecker saw the danger and increasingly distanced himself from the Soviet reform projects, while Gorbachev, in return, criticized the GDR leadership's unwillingness to reform. In contrast to the Soviets, Honecker announced his own form of socialism for the GDR at the end of 1988, distancing himself. However, the GDR had no concept to combat the beginning dissolution of the Soviet bloc. The opening of Hungary's border with Austria in May 1989 led to a mass exodus of GDR citizens and initiated the downfall of the GDR. After the first free Volkskammer elections in 1990, the new CDU-led government distanced itself from the foreign policy legacy of the SED era. With the Two Plus Four Treaty of 12 September 1990, both German states laid the foundation for German reunification in negotiations, which led to East Germany joining the Federal Republic of Germany on 3 October 1990.

== Significant bilateral relations ==
=== West Germany ===
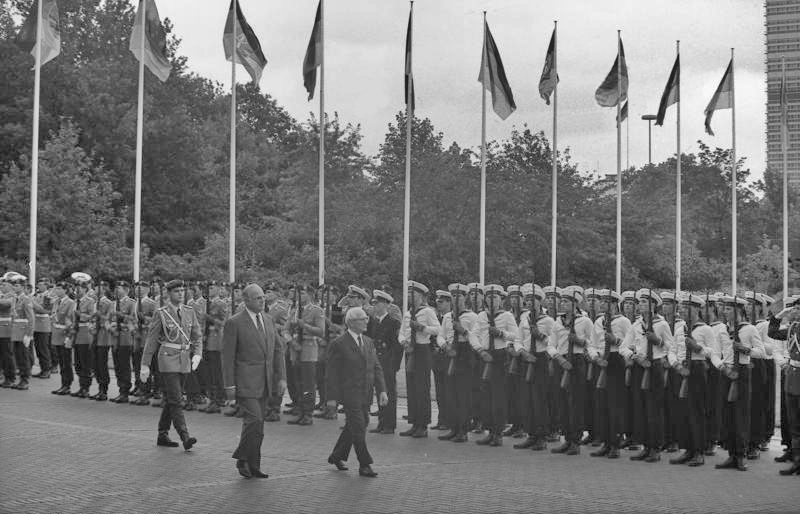
Helmut Kohl with Erich Honecker (1987)

The German-German relationship was of great importance for both sides. After the founding of two German states, West Germany claimed exclusive representation for the divided Germany, while East Germany pursued the goal of being internationally recognized as the second German state. With the Hallstein Doctrine, West Germany tried to isolate the East internationally and until 1966 all government contacts with East Berlin were categorically rejected, even if trade contacts existed. Contact was finally made for the first time under Kurt Georg Kiesinger in 1967, after the construction of the Berlin Wall in the early 1960s had created facts. Under Chancellor Willy Brandt, the old German policy positions were abandoned and the basic treaty of 1972 laid the basis for cooperation between the two states. As a result, numerous agreements concerning trade, transport, freedom of travel, culture and other areas were concluded between the two states. Even the Soviets' distrust of the inner-German rapprochement after the intensified bloc confrontation from 1979 and the assumption of office of the conservative Chancellor Helmut Kohl in 1982 could no longer stop the rapprochement. During the Soviet-American tensions of the early 1980s, the two German states tried to mediate between the blocs in order to defuse the situation. The GDR received loans from the Federal Republic and trade with the West became vital for its survival, which led to the GDR becoming increasingly economically dependent, which West Germany used to achieve political goals, e.g. making travel easier for GDR citizens. In 1987, Erich Honecker made a historic visit to West Germany, the first and only state visit by a head of state from the East to West Germany. The GDR saw this as the long-sought recognition of the GDR as an independent German state by the FRG. Soon afterwards, however, the Berlin Wall came down and, after the SED was ousted from power, Germany was reunified.

=== Relations with friendly states of the socialist world ===
==== Soviet Union ====
Logo of the Society for German-Soviet Friendship (DSF)

As the most important state in the Eastern Bloc, relations with the Soviet Union were of paramount importance. The GDR emerged under the influence of the Soviet Union and remained tied to it throughout its existence. The influence of the USSR as a role model and socialist brother state was not only limited to politics and economics, but also to culture. Erich Honecker summed this up when he announced in 1974 that “there is practically no crucial area of everyday life in which friendship with the Soviet Union is not reflected.” Russian was taught as the first foreign language in school and the Society for German-Soviet Friendship was the second largest mass organization in the GDR with six million members. Soviet-Russian culture, music, cuisine and media products were widespread in the GDR. As part of the “socialist brotherhood of arms,” between 300,000 and 500,000 soldiers from the Soviet Union were permanently stationed in the GDR, more than in any other country outside the USSR. The Soviets were also the most important trade and economic partner, with which almost 38 percent of the GDR's foreign trade was transacted in 1981. The Soviets supplied petroleum and other raw materials to the GDR, while uranium from the GDR was very important for the Soviet nuclear industry.

Despite the ongoing official assurances of mutual friendship, there was also an underlying mistrust on both sides, which was based on the difficult shared legacy of the Second World War and the GDR's great dependence. The Soviets repeatedly intervened in the GDR's internal affairs. As the “ruling” ambassador, the Soviet ambassador Pyotr Abrasimov (1962–1971 and 1975–1983 ambassador to the GDR) liked to give direct instructions to GDR politicians. He later described the GDR as the Soviets' "homunculus," and said "without us it would not have survived a year." With an independent foreign policy towards the Federal Republic of Germany, the GDR finally began to emancipate itself more strongly from the Soviets in the 1970s. Glasnost and perestroika were rejected by the GDR in the 1980s. In the final phase of the GDR, the government even had Soviet media such as Sputnik censored because they began to report critically as part of Gorbachev's reforms.

==== Poland ====
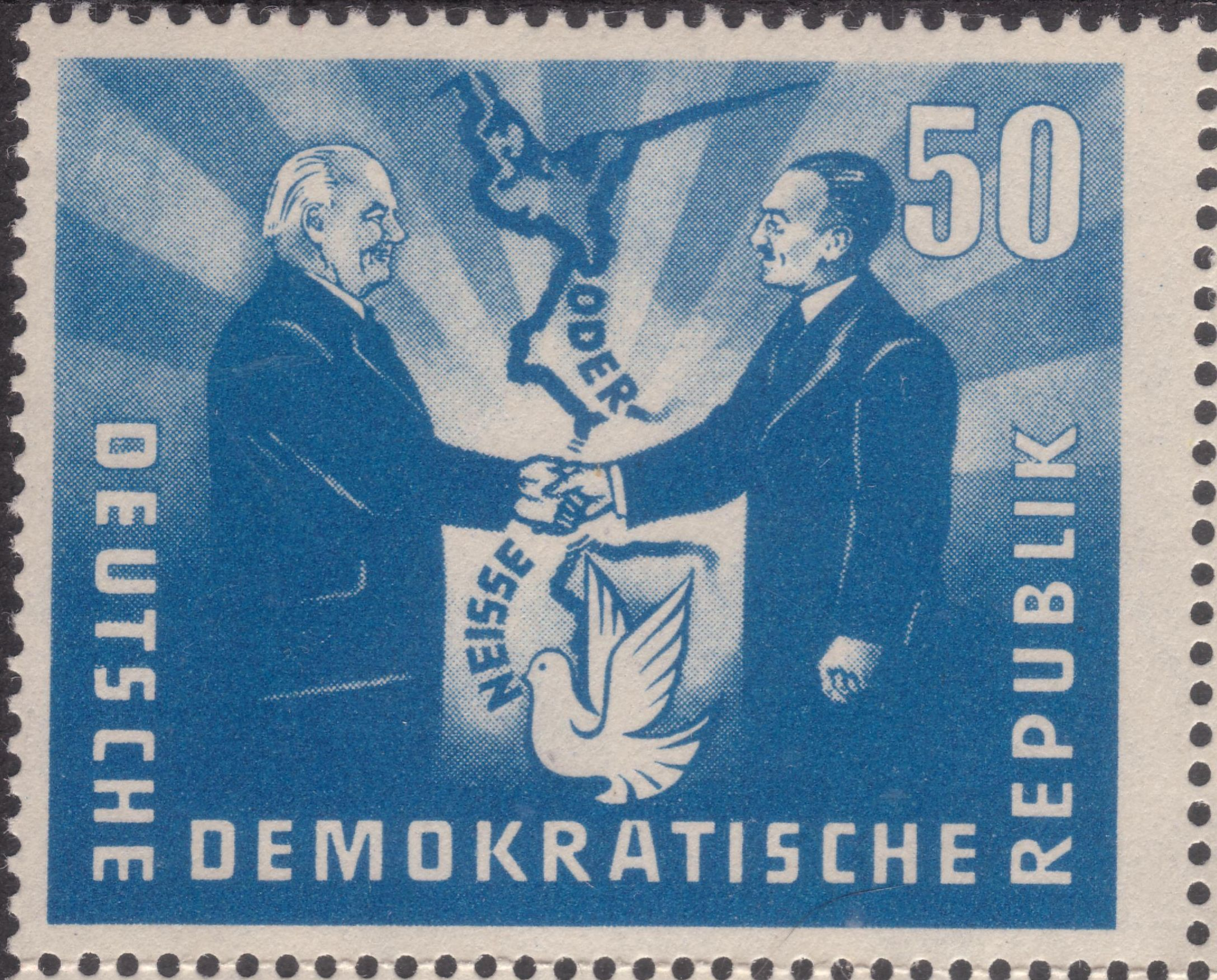
GDR post stamp celebrating the Treaty of Zgorzelec

Towards the end of the Second World War, Stalin pushed through Poland's westward shift and in 1945 handed over large parts of the German eastern territories to the People's Republic of Poland, which, like the GDR, was also a Soviet satellite state. The GDR and the People's Republic of Poland established diplomatic relations in 1949 and Poland demanded that the GDR recognize the Oder-Neisse line as the border between the two states. Under pressure from the Soviets, the GDR had to give in and in July 1950 the Treaty of Zgorzelec was signed, in which the GDR recognized the border, which West Germany in turn rejected. In 1954, Poland waived reparations to the GDR for damage from the Second World War, also under pressure from the Soviets. The relationship between the two states can be characterized as a "forced friendship". Economically, however, the relations were close due to deliveries of coal and food from Poland to the GDR. For a long time, contacts between the two societies remained primarily state-based, personal contacts were restricted and the border between the two states was only opened in 1972. The East German leadership watched the emergence of the anti-communist Solidarity movement with concern and in 1980 the GDR stopped free travel with Poland as a “cordon sanitaire” against the “Polish fever”. Honecker also repeatedly spoke out in favor of an invasion of Poland by the Warsaw Pact in order to crush the “counter-revolution” militarily. After martial law was declared in Poland in 1981, Honecker offered support from the National People's Army.

==== Czechoslovakia ====
The Czechoslovak Socialist Republic diplomatically recognized the GDR in 1949 and both states subsequently concluded several agreements on economic, cultural and military cooperation. In the Treaty of Prague of July 1950, both states renounced mutual territorial claims, declared the Munich Agreement of 1938 invalid and the resettlement or expulsion of the German population of the Sudetenland as “final” and “just”. Both states were subsequently able to establish cooperative relationships and in 1964 the visa requirement between the two states was lifted, meaning Czechoslovakia could become a popular travel destination for East German tourists. However, the GDR was suspicious of Prague reform communism and Walter Ulbricht supported the Warsaw Pact invasion of Czechoslovakia in 1968, although the GDR did not participate directly. After the installation of a loyal regime in Prague, both states jointly rejected Mikhail Gorbachev's reforms in the 1980s until the Velvet Revolution occurred in 1989.

==== Hungary ====
The Hungarian People's Republic and the GDR established diplomatic relations in 1949. Both supported each other in industrialization, collectivization of agriculture and ideological education of the population in the spirit of "building socialism". The GDR supported the Soviets' suppression of the Hungarian uprising in 1956 diplomatically, as the SED cadres feared for their own power in the event of a successful revolution. It was possible for East German citizens to travel to Hungary, which is why the Stasi established cooperation with the Hungarian security authorities in order to prevent flights to the West and to monitor overly close East-West contacts. From the 1970s onwards, Hungary pursued a so-called goulash communism, which allowed more economic and social freedoms than the orthodox line of the GDR. The GDR saw Hungary as a potential deviant from the socialist camp and put pressure on the Hungarian leadership to adhere to Soviet guidelines. The break came when Hungary opened the border with Austria in 1989, allowing many GDR citizens to escape to the West, which the East German leadership decried as "betrayal of socialism".

==== Yugoslavia ====
Under Josip Tito, Yugoslavia was a member of the Non-Aligned Movement and maintained good diplomatic contacts with the West, although it was nominally socialist. This independent line of Yugoslavia complicated relations with the GDR. In 1948, Tito criticized the “democratic centralism” of the GDR and in 1951 the SED came to the conclusion that “the Tito regime had become a fascist agency and a loyal tool of the dollar empire.” With de-Stalinization, relations improved and in 1957 both countries finally established diplomatic relations. After the GDR agreed to pay compensation for forced laborers during the Second World War in 1963, Tito made a state visit to the GDR in 1965, where he was awarded the Star of People's Friendship by Walter Ulbricht. After Yugoslavia criticized the suppression of the Prague Spring in 1968, relations soured again. Under Erich Honecker, both states maintained cooperative relations from 1971 and emphasized their “friendship” in 1977. However, due to its independent line, Yugoslavia remained largely taboo as a holiday destination for East German citizens until the fall of the Berlin Wall.

==== Romania ====
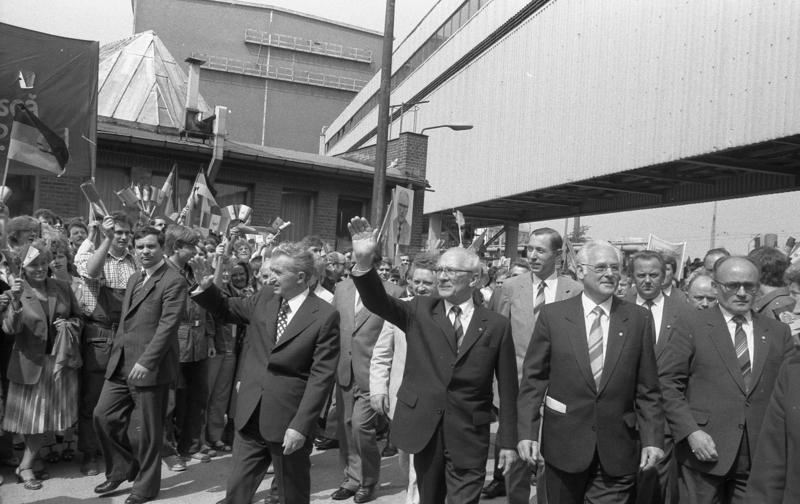
Nicolae Ceaușescu in East Berlin (1985)

The GDR and Socialist Republic of Romania were allies within the Warsaw Pact. The Stasi and the Securitate worked closely together to monitor opponents of the regime. Both services were responsible for the kidnapping of the Romanian dissident Theodor Bucur in 1953, who was arrested in East Berlin and taken to Romania. However, when Romanian President Gheorghe Gheorghiu-Dej took a course independent of the Soviet Union in the 1960s (national communism), relations became more distant as the GDR continued to align itself closely with the USSR. As a result, the close cooperation between the secret services was stopped. The GDR disliked the fact that Romania continued to pursue its independent policy under Nicolae Ceaușescu. The two states finally came closer together in the 1980s, when both opposed the reform policies of the USSR and censored critical media from the Soviet Union. As a result of this rapprochement, Honecker awarded Ceaușescu the Order of Karl Marx in November 1988.

==== China ====
The People's Republic of China was proclaimed by Mao Zedong in 1949, the same year that East Germany was founded. Due to their shared socialist orientation, both states established diplomatic relations in the first year of their existence. Both states subsequently established trade relations. Until 1971, the GDR remained the only German state with diplomatic relations with the People's Republic. However, the Chinese rift with the Soviet Union in the 1960s also strained relations with the GDR, which, like most socialist states, sided with the Soviets. Erich Honecker saw the danger of a split in the socialist camp and tried to mediate between the Soviet Union and the People's Republic during a state visit in 1986, but the latter had long since turned towards the West as part of its reform and opening policy. When the Tiananmen square massacre occurred in 1989, the GDR approved the violence against the demonstrators in Beijing. The Volkskammer passed a resolution in which the GDR announced its support for the suppression of the “counter-revolutionary unrest”. The first freely elected Volkskammer reversed this in 1990 and condemned the violence.

==== North Korea ====
The GDR and North Korea maintained excellent relations. Diplomatic contacts were established as early as 1949 and an ambassador was sent to Pyongyang in 1954. Both East Germany and North Korea intensified trade relations and technical cooperation in the 1950s. In the 1960s, the future North Korean dictator Kim Jong-il received training in the GDR, according to some reports. Erich Honecker visited North Korea in 1977 and 1986 and expressed his “complete agreement on all issues discussed” with the totalitarian North Korean leader Kim Il Sung, with whom he developed a good personal relationship. As late as 1989, both countries supported the suppression of the democracy movement in China and North Korea later offered asylum to “old friend” Honecker.

When it comes to relations with German states, North Korea is the only country that maintained diplomatic relations solely with the GDR throughout the entirety of the GDR's existence, only establishing relations with the FRG in 2001, over eleven years after the GDR's collapse.

==== Vietnam ====
The GDR established diplomatic contacts with socialist North Vietnam and supported them with humanitarian and financial aid during the Vietnam War, meanwhile West Germany supported South Vietnam. Numerous East German citizens provided help under the slogan “Solidarity with Vietnam” against the “imperialist aggressor” (the USA). In 1968, 50,000 trade unionists donated blood during a relief campaign. The Stasi also provided support in establishing the North Vietnamese secret service. After the reunification of Vietnam, close relations continued. Due to an acute labor shortage, the GDR and Vietnam signed a contract for the deployment of contract workers in April 1980. In return for development aid totaling one billion East German marks, Vietnam subsequently sent 200,000 guest workers to the GDR. The GDR was also able to import scarce goods such as coffee, tea, rubber and pepper from Vietnam. In the year of change in 1989, the 60,000 Vietnamese in the country were the largest group of foreigners in the GDR.

==== Cuba ====
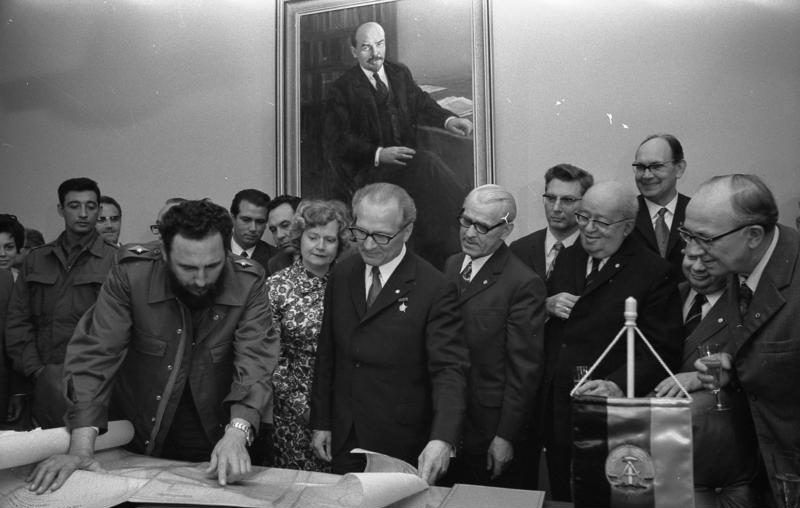
Fidel Castro with Erich Honecker (1972)

After Fidel Castro took power in Cuba in 1959, East Germany established close ties with Latin America's only socialist regime. Che Guevara visited Leipzig in 1962 to establish trade relations and Cuban students came to the GDR, while engineers and scientists from the GDR in Cuba began to support the development of the tropical island. Some ideological differences arose in the 1960s, before the GDR leadership praised Cuba's orientation towards the Soviet planned economy in 1968 as a “maturation process”. Castro's erratic foreign policy and his involvement in the Non-Aligned Movement also caused some frustration. The GDR developed close economic ties with Cuba and imported citrus fruits such as oranges and lemons at inflated prices and in return donated machinery and engines and also helped to set up the education system. From the 1970s onwards, 30,000 contract workers from Cuba came to the GDR. In 1972, during a state visit by Erich Honecker, a small Cuban island was renamed Ernst Thälmann island as a sign of friendship.

==== Syria ====
Although Syria was not nominally socialist, it closely followed the Eastern Bloc in its fight against Israel. Unofficial cooperation was established as early as the 1960s before official diplomatic relations were established in 1969 after Syria broke off relations with West Germany in 1965. The GDR had already provided extensive economic aid to Syria, which was ruled by the Baath Party. For example, East German advisors helped establish a centrally managed economy in Syria and Syrian security forces were trained by the Stasi and their Syrian equivalents were modelled on the GDR, which has influenced the structure of the Syrian state into the 21st century. Numerous Syrians also studied in the GDR. When the less socialist Syrian nationalist Hafez al-Assad came to power in 1970, relations with the GDR were scaled back and in 1974 relations with West Germany were resumed.

==== Mozambique ====
The GDR recognized the FRELIMO (Mozambican Liberation Front) as the legitimate representative of the Mozambican people and supported them in the armed struggle against Portuguese colonial rule since the 1960s. The socialist People's Republic of Mozambique was recognized by the GDR in 1975 and became a priority area for East German development aid in Africa. The GDR also sent thousands of experts, teachers, doctors and technicians to Mozambique to help with reconstruction. Mozambique acted as a frontline state against the apartheid regime in South Africa, with East Germany providing military training to the African National Congress (ANC). However, the civil war in Mozambique hindered the continuation of relations and East German development workers were killed in the Unango attack, after which the GDR withdrew almost 1,000 development workers. Mozambique also sent 21,000 contract workers to East Germany, some of whose wages went to the Mozambican government and were withheld from the workers.

==== Angola ====
The GDR supported the Marxist MPLA in Angola in the fight against the Portuguese colonial power and during the Angolan Civil War with weapons and ammunition. Over 1,000 officers and non-commissioned officers from the GDR armed forces were sent to Angola as trainers and friendship brigades from the SED youth organization Free German Youth were active as development workers in the country. The Angolan police were trained in the GDR. The GDR hoped to get its “coffee crisis” under control in the 1970s by importing coffee from Angola. A contract worker agreement was also concluded with the People's Republic of Angola, as a result of which almost 6,000 Angolans were sent to the GDR as guest workers from 1985 onwards.

==== Other socialist states ====
In the 1970s official cooperation was established with other socialist states, such as the Derg regime of Ethiopia, People's Republic of the Congo, People's Democratic Republic of Yemen, Somali Democratic Republic, Libya, and the People's Republic of Benin.

=== Other states ===
==== United States ====
As the Western superpower of the Cold War, the United States was viewed as an enemy of the party and state media. The GDR's official anti-Americanism condemned US foreign policy as imperialist and the Americans in turn saw the GDR as a mere puppet of the Soviet Union. The U.S. was the most important ally of West Germany. After rapprochement with West Germany in the 1970s, the GDR and the U.S. established diplomatic relations in December 1974 with Rolf Sieber became the first ambassador of the GDR to the U.S. From 30 July to 1 August 1975, President Gerald Ford met with Erich Honecker and had a brief conversation during a meeting in Helsinki, which led to the adoption of the Helsinki Accords. This was the first high-level government contact between the two countries. On 11 June 1990, Prime Minister Lothar de Maizière was the first and only head of state of the GDR to visit the United States meeting President George H. W. Bush at the White House. The United States was a supporter of German reunification and played a key role in the relevant negotiations.

==== Israel/Palestine ====
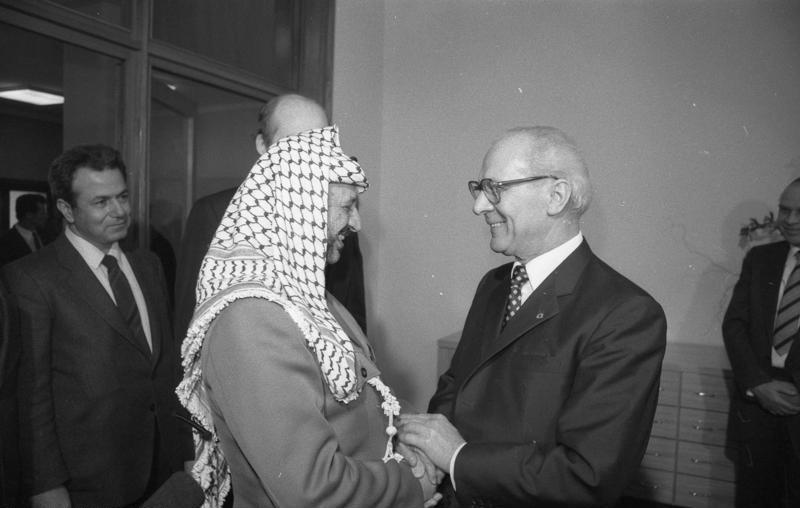
Yasser Arafat with Erich Honecker (1982)

The GDR saw itself as an anti-fascist state and refused to take responsibility for the German participation in the Holocaust. Reparation payments to Israel were therefore rejected, which is why diplomatic relations were not established. After initially taking a balanced position, the GDR and the Soviet Union ultimately clearly sided with the Arabs during the Arab–Israeli conflict. The GDR was one of the earliest supporters of the Palestinians. The GDR supported the PLO and later other armed groups financially and with weapons and also trained fighters who, in the GDR's interpretation, were anti-imperialist liberation fighters. Honecker and Palestinian leader Yasser Arafat were friends and GDR propaganda even made the accusation that Israel would plan a “final solution for the Palestinian question”. In 1975, East Germany supported UN General Assembly Resolution 3379, which condemned Zionism as "a form of racism." A change only occurred in the final phase of the GDR, when the first freely elected Volkskammer passed a declaration in June 1990 in which it "formally apologized for the anti-Israel and anti-Zionist policies that had been practiced in this country for decades."

== List of foreign ministers ==
Foreign Minister of the GDR was the head of the Ministry of Foreign Affairs of the GDR. In terms of actual political influence, the Foreign Minister was behind the respective Central Committee Secretary for International Relations, Hermann Axen from 1966 to 1989. The foreign ministers of the GDR were:

- Georg Dertinger (1949–1953)
- Anton Ackermann (1953)
- Lothar Bolz (1953–1965)
- Otto Winzer (1965–1975)
- Oskar Fischer (1975–1990)
- Markus Meckel (1990)
- Lothar de Maizière (1990)
