= Frank Terpe =

German mathematician and politician (1929–2013)

- Born: 10 October 1929; Nünchritz, Saxony, Germany
- Died: 8 April 2013 (aged 83)
- Education: Ernst Moritz Arndt University (EMAU), Greifswald
- Occupations: Mathematician; Politician
- Political party: SDP; SPD
- Children: Harald Terpe

Frank Terpe (10 October 1929 – 8 April 2013) was a German mathematician and SDP/SPD politician.

Terpe was a professor at Greifswald University. In 1990 he served as Minister for Research and Technology in East Germany's only democratically elected government.

== Life ==
=== Early years ===
Frank Terpe was born a couple of weeks before the US stock market famously collapsed, in a small country town some 25 km (15 miles) down river of Meißen in central Germany. His father was a crane operator. When Terpe was slightly more than three years old, Germany became a one party state. He attended junior school locally in Nünchritz between 1936 and 1940 and the Adolf Hitler Middle School from 1942 to 1945. He successfully completed his schooling at the upper school in Riesa, a short distance down the river and on the other side if it.

=== Academic career ===
By 1948 one one-party state had been replaced, for those living in the Soviet occupation zone of what had previously been Germany, with another. The area was being systematically converted into the German Democratic Republic (East Germany). In 1948 Terpe moved on to study Mathematics and Physics at Greifswald. He then got a position as an assistant, later promoted to senior assistant, at the town's Ernst Moritz Arndt University (EMAU). He received his doctorate in 1962 for a dissertation on the Descriptive Theory of Integration, and achieved further academic promotion (Habilitation) in 1967 for work on the Theory of Maximalen Integrals. In 1969 he was appointed Professor for Analysis. Between 1971 and 1980 Frank Terpe was in charge of the Mathematics Department at the EMAU.

Terpe remained a professor at Greifswald till his retirement in 1993.

=== Political career ===
In November 1989, a few weeks after his sixtieth birthday, Terpe joined the newly (re)formed SDP (party) (which in parallel with German reunification would merge with its western equivalent, the SPD (party), in September 1990). In February 1990 he was voted on to the party executive. In East Germany's only free election, which took place on 18 March 1990, Terpe was elected to membership of the country's National Assembly (Volkskammer), where he became the deputy Chairman of the SDP group. On 12 April 1990 he was appointed to the government being formed by Lothar de Maizière as Minister for Research and Technology in succession to Peter-Klaus Budig.

Terpe resigned from his ministerial position on 20 August 1990 following the controversial resignation from the government of its Finance Minister, Walter Romberg which led to the withdrawal of the SDP from the governing coalition.

=== Personal life and death ===
Frank Terpe's son, (Frank) Harald Terpe, is also a politician. In the 2005 election Harald Terpe was elected to the Bundestag as a member of the Green Party

Frank Terpe died on 8 April 2013, at the age of 83.
