= Sybille Reider =

German politician

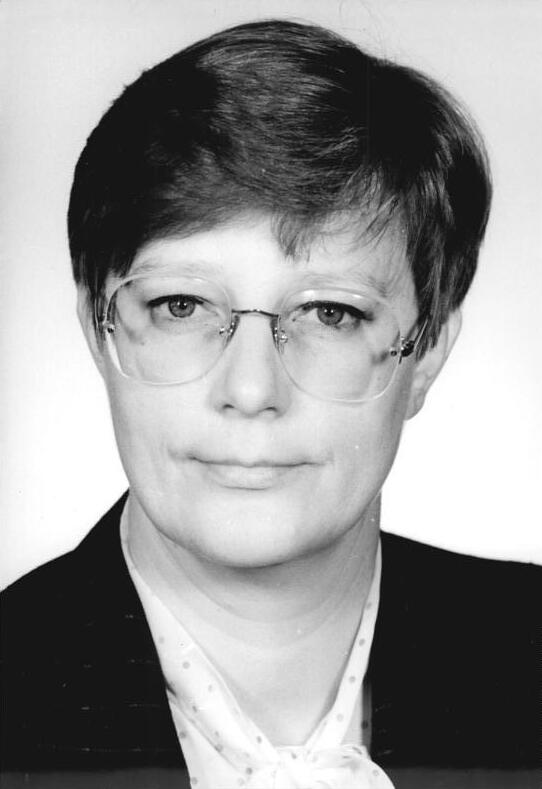
Sybille Reider in 1990

Sybille Reider (born 8 October 1949) is a German retired politician. She was a government minister in the last cabinet of East Germany. Reider was born in Wengelsdorf, Saxony-Anhalt in the newly established German Democratic Republic. She studied law at Martin Luther University of Halle-Wittenberg, completing her Diplom in 1972. She worked as legal adviser and later taught law in Leipzig.

Reider joined the Social Democratic Party in the GDR (SPD) in January 1990. She successfully ran in the 1990 East German general election. On 12 April, she was appointed to the cabinet of Lothar de Maizière as Minister for Trade and Tourism. On 20 August she resigned from office when the SPD left the government coalition, her successor was Lothar Engel (CDU). After German reunification Reider was a candidate in the 1990 German federal election, without success. Shortly afterward she left the SPD. In 2001 Reider became mayor of Wengelsdorf, an unsalaried volunteer office, and runs a construction company with her husband.
