= De Maizière cabinet =

Last government of East Germany (GDR)

Cabinet of Lothar de Maizière
- Cabinet of East Germany

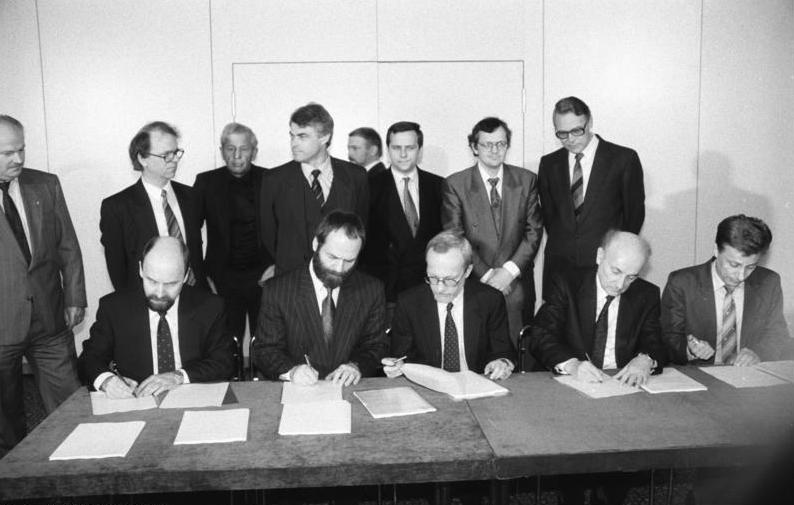
- Ministers sign the coalition agreement, 12 April 1990. From left to right: Rainer Eppelmann, Markus Meckel, Lothar de Maizière, Hans-Wilhelm Ebeling, Rainer Ortleb
- Date formed: 12 April 1990
- Date dissolved: 2 October 1990 (5 months and 20 days)

People and organisations
- President of the People's Chamber: Sabine Bergmann-Pohl (CDU)
- Minister-President: Lothar de Maizière (CDU)
- Deputy Minister-President: Peter-Michael Diestel (DSU)
- Member party: CDU, DSU, DA, BFD, ~~SPD~~ (left)
- Status in legislature: Majority coalition government (March–August 1990) Minority government (August–October 1990)

History
- Election: 1990 general election
- Predecessor: Modrow
- Successor: Kohl III (reunified Germany)

The cabinet of Lothar de Maizière was the last cabinet of East Germany before German reunification. It was formed on 12 April 1990, following the general election in March, and existed until reunification with West Germany on 3 October 1990.

It was originally a grand coalition government between the centre-right Alliance for Germany (Christian Democratic Union (CDU), German Social Union (DSU), Democratic Awakening (DA)), the centre-left Social Democratic Party in the GDR (SPD), and the centre Association of Free Democrats (BFD). On 16 August, three ministers were sacked from the cabinet. In protest, the SPD left the coalition and their remaining ministers resigned on 20 August.

== Composition ==
Cabinet
Portfolio	Minister	Took office	Left office	Party
Minister-President	Lothar de Maizière	12 April 1990	2 October 1990	CDU
Minister in the Office of the Minister-President	Klaus Reichenbach	12 April 1990	2 October 1990	CDU
Deputy Minister-President; Minister for Interior Affairs	Peter-Michael Diestel	12 April 1990	2 October 1990	DSU
Minister for Foreign Affairs	Markus Meckel	12 April 1990	20 August 1990	SPD
Minister for Foreign Affairs	Lothar de Maizière	22 August 1990	2 October 1990	CDU
Minister for Disarmament and Defence	Rainer Eppelmann	12 April 1990	2 October 1990	DA
Minister for Health	Jürgen Kleditzsch	12 April 1990	2 October 1990	CDU
Minister for Labour and Social Affairs	Regine Hildebrandt	12 April 1990	20 August 1990	SPD
Minister for Labour and Social Affairs	Jürgen Kleditzsch (acting)	22 August 1990	2 October 1990	CDU
Minister for Construction, Urban Development and Housing	Axel Viehweger	12 April 1990	28 September 1990	BFD
Minister for Education and Science	Hans Joachim Meyer	12 April 1990	2 October 1990	Independent
Minister for Nutrition, Agriculture and Forestry	Peter Pollack	12 April 1990	16 August 1990	Independent
Minister for Nutrition, Agriculture and Forestry	Peter Kauffold (acting)	16 August 1990	20 August 1990	SPD
Minister for Nutrition, Agriculture and Forestry	Gottfried Haschke (acting)	20 August 1990	2 October 1990	CDU
Minister for Family and Women	Christa Schmidt	12 April 1990	2 October 1990	CDU
Minister of Finance	Walter Romberg	12 April 1990	16 August 1990	SPD
Minister of Finance	Werner Skowron (acting)	16 August 1990	2 October 1990	CDU
Minister for Research and Technology	Frank Terpe	12 April 1990	20 August 1990	SPD
Minister for Research and Technology	Hans Joachim Meyer (acting)	22 August 1990	2 October 1990	Independent
Minister for Trade and Tourism	Sybille Reider	12 April 1990	20 August 1990	SPD
Minister for Trade and Tourism	Lothar Engel (acting)	20 August 1990	2 October 1990	CDU
Minister for Youth and Sport	Cordula Schubert	12 April 1990	2 October 1990	CDU
Minister of Justice	Kurt Wünsche	12 April 1990	16 August 1990	BFD
Minister of Justice	Manfred Walther (acting)	16 August 1990	2 October 1990	CDU
Minister for Culture	Herbert Schirmer	12 April 1990	2 October 1990	CDU
Minister for Media Policy	Gottfried Müller	12 April 1990	2 October 1990	CDU
Ministry of Post and Telecommunications	Emil Schnell	12 April 1990	20 August 1990	SPD
Ministry of Post and Telecommunications	Hans-Jürgen Niehof (acting)	20 August 1990	2 October 1990	FDP
Minister for Regional and Local Affairs	Manfred Preiß	12 April 1990	2 October 1990	BFD
Minister for the Environment, Nature Conservation, Energy and Nuclear Safety	Karl-Hermann Steinberg	12 April 1990	2 October 1990	CDU
Minister for Transportation	Horst Gibtner	12 April 1990	2 October 1990	CDU
Minister for Economy	Gerhard Pohl	12 April 1990	16 August 1990	CDU
Minister for Economy	Gunter Halm (acting)	16 August 1990	2 October 1990	BFD
Minister for Economic Cooperation	Hans-Wilhelm Ebeling	12 April 1990	2 October 1990	DSU

- Government spokesperson: Matthias Gehler (CDU)
- Deputy government spokesperson: Angela Merkel (DA)
