= Jürgen Kleditzsch =

German politician (born 1944)

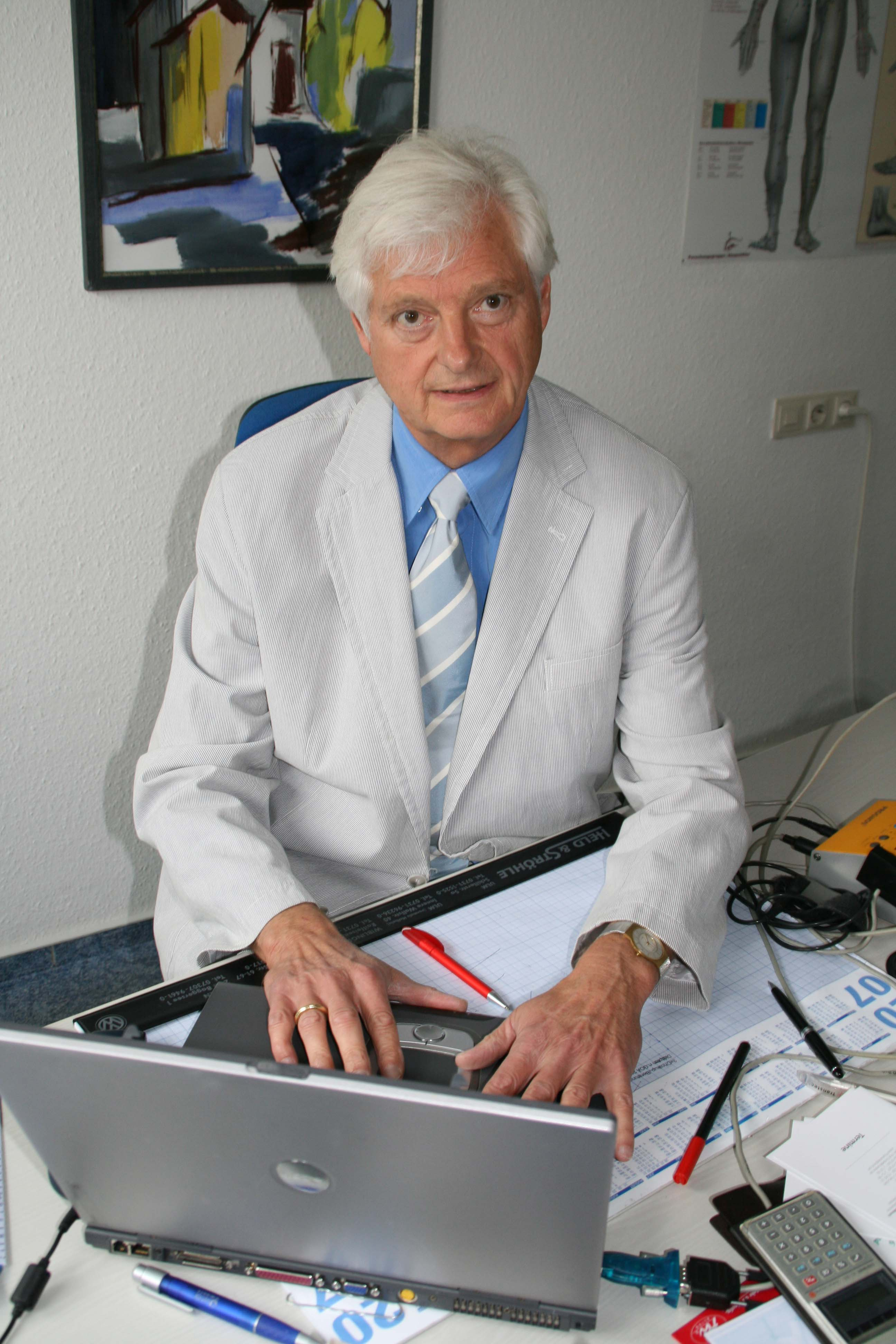
- Kleditzsch in 2007

Minister of Labor and Social Affairs
- Acting
- In office 20 August 1990 – 2 October 1990
- Minister-President: Lothar de Maizière
- Preceded by: Regine Hildebrandt
- Succeeded by: Position abolished Norbert Blüm (as Federal Minister for Labour and Social Affairs)

Minister of Health
- In office 12 April 1990 – 2 October 1990
- Minister-President: Lothar de Maizière
- Preceded by: Klaus Thielmann (Health and Social Affairs)
- Succeeded by: Position abolished Ursula Lehr (as Federal Minister for Youth, Family, Women and Health)
Parliamentary constituencies
Member of the Bundestag for Volkskammer
In office 3 October 1990 – 20 December 1990
Preceded by	Constituency established
Succeeded by	Constituency abolished
Member of the Volkskammer for Bezirk Dresden
In office 5 April 1990 – 2 October 1990
Preceded by	Constituency established
Succeeded by	Constituency abolished

Personal details
- Born: Jürgen Heinz Kleditzsch; 26 January 1944 (age 82) Bad Schandau, Free State of Saxony, Nazi Germany (now Germany)
- Party: Independent (2002–)
- Other political affiliations: Christian Democratic Union of Germany (1990–2002); Christian Democratic Union (East Germany) (1977–1990)
- Education: Karl Marx University (Dr. med.); Medizinische Akademie „Carl Gustav Carus“
- Occupation: Politician; Academic; Physician

Jürgen Kleditzsch (born 26 January 1944) is a German physician and former minister for the East German Christian Democratic Union (CDU).

He served as the GDR's last Minister of Health in the cabinet of Lothar de Maizière. He also worked as a specialist physician in the Neu-Ulm district of Gerlenhofen and now runs a private orthopedic practice in a Bad Wörishofen hotel.

== Life and career ==
=== Early career ===
Kleditzsch completed his high school diploma (Abitur) in 1962 and subsequently undertook a one-year nursing internship at the Sebnitz District Hospital. From 1963 to 1969, he studied medicine at Karl Marx University in Leipzig. After earning his doctorate in medicine, he trained as a specialist in physiotherapy from 1969 to 1974 at the Occupational Health Service at uranium mining company SDAG Wismut and the Kneipp Health Resort in Berggießhübel. He completed his training as a specialist in physiotherapy in 1974. Three years later, he was recognized as a specialist in orthopedics. In 1981, he earned his habilitation with a thesis on bone healing.

From 1974 to 1989, he worked at the Medical Academy of Dresden, initially as the head of the Physiotherapy Department at the Orthopedic Clinic, and in 1978, he was appointed senior physician of the clinic. In 1985, he took on a teaching position in physiotherapy at the Medical Academy of Dresden and was appointed associate professor in 1987. From 1988, he led various work and research groups.

=== Bloc party politician ===
Kleditzsch joined the East German Christian Democratic Union (CDU), a bloc party beholden to the ruling Socialist Unity Party (SED), in 1977. From 1984, he was a member of the Bezirk Dresden CDU board, and from 1987, he was the head of its Health Policy Working Group. In December 1989, during the Peaceful Revolution, he was appointed Bezirksarzt of Bezirk Dresden, making him the full-time head of the Bezirk's health department and a member of the Bezirk government.

=== de Maizière Government ===
In the first free elections in the GDR, Kleditzsch was elected to the Volkskammer in March 1990 for Bezirk Dresden, being the first-placed candidate on the CDU's list. He was thereafter appointed as Minister of Health in the cabinet of Lothar de Maizière, serving from April until October 1990.

Kleditzsch had to deal with the GDR's crumbling health care system during his tenure, many hospitals being in a state of disrepair and suffering from severe labor and material shortages. These problems were exacerbated by the wave of refugees in the summer of 1989. His main concern was to ensure the stability of medical care and at the same time to push ahead with the restructuring of structures. In the few months leading up to the unification of the two German states, around a dozen laws and regulations are passed that create the legal framework for the transfer of the GDR's health care system to a unified Germany. From August 1990, he also served as acting Minister for Labor and Social Affairs in the aftermath of the SPD and their ministers leaving the coalition government.

=== Reunified Germany ===
Kleditzsch was one of 144 Volkskammer members co-opted to the Bundestag following German reunification on 3 October 1990. He remained a member of the Bundestag until the end of the 11th legislative period in December 1990, retiring from politics. On 15 September 1990, Kleditzsch had been appointed full professor of physiotherapy at the Medical Academy in Dresden and, with the founding of the Institute for Physical Medicine at the Medical Academy in 1990, he was appointed director of the institution. In 1992, he left the Medical Academy at his own request. He left the CDU in 2002.

Kleditzsch worked as a specialist physician in the Neu-Ulm district of Gerlenhofen and now runs a private orthopedic practice in a Bad Wörishofen hotel.
