= Hans Joachim Meyer =

German politician (1936–2024)

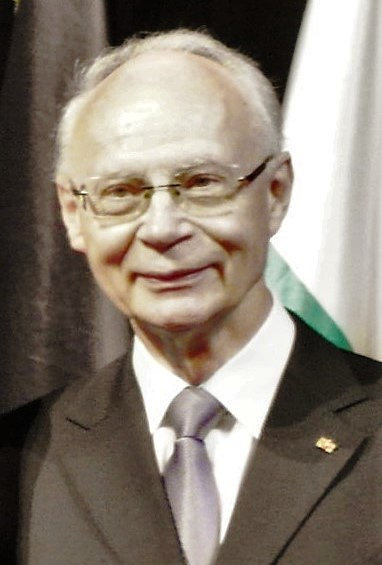
- Meyer in 2015
- Born: 13 October 1936; Rostock, Germany
- Died: 29 March 2024 (aged 87); Potsdam, Germany
- Education: Humboldt University of Berlin
- Occupations: Academic teacher; Minister of education
- Organizations: Humboldt University of Berlin; De Maizière cabinet; Ministry of Culture in Saxony; Central Committee of German Catholics
- Political party: CDU (East Germany) (1952–1961); CDU (from 1990)
- Awards: Order of Merit of the Federal Republic of Germany; Order of Merit of the Free State of Saxony; Order of St. Gregory the Great

Hans Joachim Meyer (13 October 1936 – 29 March 2024) was a German linguist and CDU politician. When East Germany's authorities interrupted his law studies in Potsdam after six terms, he turned to English and American studies at the Humboldt University of Berlin where he then lectured and researched from 1964, with a habilitation in 1981, and as professor of applied linguistics from 1985 to 1990.

He served in the cabinet of Lothar de Maiziére as the last East German Minister for Education and the Arts. After German reunification he became State Minister for Sciences and the Arts in the state government of Saxony. In addition, he served as President of the Central Committee of German Catholics (ZdK) from 1997 to 2009.

== Life and career ==
Hans Joachim Meyer was born on 13 October 1936 in Rostock. His father ran a pharmacy, and his mother was a teacher. He grew up in an area that after 1945 was part of the Soviet occupation zone which became the German Democratic Republic (East Germany) in October 1949. After successfully completing school with the Abitur in Rostock he moved to the Berlin area. He studied law at the Deutsche Akademie für Staats- und Rechtswissenschaft der DDR in Potsdam between 1955 and 1958 but was excluded after six terms before he could complete his degree because he "failed to connect with the working class" (wegen "mangelnder Verbindung zur Arbeiterklasse"). The real issue, he later told an interviewer, was his commitment to the Catholic Church. His decision while still at school to join the CDU back in 1952, at a time when the ruling party was engaged in a robust campaign to take control of rival political parties, would already have drawn him to the attention of the authorities as a potential dissident in the making. For the next year he worked as an "assistant" at the VEB Lokomotivbau Potsdam-Babelsberg, a nearby rail-locomotive plant. After that, resigning from the CDU in 1961, he was able to resume his university studies, now embarking on a course at the Humboldt University of Berlin in English and American studies and history. His decision to select subjects regarded by the authorities as less political was vindicated; he was able to complete his course with a degree in 1964. He remained at the university as a lecturer and senior research assistant between 1964 and 1982. He received his doctorate in 1971. His dissertation was, again, resolutely non-political: it comprised a semantic analysis of the modern English verb prefix "Up" when compared to related prefixes in English and German ("Semantische Analyse der modernenglischen Verbalpartikel "up" im Vergleich zu verwandten englischen und deutschen Verbalpartikeln"). Ten years later his habilitation, received in 1981, could have opened the way to a lifelong university career, had events not intervened. He was assigned to the foreign languages section between 1973 and 1977, becoming deputy director for education and training. Between 1978 and 1990 he headed up the intensive languages training section at the university. He also held an appointment as Professor of Applied Linguistics from 1985 to 1990.

During his academic career in East Berlin Meyer was engaged with the Catholic Church in Germany. Between 1973 and 1975 he served as a member of the Dresden Pastoral Synod. Between 1976 and 1982 he worked with the Pastoral Council for the Bishopric of East Berlin.

=== Wende ===
After the Peaceful Revolution, the 1990 East German general election was the country's first free and fair election. Shortly after, Meyer received and accepted an invitation to join the new government headed up by Lothar de Maizière, despite not being a member of any political party, and despite not having stood for election to the Volkskammer national parliament. Between 12 April and 3 October 1990, Meyer served as the German Democratic Republic's last Minister for Education and the Arts. His responsibilities included participation as leader of the East German delegation at the Gemeinsame Bildungskommission between May and September 1990. The commission was mandated to adapt an education system that would be implemented across a unified Germany. The commission's output was summarized in the Reunification Treaty (Articles 37 & 38) which came into force in October 1990 and was then implemented both at government level and on the ground. In August 1990, the East German CDU formally merged back into the CDU from which it had been forcibly separated, and Meyer took the opportunity to rejoin the party from which, out of "disappointment over the party's limited political options", he had resigned in 1961.

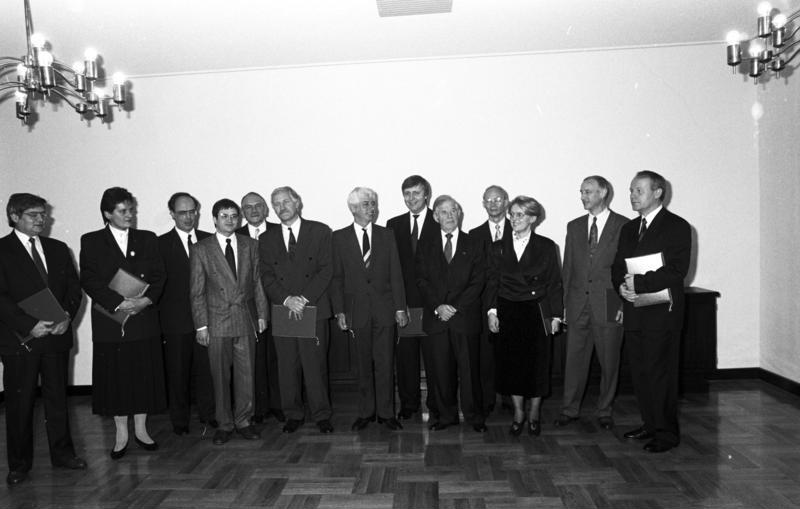
1990 Cabinet of Saxony

Directly following reunification Meyer joined the regional government of Kurt Biedenkopf in Saxony, serving between November 1990 and May 2002 as Saxony's Minister of State for Sciences and the Arts. For lay Catholics, he became leader of the "Gemeinsamer Aktionsausschuss katholischer Christen in der DDR" and a member of the Central Committee of German Catholics, serving as its president from 1995 to 2009. In this function, he was the host of the first Ökumenischer Kirchentag, an ecumenical church gathering held in Berlin in 2003.

=== Personal life ===
Meyer lived in Potsdam. He published his memoir in 2015, In keiner Schublade.

He died in Potsdam on 29 March 2024, at the age of 87.

== Awards and honours ==
- 2002: Honorary doctorate from the TU Dresden
- 2003: Honorary membership of the Saxony Academy of Arts and Sciences
- 2005: Order of Merit of the Federal Republic of Germany
- 2007: Leibniz Medal
- 2008: Johann Walter Plakette
- 2013: Hans-Olaf-Henkel Prize
- 2015: Order of Merit of the Free State of Saxony
- 2017: Order of St. Gregory the Great

== Publications ==
- with Hanna Harnisch: Zur Untersuchung von Kommunikationsverfahren unter linguistischem Aspekt. Zum Problem der kommunikativ-funktionalen oder thematischen Zuordnung von Verben (= Martin Luther University Halle-Wittenberg. research collektive Kommunikativ-Funktionale Sprachbetrachtung und Fremdsprachenunterricht: Arbeitsbericht, 46). Halle 1977
- Am Ende der Ichgesellschaft.
- In keiner Schublade – Erfahrungen im geteilten und vereinten Deutschland
