= Hannelore Mensch =

East German politician

Minister of Labor and Wages
- In office 18 November 1989 – 12 April 1990
- Chairman of the Council of Ministers: Hans Modrow
- Preceded by: Position established
- Succeeded by: Regine Hildebrandt (Labor and Social Affairs)

First Deputy Lord Mayor of East Berlin
- In office June 1978 – December 1989
- Lord Mayor: Erhard Krack
- Preceded by: Horst Palm
- Succeeded by: Roland Tränkner

Secretary of the Magistrate of East Berlin
- In office April 1973 – June 1978
- Lord Mayor: Herbert Fechner; Erhard Krack
- Preceded by: Edith Baumann
- Succeeded by: Kurt Schumann

Personal details
- Born: Hannelore Bosch; 16 June 1937 (age 89) Neu Zachun, State of Mecklenburg, Nazi Germany (now Mecklenburg-Vorpommern, Germany)
- Party: Socialist Unity Party (1959–1989)
- Education: "Karl Marx" Party Academy (Dipl.-Ges.-Wiss.)
- Occupation: Politician; Farmer

Hannelore Mensch (born Hannelore Bosch; 16 June 1937 in Neu Zachun) is a former East German politician. She served as the German Democratic Republic's Minister for Work and Wages in 1989/90.

== Life ==
Hannelore Bosch was born in the north of what was then the central part of Germany. Her father was a farmer and she had a rural upbringing. The Second World War started when she was 2 and ended when she was not quite 8, after which her childhood was spent growing up in the Soviet occupation zone in what remained of Germany. While she was 12 the occupation zone became the German Democratic Republic, formally founded in October 1949. Between 1953 and 1956 Hannelore attended an agricultural college in Ludwigslust, emerging with a qualification in Agriculture. In 1958, she took a job as a Planner with MTS Brüsewitz, a state-administered agricultural machinery depot serving the district. From 1958 till 1962 she served as FDJ secretary and as divisional leader with the Schwerin rural district council. In 1959, she joined East Germany's ruling SED (party).

She worked in the Agriculture Department with the Berlin city council from 1962 till 1963, moving on to become a department head with the Party Regional Leadership between 1963 and 1973. Meanwhile, she undertook a correspondence course with the "Karl Marx" Party Academy which led her to a degree in Social Sciences. Promotion followed, and from 1973 till 1978 she was a Berlin city councilor and senior secretary with the council. From 1979 till 1989 she served as first deputy mayor of Berlin. During the final months of one-party government in the German Democratic Republic, from November 1989 till March 1990, she entered national politics, serving in the Modrow government as Minister for Work and Wages.

In 1993 Hannelore Mensch was convicted of local government election fraud by the Berlin district Court and sentenced to one year of supervised liberty ("probation").

== Awards and honours ==
- 1971 Patriotic Order of Merit in bronze
- 1981 Patriotic Order of Merit in silver
- 1987 Patriotic Order of Merit in gold
