= Cordula Schubert =

German politician

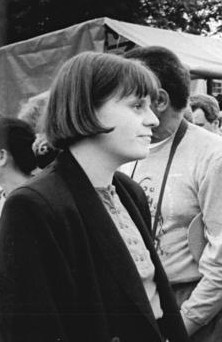
Cordula Schubert in 1990

Cordula Schubert (born 21 May 1959) is a German politician. She was a government minister in the last cabinet of East Germany (de Maizière cabinet), and after German reunification worked for the Konrad Adenauer Foundation and the Free State of Saxony's Ministry of Social Affairs.

Schubert was born and grew up in Karl-Marx-Stadt (now Chemnitz). She completed vocational training as a nurse in 1978 and later, from 1983, studied medical pedagogy at the Humboldt University of Berlin. With her Diplom completed in 1987, she taught anatomy and physiology in Karl-Marx-Stadt. In 1982 Schubert had joined the Christian Democratic Union.

Aged 30, Cordula Schubert was elected to the Volkskammer in the 1990 election, and subsequently was appointed as Minister for Youth and Sport in the government of Lothar de Maizière. She held the office until reunification with West Germany on 3 October 1990, 199 days after the election. One of Schubert's responsibilities was to disband the DTSB. She faced significant resistance from inside that organisation.
