= Regine Hildebrandt =

German biologist and politician (1941–2001)

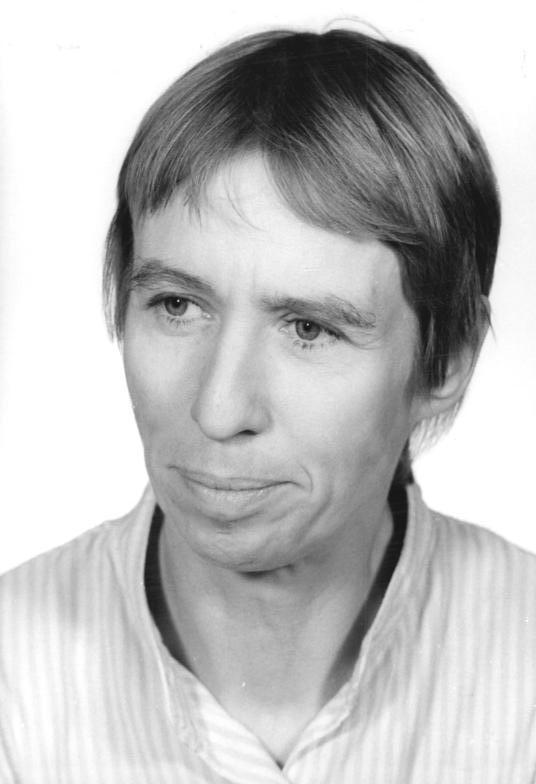
- Hildebrandt in 1990

Minister for Labour, Social Affairs, Health and Women of Brandenburg
- In office 1 November 1990 – 13 October 1999
- Minister-President: Manfred Stolpe
- Preceded by: Office established
- Succeeded by: Alwin Ziel

Minister of Labour and Social Affairs of East Germany
- In office 12 April 1990 – 20 August 1990
- Minister-President: Lothar de Maizière
- Preceded by: Klaus Thielmann (Health and Social Affairs); Hannelore Mensch (Labor and Wages)
- Succeeded by: Jürgen Kleditzsch (acting)
Parliamentary constituencies
Member of the Landtag of Brandenburg
In office 11 October 1994 – 12 October 1999
Preceded by	Constituency established
Succeeded by	Angelika Thiel-Vigh
Constituency	Elbe-Elster I
In office 26 October 1990 – 11 October 1994
Preceded by	Constituency established
Succeeded by	multi-member district
Constituency	Social Democratic Party List
Member of the Volkskammer for East Berlin
In office 5 April 1990 – 2 October 1990
Preceded by	Constituency established
Succeeded by	Constituency abolished

Personal details
- Born: Regine Radischewski; 26 April 1941 Berlin-Mitte, Berlin, Nazi Germany (now Germany)
- Died: 26 November 2001 (aged 60) Woltersdorf, Brandenburg, Germany
- Cause of death: Breast cancer
- Party: Social Democratic Party (1990–2001)
- Other political affiliations: Social Democratic Party in the GDR (1989–1990)
- Spouse: Jörg Hildebrandt (m. 1966)
- Children: Frauke; Jan; Elske
- Education: Humboldt University of Berlin
- Occupation: Politician; Biologist; Scientist

Regine Hildebrandt (née Radischewski; 26 April 1941 – 26 November 2001) was a German biologist and politician (Social Democratic Party of Germany).

== Life ==
=== Early years ===
==== Wartime in Germany ====
Regine Radischewski was born in Berlin during the war, the second of her parents' two recorded children. Her father was a pianist who worked as an accompanist at the National Ballet Academy.

Her mother would later own a small tobacconist shop. When she was two the family were evacuated from central Berlin to countryside far to the east of Germany, and shortly after that they were bombed out, losing most of their material possessions.

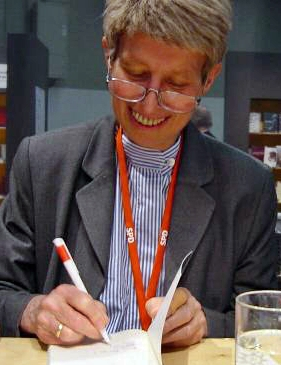
Regine Hildebrandt at SPD-convention in Nuremberg in November 2001, a few days before her death.

==== Growing up ====
The war ended in May 1945 and the family ended up back in Berlin. For the first five or six years of her schooling she attended a school in a western occupation zone of the city ("West Berlin"), but as the political division between the Soviet occupation zone and the western occupation zones became more stark and, it seemed, more permanent, her parents opted on her behalf for a school in the Soviet zone in what had by now become known as East Berlin. The family home was in the city centre along Bernauer Straße ("Bernau Street") which formed the (initially hard to spot) political border between East Berlin and West Berlin, and afforded Regine a ring-side seat in the cold wall drama until September 1961 when the family were forcibly relocated in connection with the building of the Berlin Wall. In October 1961 she co-founded and joined the interdenominational choir at Berlin's (Protestant) Cathedral, which now flourished under the musical direction of a man called Herbert Hildebrand.

=== Middle years ===
==== The student ====
From 1959 to 1964, she studied biology at the Humboldt University in East Berlin.

She had never joined the Free German Youth (FDJ/Freie Deutsche Jugend), which was in effect the youth wing of the young country's ruling SED party. Her failure to join seems to have been a result of timetable clashes involving her commitment to singing in the church choir. Failure to enroll in the FDJ had nevertheless led to her application for the university course to be initially rejected; and subsequent failure as an adult to become a Party Member would constrain her career opportunities right up until 1989.

==== A career in research ====
Between 1964 and 1978 Regine Radischewski worked in a management position involving Quality Control in the pharmacology department of VEB Berlin-Chemie, a major conglomerate in East Berlin. Hildebrandt combined her responsibilities in the pharmaceuticals department with a medicines research project at the Humboldt University which led to her receiving her doctorate in 1978. In 1978 she took a senior research position at Berlin's Centre for the Study of Metabolism Illnesses and Diabetes, heading up the Diabetes department until 1990. During this period she had numerous research papers published.

==== Family matters ====
During these years she also found time, in 1966 to marry Jörg Hildebrandt, brother of the musical director of the choir in which they sang. The two had known each other through the church since 1950: they had also been near neighbours, with a shared childhood experience of living along the East–West front-line before 1961. The marriage produced three children, born in 1969, 1971 and 1974. Her research career left her with enough space to devote time to the family, which was very important to her. Her husband later recalled that they ate together each evening six days per week, and on Sundays had a family lunch in the middle of the day after getting back from church. When she died, aged 60, she would still be living with younger family members in a large "multi-generational family house" they had been able to have built after 1990.

==== Interaction with the state ====
The family participated the political life of the one-party dictatorship only when they felt they had to. They did not vote in the country's sham elections because §22 of the constitution did not oblige them to vote (although the 1986 General election resulted, typically, in a reported turnout of 99.74%). Regine Hildebrand did join the national Trade Union Federation (FDGB/Freier Deutscher Gewerkschaftsbund) because not to have done so would have deprived her research colleagues of vital funding. When fraternal tanks appeared on the streets of Prague to crush political reform, the Hildebrandts joined in a protest demonstration outside the Czechoslovak embassy in Berlin.

They would write letters of protest to the Party Central Committee and to Neues Deutschland, the party's mass-circulation official daily newspaper. Hildebrand assiduously read Neues Deutschland and followed other official media, if only to keep herself up to date with The Party's politically correct linguistic contrivances of the moment. The family never owned a television set, but news came from radio programmes broadcast from West Berlin or London, and from friends who visited from the west and were permitted (unlike East German citizens) to return to the west afterwards.

=== Politics ===
The summer of 1989 brought a dramatic change in her life when she, together with her husband, Jörg, was among the co-founders of Democracy Now, which sought an alliance of Christians and critical Marxists "to think about our future, to think about a society based on solidarity".

Quotation

"I was never really interested in politics before 1989. But when the changes came I saw a necessity: if something needs to be done, you need people to do it."
"Ich habe mich eigentlich nie für Politik interessiert. Das kam nur durch die Wende. Das war die Einsicht in die Notwendigkeit: Wenn nun etwas anders werden soll, müssen das auch andere Leute machen."

Regine Hildebrand

Quotation

"Do you know why children in the west need an extra year to complete their schooling, compared to the ones in the east. No? Please don't be angry: in the west a year is taken up with theatrics!"
"Wissen Sie, warum die Schüler im Westen ein Jahr mehr zum Abitur brauchen als im Osten? Nein? Bitte nicht böse sein: Weil im Westen ein Jahr Schauspielerei dabei ist!"

Regine Hildebrand

Quotation

"Rejoicing at the birth of a child is one important element in a fulfilled life, and at the end death self-evidently has its place within the overall human experience. My great concern is that it should be possible to undergo the process both within the family assisted by out-patient support, and indeed, where necessary, in a suitable hospice."
"So wie es dazu gehört, sich zu freuen, wenn ein Kind geboren wird, so selbstverständlich muß auch der Tod am Ende eines erfüllten Lebens für die Menschen stehen. Daß dies sowohl in den Familien mit ambulanter Unterstützung oder eben in den entsprechenden Hospizen möglich ist, ist mir ein ganz großes Anliegen."

Regine Hildebrand

Quotation

"At the level of national policy it is important to improve the legal framework so that you don't have to go on being wired up to all those machines if you no longer want to be. Part of that is the right to end your life through suicide if absolutely nothing works any more."
"Auf bundespolitischer Ebene ist es wichtig, die rechtlichen Voraussetzungen zu verbessern, daß man eben nicht an Maschinen angeschlossen wird, wenn man dies nicht mehr will. Dazu gehört auch das Recht, sein Leben durch Selbsttötung zu beenden, wenn es denn gar nicht mehr geht."

Regine Hildebrand

Quotation

"The same things have always been important for me. In years of the German Democratic Republic I tried to live according to what I believed was right: in my work, with the family, with friends, with the Cathedral choir. (...) For me, what mattered was always human relationships and shared support. That feeling intensified after 1989, because people found mass-unemployment and the changes in social relationships between individuals intensely unsettling. My life is closely bound up with my profession, with participating in the family, and also with the attempt to give of myself and to make a difference to something. I'm not going to let up now. What matters is not the length of a life, but that you should conduct your life in the way that you believe is right."
"Mir waren immer die gleichen Sachen wichtig. Zu DDR-Zeiten habe ich versucht, so zu leben, wie ich es für richtig hielt: mit den Säulen Beruf, Familie, Freunde, Domkantorei. (...) Mir war immer Mitmenschlichkeit wichtig. Das hat sich nach der Wende sogar verstärkt, weil Massenarbeitslosigkeit und die Veränderung der sozialen Verhältnisse die Menschen extrem verunsichert haben. Mein Leben ist eng verbunden mit dem Beruf, mit dem Zusammensein mit der Familie, auch mit dem Versuch, etwas auszustrahlen und etwas zu bewegen. Das lasse ich mir auch jetzt nicht abschneiden. Entscheidend ist nicht die Länge des Lebens, sondern daß man sein Leben weiterführen kann, so wie man es für richtig hält."

Regine Hildebrand

==== The Social Democrats ====
On 12 October 1989 she joined the Social Democratic Party (SPD) which (in East Germany) had been re-founded five days earlier. The Hildebrandts valued the embracing compassionate socialism of the moderate left which had been nurtured and demonstrated by iconic (western) SPD figures from the recent past such as Kurt Schumacher and Willy Brandt. A year later, following reunification, in October 1990 the party would merge formally with the West German Social Democratic Party (SDP).

==== National ministerial office ====
1990 was the year in which, for rather less than a year, she became an important Social Democratic participant in the national politics of the German Democratic Republic (GDR). National elections in the GDR had traditionally operated according to a single list system which offered the voters only one list of (carefully preselected) candidates. Anyone wishing to vote against the list could do so by placing the ballot paper in a separate ballot box while the officials looked on: few did. But on 18 March 1990 the German Democratic Republic conducted its first (and as matters turned out, last) democratically configured general election. The Social Democrats took 21.9% of the vote which entitled them to 88 seats in the country's first freely elected National legislative assembly (Volkskammer). One of the seats went to Hildebrand, representing the Berlin electoral district. She also joined the coalition government of Lothar de Maizière, serving between April and August 1990 as the East German Minister for Labour and Social Affairs.

A political decision had been taken to convert East German currency into western Marks at a one-for one rate (except in respect of very large amounts), and Hildebrandt's priority as a government minister was tackling growing unemployment in east Germany, following economic disruption associated with the ongoing reunification process.

The governing coalition started to splinter in August 1990 leading to the withdrawal of the Social Democrats from it, as a result of which Regine Hildebrandt terminated her career as a government minister at the national level. The next month, however, in 1990 she was elected to the national committee of the SPD (for the whole of Germany, even though national reunification would not be formally enacted until October).

==== Minister in Brandenburg ====
Hildebrandt now became a key SPD figure in the state politics of Brandenburg. In October 1990, the state tier of government was reintroduced to what had been the German Democratic Republic, and as part of the process elections took place for a new state parliament in Brandenburg on 26 October. Hildebrandt was elected as an SPD member and then appointed to ministerial office under minister-president Manfred Stolpe: from 1 November 1990 onwards she served as Brandenburg's Minister for Labour, Social affairs, Health and Women, in effect an expanded version of the ministerial portfolio she had been handling nationally earlier in the year.

She was considered by some to be a popular and effective minister, whom they described as often hitting the headlines with less than diplomatic outbursts while being forcefully persuasive with key colleagues when, as often happened, issues within her ministerial ambit came down to arguments about funding.

In the 1999 Brandenburg state election the Social Democrats lost their absolute majority and minister-president Manfred Stolpe prepared to form a "grand coalition" with the centre-right CDU party. Hildebrand was already seriously ill and had strongly campaigned for an alternative alliance, with the left-wing PDS. She resigned from the state government.

The Hildebrandts and the state prime minister Manfred Stolpe had known one another since the 1960s through their church connections, though they had not been aware at every level of Stolpe's complicated and possibly at times collaborative relationship with the Ministry for State Security during the years of the dictatorship. After her resignation from the government Hildebrand and Stolpe would continue to treasure one another's friendship, and remain political allies, until Hildebrandt's death in 2001.

Nationally in December 1999 and again in November 2001, a few weeks before she died, Hildebrand topped the polls in the elections to the national executive of the Social Democratic Party.

== Death ==
In July 1996 it became known that Regine Hildebrandt had breast cancer. She died at age 60 on 26 November 2001 in Woltersdorf, Brandenburg.

== Honours and awards ==
- 1993: Gustav Heinemann Citizenship Prize
- 1993: Hamm Brücher Medal
- 1997: "Golden Hen"
- 2000: Fritz Bauer Prize
- 2001: Order of Merit of the Federal Republic of Germany
