= Gottfried Müller (politician) =

German theologian and politician

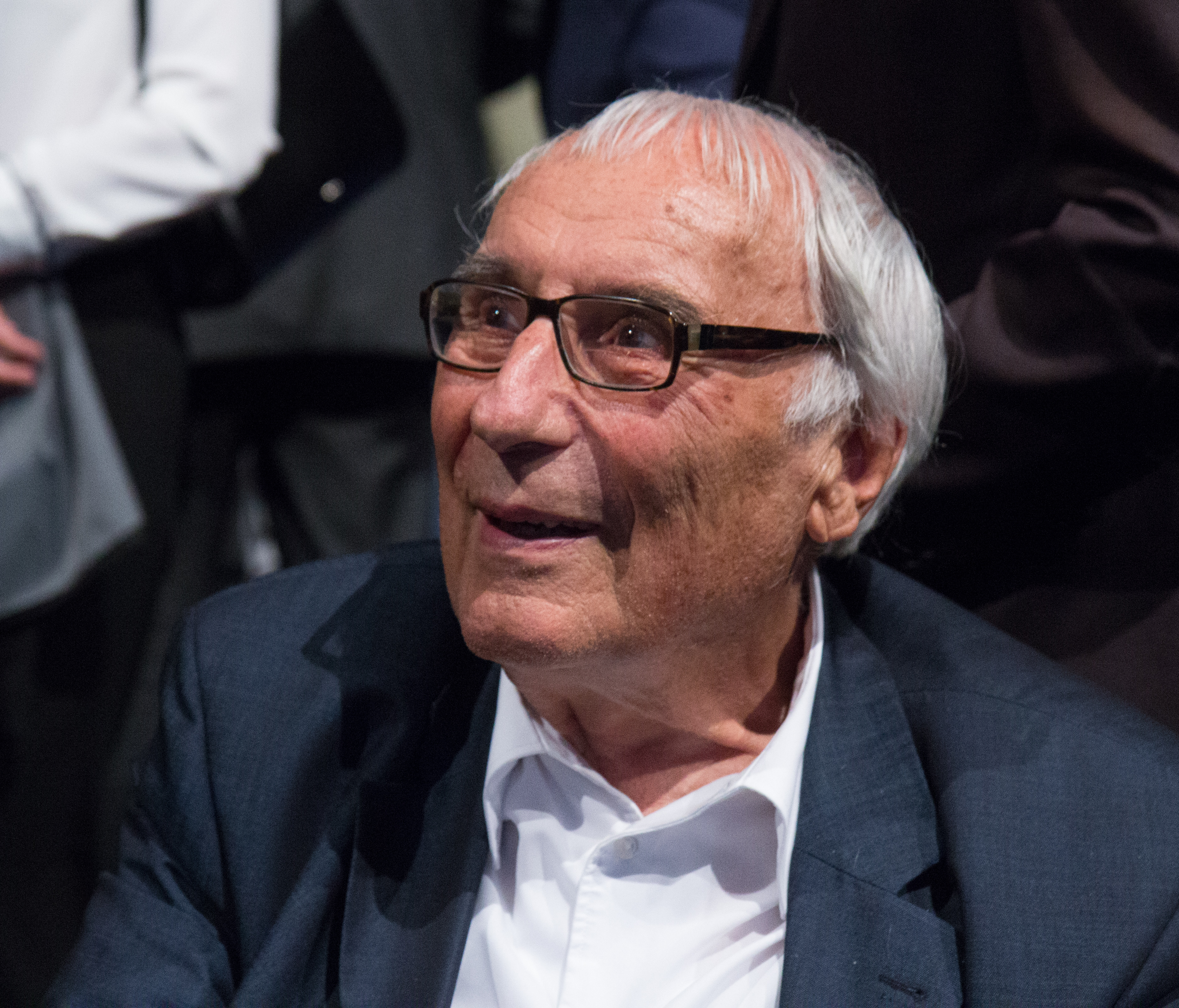
Müller in 2017

Gottfried Bertold Paul Adolf Müller (born 16 August 1934 in Schweina) is a German theologian and former politician (Christian Democratic Union (East Germany); from 1990 Christian Democratic Union). He was Minister for Media Policy of the GDR in the cabinet of Lothar de Maizière, and later President of the State Parliament of Thuringia.

Gottfried Müller studied Protestant theology from 1953 to 1960 at the Karl Marx University in Leipzig and the Friedrich Schiller University in Jena. In 1964 he received his doctorate in theology. From 1960 to 1972 he was a pastor in various congregations of the Evangelical Lutheran Church in Thuringia. In 1972 he joined the GDR CDU and became head of the Altenburg Bible Institute. From 1981 to 1990 he was editor-in-chief of the Thuringian church newspaper Glaube und Heimat and from 1987 to April 1990 he was head of the Wartburg Verlag Jena. Müller was temporarily a member of the Jena district executive committee and the Gera district executive committee of the Eastern CDU.

Gottfried Müller was the initiator and main author of the so-called "letter from Weimar" (together with the three other signatories Christine Lieberknecht, Martin Kirchner and GDR lawyer Martina Huhn from Bad Lausick), who called for the democratic renewal of the GDR CDU and thus made the peaceful revolution in the GDR possible. From December 1989 to October 1990 he was deputy GDR CDU chairman and from April to October 1990 Minister for Media Policy of the GDR.

From October 1990 to October 1994 he was President of the Thuringian State Parliament and President of the Chamber of Churches and Monasteries in Erfurt until his retirement in 1999.
