= Manfred Preiß =

German politician (born 1939)

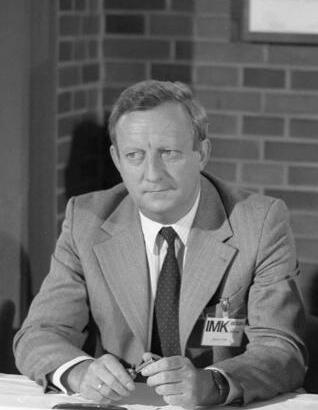
- Preiß at the Interior Ministers Conference in 1990

Minister for Regional and Local Affairs
- In office 12 April 1990 – 2 Oktober 1990
- Minister-President: Lothar de Maizière
- Preceded by: Peter Moreth (Local Government Bodies)
- Succeeded by: Office abolished Jürgen Klingbeil (as head of the Joint Office of the States for State and Local Affairs)

State Secretary in the Ministry for Local Government Bodies
- In office 11 January 1990 – 12 April 1990
- Chairman of the Council of Ministers: Hans Modrow
- Minister: Peter Moreth
- Preceded by: Position established
- Succeeded by: Jürgen Klingbeil (Ministry for Regional and Local Affairs)

Personal details
- Born: Manfred Preiß; October 22, 1939 (age 86) Wernigerode, Province of Saxony, Free State of Prussia, Nazi Germany (now Saxony-Anhalt, Germany)
- Party: Free Democratic Party (1990–)
- Other political affiliations: Association of Free Democrats (1990); Liberal Democratic Party of Germany (1964–1990)
- Children: 2
- Education: Ingenieurschule für Maschinenbau und Elektrotechnik Magdeburg; Humboldt University of Berlin
- Occupation: Politician; Businessman; Civil Servant; Jurist; Locomotive Locksmith
- Other political offices held: 1986–1990: Deputy Chairman, Bezirk Magdeburg Council; 1981–1990: Member, Bezirk Magdeburg Council; 1970–1979: Member, Blankenburg City Council

Manfred Preiß (born 22 October 1939) is a German politician and businessman. He was Minister for Regional and Local Affairs in the last East German government, overseeing the creation of the new states in preparation of German reunification.

== Personal life ==
Preiß was born and raised in Wernigerode, Prussia, now Saxony-Anhalt. In 1957, he completed an apprenticeship as locomotive locksmith at RAW Blankenburg, a train repair shop in Blankenburg (Harz). He further qualified himself at the engineering school in Magdeburg from 1961 til 1964. After additional training at the Friedrich Schiller University Jena, he worked as safety engineer at a pulp and paper factory in Blankenstein. He returned to RAW Blankenburg in 1971, where he worked as a technologist until 1984. He distance studied jurisprudence extra-occupationally at the Humboldt University of Berlin from 1978 until 1984.

== Political career ==
=== Local politics ===
In 1964, Preiß joined the LDPD, a bloc party beholden to the ruling Socialist Unity Party. From 1970 to 1979, he served on the Blankenburg City Council for the party. Later, from 1981 to 1990, he concurrently served on the Bezirk Magdeburg Council and the LDPD's Bezirk board. In 1986, he was made deputy chairman of the Bezirk Magdeburg Council under Siegfried Grünwald, responsible for housing.

=== East German cabinet and re-establishment of states ===
After the Wende, Preiß was appointed State Secretary in the Ministry for Local Government Bodies in the transitional government of Hans Modrow in January 1990. After the elections in March, Preiß succeeded Minister Peter Moreth, who had been appointed President of the Treuhandanstalt in March.

Preiß, who headed the renamed Ministry for Regional and Local Affairs, was tasked with the re-establishment of state structures, a legal necessity for reunification and demanded by many citizens.

Preiß wanted the new states to be capable of surviving on their own economically and thus favored a three-state solution. Nevertheless the commission on administrative reform Volker Schemmel from the SPD headed first publicly proposed a four-state solution without Saxony-Anhalt; most or all of Preiß's Bezirk Magdeburg would have been ceded to the proposed state of Brandenburg, the Bezirk of Halle joining the proposed state of Saxony. This was fiercely opposed by local officials in both Bezirke, ultimately leading to the eventual final five-state solution with a state of Saxony-Anhalt, similar to the states before their 1952 abolition.

Preiß had opposed this on economic grounds, as it would split the industrial region of Leipzig-Halle between two states, weakening the area crucially. To this day, Saxony-Anhalt is the state with the lowest gross regional product (GRP) per capita of the German states.

The administrative reorganization, culminating in the passage of the State establishing act on 22 July 1990, was complicated by the fact that the states were to be created by merging the Bezirke on a district-level, yet the borders of these districts did not always align with their borders in 1947, when the states had originally been established. Plebiscite were held in the districts in question, though these plebiscites were soon controversially changed to be non-binding, with some district councils overruling them. For example, the district council of Altenburg, whose voters had chosen 53 to 45% to join Saxony, surprisingly decided to join Thuringia instead.

=== Germany ===
Preiß, whose party had eventually merged into the Free Democratic Party, was elected to the Landtag of Saxony-Anhalt in the inaugural October 1990 state election. He did not take his seat however, instead taking a job for a car service company from Braunschweig in 1991. From 1993 to his retirement in 2004, Preiß again worked as a safety engineer for a number of companies in Magdeburg.
