= Klaus Reichenbach =

German politician (born 1945)

President of the Saxony Football Association
- In office 6 October 1990 – 23 April 2016
- Preceded by: Position established
- Succeeded by: Hermann Winkler

Minister in the Minister-President's Office
- In office 12 April 1990 – 2 October 1990
- Minister-President: Lothar de Maizière
- Preceded by: Harry Möbis (as Head of the Secretariat of the Chairman of the Council of Ministers)
- Succeeded by: Position abolished Rudolf Seiters (as Head of the Federal Chancellery)
Parliamentary constituencies
Member of the Bundestag for Chemnitz II – Chemnitz-Land (Volkskammer; 1990)
In office 3 October 1990 – 10 November 1994
Preceded by	Constituency established
Succeeded by	Bernd Klaußner
Member of the Volkskammer for Bezirk Karl-Marx-Stadt
In office 5 April 1990 – 2 October 1990
Preceded by	Constituency established
Succeeded by	Constituency abolished

Personal details
- Born: Klaus Peter Reichenbach; 22 September 1945 (age 81) Altenburg, State of Thuringia, Soviet occupation zone, Allied-occupied Germany (now Thuringia, Germany)
- Party: Christian Democratic Union of Germany (1990–)
- Other political affiliations: Christian Democratic Union (East Germany) (1969–1990)
- Education: Akademie für Staats- und Rechtswissenschaft der DDR (Dipl.-Staatswiss.); Humboldt University of Berlin (Dipl.-Jur.)
- Occupation: Politician; lawyer; football administrator; textile industrialist

Klaus Reichenbach (born 22 September 1945) is a retired German football official and former politician. As the son of a prominent textile manufacturer in East Germany, he inherited his father's business in 1969 and managed several different textile firms up until the 1980s. In 1974, he became district chairman of the East German CDU in Karl-Marx-Stadt. His role within the bloc party system later drew criticism from reformers within his party, as the CDU merged with its West German counterpart.

After being elected to the Volkskammer in March 1990, Reichenbach was appointed Minister in the Office of the Minister-President in the final government of the GDR under Lothar de Maizière. In this role, he helped coordinate the negotiations that led to German reunification and was among the members co-opted to the Bundestag in October 1990. He won the Chemnitz constituency in the December 1990 German federal election, chaired the reconstituted CDU in Saxony from 1990 to 1991, and served in the Bundestag until 1994, before retiring from politics to practice law.

Since reunification, Reichenbach has been prominent in the administration of German football. He was the founding president of the Saxony Football Association from 1990 to 2016, served on the board of the German Football Association (DFB) from 1997 to 2016, and helped organize the Leipzig and Dresden venues for the 2006 FIFA World Cup and the 2011 FIFA Women's World Cup respectively. He is an honorary member of the DFB and recipient of the association’s silver and gold badges of honor.

== Life ==
=== Childhood and education ===
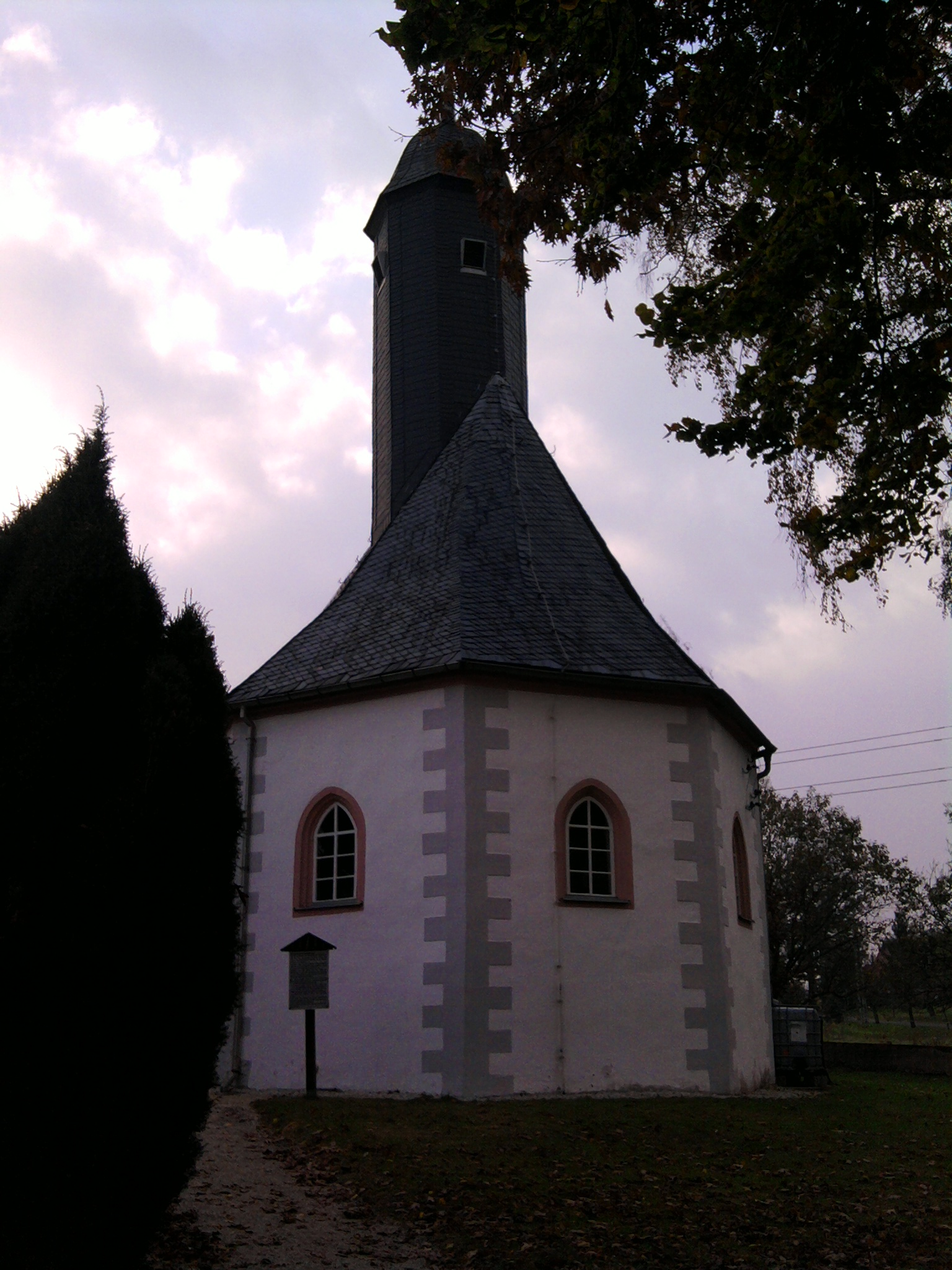
Dorfkirche St. Walburga, the Protestant village church of Wolperndorf, where Reichenbach spent part of his childhood.

Fewer than 150 days after the Nazis' surrender in World War II, Reichenbach was born into a Protestant family on 22 September 1945 in Altenburg, a city in the Soviet occupation zone and 40 kilometers (25 miles) south of Leipzig. His father, Hermann, was a prominent textile manufacturer in Saxony before, during, and after the Nazi regime, having founded the company that would become the family's main textile enterprise in 1903, as a mechanical engineering firm making circular knitting machines.

In 2020, Reichenbach claimed his father had co-founded the Christian Democratic Union of Germany in the East in 1946 after the end of the war, but this claim is unsubstantiated elsewhere. Reichenbach spent his early years on his grandparents' farm in Wolperndorf (incorporated into Jückelberg in 1973) near Nobitz. When he was two years old, his mother moved with him to his father in Hartmannsdorf, where the family owned a textile factory. He also attended primary and middle school in Hartmannsdorf.

After completing extended secondary school and earning his Abitur (university-entrance qualification), he trained as a mechanical engineer and then studied engineering economics at the textile college in Reichenbach im Vogtland.

Between 1975 and 1980, he completed a distance education program at the GDR’s now-defunct central academy for public administration, the Academy for Political and Legal Sciences in Potsdam, (Note: In 2009, German political scientist Stefan Appelius describes the academy as a de facto cadre school of the ruling Socialist Unity Party (SED).) earning a diplom in political science. From 1982 to 1986, he also completed a distance-learning law program at Humboldt University of Berlin, earning a diplom in law, and graduating as a lawyer.

=== Textile industry career ===
In a retrospective for Thüringische Landeszeitung, Reichenbach described himself as "coming from a capitalist background". His father owned the eponymous Hermann Reichenbach KG in Hartmannsdorf, which, by this point, specialized in manufacturing women's underwear. Following his father’s death in 1969, he became managing director of the family business. After its forced nationalization as a VEB in 1972, he continued to run the plant, later recounting that “the workforce was satisfied with him even under the new conditions".

Subsequently, from 1985 until June 1988, he served as the operations manager and director of the VEB Feinstrickwaren "Goldfasan" in Burgstädt, while also being chairman and director of other state-owned textile companies. As of October 2025, the Reichenbach family's textile company is still in operation in Chemnitz as "Hereiha Textil GmbH" (derived from Hermann Reichenbach in Hartmannsdorf), having been returned to private ownership after German reunification.

=== Bloc party politician ===
The year his father died (1969), Reichenbach joined the East German CDU, by now a bloc party beholden to the ruling Socialist Unity Party (SED). He later opined that joining the CDU “gave him peace from the SED", since bloc-party membership functioned as a signal of political reliability in the GDR. In 1974, Reichenbach became the initial CDU district chairman of the rural Karl-Marx-Stadt district association. He was also deputy chairman of the district committee of the National Front.

In June 1988, he was made full-time chairman of the Bezirk Karl-Marx-Stadt CDU district association. In this role, Reichenbach collaborated with the local SED, submitting a written "annual assessment" to the SED security department of the Karl-Marx-Stadt district on security issues within the local CDU, and outlining plans for disasters and war. This report would go on to create political friction later in his career, as he signed it with a "socialist greeting". Although he initially insisted he had only written one iteration of the annual report in 1988, after a 1989 version was obtained by the tabloid Dresdener Morgenpost, Reichenbach confirmed he had signed the 1989 document.

"Unemployment is inevitable, and estimates range from a few hundred thousand people to...a third of the work force. Klaus Reichenbach, a senior East German official, reckons that 15% to 20% of all companies are doomed, and the remainder will certainly have major layoffs."

— TIME Magazine, 1990

By the end of 1988, the SED-run economy was visibly faltering and Reichenbach foresaw disaster. In 1990, he remarked to TIME Magazine that "15% to 20% of all companies [in East Germany] are doomed," later recalling it was evident “things could not go on; we were sliding toward the abyss." During the upheavals of autumn 1989, he aligned himself with the CDU’s “new forces", recounting that he urged long-time party chair Gerald Götting to resign on the executive board. On 3 March 1990, during the Peaceful Revolution, he was elected chairman of the reconstituted Saxon CDU.

=== de Maizière Government ===
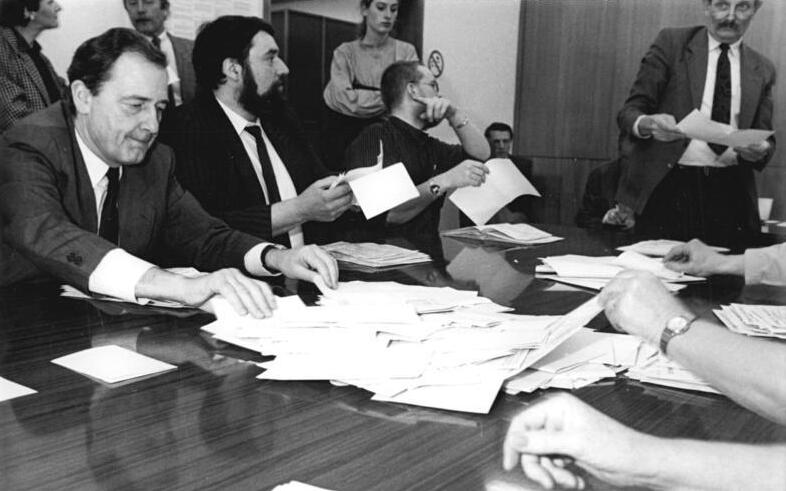
East Germans voting in the first free Volkskammer elections on 18 March 1990. Reichenbach had become chairman of the reconstituted Saxon CDU just two weeks earlier, as the party transformed from a socialist bloc party into a democratic organization during the Peaceful Revolution.

In the first free elections of the GDR, Reichenbach was elected to the Volkskammer in March 1990 for Constituency 8 (Karl-Marx-Stadt) as the top-ranked candidate on the CDU's party list. He was thereafter appointed as Minister in the Office of the Minister-President (a position roughly analogous to a Chief of Staff with the rank of a minister) in the cabinet of Lothar de Maizière, serving from April until October 1990. The new ministry replaced the Secretariat of the GDR Council of Ministers, instead mirroring the structure of West Germany's Federal Chancellery. Reichenbach's ministerial position corresponded to the position of Head of the Federal Chancellery, which was held at that time by Rudolf Seiters. Reichenbach and Seiters met in Bonn on 26 April 1990.

The Office of the Minister-President was responsible for implementing the de Maizière government's transformation and reform policies. Reichenbach led and coordinated the negotiations with West Germany on: (1) the State Treaty, which replaced the East German mark with the Deutsche Mark as East Germany's official currency and (2) the subsequent Unification Treaty, which set the legal framework for the GDR's accession to the Federal Republic on 3 October 1990.

The ministry also supervised the Treuhandanstalt (an agency focused on privatizing VEBs), prepared cabinet meetings, and controlled information flow to the minister-president. It was crucially responsible for coordinating the Reunification of Germany, with the head of the German Unity Task Force, Parliamentary State Secretary, Günther Krause, leading the Unification Treaty negotiations. Reichenbach noted that his role was demanding, with normal days being 16 to 18 hours long. The Office of the Minister-President had a total of 4,500 employees, including its subordinate institutions. He "covered de Maiziére's back" and focused on handling the personnel and the numerous laws being introduced, although he maintained that his "highest goal" was that "German unity must succeed."

=== Bundestag and Resignation ===
Reichenbach was one of Volkskammer members who co-opted to the Bundestag, following Germany's reunification on 3 October 1990. In the first all-German Bundestag election in December 1990, he won the direct mandate in the constituency of Chemnitz. Reichenbach served on the Bundestag's Sports Committee, the European Community Committee, and from 1992, on the Special Committee for the European Union.

He was considered a candidate for the role of Minister-President of Saxony, but he declined, saying his wife wouldn't have approved. Kurt Biedenkopf, briefly chairman of North Rhine-Westphalia CDU in the 80s, instead became the CDU's top candidate for the October 1990 state elections and subsequently Minister-President.

Soon after reunification, the Saxon CDU faced immense internal turmoil and pressure regarding its political future, particularly concerning the influence of former bloc party members, known as "recorders". In 1991, Der Spiegel described the reputation of the Eastern CDU as being "in tatters"; the organization struggled severely, reportedly losing around 1,000 members every month in Saxony alone. The internal conflict was a microcosm of wider social tensions "between the CDU grassroots on the one hand and former CDU leaders on the other." In their efforts to "tackle the legacy of the past", federal CDU leadership, including Chancellor Helmut Kohl and CDU General Secretary Volker Rühe, sought to "break the power of the recorders" and support reformers, such as Arnold Vaatz, the head of the Sächsische Staatskanzlei under Kurt Biedenkopf.

This struggle culminated in the CDU party conference in Görlitz in the fall of 1991, where a "reformist minority" passed a key resolution demanding that "party officials who had once been loyal to the SED were required to resign from office", alongside provisions for the expulsion of Stasi informants. The measure was aimed at "denying new posts to veteran party members" like Reichenbach (who had been on the CDU executive board since 1987). Ultimately, Reichenbach, who was among the state association heads facing replacement, was deeply affected by this atmosphere. Vaatz observed that Reichenbach likely "no longer wanted to be subjected to the pressure" he faced because of his "previous role as district chairman of the CDU in Chemnitz," noting that "the attacks had worn him down considerably."

Amid continuous pressure regarding his past as a high-ranking bloc party politician, Reichenbach resigned as chairman of the Saxon CDU in September 1991. Following his resignation, Minister President Kurt Biedenkopf succeeded him as state chairman of the CDU Saxony. Reichenbach was "soon deeply disappointed" during his time in Bonn, where he found himself a "backbencher". He recalled, "I made many good suggestions," but felt he could "achieve almost nothing". Due to this frustration, Reichenbach left the Bundestag and thus retired from politics completely in 1994. Since 1995, he has worked as a practicing lawyer in Hartmannsdorf.

=== Football administration ===
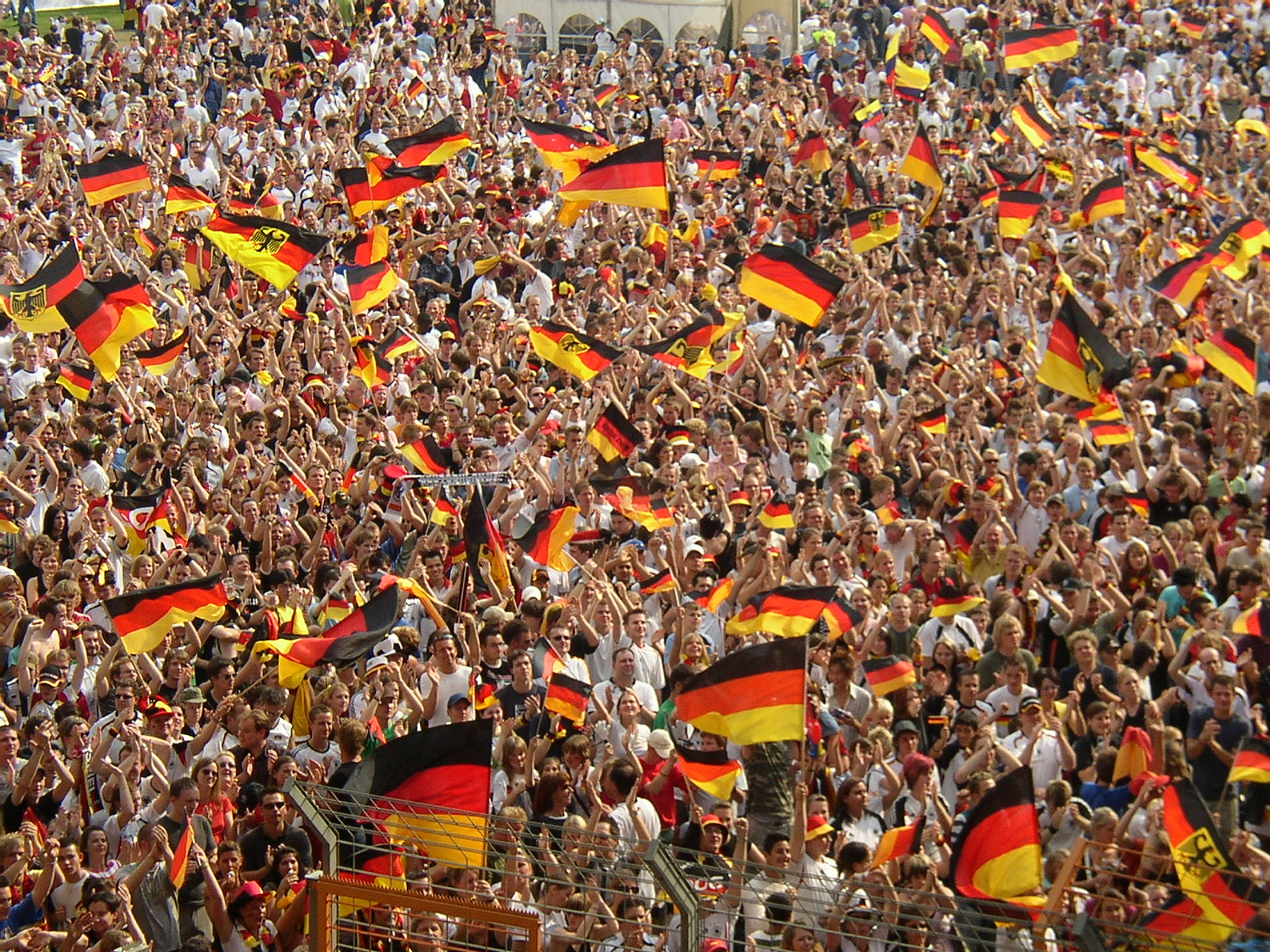
German fans at the Germany-Ecuador match at the Ruhrstadion in Bochum for the FIFA World Cup 2006 in Germany, which Reichenbach helped to organize.

Reichenbach has been consistently active in football administration since 1990. From its founding in 1990 until he stepped down in April 2016, Reichenbach was president of the Saxony Football Association (SFV), and was subsequently named its honorary president. He was also vice-president of the Northeastern German Football Association (NOFV) and from 1997 to 2016, a member of the board of the German Football Association (DFB).

He was heavily involved in organizing major football events, serving as the Head of the Organization Committee for the Leipzig branch office during the 2006 FIFA World Cup, and in the Dresden branch office during the 2011 FIFA Women's World Cup. For his contributions, he received the Silver and Gold Honorary Pins from the DFB, and was later named an Honorary Member. DFB President Reinhard Grindel acknowledged that Reichenbach "has given much to football in eastern Germany for more than a quarter of a century," noting specifically that the "smooth merger of DFB and DFV also bears his signature."

== Personal life ==
Reichenbach is a Protestant, has two children, and multiple grandchildren. He says he has maintained very good ties to his birthplace of Altenburg, since he has a large family connection there. During his 25-year tenure as president of the Saxon Football Association, Reichenbach acknowledged that balancing his demanding role with family life was a concern, joking that his wife would not have been particularly happy had he spent every weekend attending matches rather than with his family. Despite his professional involvement in football, Reichenbach has stated he was never a passionate stadium fan, preferring instead to watch matches on television at home where he could enjoy the games in peace.
