= Herbert Schirmer =

German politician (born 1945)

Minister of Culture
- In office 12 April 1990 – 2 October 1990
- Minister-President: Lothar de Maizière
- Preceded by: Dietmar Keller
- Succeeded by: Position abolished
Parliamentary constituencies
Member of the Volkskammer for Bezirk Frankfurt (Oder)
In office 5 April 1990 – 2 October 1990
Preceded by	Constituency established
Succeeded by	Constituency abolished

Personal details
- Born: Herbert Schirmer; 8 July 1945 (age 81) Stadtlengsfeld, State of Thuringia, Soviet occupation zone, Allied-occupied Germany (now Thuringia, Germany)
- Party: Independent (1998–)
- Other political affiliations: Social Democratic Party (1992–1998); Christian Democratic Union of Germany (1990–1991); Christian Democratic Union (East Germany) (1985–1990)
- Education: Karl Marx University (Dipl.-Journ.)
- Occupation: Politician; Journalist; Artist

Herbert Schirmer (born 8 July 1945) is a former German politician of the Christian Democratic Union (CDU).

He served as the GDR's last Minister of Culture in the cabinet of Lothar de Maizière.

== Life and career ==
=== Early career ===
Schirmer completed an apprenticeship as a machinist and stoker in 1966. He then underwent vocational training as a bookseller. He worked in this profession in Dresden in 1974/75. Between 1976 and 1978, he worked as an employee in the Bezirk Dresden Cabinet for Cultural Affairs and, from 1977, served as the editor-in-chief of the Kultur-Report Dresden.

After completing a distance learning program in journalism at the Karl Marx University's Journalism Section, nicknamed "Red Monastery" due to the strict ideological control of the SED, he worked as the department head for public relations and international exhibitions at the publishing house Verlag der Kunst until 1986. In addition, Schirmer worked as a freelance art and theater critic.

In 1989, before the collapse of the GDR, he switched to the State Art Collection in Cottbus, where he worked as a scientific associate in the Department of Fine Arts.

=== Peaceful Revolution ===
Although he had been a member of the East German Christian Democratic Union (CDU), a bloc party beholden to the ruling Socialist Unity Party (SED), since 1985, Schirmer only became politically active during the Peaceful Revolution. He co-founded the oppositional group Neues Forum in Beeskow and became its spokesperson.

In November 1989, he was elected to succeed SED-loyal Werner Zachow as full-time chairman of the Bezirk Frankfurt (Oder) CDU. He held this position until being elected to chair the reconstituted Brandenburg CDU in March 1990.

In the first free elections in the GDR, Schirmer was elected to the Volkskammer in March 1990 for Bezirk Frankfurt (Oder), being the first-placed candidate on the CDU list.

=== de Maizière Government ===
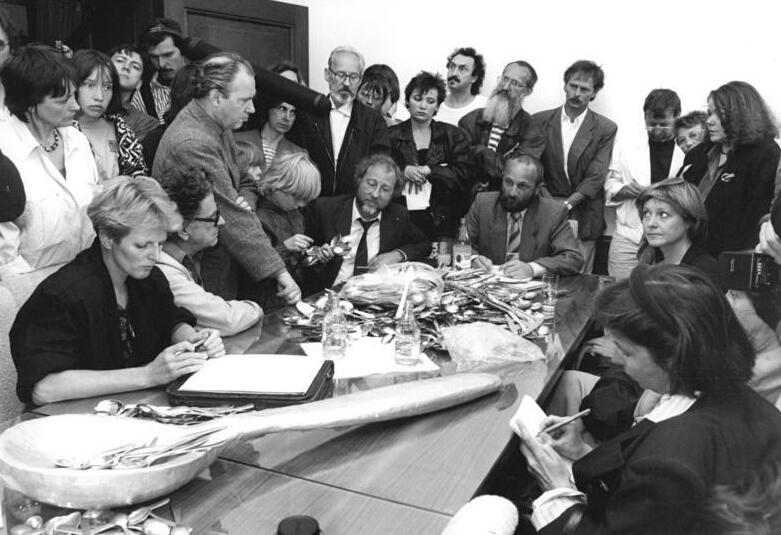
Schirmer (end of the table) meeting artists "handing in the spoon" (German idiom referring to dying) in July 1990

After the election, he was appointed Minister of Culture in the cabinet of Lothar de Maizière, serving from April until October 1990.

As Minister of Culture, Schirmer focused on democratizing and decentralizing cultural policy, previously tightly controlled by the SED.

He worked to dismantle old structures and replace them with public bodies, recognizing that post-reunification, cultural matters would be managed by the states. This restructuring controversially involved reducing state subsidies and reorganizing fees for cultural services.

Schirmer also aimed to preserve East German cultural achievements, which were often dismissed as politically motivated due to the legacy of the SED's paternalism. Through tough negotiations, he sought to protect institutions, especially in the field of high culture, while ensuring the continued existence of cultural infrastructure.

=== Reunified Germany ===
After German reunification, Schirmer retired from politics, having already stepped down as chairman of the Brandenburg CDU in August 1990, and returned to the arts and cultural sector. After leaving the CDU in February 1991, Schirmer joined the SPD in June 1992, serving as a member of their national cultural forum. He left the SPD in November 1998, shortly after Gerhard Schröder became Chancellor.

From May 1991 to 1998, he was the director of the museum at Wasserburg Beeskow, where he established the Collection and Documentation Center Art of the GDR. Afterward, he worked for Inpetho Medienproduktion GmbH in Cottbus.

He now lives as a journalist in Lieberose and is the chairman of the Board of Trustees of the Stiftung Neue Kultur.
