= Gottfried Haschke =

East German politician (1935–2018)

East German Minister of Food and Agriculture
- In office 20 August 1990 – 2 October 1990
- Prime Minister: Lothar de Maizière
- Preceded by: Peter Kauffold
- Succeeded by: Position abolished
- Parliamentary group: CDU

Personal details
- Born: 25 March 1935 Großhennersdorf, Germany
- Died: 2 December 2018 (aged 83)
- Occupation: Politician

Gottfried Haschke (25 March 1935 – 2 December 2018) was an East German politician. He served as the last East German Minister of Food and Agriculture in the de Maizière cabinet during 1990.
