= Ministry for Foreign Affairs (East Germany) =

- Ministerium für Auswärtige Angelegenheiten der DDR
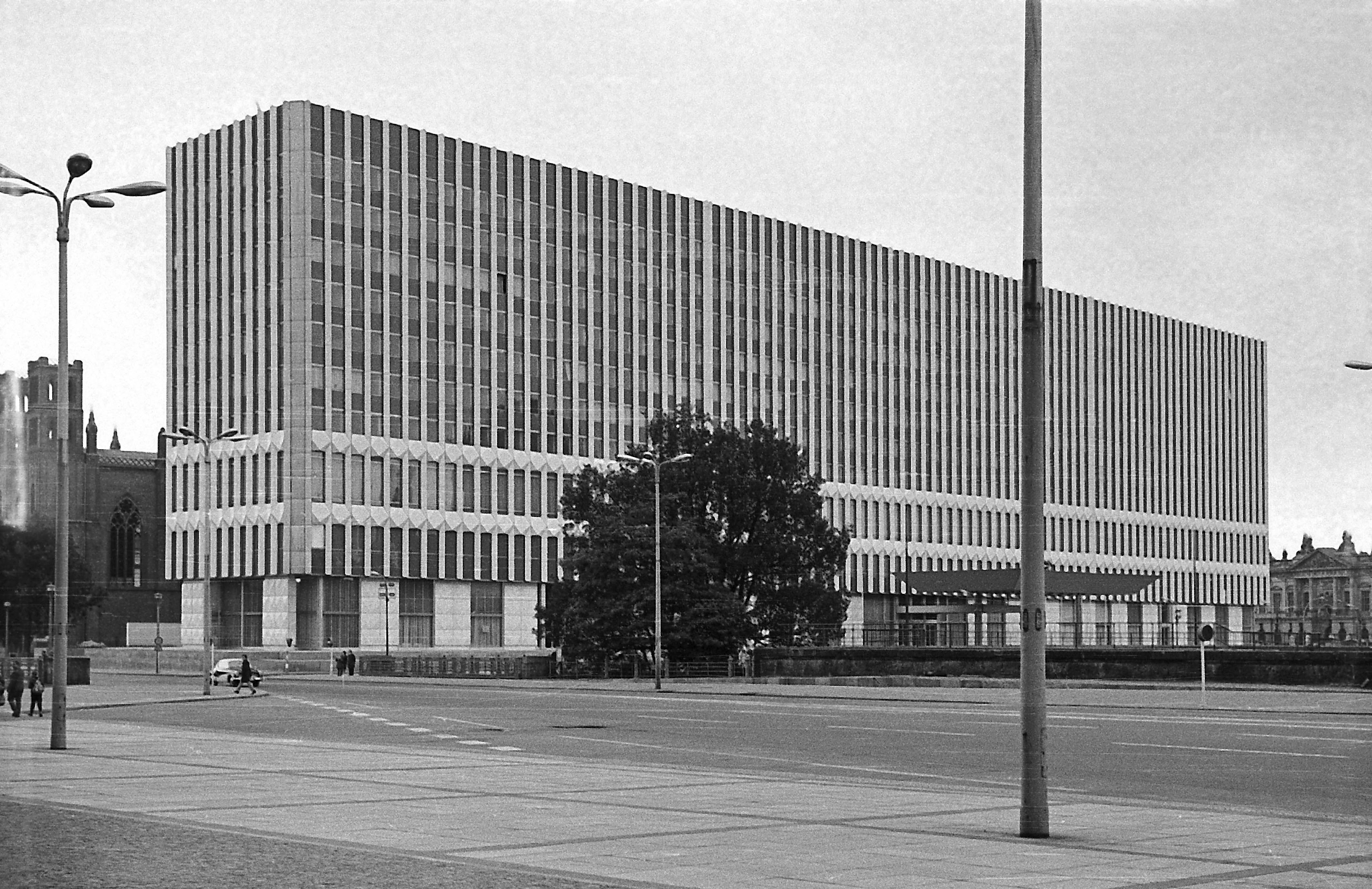
- The Ministry for Foreign Affairs of the German Democratic Republic, 1969. The building was demolished in 1996, after German reunification.

Agency overview
- Formed: 1949
- Dissolved: 1990
- Jurisdiction: Government of East Germany
- Headquarters: East Berlin; 52°30′58″N 13°23′53″E

The Ministry for Foreign Affairs of the German Democratic Republic (German: Ministerium für Auswärtige Angelegenheiten der Deutschen Demokratischen Republik, abbreviated MfAA) was a government body of the German Democratic Republic (East Germany) that existed from 1949 to 1990. It had its seat at Schinkelplatz in Berlin-Mitte. A new building was constructed in 1964–1967 and used by the foreign ministry, but demolished in 1996 after German reunification.

The Ministry for Foreign Affairs was led by the Foreign Minister of the German Democratic Republic and a number of deputies. However, the Foreign Minister had less actual influence over the foreign policy than the central committee secretary for foreign policy in the Socialist Unity Party of Germany. As a de facto subordinate position, the Foreign Minister could be a member of some of the block parties in East Germany.

The West German counterpart to the Ministry was the Federal Foreign Office. The office still serves as the current German foreign ministry, considering itself to be the direct continuation of the Foreign Office of the North German Confederation, established in 1870.

== Foreign Ministers of the German Democratic Republic from 1949 to 1991 ==
The foreign ministry of the German Democratic Republic was responsible for foreign relations, the conclusion of international treaties, and the management of the diplomatic service. It was represented by the Minister of Foreign Affairs, as well as representatives of ministers and state secretaries. However, the Foreign Minister was subordinate to the Secretary for Foreign Relations in the Socialist Unity Party of Germany, a role in which Hermann Axen served between 1966 and 1989.

== List of officeholders ==
Ministers of Foreign Affairs
#	Name	Lived	Photo	Entered office	Left Office	Party	Days in office
1	Georg Dertinger	(1902–1968)		12 October 1949	15 January 1953	CDU	1192
2	Anton Ackermann	(1905–1973)		15 January 1953	1 October 1953	SED	260
3	Lothar Bolz	(1903–1986)		1 October 1953	24 June 1965	NDPD	4285
4	Otto Winzer	(1902–1975)		24 June 1965	20 January 1975	SED	≈ 3480
5	Oskar Fischer	(1923–2020)		3 March 1975	12 April 1990	SED	5520
6	Markus Meckel	(* 1952)		12 April 1990	20 August 1990	SPD	131
7	Lothar de Maizière	(* 1940)		20 August 1990	2 October 1990	CDU	44

== Literature ==
- Hermann Wentker: Außenpolitik in engen Grenzen. Die DDR im internationalen System (= Schriftenreihe der Vierteljahrshefte für Zeitgeschichte). Oldenbourg Wissenschaftsverlag, München 2007. ISBN 978-3-486-58345-8.
- Ministry of Foreign Affairs of the GDR: A New Beginning with Big Plans. In: Sites of Unity (Haus der Geschichte), 2022.
