= Wengelsdorf =

- Stadtteil of Weißenfels
- Interactive map of Wengelsdorf
- Location within Germany Location within Saxony-Anhalt
- Coordinates: 51°16′56″N 12°2′25″E
- Country: Germany
- State: Saxony-Anhalt
- District: Burgenlandkreis
- Town: Weißenfels

Government
  - Mayor: Sybille Reider

Area
  - Total: 5.89 km^{2} (2.27 sq mi)
- Elevation: 94 m (308 ft)

Population (2017)
  - Total: 873
  - Density: 148/km^{2} (384/sq mi)
- Time zone: UTC+01:00 (CET)
  - Summer (DST): UTC+02:00 (CEST)
- Postal codes: 06688
- Dialling codes: 034446
- Vehicle registration: BLK

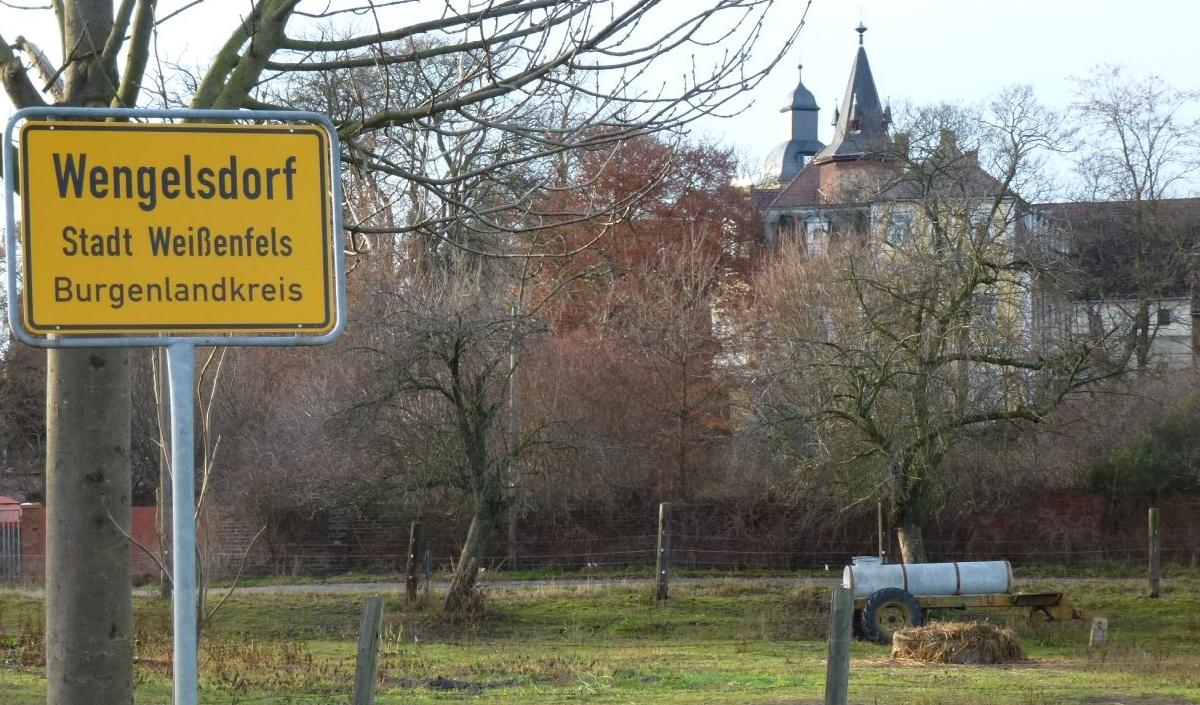
Town as seen on approach from Bad Duerrenberg side

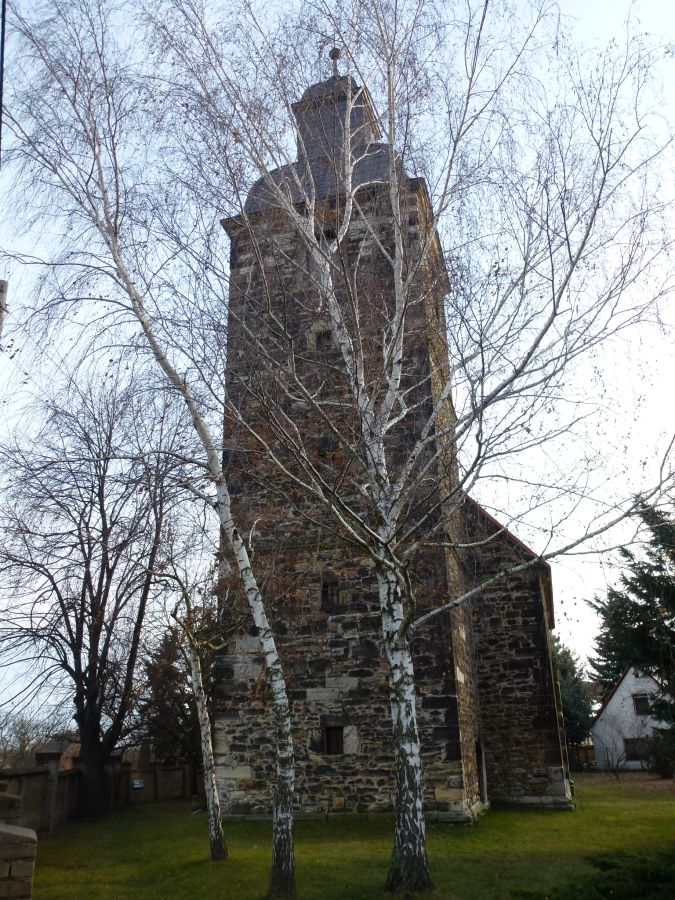
Church

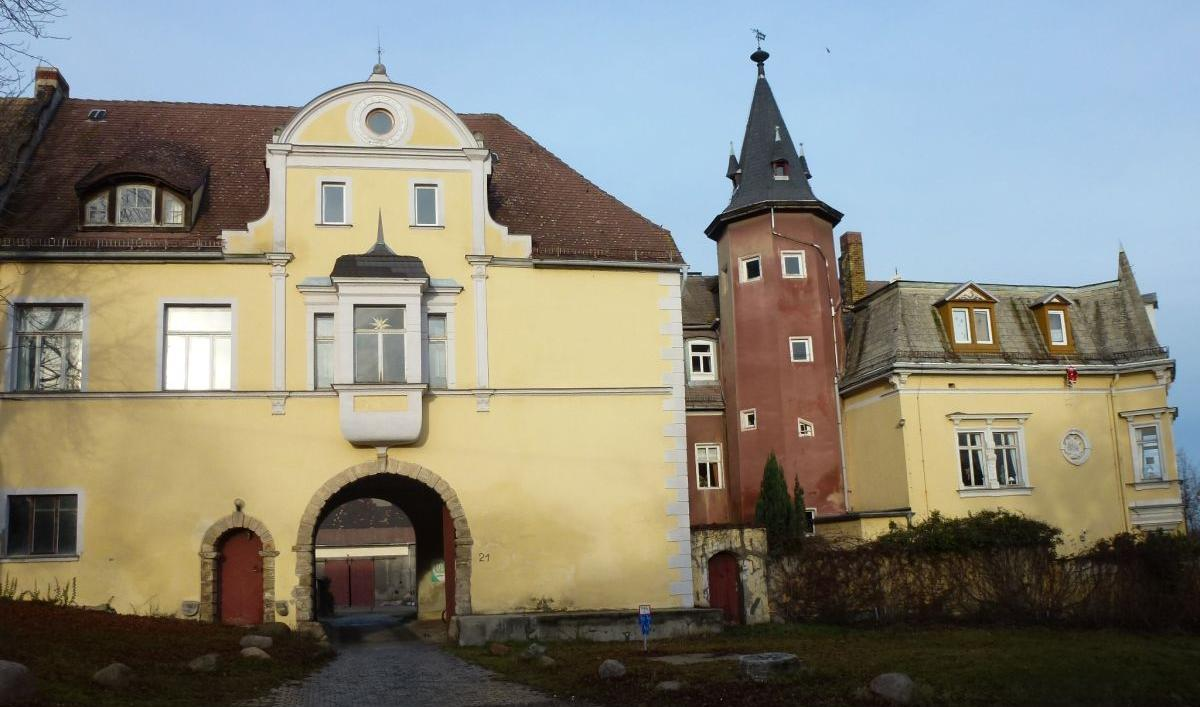
Wengelsdorf Manor

Wengelsdorf is a village and a former municipality in the Burgenlandkreis district, in Saxony-Anhalt, Germany. Since 1 September 2010, it has been part of the town Weißenfels.

== Historical Population ==
(From 1995 as of 31 December):

Year	Population
1990	945 *
1995	910
2000	936
2005	917

* 3 October
