= Peter Moreth =

German politician (1941–2014)

President of the Treuhandanstalt
- In office 1 March 1990 – 15 June 1990
- Appointed by: Hans Modrow
- Deputy: Wolfram Krause
- Preceded by: Position established
- Succeeded by: Wolfram Krause (interim)

Deputy Chairman of the Council of Ministers of East Germany Minister for Local Government Bodies
- In office 18 November 1989 – 12 April 1990 Serving with Christa Luft, Lothar de Maizière
- Chairman of the Council of Ministers: Hans Modrow
- Preceded by: Position established
- Succeeded by: Manfred Preiß (Regional and local affairs); Peter-Michael Diestel (Deputy Minister-President)

Member of the Volkskammer for Magdeburg
- In office 8 June 1986 – 5 April 1990
- Preceded by: multi-member district
- Succeeded by: Constituency abolished

Personal details
- Born: Peter Moreth; 28 July 1941 Chemnitz, Nazi Germany (now Germany)
- Died: 2 April 2014 (aged 72) Berlin
- Party: Independent
- Other political affiliations: Liberal Democratic Party (1962–1990)
- Education: Karl Marx University
- Occupation: Politician; Business Consultant; Retailer; Mason

Peter Moreth (28 July 1941 – 4 February 2014) was a German politician of the East German satellite party LDPD. He was a member of the Volkskammer from 1986 to March 1990 and member of the State Council of East Germany from 1986 to November 1989. During the Peaceful Revolution he was a Deputy Chairman of the East German Council of Ministers from November 1989 to March 1990, overseeing local government. During the transition towards German reunification he was briefly the first president of the Treuhand, the organisation entrusted with the privatisation of East Germany's nationally-owned enterprises.

== Life ==
Moreth was born in Chemnitz on 28 July 1941, during the Second World War. His father was shopkeeper. After leaving school he served an apprenticeship as a bricklayer between 1955 and 1957, followed by another apprenticeship in retailing from 1957 till 1959. He then worked in the retail sector from 1959 to 1968. He completed a correspondence course of business administration at the University of Leipzig from 1968 to 1973 and received his doctorate in economy from the same university in 1977.

In 1962 Moreth joined the East German Liberal Democratic Party (LDPD), one of the country's so-called bloc parties controlled through the National Front organisation and subordinate to the ruling Socialist Unity Party (SED). In 1964 he became chairman of the National Front's local branch in the central Saxon town of Mittweida. In 1968 he became a full-time employee of the regional party organisation of the LDPD in the district of Karl-Marx-Stadt (as Chemnitz was called at that time). In 1970 he became a deputy chairman of the city council of Karl-Marx-Stadt with responsibility for trade and supply. Then from 1971 till 1983 he was the LDPD district chairman and a member of the district council of Cottbus. He became a candidate for the central committee of the LDPD in 1967, a full member of the central committee in 1972 and a member of the party's political bureau in 1977. From 1983 till 20 November 1989 he served as chairman of the LDPD's regional association in the district of Magdeburg. In 1986 he was selected to the Volkskammer, the parliament of East Germany. Between 16 June 1986 and 17 November 1989 he served as a member of the East German State Council, the collective head of state.

Under the short-lived premiership of Hans Modrow during the Peaceful Revolution, Moreth was appointed deputy chairman of the Council of ministers and minister of local administration on 19 November 1989, serving until the first and only free East German parliament election on 18 March 1990. Shortly before the election, on 1 March 1990, prime minister Hans Modrow appointed him as the first president of the Treuhand agency that was tasked with privatisation of the Volkseigene Betriebe (publicly owned enterprises). After proposing voucher privatisation by handing out shares to the citizens of East Germany, he fell out of favour with the new democratic government of Lothar de Maizière that planned to sell the enterprises to investors. The prime minister believed Moreth's thinking was "firmly within a socialist economic system" and dismissed him on 15 June 1990.

After this Peter Moreth lived as a business consultant in Berlin where, in February 2014, he died.

== Award ==
- 1981 Patriotic Order of Merit Silver
