= Walter Romberg =

German politician (1928–2014)

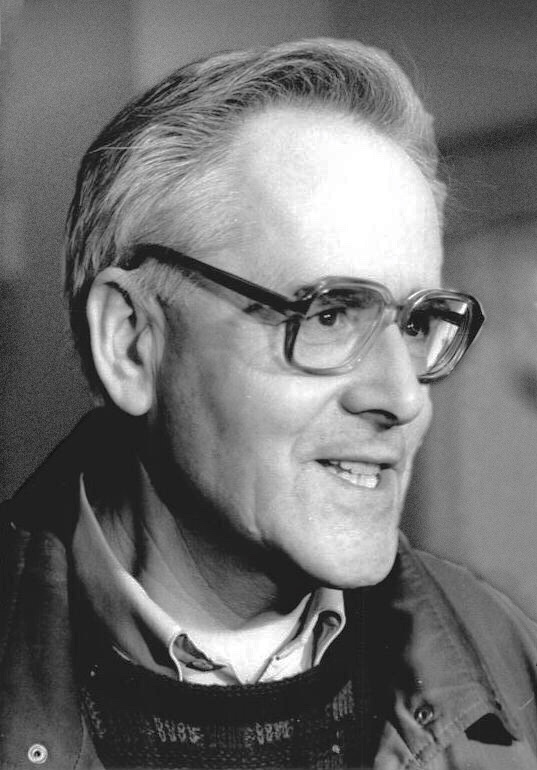
- Romberg in 1990

Minister of Finance
- In office 12 April 1990 – 16 August 1990
- Minister-President: Lothar de Maizière
- Preceded by: Walter Siegert (acting)
- Succeeded by: Werner Skowron (acting)

Minister without Portfolio
- In office 5 February 1990 – 12 April 1990
- Chairman of the Council of Ministers: Hans Modrow
- Preceded by: Office established
- Succeeded by: Office abolished

Personal details
- Born: 27 December 1928 Schwerin, Free State of Mecklenburg-Schwerin, Weimar Republic
- Died: 23 May 2014 (aged 85) Teltow, Brandenburg, Germany
- Resting place: Schwerin, Germany
- Party: Social Democratic Party (1990–2014)
- Other political affiliations: Social Democratic Party in the GDR (1989–1990)

Walter Romberg (27 December 1928 – 23 May 2014) was a German politician and finance minister of East Germany.

== Early life and education ==
Romberg was born in Schwerin on 27 December 1928. From 1947, he studied physics and mathematics. He held a Dr. rer. nat. in mathematics.

== Career ==
He worked at the East German Academy of Sciences. He was editor-in-chief of the Zentralblatt MATH from 1965 to 1978.

Romberg became a member of the Social Democratic Party (SPD) in 1989. He served as the minister without portfolio in the cabinet of Prime Minister Hans Modrow between 1989 and 1990. Romberg was appointed minister of finance to the cabinet led by Prime Minister Lothar de Maizière on 12 April 1990 following the first free elections of East Germany on 18 March 1990. Romberg was one of the senior social democratic members of de Maizière's cabinet. On 19 May 1990, the West Germany's finance minister, Theo Waigel, and Romberg signed a state treaty to merge their economies and make the West German mark the sole legal currency in both nations by 2 July 1990.

Romberg was removed from office on 15 August 1990 due to his support for the challenging clauses in a political unification treaty governing the allocation of tax revenues. He also angered the West German officials with his continuous demands for more cash help to bail out the weak East German industries and to finance welfare payments. The other reason for his removal was related to the East Germany's rapidly deteriorating economic status. Romberg was also fired due to his warnings about the reunification in terms of its economic burden and his critical and even pessimistic approach towards it.

Werner Skowron succeeded Romberg in the post. Following the dismissal of Romberg, SPD left the coalition on 20 August 1990, and called it unconstitutional. Until 1994 Romberg served at the European Parliament.

=== Views ===
In 1991, after unification, Romberg stated in a conference held at Humboldt University that the West German leadership did not comprehend the huge differences between two countries' economic patterns.

== Later years and personal life ==
Romberg was married and had three sons. In 1997, he moved to Teltow with his wife. He died there on 23 May 2014 and was buried in his hometown Schwerin.
