= Klaus Thielmann =

East German physician and politician (1933–2024)

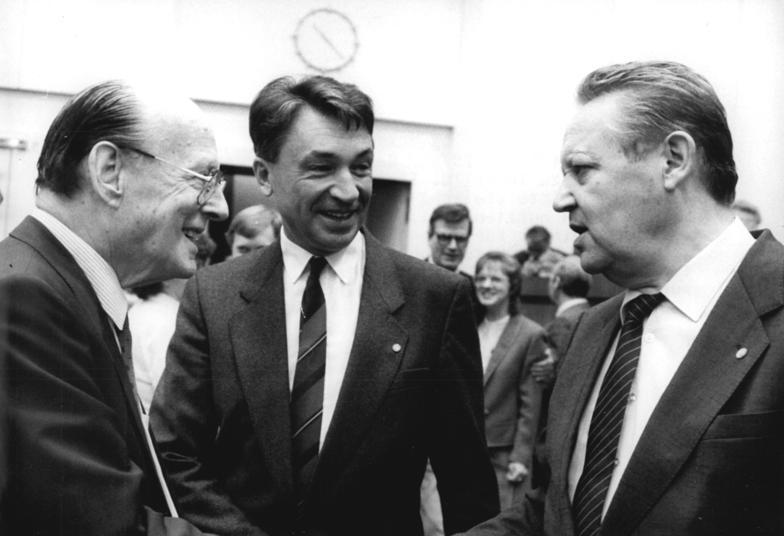
- Thielmann (centre) in 1989

Minister of Health and Social Affairs (Note: Minister of Health from January 1989 to November 1989)
- In office 27 January 1989 – 12 April 1990
- Chairman of the Council of Ministers: Willi Stoph; Hans Modrow
- First Deputy: Ulrich Schneidewind; Horst Schönfelder
- Preceded by: Ludwig Mecklinger
- Succeeded by: Jürgen Kleditzsch (Health); Regine Hildebrandt (Labor and Social Affairs)

Personal details
- Born: Klaus Thielmann; 29 October 1933 Pulsnitz, Free State of Saxony, Nazi Germany (now Germany)
- Died: 25 January 2024 (aged 90) Radibor, Free State of Saxony, Germany
- Party: Socialist Unity Party (1978–1989)
- Education: Sorbian Gymnasium Bautzen
- Alma mater: Karl Marx University; Medizinische Akademie Erfurt (Dr. med.)
- Occupation: Politician; Civil Servant; Academic; Physician

Klaus Thielmann (29 October 1933 – 25 January 2024) was an East German physician, civil servant and politician of the Socialist Unity Party (SED).

He served as East Germany's penultimate Health Minister, being appointed on the eve of and serving during the Peaceful Revolution. Thielmann was of Sorbian descent and the only Sorb to ever hold a ministerial position in East Germany and, to date, Germany on a national level.

== Life and career ==
=== Early career ===
Thielmann grew up as the son of a family of physicians and graduated from the Sorbian High School in Bautzen, and studied medicine from 1952 to 1957 at the Karl Marx University in Leipzig and the Medical Academy in Erfurt.

In 1957, he earned his doctorate in medicine (Dr. med.), worked for one year as an assistant doctor at the district hospital in Stralsund, and from 1958 to 1959, served as a ship's doctor for the Deutsche Seereederei (DSR).

=== Academic career ===
From 1959 to 1963, Thielmann worked as a scientific assistant at the Institutes of Physiological Chemistry at the universities of Greifswald and Jena. At Friedrich Schiller University Jena, he was appointed senior physician in 1963 and became a university lecturer after his habilitation in 1965. From 1968 to 1971, Thielmann was a guest professor at the Centro Nacional de Investigaciones Científicas (CNIC) in Havana.

In 1974, he was appointed a full professor at the Medical Academy in Erfurt and served as prorector for Natural Sciences and Medical Research there from 1976 to 1982. Thielmann joined the ruling Socialist Unity Party of Germany (SED) in 1978.

In 1982, he left academia when he was appointed deputy minister in the Ministry of Higher and Technical Education.

=== Health minister ===
On 27 January 1989, he was made minister of health. With this, Thielmann was the only Sorb to ever hold a ministerial position in East Germany and Germany as a whole.

He succeeded fellow physician Ludwig Mecklinger, who officially retired "at his own request", but was actually fired and replaced by Thielmann on the instigation of Karl Seidel, head of the Central Committee Health Policy Department. Mecklinger had already fallen out of favor with Erich Honecker for calling the death of his beloved two-year-old granddaughter Mariana in January 1988 "tragic and unavoidable".

At the start of Thielmann's tenure, the East German health care system had been crumbling for several years, many hospitals being in a state of disrepair and suffering from outdated technical equipment, high workloads on medical and nursing staff and severe labor and material shortages. These problems were exacerbated by the wave of refugees in the summer of 1989. Thielmann encouraged open discussion, holding the first East German National Health Conference in September 1989.

During the Peaceful Revolution, Thielmann was one of only a few ministers kept by the new transitional government of Hans Modrow, additionally taking on the responsibility for social affairs.

After the fall of the Berlin Wall, Thielmann requested help from West Germany in late 1989, directly writing to Chancellor Helmut Kohl. In cooperation with the German Red Cross and the Federal Government, an emergency aid programme was initiated in February 1990, which saw the Federal Government providing East Germany with 500 million DM for the purchase of medicines, highly specialised medical technology, medical consumables and rehabilitation technology. Thielmann additionally deployed 2,000 National People's Army members in the health sector in every Bezirk from December 1989. At the same time, his decision-making was increasingly hampered by having to consult with the round table for his office.

His ministerial career ended in April 1990 after the first free elections in East Germany, when Jürgen Kleditzsch was appointed as his successor. After leaving office, Thielmann expressed shame for the SED's failures, accusing them of having abused the public's trust.

=== Reunified Germany ===
After the reunification of Germany, he was employed as a full professor at the Institute of Pathology of the Medical Faculty (Charité) of Humboldt University in Berlin until October 1991.

From 1992 to 1994, Thielmann worked as a management consultant at the International Finance and Banking School in Moscow on behalf of the European Bank for Reconstruction and Development, and from 1994 to 1997, he was on a similar mission at the Regional Bank Training Center for the Central Asian region (Uzbekistan, Kyrgyzstan and Tajikistan) in Tashkent. From 1998 to 2001, Thielmann led an EU project in Moscow to support the management and leadership of the Russian healthcare system (EU/TACIS: ‘Support to Health Care Management in the Russian Federation’). Afterwards until 2004, Thielmann was involved in the implementation of several international projects aimed at reforming the Russian healthcare system. Concurrently and thereafter, Thielmann dedicated himself to his extensive publication and lecture activities.

Thielmann died on 25 January 2024 at the age of 90.
