= Otto Winzer =

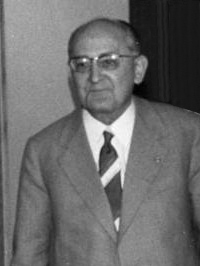
- Winzer in 1972

Minister for Foreign Affairs
- In office 29 June 1965 – 20 January 1975
- Chairman of the Council of Ministers: Willi Stoph; Horst Sindermann
- First Deputy: Ernst Scholz
- Preceded by: Lothar Bolz
- Succeeded by: Oskar Fischer

Personal details
- Born: 3 April 1902 Berlin, Kingdom of Prussia, German Empire
- Died: 3 March 1975 (aged 72) East Berlin, German Democratic Republic
- Party: Socialist Unity Party of Germany (SED)
- Profession: Typesetter

Otto Winzer (3 April 1902 – 3 March 1975) was an East German diplomat who served as East Germany's Minister of Foreign Affairs from 1965 to 1975.

== Biography ==
Winzer was born in Berlin in 1902. He was a son of worker. Otto Winzer learned the typesetter craft.

In 1919, he became a member of the Communist Party of Germany. Then he became the head of Communist Youth publication. He was involved in underground activities against Adolf Hitler's regime from 1933 to 1935. In 1935, Winzer went to the Soviet Union, and he stayed there until the end of World War II. During World War II, he used the code name Lorenz. He returned from exile in the Soviet Union as part of the Ulbricht Group, charged with setting up the Soviet Military Administration in Germany after World War II in April 1945.

Winzer joined the Socialist Unity Party, the East German communist party, in 1946, and he became a member of its central committee in 1946. He was named the deputy editor of the party's official paper Neues Deutschland in 1949. Winzer was Secretary of State from 1949 to 1956 and First Deputy Minister of Foreign Affairs from 1956 to 1965. He served as Minister of Foreign Affairs from 1965 to 1975. He was removed from his post due to ill health and died at age 72 on 3 March 1975.

== Awards and decorations ==
- Patriotic Order of Merit (1955 and 1972)
- Order of Karl Marx (1962)
- Grand Star of People's Friendship (1975)
- Otto-Winzer-Straße in Berlin-Marzahn (1978–1992, now Mehrower Allee)
- Officer College of the National People's Army, for foreign military cadres, in Prora on Rügen was named after him (1981–1990)
- The international school of the East German Ministry of Foreign Affairs, in Königs Wusterhausen bore his name
