= Markus Meckel =

German theologian and politician

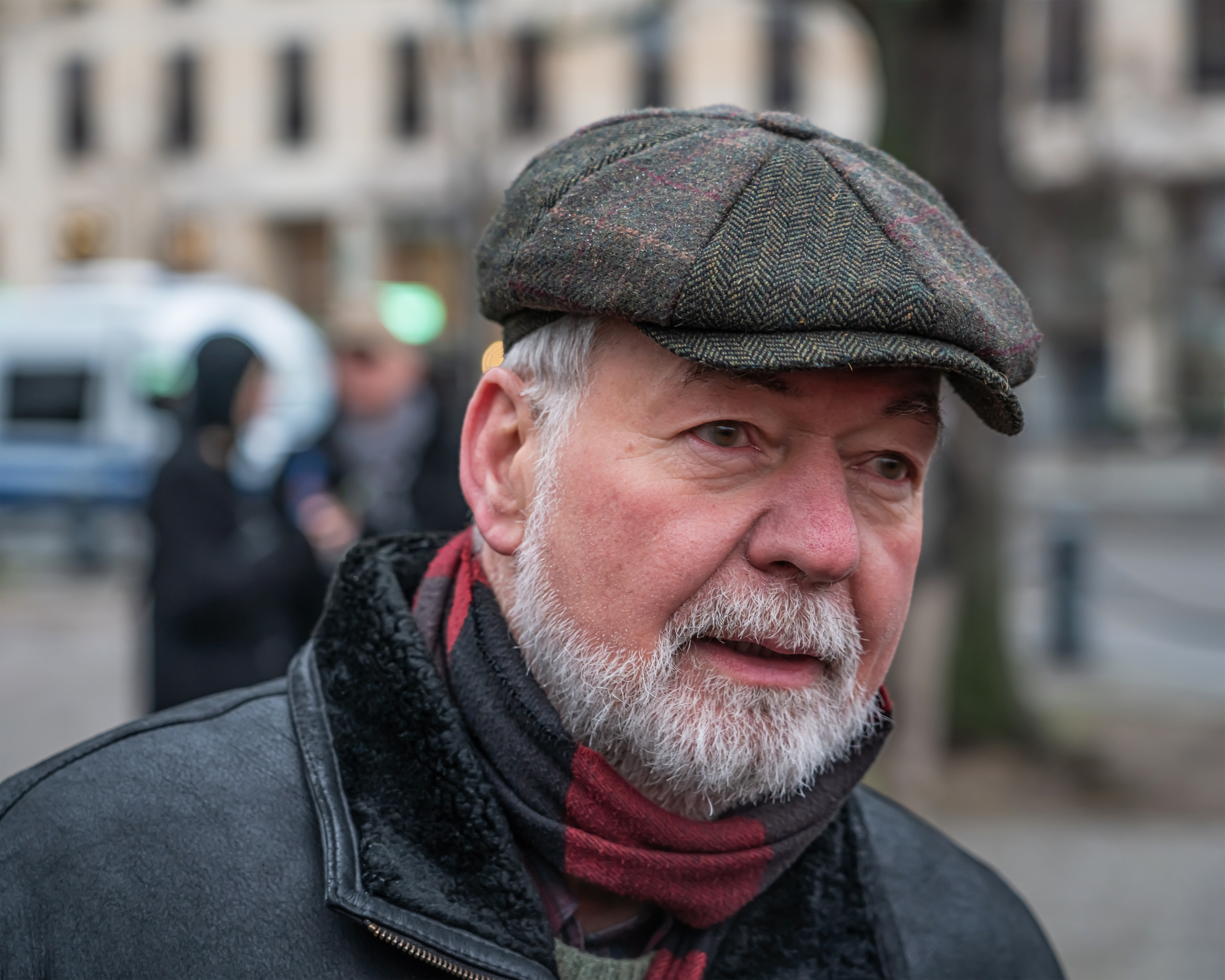
- Meckel in 2023

Minister for Foreign Affairs
- In office 12 April 1990 – 20 August 1990
- Minister-President: Lothar de Maizière
- Preceded by: Oskar Fischer
- Succeeded by: Lothar de Maizière (acting)

Acting Leader of the Social Democratic Party in the GDR
- In office 26 March 1990 – 9 June 1990
- Preceded by: Ibrahim Böhme
- Succeeded by: Wolfgang Thierse

Member of the Bundestag
- In office 20 December 1990 – 27 October 2009
- Preceded by: Constituency established
- Succeeded by: Sabine Stüber
- Constituency: Prenzlau – Angermünde – Schwedt – Templin – Gransee (1990–2002); Uckermark – Barnim I (2002–2009)

Member of the Volkskammer for Magdeburg
- In office 5 April 1990 – 2 October 1990
- Preceded by: Constituency established
- Succeeded by: Constituency abolished

Personal details
- Born: Johannes Markus Meckel; 18 August 1952 (age 74) Müncheberg, East Germany
- Party: Social Democratic (since 1990)
- Other political affiliations: SDP in the GDR (1989–1990)
- Children: 6
- Education: Katechetisches Oberseminar Naumburg (Saale)
- Occupation: Politician; Theologian

Markus Meckel (born 18 August 1952) is a German theologian and politician. He was the penultimate foreign minister of the GDR and a member of the German Bundestag.

== Early life ==
Markus Meckel was born on 18 August 1952 in Müncheberg, Brandenburg. He had to leave high school in 1969 for political reasons. From 1969 to 1971, he studied at Kirchenoberseminar Hermannswerder, a boarding school operated by the church whose diploma allowed its students to study theology or sacred music only. From 1971 to 1978, Meckel studied theology in Naumburg and Berlin.

== Political career ==
Meckel had already been involved with domestic opposition to the East German Communist regime since the 1970s. In October 1989, he initiated the establishment of the Social Democratic Party in the GDR (SDP) together with Martin Gutzeit. From 23 February 1990 up to the merger with the West German SPD on 27 September 1990, he was deputy SDP party chairman. After the resignation of Ibrahim Böhme, he was acting chairman from 26 March to 10 June 1990.

In the GDR's first free elections in March 1990, Meckel was elected to Parliament. On 12 April 1990, he became the Minister of Foreign Affairs in the government of Prime Minister Lothar de Maizière (CDU). In his term of office, he frequently worked with Hans Dietrich Genscher, as he was one of the representatives of the two German states during the Two Plus Four Negotiations with the victors of the Second World War over a Final Peace Treaty. It was this treaty which paved the way to the reunification of Germany.

On 20 August 1990, Meckel, together with the Social Democratic ministers, withdrew from the cabinet. The Ministry of Foreign Affairs was taken over by de Maizière himself.

After Germany was reunified on 3 October 1990, Meckel became a member of German Bundestag. From 1992 to 1994 he was spokesperson of the SPD parliamentary group in the historical commission on the aftermath of the SED dictatorship in Germany. From 1994 onwards, he served as one of the spokespeople for the SPD's delegation in a related group dealing with the effects of the East German dictatorship on the German process of reunification.

In the Bundestag, Meckel focuses on European politics and German-Polish relations. Furthermore, since 1994 he is the chairman of the German-Polish Parliamentary Group. Since 1998 he is director/conductor of the German parliamentary delegation to NATO. From November 2000 until November 2002, he was vice-president of the parliamentary assembly of NATO.

Meckel is an advisory chairman of the Foundation for the Processing of the SED Dictatorship and besides member of the adviser of the Federal Authority for the Processing of GDR State Intelligence Files/BStU.

== Other activities ==
- Walther Rathenau Institute, Member of the Advisory Board
- Global Panel Foundation, Member of the Board of Directors

== Personal life ==
Markus Meckel was married twice and has six children. He is involved with the charitable work of the Protestant Church.

== Awards and honours ==
Markus Meckel has received several awards and honors in his life.

- 1995 Order of Merit (First Class), Federal Republic of Germany
- 1998 Cavalier's Cross, Poland
- 2002 Prince Gediminas Award, Lithuania
- 2003 Viadrina Prize, Federal Republic of Germany
- 2004 Cross of the Terra Mariana, Republic of Estonia
- 2005 Three-Star Medal, Republic of Latvia
- 2020 The 20th Hanno R. Ellenbogen Citizenship Award along with Hans-Dietrich Genscher, Ivan Havel and Ivan Chvatik commemorating the 30th Anniversary of the Fall of the Iron Curtain (jointly awarded by the Prague Society and Global Panel Foundation)
