= Oskar Fischer (politician) =

East German politician (1923–2020)

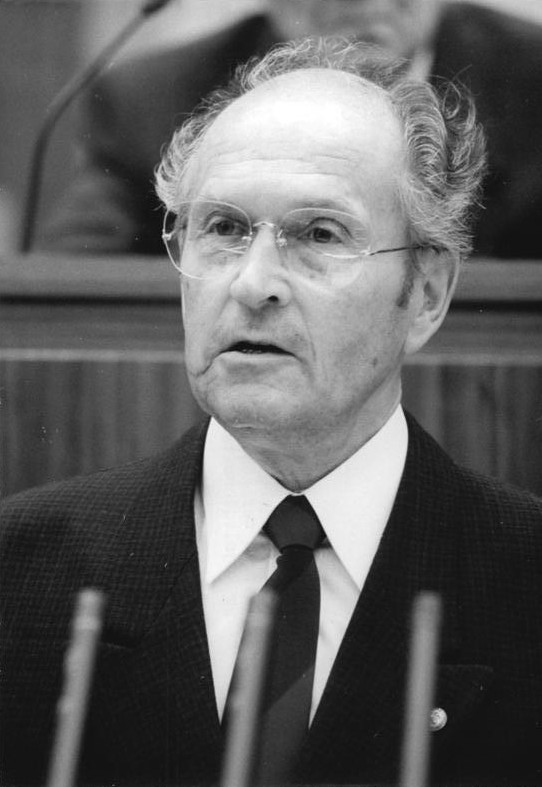

Minister of Foreign Affairs of the German Democratic Republic
- In office 3 March 1975 – 12 April 1990
- Prime Minister: Horst Sindermann; Willi Stoph; Hans Modrow
- Preceded by: Otto Winzer
- Succeeded by: Markus Meckel

Personal details
- Born: 19 March 1923 Aš, Czechoslovak Republic
- Died: 2 April 2020 (aged 97) Berlin, Germany
- Party: Socialist Unity Party of Germany

Oskar Fischer (19 March 1923 – 2 April 2020) was a German politician of the ruling Socialist Unity Party (SED) who served as minister of foreign affairs of the German Democratic Republic from 1975 to 1990. He previously worked in the secretariat of the central committee of the communist party, and became a member of the SED central committee in 1971.

== Early life ==
Fischer was born in 1923. He joined the German army and fought in World War II as a soldier. He was arrested and detained by the Soviets for two years in 1944.

== Career ==
Following his release Fischer joined the communist youth organization Free German Youth in East Germany and studied social sciences in Moscow. He served as East Germany's ambassador to Bulgaria for four years between 1955 and 1959. He was deputy minister of foreign affairs from 1965 to 1975. He was named as a member of the Central Committee of the Socialist Unity Party in 1971. He was appointed as minister of foreign affairs on 3 March 1975. Fischer replaced Otto Winzer in the post, who had been removed from office due to ill health.

Fischer was the first member of the East German cabinet to visit Pope John Paul II at the Vatican in 1978. In September 1980 he signed a treaty of cooperation with the Palestine Liberation Organization in East Berlin. Fischer also officially visited a number of European states, including Austria, Denmark and the Netherlands. Fischer's tenure lasted until 12 April 1990, and he was succeeded by Markus Meckel in the post.

== Later years and death ==
Following the fall of communism, Fischer led a private life from 1990 and declined all interview requests. In 2000, Fischer briefly served as one of several informal advisors to Gabi Zimmer. He published a book about the East German foreign policy in 2007.

He died in Berlin on 2 April 2020, aged 97.
