= Hoort =

- Municipality
- Location of Hoort within Ludwigslust-Parchim district
- Interactive map of Hoort
- Location within Germany Location within Mecklenburg-Vorpommern
- Coordinates: 53°28′N 11°22′E
- Country: Germany
- State: Mecklenburg-Vorpommern
- District: Ludwigslust-Parchim
- Municipal assoc.: Hagenow-Land
- Subdivisions: 2

Government
  - Mayor: Uwe Tanneberg

Area
  - Total: 22.12 km^{2} (8.54 sq mi)
- Elevation: 39 m (128 ft)

Population (2025-12-31)
  - Total: 566
  - Density: 25.6/km^{2} (66.3/sq mi)
- Time zone: UTC+01:00 (CET)
  - Summer (DST): UTC+02:00 (CEST)
- Postal codes: 19230
- Dialling codes: 038859
- Vehicle registration: LWL
- Website: www.amt-hagenow- land.de

Hoort is a municipality in the Ludwigslust-Parchim district, in Mecklenburg-Vorpommern, Germany.

Administratively Hoort now also incorporates Neu Zachun.
