= Social Democratic Party in the GDR =

Social Democratic Party in the GDR Sozialdemokratische Partei in der DDR
- Leader: Markus Meckel; Ibrahim Böhme; Wolfgang Thierse
- Founded: 7 October 1989
- Dissolved: 26 September 1990
- Merged into: Social Democratic Party of Germany
- Ideology: Social democracy
- Political position: Centre-left
- Colours: Red

The Social Democratic Party in the GDR (German: Sozialdemokratische Partei in der DDR) was a reconstituted Social Democratic Party existing during the final phase of East Germany. Slightly less than a year after its creation, it merged with its West German counterpart ahead of German reunification.

== History ==
=== Foundation ===
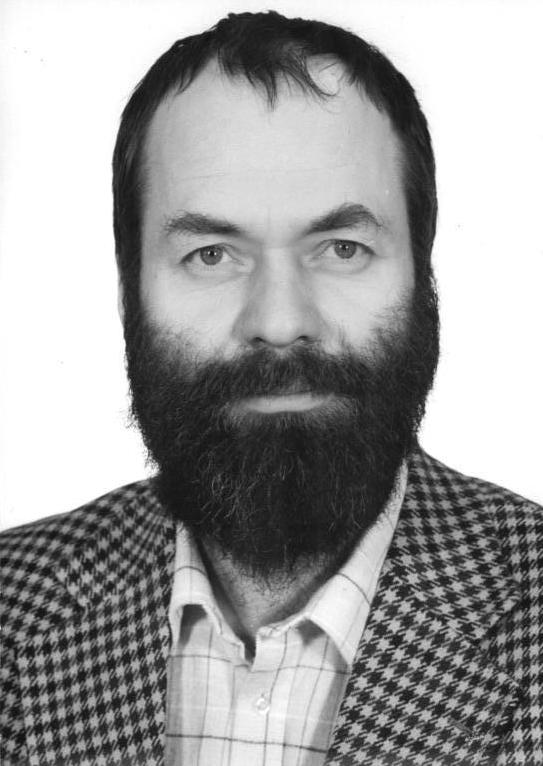
Markus Meckel

What became East Germany was traditionally the heartland for the SPD in united Germany. In 1946, the Soviet occupation authorities forced the eastern branch of the SPD to merge with the eastern branch of the Communist Party of Germany to form the Socialist Unity Party of Germany (SED). Within a short time, however, the few independent-minded members from the SPD side of the merger had been pushed out, and the SED became a full-fledged Communist party–essentially the KPD under a new name.

An Eastern Bureau of the SPD, centered around East Berlin, continued to exist and was allowed to participate in the 1950 Volkskammer election, winning 6 seats. However, it was prevented from participating in the elections from 1954 and onwards under accusations of "espionage" and "diversion" by DDR and SED authorities; it suffered increasing harassment and was eventually closed in 1981.

Early in 1989, the Protestant theologians Markus Meckel and Martin Gutzeit took the initiative to revive a Social Democratic Party in the GDR. The two made organisational preparations and in April 1989 produced the first draft of the foundation appeal. In August, the appeal was presented at the Golgathagemeinde parish in Berlin. The appeal was signed by Meckel, Gutzeit, director and human rights advocate Ibrahim Böhme and theologian Arndt Noack.

Calling for the foundation of a political party outside of the system of the National Front was a direct challenge to the political system of the GDR and especially to the SED, whose basis was undermined by the mere existence of a Social Democratic Party. The SED based its claim to power on being the sole representative of the working class.

On 7 October 1989, forty or fifty people, mostly from Berlin and the southern parts of the country, assembled at the vicarage of Schwante, a town near Berlin, and founded the Social Democratic Party in the GDR. The party chose the abbreviation SDP to avoid associations with the SPD that had merged into the SED, and also to brand itself as independent of the West German SPD. Stephan Hilsberg, a programmer, was elected as the first party spokesman, while Ibrahim Böhme became manager.

=== In opposition ===
Between October and December, local groups of the SDP were formed in different towns. From 7 December 1989, two representatives of the party participated in the Round Table talks between Prime Minister Hans Modrow, who had become the de facto leader of East Germany after the SED surrendered its monopoly of power a week earlier, and various opposition groups. The talks resulted in representatives of the opposition groups joining Modrow's cabinet as ministers without portfolio until free elections to the People's Chamber could be held. On 29 January, Walter Romberg became the first Social Democrat appointed to the cabinet.

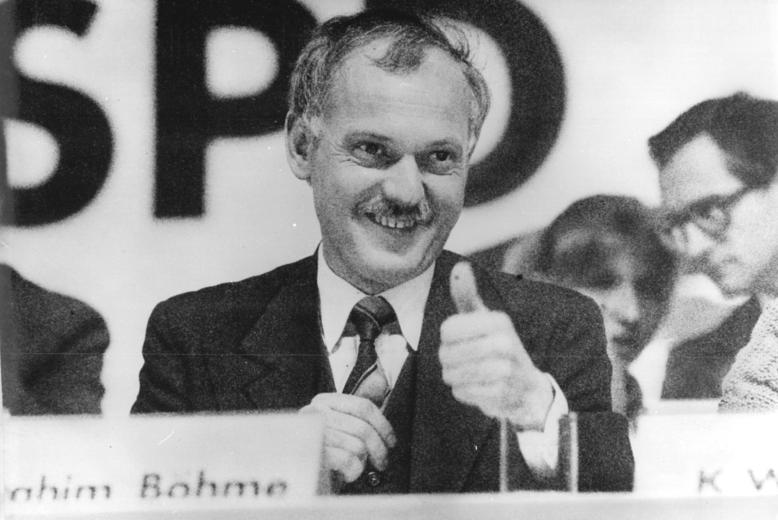
Ibrahim Böhme after being elected party chairman in February 1990.

On 13 January 1990, the party's first Conference of Delegates assembled in Berlin and decided to change the short form of the party name to SPD, to conform with (and profit from association with) the West German SPD. At the same time, party organisation was created at the level of districts and regions.

Elections were scheduled for 18 March. Three weeks before that date, the SPD held its first party congress from 22 to 25 February 1990 in Leipzig. The congress decided on a basic manifesto and a statute of the party and also elected an executive board, with Böhme serving as party chairman and Meckel as one of his deputies.

The election yielded disappointing results for the Social Democrats. Instead of gaining an absolute majority, as they had expected, they won 21.9% of the vote, resulting in 88 seats and second place. The party fared best in the districts of Berlin (34.9%), Potsdam (34.4%) and Frankfurt (Oder) (31.9%), and by far worst in the district of Dresden (9.7%). When the new parliament constituted itself, Social Democrat Reinhard Höppner was elected vice-president of the People's Chamber.

=== In government ===
After internal debates the party members agreed to coalition talks with the winner of the election, the centre-right Alliance for Germany, consisting of the CDU, the DSU and Democratic Awakening, as well as with the Association of Free Democrats, an alliance of liberal parties. On 12 April, Lothar de Maizière of the CDU formed a grand coalition cabinet including six Social Democrats, among them Markus Meckel (foreign affairs), Regine Hildebrandt (social issues) and Walter Romberg (finance). The SPD initially supported de Maizière's policy of speedy reunification with West Germany, but left the cabinet on 20 August.

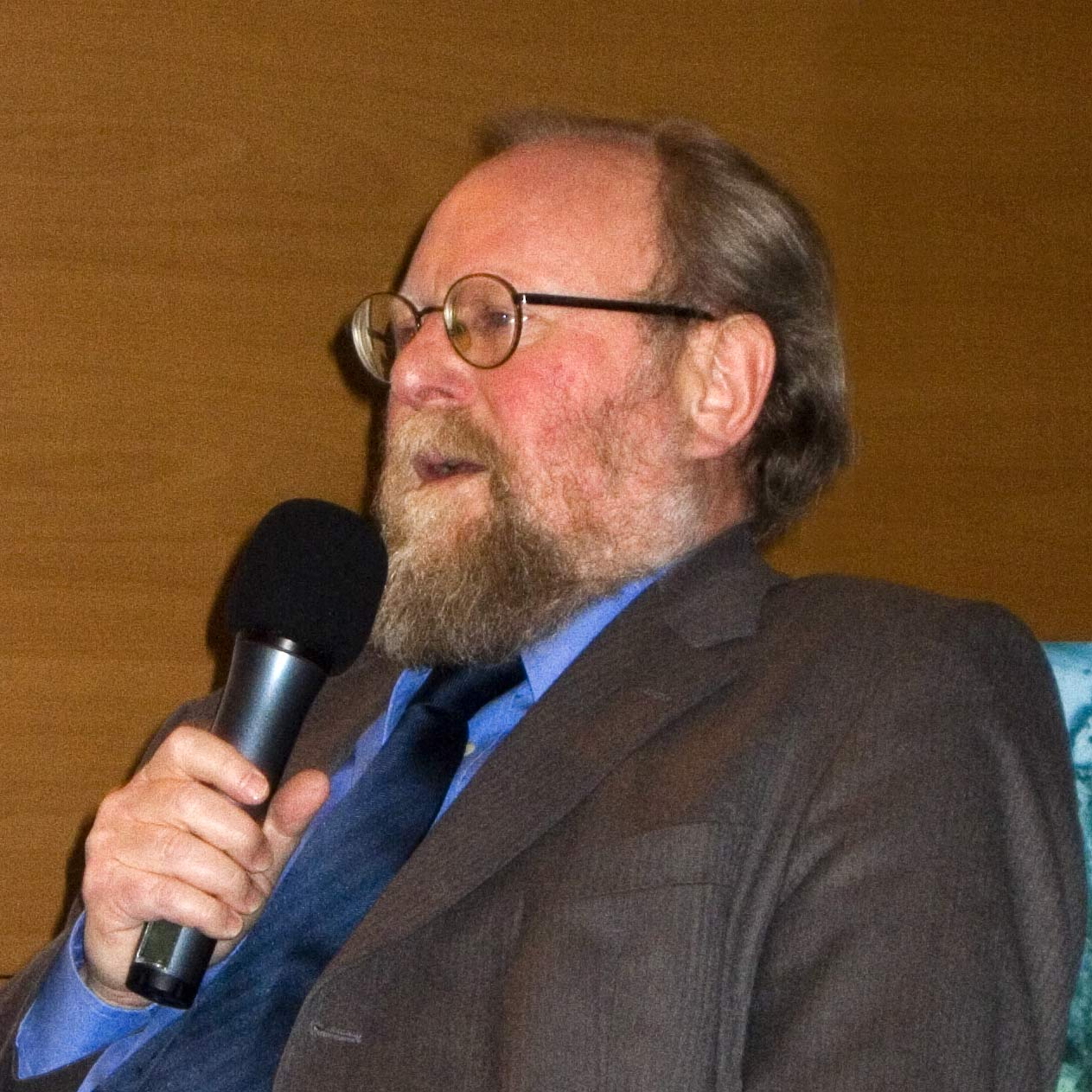
Wolfgang Thierse

Ibrahim Böhme was slated to have been a senior minister in the government. However, during the coalition talks he had been unmasked as a longtime Stasi informer by the West German news magazine Der Spiegel. Though Böhme failed to acknowledge this, he agreed to suspend his party functions (he was later expelled from the party in 1992). On 8 April 1990, Meckel was chosen as the interim chairman, until an extraordinary meeting in Halle (Saale) on 9 June 1990 elected Wolfgang Thierse as the new party chairman. At the same time, Willy Brandt, former Chancellor of West Germany and honorary chairman of the West German SPD, was elected as honorary chairman of the East German SPD as well.

=== Reunification ===
With German reunification approaching on 3 October 1990, the East German SPD held a final party congress on 26 September 1990, and decided to merge with the West German SPD. The following day, Wolfgang Thierse joined the unified party's executive board and was also appointed deputy chairman. He resigned from the latter position in 2005 but remained a member of the party executive until 2009.

== Election results ==
=== GDR Parliament (Volkskammer) ===
Election year	# of votes	% of votes	# of seats won	+/−	Notes
1990	2,525,534	21.9	88 / 400		

== Literature ==
- (in German) Wolfgang Grof: "In der frischen Tradition des Herbstes 1989". Die SDP/SPD in der DDR: Von der Gründung über die Volkskammerarbeit zur deutschen Einheit, Download: als PDF-Datei 308 KB
