= Lothar de Maizière =

Leader of East Germany in 1990

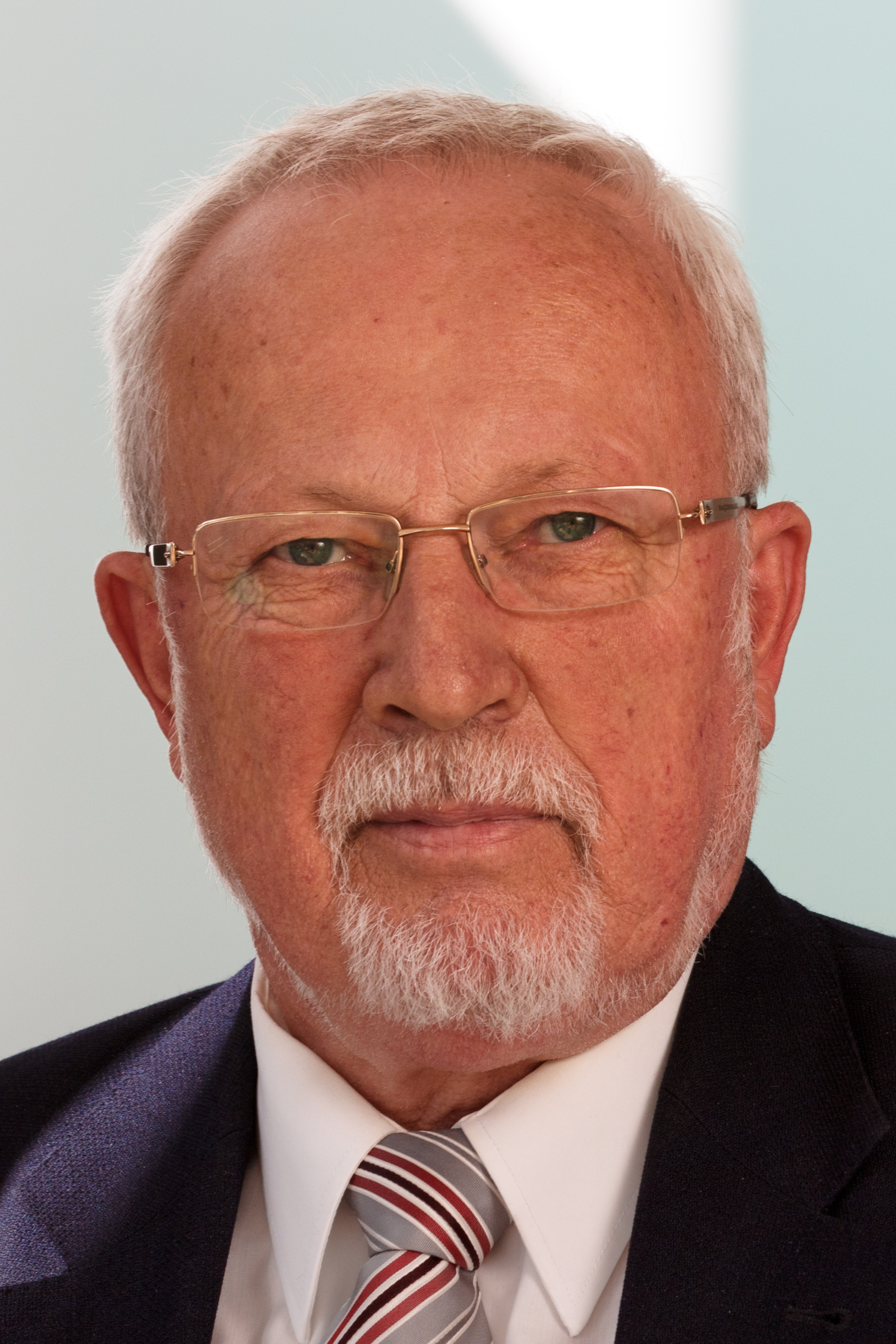
- de Maizière in 2011

Minister for Special Affairs
- In office 3 October 1990 – 17 December 1990 Serving with Rudolf Seiters, Hans Klein, Sabine Bergmann-Pohl, Günther Krause, Rainer Ortleb, Hansjoachim Walther
- Chancellor: Helmut Kohl
- Preceded by: Position established
- Succeeded by: Position abolished

Minister-President of East Germany
- In office 12 April 1990 – 2 October 1990
- Head of state: Sabine Bergmann-Pohl (interim)
- Deputy: Peter-Michael Diestel
- Preceded by: Hans Modrow (as Chairman of the Council of Ministers)
- Succeeded by: Helmut Kohl (as Chancellor of Germany)

Minister of Foreign Affairs
- Acting
- In office 20 August 1990 – 2 October 1990
- Minister-President: himself
- Preceded by: Markus Meckel
- Succeeded by: Position abolished
Modrow Government
Deputy Chairman of the Council of Ministers
In office 18 November 1989 – 12 April 1990 Serving with Christa Luft, Peter Moreth
Chairman	Hans Modrow
Preceded by	Günther Kleiber; Alfred Neumann
Succeeded by	Peter-Michael Diestel (Deputy Minister-President)
Minister for Church Affairs
In office 18 November 1989 – 12 April 1990
Chairman of the Council of Ministers	Hans Modrow
Preceded by	Kurt Löffler (as State Secretary)
Succeeded by	Position abolished
Parliamentary constituencies
Member of the Bundestag for Brandenburg (Volkskammer; 1990)
In office 3 October 1990 – 15 October 1991
Preceded by	Constituency established
Succeeded by	Else Ackermann
Member of the Volkskammer for Berlin
In office 5 April 1990 – 2 October 1990
Preceded by	Constituency established
Succeeded by	Constituency abolished

Personal details
- Born: 2 March 1940 (age 86) Nordhausen, Germany
- Party: Christian Democratic Union (1990–present)
- Other political affiliations: Christian Democratic Union (East Germany) (1956–1990)
- Children: 3
- Education: Hochschule für Musik Hanns Eisler Berlin; Humboldt University of Berlin
- Occupation: Politician; Lawyer; Musician
- Other offices held: 1990–1991: Deputy Chairman, Christian Democratic Union; 1990–1991: Chairman, Christian Democratic Union of Brandenburg; 1989–1990: Chairman, Christian Democratic Union (East Germany)

Lothar de Maizière (German pronunciation: [də mɛˈzi̯ɛːɐ̯]; born 2 March 1940) is a German former politician of the Christian Democratic Union. In 1990, he served as the head of the first and only democratically elected government of East Germany, holding this office during the final months before German reunification. Subsequently he briefly served as a minister in the new government of the unified Federal Republic of Germany until his past as a Stasi informant was revealed.

== Family background ==
Maizière is of French ancestry, descending from a Huguenot family that fled religious persecution in France during the late 17th century. The family took its name from the town of Maizières-lès-Metz and sought refuge in Prussia, where they became part of a broader Huguenot community that integrated into Berlin society while retaining French cultural ties. For generations, the Maizières attended French-language schools and worshipped in Huguenot churches in the capital, a tradition that lasted well into the early 20th century.

Lothar is the son of Clement de Maizière, a lawyer, and part of a prominent family with deep roots in both East and West German public life. His uncle, Ulrich de Maizière, served as Inspector General of the Bundeswehr, the highest-ranking military officer in West Germany. His cousin, Thomas de Maizière, became a key political figure in unified Germany, serving as a close advisor to Chancellor Angela Merkel and holding several ministerial positions, most notably as Federal Minister of the Interior from 2013 to 2018 in Merkel’s third cabinet.

== Early life and education ==
Maizière was born in Nordhausen, Thuringia, and attended the ancient Berlinisches Gymnasium zum Grauen Kloster, where he was one of the last pupils before the school closed in 1958. He next studied viola at the Hanns Eisler College of Music in East Berlin from 1959 to 1965. He played in the Berlin Symphony Orchestra before studying law by distance learning through the Humboldt University of Berlin from 1969 to 1975.

== Career ==
A longtime member of the East German Christian Democratic Union (CDU), Maizière rose to national prominence during the political upheavals that followed the fall of the Berlin Wall. In late 1989, he played a key role in removing the party's pro-Communist leadership, helping to steer the CDU away from its long-standing subordination to the ruling Socialist Unity Party of Germany (SED). He was elected party chairman in November of that year and became one of the leading figures in the transition to democracy. In the historic March 1990 election, the first and only free election in the German Democratic Republic (GDR), the CDU and its allies emerged victorious, positioning Maizière to take on a leading role in the new government.

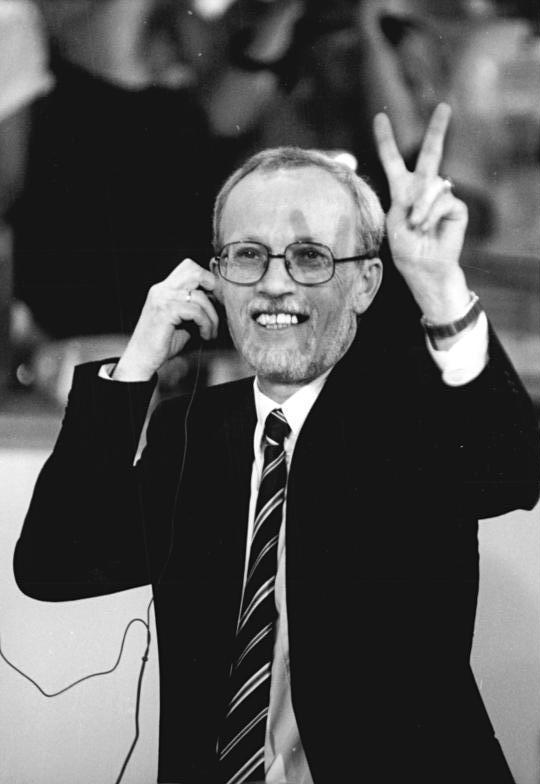
de Maizière in the aftermath of the 1990 East German general election giving a peace hand sign

Following the CDU's electoral victory, Maizière was elected to the Volkskammer and, one month later, succeeded Hans Modrow as Premier of East Germany, a role he held from 12 April to 2 October 1990 as head of the de Maizière cabinet. His government focused almost exclusively on reunification, working closely with the West German government led by Helmut Kohl. As Premier, Maizière signed the Treaty on the Final Settlement with Respect to Germany, also known as the "Two Plus Four Agreement", which formally ended the postwar rights of the Allied powers in Germany and laid the legal groundwork for reunification. This agreement, combined with a series of political, legal and economic steps, led to the dissolution of the GDR on 3 October 1990, with its territory becoming part of the Federal Republic of Germany (FRG).

=== Resignation ===
After reunification, Maizière joined the federal government as Minister for Special Affairs in Chancellor Kohl's cabinet, a post meant to provide representation for the newly incorporated eastern states. However, his political career came to an abrupt end just months later. On 17 December 1990, Maizière resigned after allegations surfaced that he had served as an informant for the East German secret police, the Stasi, under the codename "IM Czerni". Though Maizière initially denied any wrongdoing, reports from the Stasi Records Agency indicated that he had provided information to the Stasi. The revelations caused widespread disillusionment, particularly in light of his prominent role in the democratic transition.

Political offices
Preceded by Hans Modrow	Chairman of the Council of Ministers of the German Democratic Republic; 1990	Succeeded by Helmut Kohl as Chancellor of United Germany
