= Ministry of Finance (East Germany) =

The Ministry of Finance (MoF) was an organ of the Council of Ministers of the GDR responsible for the planning, accounting, and financial reporting of the state finances. From April 1990 until the German reunification in October 1990, it was named the "Ministry for Finance and Prices". The Ministry of Finance was headquartered at the Haus am Werderschen Markt until 1959. With the occupation of the Central Committee of the SED, the ministry moved its headquarters to the Haus der Ministerien on Leipziger Straße 5–7. The predecessor institutions were the German Central Administration of Finance from 1945 to 1948 and the DWK, Main Financial Administration from 1948 to 1949.

== Responsibilities ==
The responsibilities of the Ministry of Finance included:

- Ensuring the liquidity of the state budget
- Financing the national economy (investments)
- Preparation of financial legislation
- Steering and control functions in economic processes
- Preparation and execution of international payment and financial agreements
- Management of financial audits for state institutions and enterprises
- Development of regulations for:
  - Insurance sector (State Insurance of the GDR)
  - Taxation
  - Personnel management
  - Production and use of precious metals
  - Administration and utilization of state property

The ministry, as an organ of the Council of Ministers, was responsible for the planning, accounting, and settlement of state finances, as well as the leadership and planning of the state budget. It also prepared financial legislation, participated in international payment and financial agreements, contributed to the bodies of the Council for Mutual Economic Assistance (CMEA), led the State Financial Audit (SFA), developed regulations, managed taxation and personnel matters, and oversaw the production and use of precious metals and state property. It had steering and control functions in the economic cycle of the GDR. The MoF developed the financial balance of the state and was responsible for the currency service plan.

Since 1965, the ministry had been utilizing computer technology, primarily for calculating the state budget and implementing industrial price reforms. Alongside other ministries, it was an early adopter of computer technology for widespread use of information technology in the GDR. In 1970, the ministry's data processing centers were spun off as the VEB Datenverarbeitung der Finanzorgane.

== Ministers ==
- Hans Loch (LDPD, 1949–1955)
- Willy Rumpf (SED, 1955–1966)
- Siegfried Böhm (SED, 1966–1980)
- Werner Schmieder (SED, 1980–1981)
- Ernst Höfner (SED, 1981–1989)
- Uta Nickel (SED-PDS, 1989–1990)
- Walter Siegert (Politician) (SED-PDS / Independent, 1990)
- Walter Romberg (SPD, 1990)
- Werner Skowron (CDU, 1990)

== State Secretaries ==
- Dieter Rudorf (March 1990 – August 1990)
- Martin Maaßen (May 1990)
- Walter Siegert (Politician) (later Minister)
- Werner Skowron (until August 15, 1990, then Minister)

== Institutions ==
The following institutions were subordinate to the MoF:

- Financial Economic Research Institute for developing the scientific basis for advancing socialist planned economy and "socialist financial economics"
- VEB Datenverarbeitung der Finanzorgane
- Until 1968/69, the Savings Banks sector, including the Sparkasse (East Germany)
