= List of German finance ministers =

Minister of Finance
- Finanzminister
- Coat of arms of the German Government

- State flag of Germany

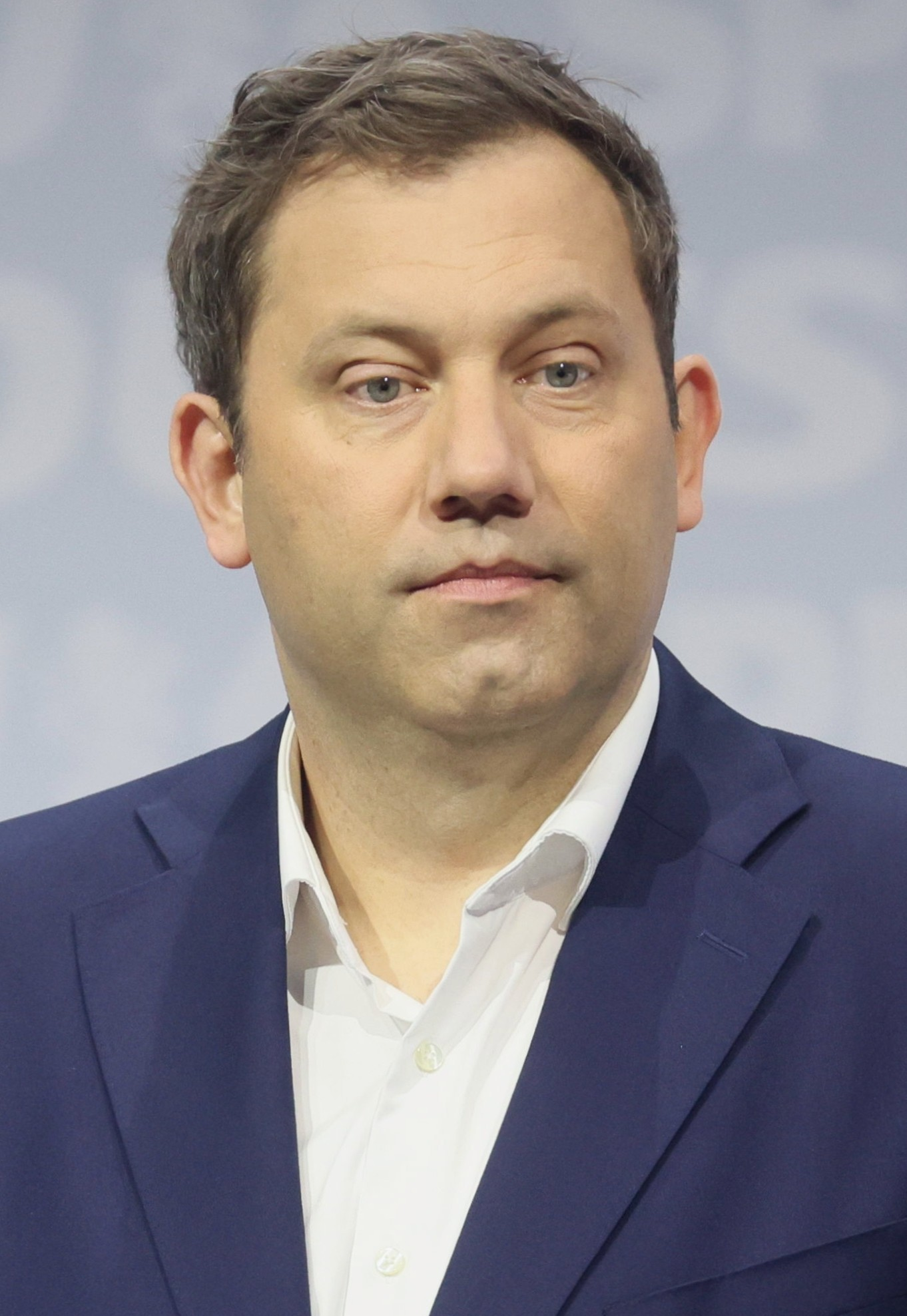
- Incumbent; Lars Klingbeil since 6 May 2025
- Federal Ministry of Finance
- Member of: Federal Cabinet
- Appointer: The chancellor
- Formation: 1880
- First holder: Adolf von Scholz

The minister of finance of Germany (German: Finanzminister) is the head of the Federal Ministry of Finance and a member of the Federal Cabinet.

== State secretaries for finance of the German Empire (1880–1918) ==
- Adolf Heinrich Wilhelm Scholz 1880–1882
- Franz Emil Emanuel von Burchard 1882–1886
- Karl Rudolf Jacobi 1886–1888
- Baron Helmuth von Maltzahn 1888–1893
- Count Arthur von Posadowsky-Wehner 1893–1897
- Baron Max Franz Guido von Thielmann 1897–1903
- Baron Hermann von Stengel 1903–1908
- Reinhold Sydow 1908–1909
- Adolf Wermuth 1909–1912
- Hermann Kühn 1912–1915
- Karl Helfferich 1915–1916
- Count Siegfried von Roedern 1916–1918

== Ministers of finance (1918–1945) ==
No.	Portrait	Name (born and died)	Term			Political party	Government
No.	Portrait	Name (born and died)	Took office	Left office	Time in office	Political party	Government
1	Eugen Schiffer	Eugen Schiffer (1860–1954)	13 February 1919	19 April 1919	65 days	DDP	Scheidemann
2	Bernhard Dernburg	Bernhard Dernburg (1865–1937)	19 April 1919	20 June 1919	62 days	DDP	Scheidemann
3	Matthias Erzberger	Matthias Erzberger (1875–1921)	21 June 1919	12 March 1920	265 days	Centre	Bauer
4	Joseph Wirth	Joseph Wirth (1879–1956)	27 March 1920	22 October 1921	1 year, 209 days	Centre	Müller I Fehrenbach; Wirth I
5	Andreas Hermes	Andreas Hermes (1878–1964)	26 October 1921	13 August 1923	1 year, 291 days	Centre	Wirth II; Cuno
6	Rudolf Hilferding	Rudolf Hilferding (1877–1941)	13 August 1923	1 October 1923	49 days	SPD	Stresemann I
7	Hans Luther	Hans Luther (1879–1962)	6 October 1923	15 December 1924	1 year, 70 days	Independent	Stresemann II; Marx I–II
8	Otto von Schlieben	Otto von Schlieben (1875–1932)	19 January 1925	26 October 1925	280 days	DNVP	Luther I
–	Hans Luther	Hans Luther (1879–1962); Acting	26 October 1925	20 January 1926	86 days	Independent	Luther I
9	Peter Reinhold	Peter Reinhold (1887–1955)	20 January 1926	29 January 1927	1 year, 9 days	DDP	Luther II; Marx III
10	Heinrich Köhler	Heinrich Köhler (1878–1949)	29 January 1927	29 June 1928	1 year, 152 days	Centre	Marx IV
(6)	Rudolf Hilferding	Rudolf Hilferding (1877–1941)	29 June 1928	21 December 1929	1 year, 175 days	SPD	Müller II
11	Paul Moldenhauer	Paul Moldenhauer (1876–1947)	23 December 1929	20 June 1930	179 days	DVP	Müller II; Brüning I
–	Heinrich Brüning	Heinrich Brüning (1885–1970); Acting	20 June 1930	26 June 1930	6 days	Centre	Brüning I
12	Hermann Dietrich	Hermann Dietrich (1879–1954)	26 June 1930	1 June 1932	1 year, 341 days	DStP	Brüning I–II
13	Lutz Graf Schwerin von Krosigk	Lutz Graf Schwerin von Krosigk (1887–1977) (Independent until 1937)	1 June 1932	23 May 1945	12 years, 356 days	NSDAP	Papen; Schleicher; Hitler; Goebbels; Schwerin von Krosigk

== Ministers of finance of the German Democratic Republic (1949–1990) ==
No.	Portrait	Name (born and died)	Term			Political party	Government
No.	Portrait	Name (born and died)	Took office	Left office	Time in office	Political party	Government
1	Hans Loch	Hans Loch (1898–1960)	11 October 1949	26 November 1955	6 years, 46 days	LDPD	Provisional government Council of Ministers (1950–1954) (1954–1958)
2	Willy Rumpf	Willy Rumpf (1903–1982)	26 November 1955	12 December 1966	11 years, 16 days	SED	Council of Ministers (1954–1958) (1958–1963) (1963–1967)
3	Siegfried Böhm	Siegfried Böhm (1928–1980)	12 December 1966	5 May 1980	13 years, 145 days	SED	Council of Ministers (1963–1967) (1967–1971) (1971–1976) (1976–1981)
4	Werner Schmieder	Werner Schmieder (born 1926)	5 May 1980	26 June 1981	1 year, 52 days	SED	Council of Ministers (1976–1981)
5	Ernst Höfner	Ernst Höfner (1929–2009)	26 June 1981	7 November 1989	8 years, 134 days	SED	Council of Ministers (1981–1986) (1986-1989)
6	Uta Nickel	Uta Nickel (born 1941)	18 November 1989	12 April 1990	145 days	SED	Modrow
7	Walter Romberg	Walter Romberg (1928–2014)	12 April 1990	16 August 1990	126 days	SPD	de Maizière
–	Werner Skowron [de]	Werner Skowron (1943–2016); Acting	16 August 1990	2 October 1990	47 days	CDU	de Maizière

== Ministers of finance of the Federal Republic of Germany (1949–present) ==
Political party: CSU CDU FDP SPD

Name (born and died)		Party	Term of office		Chancellor (Cabinet)
1	Fritz Schäffer (1888–1967)	CSU	20 September 1949	29 October 1957	Adenauer (I • II)
2	Franz Etzel (1902–1970)	CDU	29 October 1957	14 November 1961	Adenauer (III)
3	Heinz Starke (1911–2001)	FDP	14 November 1961	19 November 1962	Adenauer (IV)
4	Rolf Dahlgrün (1908–1969)	FDP	14 December 1962	28 October 1966	Adenauer (V); Erhard (I • II)
5	Kurt Schmücker (1919–1996)	CDU	8 November 1966	30 November 1966	Erhard (II)
6	Franz Josef Strauß (1915–1988)	CSU	1 December 1966	21 October 1969	Kiesinger (I)
7	Alex Möller (1903–1985)	SPD	22 October 1969	13 May 1971	Brandt (I)
8	Karl Schiller (1911–1994)	SPD	13 May 1971	7 July 1972	Brandt (I)
9	Helmut Schmidt (1918–2015)	SPD	7 July 1972	1 May 1974	Brandt (I • II)
10	Hans Apel (1932–2011)	SPD	16 May 1974	15 February 1978	Schmidt (I • II)
11	Hans Matthöfer (1925–2009)	SPD	16 February 1978	28 April 1982	Schmidt (II • III)
12	Manfred Lahnstein (b. 1937)	SPD	28 April 1982	1 October 1982	Schmidt (III)
13	Gerhard Stoltenberg (1928–2001)	CDU	4 October 1982	21 April 1989	Kohl (I • II • III)
14	Theodor Waigel (b. 1939)	CSU	21 April 1989	27 October 1998	Kohl (III • IV • V)
15	Oskar Lafontaine (b. 1943)	SPD	27 October 1998	18 March 1999	Schröder (I)
16	Hans Eichel (b. 1941)	SPD	12 April 1999	22 November 2005	Schröder (I • II)
17	Peer Steinbrück (b. 1947)	SPD	22 November 2005	28 October 2009	Merkel (I)
18	Wolfgang Schäuble (1942–2023)	CDU	28 October 2009	24 October 2017	Merkel (II • III)
–	Peter Altmaier (acting) (b. 1958)	CDU	24 October 2017	14 March 2018	Merkel (III)
19	Olaf Scholz (b. 1958)	SPD	14 March 2018	8 December 2021	Merkel (IV)
20	Christian Lindner (b. 1979)	FDP	8 December 2021	7 November 2024	Scholz (I)
21	Jörg Kukies (b. 1968)	SPD	7 November 2024	6 May 2025	Scholz (I)
22	Lars Klingbeil (b. 1978)	SPD	6 May 2025	incumbent	Merz (I)

== See also ==
- List of deputy finance ministers of Germany
