= Gerhard Beil =

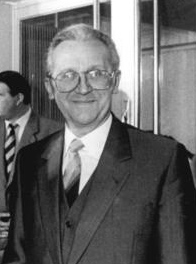
Gerhard Beil in 1986.

Gerhard Beil (28 May 1926, Leipzig – 19 August 2010, Berlin) was a politician for the SED and the Minister for Foreign Trade of the GDR.

== Life ==
After completing primary school, Beil trained as a commercial clerk. From 1943 to 1945 he was with the Reich Labor Service. In April 1944 he applied for membership in the NSDAP, but was rejected in October 1944.

In 1945 he became a locksmith and worked in the sales department of I.G. Farben in Frankfurt am Main (1946/1947), as a machinist in the brown coal plant Espenhain, miner at Wismut AG Aue (1949) and steel locksmith in Leipzig (1950 to 1952).

In 1949 Beil joined the FDJ. He studied in Berlin from 1953/1954 at the Hochschule für Planökonomie and until 1957 at the Humboldt-Universität with a degree in economics. In 1953 he joined the SED. From 1954 to 1956 he worked as a department and main department head in the State Secretariat for Local Economics. After that as senior and main speaker in the Ministry for Inner German Trade, Foreign Trade and Material Supply. After a complaint about violation of party discipline, he was a research assistant at the Commercial Representation of the GDR in Austria from 1958 to 1961.

From 1961 Beil worked again in the Ministry of Foreign Trade, initially as head of Western Europe (until 1965), 1969 to 1976 as State Secretary and from 1976 also as the first Deputy Minister.

From 1976 he was a candidate, from 1981 to 1989 member of the Central Committee of the SED, from 1977 member of the Council of Ministers of the GDR. From 1986 to 1990 he was the successor of Horst Sölle Minister for Foreign Trade of the GDR – he accompanied Erich Honecker on his trips to western countries.

Beil was one of the authors of the "Analysis of the Economic Situation of the GDR with Conclusions" together with Gerhard Schürer, Ernst Höfner, Alexander Schalck-Golodkowski and Arno Donda, as a template for the Politbüro of the SED on 30 October 1989. In this secret report, also known as "Schürer paper", the over-indebtedness and economic disruption of the GDR became clearly known for the first time.

Until his retirement, Gerhard Beil was an advisor to the Government of Maizière.

Beil and his wife were members of the party Die Linke. Gerhard Beil saw himself as a communist.

Gerhard Beil died on 19 August 2010 of heart failure in Berlin-Karolinenhof.

== Literature ==
- Gerhard Beil: Foreign trade and politics. A Minister remembers , Berlin: Edition Ost, 2010, ISBN 978-3-360-01805-2.
- Lothar de Maizière: I don't want my children to have to lie anymore , Freiburg: Herder, 2010, ISBN 978-3-451-30355-5, pp. 98–100, 105.
