= Fritz Müller (politician) =

Head of the Cadre Affairs Department of the Central Committee
- In office May 1960 – 28 November 1989
- Secretary: Alfred Neumann; Erich Honecker
- Deputy: Horst Wagner; Heinz Wieland; Horst Conrad
- Preceded by: Heinz Wieland
- Succeeded by: Position abolished

Head of the Planning and Finance Department of the Central Committee
- In office June 1955 – May 1960
- Secretary: Gerhart Ziller; Erich Apel
- Deputy: Gerhard Schürer
- Preceded by: Helmut Sandig
- Succeeded by: Gerhard Schürer

Personal details
- Born: Fritz Müller; 3 December 1920 Forst (Lausitz), Province of Brandenburg, Free State of Prussia, Weimar Republic (now Brandenburg, Germany)
- Died: 15 April 2001 (aged 80)
- Party: SED-PDS (1989–1990)
- Other political affiliations: Socialist Unity Party (1947–1989); Nazi Party (1939–1945)
- Occupation: Politician; Party Functionary
- Awards: Patriotic Order of Merit, 1st class; Banner of Labor; Order of Karl Marx
- Central institution membership: 1967–1989: Full member, Central Committee; 1963–1967: Candidate member, Central Committee; Other offices held: 1979–1989: First Secretary, Central Committee party organization

Fritz Müller (3 December 1920 – 15 April 2001) was an official of East Germany's ruling Socialist Unity Party of Germany (SED / Sozialistische Einheitspartei Deutschlands). He headed up the Central Committee's important Cadre Affairs Department between 1960 and 1989.

== Life ==
Fritz Müller was born in Forst (Lausitz), on the western shore of the Neisse River and roughly 25 km (15 miles) to the east of Cottbus, in what was then central Germany. His father made cigarettes. He left school and started on a commercial training in 1937. Germany had become a one-party dictatorship during the months following January 1933, and in 1938 Fritz Müller became a member of the ruling Nazi Party.

He fought as a soldier in the Second World War, ending up as a Non-commissioned officer. The war ended in May 1945. Between May 1945 and December 1947 Fritz Müller was detained by the Soviet army as a prisoner of war. During this time he joined an Anti-Fascist circle at the Nizhny Tagil detention camp, and was employed in mining.

It was not unheard of for former Nazi Party members to turn up later as members of the German Democratic Republic's ruling SED (party), but it was rare enough to invite comment. Günter Schabowski later gave his opinion on these cases:

"A Nazi who became a fully committed Socialist, more precisely a Communist, was totally and permanently de-Nazified. He was born again. But when he was re-educated into West German democracy, the Nazi remained a Nazi.
„Ein Nazi, dem es gewährt war, zum Sozialisten, genauer zum Kommunisten zu mutieren, war total und für immer entnazifiziert. Er war wie neugeboren. Wen aber die westdeutsche Demokratie umerzog, der blieb ein Nazi.“

Günter Schabowski quoted in 2009 in the context of a discussion about Fritz Müller and Günter Guillaume

When he returned home at the end of 1947, the frontier on each side of Poland had moved and Forst was now a frontier town, across the river from Poland. The entire eastern portion of what remained of Germany was now administered as the Soviet occupation zone, and following the contentious creation, in April 1946, of the Socialist Unity Party of Germany (SED / Sozialistische Einheitspartei Deutschlands) was well on its way to reverting to one-party dictatorship. From his subsequent career it is apparent that at some stage, probably before the entire region was re-founded as the German Democratic Republic in October 1949, Fritz Müller joined the young country's ruling SED (party), but available sources are silent as to when this happened. Back in Forst, in December 1947 he obtained a job in the council planning department, becoming head of department three months later. In 1950 he took on the same job, but now at a regional level, for the Frankfurt (Oder) district.

Shortly after this, in 1951, he became an instructor in the Economic Policy department of The Party's regional leadership for the whole of Brandenburg. However, the regional tier of government was abolished in 1952 as part of a strategy to centralise party/government control, and in August 1952 Müller was given the same job in the city of Cottbus. He left after a few months, to begin in March 1953 a period of study at the Regional Party Academy in Ballenstedt. On graduating he remained at the Party Academy, now as a Deputy Head and Economics teacher between 1954 and 1955.

In June 1955 Fritz Müller relocated to Berlin. Here he succeeded Helmut Sandig as Planning and Finance Department of the Party Central Committee. The country's classic Leninist constitutional arrangements insisted on the "Leading role" of the ruling party, which made the central committee the dominant element in ruling East Germany. In May 1960 Fritz Müller was appointed head of the Central Committee's Cadre Affairs Department, a position he would hold for nearly three decades. The post gave him responsibility for the further training of party officers and of officers of the approved mass movements that were a feature of the political structure applied in the Soviet Union and its satellite states. He was also responsible for Personnel Strategy within the SED (party) and thereby also of the entire nomenklatura structure, embracing the relevant organisations and institutions. His own name first appeared on the candidate list for central committee membership in 1963. In 1967 he became one of the (by this time) 131 members of the Party Central Committee. Additionally, in April 1979 he succeeded Kurt Tiedke as First Secretary in the Central Leadership of the Party Organisation in the Central Committee Apparatus.

The changes of 1989/90 heralded the end of the German Democratic Republic as a standalone state, and they also signaled the end of Fritz Müller's political career. On 8 November 1989 the Central Committee Politburo resigned, Müller was relieved of his Central Committee duties on 28 November 1989. A few months later, on 10 February 1990, he was excluded from the Party of Democratic Socialism (PDS), the name by which East Germany's old SED (party) was now in the process, slightly hesitantly, of trying to reinvent itself in anticipation of a more democratic future.

== Awards and honours ==
- 1959: Patriotic Order of Merit in bronze
- 1964: Patriotic Order of Merit in silver
- 1969: Banner of Labor
- 1970: Patriotic Order of Merit in gold
- 1980: Patriotic Order of Merit gold clasp
- 1981: Banner of Labor
- 1984: Order of Karl Marx
- 1985: Order of Karl Marx
