= Arno Donda =

East German economist and statistician (1930–2008)

- Born: 28 April 1930; Berlin, Germany
- Died: 24 November 2008 (aged 78); Berlin, Germany
- Occupations: economist statistician university teacher Director of National Statistical Authority
- Political party: SED

Arno Donda (28 April 1930 – 24 November 2008) was an East German economist and statistician. Between July 1963 and October 1990 he was in charge of the East German Statistical Authority ("Staatliche Zentralverwaltung für Statistik").

== Life ==
Arno Donda was born in Berlin. His father worked as a typesetter. He attended middle school in Rumburg and Berlin before transferring, in 1947, to an apprenticeship with the main office of the statistic office in the region that was, by this time, administered as the Soviet occupation zone. He left the school before attempting school final exams ("Abitur"), but by attending evening classes he was able to sit for and passed these exams in 1949 in Berlin as an external student, which opened the way to a university-level education.

In 1947 he joined the Socialist Unity Party ("Sozialistische Einheitspartei Deutschlands" / SED), a new political party formed in the Soviet zone during April 1946, through a contentious political merger. The creation of the SED was presented as a way to prevent a repeat victory of right-wing populism by ensuring that the political left was unified. However, by the time the region was rebranded and relaunched, in October 1949, as the German Democratic Republic (East Germany) the SED was itself coming to be recognised as the ruling party in a new kind of one-party dictatorship. During 1949 Arno Donda obtained a job in the main office of the national Trade Commission, promoted to the position of "kommissarisches Leiter" by 1950, which was when he enrolled as a student at Berlin's Economics Academy ("Hochschule für Ökonomie" / HfÖ). He concluded his course in 1954 with a degree in economics. Donda stayed on at the HfÖ, successively as an assistant, a chief assistant and a lecturer. He received his doctorate in economics in 1957. His dissertation concerned the relationship between retail prices and the cost of living. In 1959 he became Director of the Institute for Statistics at the HfÖ, retaining the position till his unexpected career switch in 1963. He obtained his habilitation (higher academic qualification) in 1962, becoming a professor as a result. This time his dissertation concerned the statistical reflection of the dynamics of performance and inputs in socialist retail trade in East Germany ("Die statistische Widerspiegelung der Dynamik von Leistung und Aufwand im sozialistischen Einzelhandel der DDR"). He was also appointed a member of the Bernau working group mandated to develop the so-called New Economic System of Planning and Management ("Neues Ökonomisches System der Planung und Leitung"/ NÖS).

On 19 December 1962 Heinz Rauch, his wife, and two of his three sons were killed in a plane crash in Warsaw. Rauch was head of the East German Statistical Authority ("Staatliche Zentralverwaltung für Statistik") at the time. Despite being only 33, Arno Donda was appointed to take on the position. Reflecting the inherently political focus of the statistical authority, Donda took over Rauch's seat on the Ministerial Council between 1963 and 1967. He was also a member, between 1967 and 1990, of the Comecon standing committee for statistics. Between 1971 and 1990 he was a member of the International Statistical Institute, based in Leidschenveen-Ypenburg (den Haag)): while a member of that he became a founder member, in 1979, of the institute's commission for constructing a "Code of Ethics for Statisticians", which the institute subsequently accepted, by a resolution of its general assembly, on 21 August 1985. Despite the mutual suspicions arising from the Cold War tensions of the period, Arno Donda was widely respected in the international statistics community for his ability and integrity. Between 1980 and 1985 he served as vice-president of the Conference of European Statisticians: in 1987 he was its president. He also belonged to several other international academic institutions. On the domestic front, he became a corresponding member of the (East) German Academy of Sciences in 1979.

== The Schürer report and the changes ==
Arno Donda was a co-author of the so-called Schürer report, presented on 30 October 1989. Other members of Schürer's team of economic experts included Ernst Höfner and Alexander Schalck-Golodkowski. The report comprised an "Analysis of the Economic Condition of the German Democratic Republic, with conclusions" ("Analyse der ökonomischen Lage der DDR mit Schlußfolgerungen"). It had been commissioned by the newly appointed Party Secretary Egon Krenz, for presentation to the Politburo. The analysis disclosed a catastrophic picture. The East German economy was over-indebted and had for years "been consuming itself" ("zehrt seit Jahren von der Substanz"). A far reaching economic reform programme was proposed, but in the view of the authors that would not be enough to avert looming national insolvency. The only remaining hope was massive additional loans from the German Federal Republic ("West Germany").

The winds of Glasnost had been blowing across from, of all places, Moscow since 1986 resonated strongly in the German Democratic Republic. Street protesters breached the Berlin Wall in November 1989 and it became clear that Soviet troops had no instructions to re-enact the brutal suppression of 1953 or 1968. As further changes unfolded during 1989/90 it turned out that the economic solution for the country would arrive not in the form of massive additional loans from the west, but as part of German reunification, which was formally enacted in October 1990. Donda successfully led the successful transition of the East German statistical authority towards integration with its formerly West German counterpart. Till December 1991 he held the title and office, "President of the General Statistical Service of the New Federal States". However, his task having been accomplished the Ministry officials informed him that they had no further use for his services. It was not an unusual experience after 1990 for former senior officials of the East German state, and a sense of injustice is evident in sources. Between 1992 and 1994 he was registered as unemployed. In January 1995 Donda was formally retired, reaching the age of 65 a couple of months later.

Arno Donda died in Berlin.

== Awards and honours ==
- 1964 East German Medal for Merit
- 1969 Patriotic Order of Merit in silver
- 1980 Banner of Labor
