= Gerhard Schürer =

German politician (1921–2010)

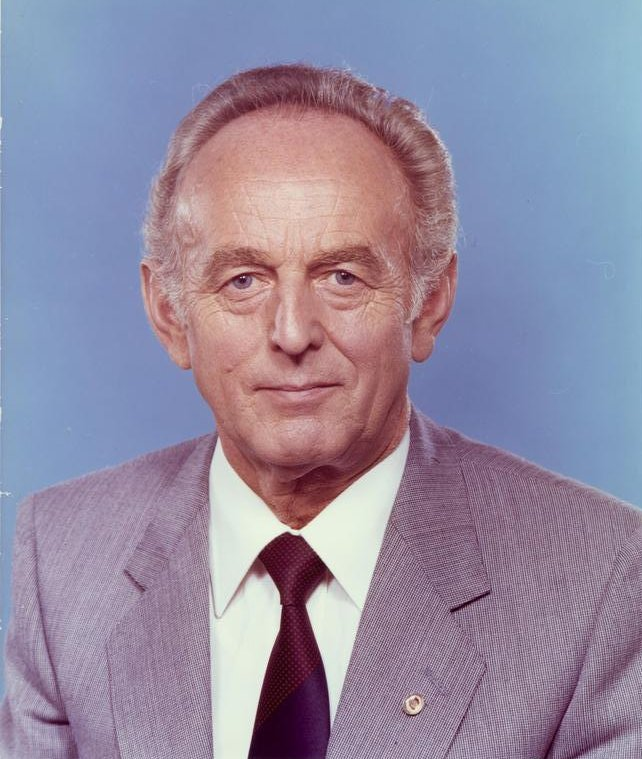
- Schürer in 1982

Chairman of the State Planning Commission
- In office 22 December 1965 – 11 January 1990
- Chairman of the Council of Ministers: Willi Stoph; Horst Sindermann; Willi Stoph; Hans Modrow
- Preceded by: Erich Apel
- Succeeded by: Karl Grünheid (as Chairman of the Economic Committee of the Council of Ministers)

First Deputy Chairman of the State Planning Commission
- In office 14 November 1963 – 22 December 1965 Serving with Karl Grünheid
- Chairman: Erich Apel
- Preceded by: Rudolf Müller
- Succeeded by: Helmut Lilie

Head of the Planning, Finance and Technical Development Department of the Central Committee
- In office 1960–1962
- Secretary: Erich Apel
- Deputy: Walter Halbritter; Siegfried Böhm
- Preceded by: Fritz Müller
- Succeeded by: Siegfried Böhm
Volkskammer
Member of the Volkskammer for Leipzig-Mitte, Leipzig-Südost, Leipzig-Süd (Zwickau-Land, Zwickau-Stadt; 1967-1971)
In office 2 July 1967 – 11 January 1990
Preceded by	multi-member district
Succeeded by	Constituency abolished

Personal details
- Born: Paul Gerhard Schürer; 14 April 1921 Auerbach, Free State of Saxony, Weimar Republic (now Zwickau–Auerbach, Germany)
- Died: 22 December 2010 (aged 89) Berlin, Germany
- Party: Independent
- Other political affiliations: Party of Democratic Socialism (1989–1990); Socialist Unity Party of Germany (1948–1989)
- Children: 8
- Education: Landesparteischule Mecklenburg; Parteihochschule der KPdSU; Engineering School Mittweida
- Occupation: Politician; Civil Servant; Flying Instructor; Locksmith
- Awards: Patriotic Order of Merit; Order of Karl Marx
- Central institution membership: 1989: Full member, Politburo of the Central Committee; 1973–1989: Candidate member, Politburo of the Central Committee; 1963–1989: Full member, Central Committee; Other offices held: 1967–1989: Deputy Chairman, Council of Ministers; 1958–1960: Deputy Head, Planning, Finance and Technical Development Department of the Central Committee

Gerhard Schürer (14 April 1921 – 22 December 2010) was a leading politician in East Germany.

Between 1963 and 1989 he was a member of the powerful Central Committee of the country's ruling SED (party). He also served, between 1965 and 1989, as chairman of the State Planning Commission of East Germany's Council of Ministers.

It is one mark of his importance that during the 1980s Schürer lived with his family at House 7 in the Wandlitz residential estate. Wandlitz was the exclusive Berlin enclave where the top party officials lived. House 7 was a large house, with space to accommodate his (at this stage) second wife and seven children. A previous occupant had been Chairman Walter Ulbricht. After reunification, and as the German Democratic Republic receded into history, there were times when he felt able to recall his experiences with greater candour and clarity than others who had known the ruling establishment from the inside.

== Life ==
=== Early years ===
Paul Gerhard Schürer was born in Auerbach, on the northeastern edge of Zwickau in Saxony. His father was a factory worker and house painter. His mother worked as a hairdresser. After leaving school, between 1936 and 1939 he undertook a training as a machinist. He also undertook flight training with the Hitler youth, learning to fly on a glider. 1939 was the year in which war broke out, and after serving his six-month period of compulsory State Labour Service, Schürer joined the Luftwaffe.

He was badly injured in 1942 and assessed as unfit for frontline service ("frontuntauglich"). Between 1942 and 1945 he worked as a flying instructor, posted at various stages to Pilsen and Dresden-Klotzsche.

=== Soviet occupation zone ===
War ended in May 1945 and a large chunk of what had been central Germany, including both Saxony and the area surrounding Berlin, found itself administered as the Soviet occupation zone. In the immediate aftermath of war Schürer worked in the agriculture sector. Between June and October 1945 he was employed as a steel fitter at the Elbe Valley Iron Works in Dresden. During 1946 he took various factory and driving jobs. In 1946 he obtained work as a truck driver and then obtained a skilled job at a truck plant in Dresden.

Between January and November 1947 Schürer attended the Industrial Management Academy at Mittweida. He became a member of the recently formed Socialist Unity Party (Sozialistische Einheitspartei Deutschlands / SED) in 1948. The SED had been formed a couple of years earlier in a top-down process which had not gone uncontested, and by 1948 it was on the way to becoming the ruling party in a new form of one-party dictatorship. During 1948 Schürer was a student at the SED's local "Ernst Thälmann" party academy ("Kreisparteischule") in Seefrieden. Shortly after this, in October 1949, the Soviet occupation zone was relaunched as the Soviet sponsored German Democratic Republic (East Germany).

=== German Democratic Republic ===
He now moved into regional government, working with the Main Economic Planning Department for Saxony between 1947 and 1951, becoming head of the department. Between March and December 1951 he also served in his first national role, as leader of the Regional Planning Group (later departmental leader) with the State Planning Commission. Evidence that he had been identified for rapid promotion came in 1952 which he spent as a student at the regional party academy.

Between 1953 and 1955 Schürer was employed in the Finance and Planning department of the powerful Party Central Committee. Between 1955 and 1958 he spent much of his time in Moscow where he attended the Communist Party Academy, emerging with a degree. Between 1958 and 1960 he was deputy departmental leader of the Department of Party Central Committee's Planning, Finance and Technical Department, taking over from Fritz Müller as head of the department in 1960. Schürer combined this responsibility with membership of the Politburo's Economics Commission. Further promotion followed in 1962 when he became deputy head of the State Planning Commission. He took over leadership of the Planning Commission just three years later in 1965, when, according to Schürer, the incumbent, Erich Apel, shot himself after failing to win more than lukewarm support from Walter Ulbricht in the context of a trade and finance deal he was attempting to negotiate with the Soviets. For Schürer leadership of the Planning Commission was accompanied by membership of the presidium of the Council of Ministers and, after 1966, co-chairmanship of the East German-Soviet Parity Commission for economic and technical collaboration.

The Leninist precepts of East German constitution set out the "leading role" of the party in unambiguous terms, although the stark reality of the party's leading role was blurred to the extent that Party Central Committee members often combined their party roles with membership of the National parliament or ministerial office. Nevertheless, it was membership of the Party Central Committee, between 1963 and 1989, which placed Gerhard Schürer at the heart of the East German power structure. Within the Central Committee he was also a candidate member of the Politburo from 1973, although it was only towards the end of 1989, a few weeks before the entire government apparatus collapsed, that he finally achieved full membership of the Politburo.

In 1999, pointing out that he had himself been head of the State Planning Commission since 1965, an interviewer asked Gerhard Schürer when he had started to doubt the [East German economic] system:

"In 1971/72, with the formula "unity of economic and social policy" ("Einheit von Wirtschafts- und Sozialpolitik"), Erich Honecker committed to the disastrous course of increasing consumption at the expense of investment - and doing it on credit. When I warned Honecker against this policy in the Politburo I was brushed aside as a "saboteur". Everyone was happy about the resulting improved consumption - and the balance of payments was a "classified secret" ("Geheime Verschlusssache"), which no one was permitted to know anything about! Under Walter Ulbricht we had a two billion Mark debt to the west. Under Honecker, in six years, that grew to twenty billion Marks. 60% of this debt flowed straight into consumer consumption. We were even subsidizing the flower industry at the rate of 450 Marks a year, a piece of absolute insanity which I wanted to end. In this way we lost the necessary basis ever to repay the debt. ("Denn damit gingen die Grundlagen für die Rückzahlungen verloren.") But Honecker lived on credit. In 1976 Günter Mittag and I warned Honecker again that the German Democratic Republic would drifting towards ungovernability ("in Richtung der Unregierbarkeit"), if we increased the debt burden further. Honecker interpreted that as a stab in the back: Mittag capitulated."
Gerhard Schürer, interviewed for Focus Magazine in November 1999

=== Disagreements over deficit based economic management ===
There are suggestions that during the final years of the German Democratic Republic, Gerhard Schürer frequently found himself thwarted by the powerful economic secretary to the Party Central Committee, Günter Mittag. Schürer's own recollection, ten years after the wall came down, was that he and Mittag had originally been in agreement on important financial and economic matters. The underlying problem arose from differing interpretations of the policy called "unity of economic and social policy" ("Einheit von Wirtschafts- und Sozialpolitik") inaugurated in June 1971 under the leadership of Erich Honecker as an attempt to make the country economically self-financing through a return to a "micro-managing" approach to economic planning, focusing on growth sectors including electronics, plastic and chemicals. Ulbricht had been removed from power in May 1971 by Erich Honecker, whose interpretation of the policy incorporated massive borrowing, much of which was consciously applied not to increased investment but to increased consumption. It was Schürer's position that the rapid growth in borrowing was unsustainable and, in the longer term, a route to national bankruptcy. By 1989 Schürer probably felt he had the dubious satisfaction of having been proved right by events. In the shorter term, Schürer's eighteen-year wait on the candidate list for Politburo membership was, even by the standards of the time and place, a long one. When he raised the risk of national bankruptcy in Central Committee meetings, he was rewarded by being designated a "saboteur" by none other than Honecker himself. Under a government that was criticism averse, being accused of sabotage by the head of government and the head of state was a very serious matter.

=== Schürer report ===
On 30 October 1989, together with Ernst Höfner, Arno Donda and Alexander Schalck-Golodkowski, Gerhard Schürer presented an "Analysis of the Economic Condition of the German Democratic Republic, with conclusions" ("Analyse der ökonomischen Lage der DDR mit Schlußfolgerungen"). The report had been requested by the newly appointed Party Secretary Egon Krenz, for presentation to the Politburo. The analysis disclosed a catastrophic picture. The East German economy was over-indebted and had for years "been consuming itself" ("zehrt seit Jahren von der Substanz"). A far reaching economic reform programme was proposed, but in the view of the authors that would not be enough to avert looming national insolvency. The only remaining hope was massive additional loans from the German Federal Republic ("West Germany").

For the German Democratic Republic, the Schürer report was an important catalyst along what is sometimes presented as an unstoppable road toward reunification, which took place the next year, formally in October 1990. For Gerhard Schürer, on both sides of the Inner German border, it permanently raised the public profile of a man who, when appointed as head of the State Planning Commission back in 1965, might reasonably have hoped to end his career in circumstances of comfortable obscurity.

=== Régime change ===
On 7 November 1989 the government resigned. In January 1990 Gerhard Schürer was excluded from the ruling SED (party), which by this time was in the process of reinventing itself for a democratic future as the Party of Democratic Socialism ( Partei des Demokratischen Sozialismus / PDS). Accused of "Criminal abuse of trust" ("verbrecherischen Vertrauensmißbrauchs") he was arrested on 22 January 1990 and sent to spend the next three months in prison. In the event he was released after eighteen days and the East German prosecuting authorities called off their investigation in May 1990. He was never charged, but the two and a half weeks spent in cell number 108 of a Berlin "Investigation Prison" did not leave him entirely unmarked. Nevertheless, he was not ready nor, he later claimed, financially able to retire, and he took a succession of casual jobs that included gardening for neighbours, washing cars and care work with the elderly. Later he managed a tights and stocking factory in the Allgäu that was keen to expand into the newly open markets of central Europe. As time moved on, he was also more ready than most of its former leaders to talk to journalists about the German Democratic Republic, of which he could sometimes be critical.

== Awards and honours ==
- 1964 Patriotic Order of Merit in silver
- 1971 Patriotic Order of Merit in gold
- 1981 Order of Karl Marx
