= Ernst Höfner =

Ernst Höfner may refer to:

- Ernst Höfner (politician)
- Ernst Höfner (ice hockey)
