= Hermann von Stengel =

German politician (1837–1919)

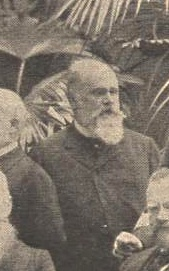
Stengel on 16 June 1900.

Hermann Guido Leopold Freiherr von Stengel (19 July 1837 – 5 May 1919) was a Bavarian administrator, a German politician and Finance Minister of the German Empire from 1903 to 1908.

== Early life ==
He was born in Speyer, Electorate of the Palatinate, on 19 July 1837, and baptized two days later. Hermann was the son of Carl Albert Leopold von Stengel and Julia Magdalena Catharina Franziska von Mayer.

== Political career ==
After studying law, he entered into the civil service of Bavaria. In 1874, he became government assessor in Würzburg. In 1881 he was made ministerial council, and as such authorized deputy of the Bundesrat in Berlin. He exercised this office until he was appointed State Council sixteen years later.

On 23 August 1903, he was appointed as a successor to Max Franz Guido von Thielmann as Finance Minister of the German empire. In the years that followed, there was a steady deterioration of the empire's finances that developed into a constant, structural crisis. The Fleet Acts of 1898 and 1900, employment of German troops during the Boxer Rebellion in China, the expansion of the army in 1893, 1899 and 1905 by as many as 613,000 men, and the increase in military pensions, all had to be financed.

Pressured by the increasing costs of armament, he developed a measure in 1906 that undermined the existing federal system, and instituted a country-wide inheritance tax, in addition to higher excise taxes. Yet the measures were not able to achieve the desired results, so the German empire's debt of 3 billion marks in 1904, grew to 4 billion in 1908 (equivalent to 21 billion and 25 billion 2021 euros). On 20 February 1908, he was replaced as Finance Minister by Reinhold Sydow.

== Publications ==
- (in German) Die Grundentlastung in Bayern, Würzburg, 1874

== Orders and decorations ==
- Mecklenburg: Grand Cross of the Order of the Griffon, 23 May 1906

== Literature ==
- (in German) Biographical data.
- Stürmer, Michael (1983). Die Deutschen und ihre Nation. Das ruhelose Reich – Deutschland 1866–1918 (in German). Kornwestheim. ISBN 3886800512.
- Witt, P. C. (1970). Die Finanzpolitik des Deutschen Reiches von 1903 bis 1913. Eine Studie zur Innenpolitik des Wilhelminischen Deutschland (in German). Lübeck.

Political offices
Preceded by Max Franz Guido von Thielmann	Finance Minister of Germany; 1903–1908	Succeeded by Reinhold Sydow
