= Erich Apel =

German WW2 Rocket engineer

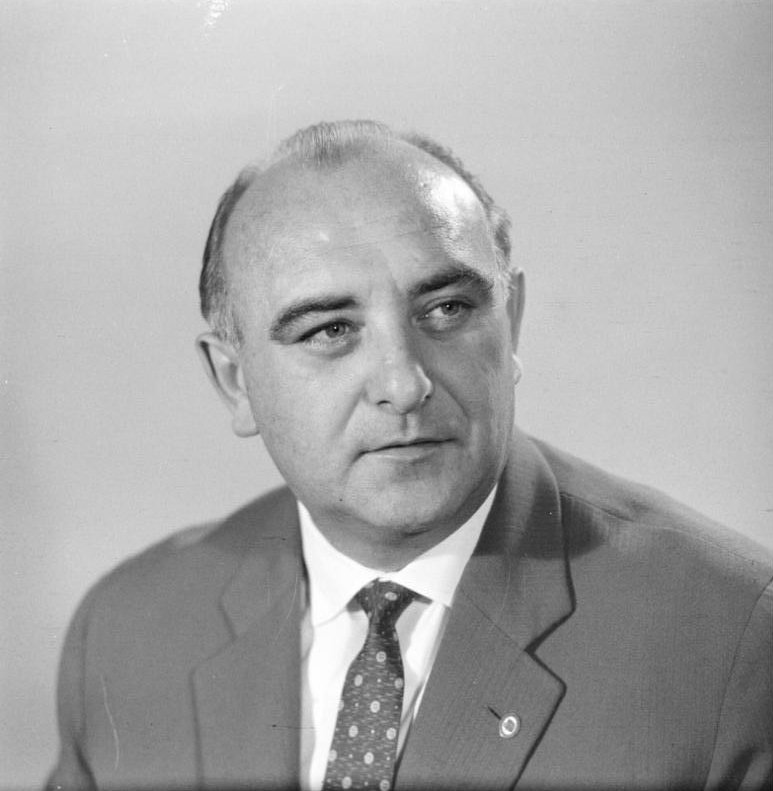
- Apel in 1963

Chairman of the State Planning Commission
- In office 12 January 1963 – 3 December 1965
- Chairman of the Council of Ministers: Otto Grotewohl
- First Deputy: See list: Rudolf Müller; Karl Grünheid; Gerhard Schürer
- Preceded by: Karl Mewis
- Succeeded by: Gerhard Schürer

Minister without portfolio
- In office 4 July 1962 – 12 January 1963 Serving with Gerhard Grüneberg
- Chairman of the Council of Ministers: Otto Grotewohl
- Preceded by: Position established
- Succeeded by: Position abolished

Secretary for the Economy of the Central Committee Secretariat of the Socialist Unity Party
- In office 16 July 1958 – 28 June 1962
- First Secretary: Walter Ulbricht
- Preceded by: Gerhart Ziller
- Succeeded by: Günter Mittag

Minister for Heavy Engineering
- In office 15 April 1955 – 15 February 1958
- Minister-President: Otto Grotewohl
- Preceded by: Gerhart Ziller
- Succeeded by: Gerhard Zimmermann (1965)

Member of the Volkskammer
- In office 16 November 1958 – 3 December 1965
- Preceded by: multi-member district
- Succeeded by: Margitta Stopp (1966)

Personal details
- Born: Erich Hans Apel; 3 October 1917 Judenbach, Saxe-Meiningen, German Empire (now Thuringia, Germany)
- Died: 3 December 1965 (aged 48) East Berlin, East Germany
- Party: Socialist Unity Party (1946–1965)
- Other political affiliations: Social Democratic Party (1946)
- Spouse: Christa Metzner (m. 1951)
- Children: 1
- Occupation: Politician; Civil Servant; Engineer
- Known for: his apparent suicide
- Awards: Patriotic Order of Merit; Banner of Labor
- Central institution membership: 1961–1965: Candidate member, Politburo of the Central Committee; 1960–1965: Full member, Central Committee; 1958–1960: Candidate member, Central Committee; Other offices held: 1963–1965: Deputy Chairman, Council of Ministers

Erich Apel (3 October 1917 – 3 December 1965) worked during World War Two as a rocket engineer at the Peenemünde Army Research Center in Nazi Germany. After his return from the Soviet Union, where he had forcibly worked for rocketry development under the Operation Osoaviakhim until 1952, he became an East German party official. During the later 1950s, he was increasingly involved in economic policy, serving from 1958 as head of the German Democratic Republic's Economics Commission in the Politburo. He was seen as a reformer. However, economic reform rapidly fell off the agenda after October 1964 when Nikita Khrushchev fell from power in Moscow.

Apel served as president of the state planning commission between 1963 and 1965. His final project was to negotiate a trade deal with the Soviet Union. However, hours before he was due to sign the resulting agreement on behalf of the East German government, he killed himself.

== Life ==
=== Early years ===
Erich Hans Apel was born in Judenbach, a small town in the Franconian Forest which had once benefited from its position as a staging post on a major trade route, but which had lost out commercially following the construction of a railway line providing a direct link from Leipzig to Nuremberg. Apel's father was a mechanical engineer: his mother worked in the garments industry. He attended school in nearby Sonneberg and Steinach, but left school in 1932 in order to embark on an apprenticeship at the Neuhaus porcelain factory in toolmaking and mechanical engineering. The ruling Nazi Party was popular in the region and in 1935 he joined the Deutsches Jungvolk youth organisation. However, it was found that the sixteen year old disrupted the "mind-numbingly dull drill exercises" ("der stumpfsinnige Drill"), and he was thrown out after nine months because of his "negative attitude" to the quasi-military exercises in which the boys were expected to participate. After completing his apprenticeship in 1935 he stayed on at the Neuhaus factory as a toolmaker and designer until 1937. Then, between 1937 and 1939, he attended the Engineering Academy at nearby Ilmenau, emerging with a degree in mechanical engineering.

=== War years ===
Directly after receiving his degree, in September 1939 Apel was conscripted into the army, becoming a member of Infantry Reserve Battalion 451, based in Gotha. Around this time World War II broke out. However, on 20 December 1939 Apel was ordered to the Weapons Agency's research facility at Peenemünde on Germany's northern coast. The head of the facility was the charismatic rocketry expert, Wernher von Braun. Apel seems to have been in his element. A contemporary later recalled that he worked from 07.30 until 17.30, like everyone else, but then in the evenings he retreated to his bedroom in a nearby hostel, in order to work on proposals for improvements. His speciality was the hydraulic systems for the rockets. He was tireless in his work of calculation, measuring and modelling. He seems to have made a good impression, since in August 1940 he was relieved of all further obligations regarding military service. In November 1940 he was appointed to the position of plant engineer and assistant to the facility director. He was totally uninterested in politics, never joining the party, and regarded by colleagues as a dedicated engineer, body and soul.

3 October 1942 was Apel's twenty-fifth birthday. Coincidentally, he was able to spend the day as a witness to the first launch anywhere in the world of a long-distance rocket, the so-called (at this stage) A4. The launch took place at 16.00 and everything worked perfectly, the rocket attaining a speed of Mach 4.5, a height of 85 kilometres (53 mi), and a horizontal distance of 190 kilometres (120 mi). At the start of 1943 Apel was promoted again, despite his young age becoming head of one of the many development departments at the Peenemünde army research facility. Shortly after this he mentioned to a group of colleagues what a wretched business it was that the thing should explode in the middle of a city. His boss, Walter Thiel, came to hear of the comment and called him aside, "Apel, you should have joined the medical service: you're too soft for the work here". However, there is no indication that Apel's comment adversely affected his career prospects: the researchers at Peenemünde saw themselves as an elite team engaged in vital work, and the only realistic alternative career path would have led him back to the military frontline.

During 1943 it became clear that the British knew about the research facility at Peenemünde. With their US allies they launched a succession of bombing raids to destroy it, starting in August 1943. Most of the 733 people killed at Peenemünde in the first bombing raid, on 17 August, were forced labourers, but the dead also included Apel's boss, Walter Thiel and his family. By that time, however, Apel himself was far away, transferred in April 1943 with his own team of assembly specialists and administrators to the Linke-Hofmann-Werke (LHW) plant in Breslau (as Wrocław was known) before 1945). Breslau was traditionally a centre for railway production and LHW was traditionally a manufacturer of railway locomotives and rolling stock, but during the war its sophisticated engineering capabilities were also being adapted to produce components and sub-assemblies for the rocket, which government propaganda was by now identifying as the "Vergeltungswaffe 2" ("Retribution weapon 2" / V-2). As the continuing bombing raids at the Peenemünde Army Research Center had their effect through 1943 and 1944, the LHW plant became the assembly location for the V-2 rockets. On 1 April 1944, at the request of the LHW management, Apel was released from his employment contract with the Army High Command Weapons Agency. He was now employed directly as chief engineer and assistant to the technical director at LHW.

By the end of 1944 the war was coming home to Germany. LHW now outsourced V-2 rocket production to a firm called "Peterbau GmbH" in Kleinbodungen near Nordhausen. With the assembly contract they sent Apel, who with effect from January 1945 became technical director of Peterbau GmbH. Apel's resolute determination to avoid politics now seemed to catch up with him, since the new location for rocket assembly was part of the vast underground factory at the Mittelbau-Dora concentration camp. Conditions were so dreadful that at least one commentator has suggested that the V-2 rockets found more victims among the slave labourers engaged in constructing the underground factory and in working on the rockets than among the citizens of London, the intended target of the finished rockets. Even if Apel had nothing to do with setting up and running the vast deadly forced labour infrastructure, as the engineer responsible for the rockets he was naturally associated with it. As Nazi Germany collapsed militarily and politically during the first part of 1945, Apel succeeded in getting back to his home village of Judenbach. Like millions of his compatriots he was determined to make a clean break with the past.

=== Soviet occupation zone ===
War ended, formally, in May 1945. The entire southern region of Germany had been liberated by the United States Army, but the victorious powers had already agreed a partition of the western two thirds of the country into four military occupation zones. After the Americans had withdrawn to their agreed positions Judenbach was included in the middle portion of Germany that would now be administered as the Soviet occupation zone. Initially Apel worked on the local farms. On 15 January 1946 he enrolled on the "New Teachers" programme. With millions of working age Germans dead or in prison of war camps, there was a desperate shortage of teachers, and the scheme, implemented with varying levels of effectiveness in the various occupation zones, was designed to select those appropriately educated individuals who were thought to be not excessively tainted by Nazi involvement, to undergo a rapid "re-education" and set to work educating school-age children. At the same time he both studied and taught, until 31 May 1946, at the Professional Business Academy in nearby Steinach.

In January 1946 Apel joined a political party, choosing the centre-left Social Democratic Party ("Sozialdemokratische Partei Deutschlands" / SPD). Four months later, the SPD merged with the Communist Party to form the new Socialist Unity Party ("Sozialistische Einheitspartei Deutschlands" / SED). The merger was presented as a way to prevent divisions on the political left from opening up opportunities for right wing populists to take control as had happened after 1932. In reality it never took effect except in the Soviet zone, where it received sustained practical backing from the military administration. The political development was not one for which Apel could muster much enthusiasm, and in common with many SPD members he was not one of those "volunteering" to sign his party membership over to the new party (though he was accepted as a member of the SED, eleven years later, in 1957).

=== Work in the Soviet Union ===
On 1 June 1946 Apel was "picked up" by the Soviet authorities. They showed no interest in his association with forced labour at the underground rocket factory at Mittelbau-Dora. But they were nevertheless interested in the factory; and they did make him an offer which, for a range of practical reasons, he was almost certainly in no position to refuse. The Soviets invited him to work with them as chief engineer and representative of the (former) factory management at the Soviet Technical Commission in the Bleicherode quarter of Nordhausen (which had also ended up in the Soviet zone), adjacent to the vast underground rocket plant.

Soviet interest in the German rocket programme was fully shared by the United States. During the chaotic closing weeks of the war Wernher von Braun had traveled to Nordhausen and met with Apel, offering to take him to America after the military defeat which by now everyone saw as inevitable. Von Braun was keen, as far as possible, to keep his full team with him. But his specialist in rocket hydraulics turned him down. Apel did not want to volunteer for further work in the weapons industry.

On 22 October 1946, across the Soviet occupation zone, in the early hours of the morning technicians and engineers from the rocket project were visited by Soviet officers, each accompanied by a translator. A brief instruction was read out: "By order of the Soviet Military Administration you must work for five years in the Soviet Union. You can take your wife and family with you, and as many of your personal effects as you wish ...". Till now Apel's working life had involved living in guest houses or barracks so he did not have many personal effects. Just hours after the order was given Apel and his colleagues were on the train heading east as part of Operation Osoaviakhim. The mood on the train was dark and apprehensive. The journey took around 14 days. Their ultimate destination was an island in the middle of Lake Seliger in a sparsely inhabited marshy region some 400 kilometres (250 mi) northwest of Moscow.

Before crossing to the island Apel was taken to Podlipki (today Korolyov) where he was reunited with a large quantity of heavy machinery and equipment that he had last seen in Germany during the closing weeks of the war. The German invasion of the Soviet Union in 1941 had forced the Soviets to build up an impressive expertise in deconstructing factories and their equipment, crating them up, and relocating them by train to places beyond the reach of the German army. After the war they had taken the opportunity to perfect their skills, crating up surviving German factories and their equipment, and taking them to the Soviet Union by way of war reparations. The 1937 Opel Kadett turned up in 1947 as the Soviet built Moskvitch 400. They had also applied their skill to the rocket facility in the mountain. The Red army had used 717 railway wagons to carry away 5,647 tonnes of machinery, munitions, and partially constructed rockets. By the end of 1946 a further 2,270 railway wagons had transported another 14,256 rocket construction plant, partially constructed rockets, and specialist machinery from the former Nazi facility in the Soviet occupation zone to a new rocket research facility in the Soviet Union. Secrecy was so complete that ten years later the world still believed that Soviet rocket programme was based on Soviet rocket science. The Americans had taken away only 400 tonnes of "rocket materials" from the Nordhausen facility. After inspecting the Soviet hoard, Apel joined his colleagues on the Island of Gorodomlya.

Keeping the German workers on an island helped enforce the secrecy, but the German experts nevertheless received wages twice as high as those of their Soviet counterparts. Apel became head of a testing department. Seventy years later a colleague from those times remembered him as "sociable, but also a little distant. Not so proletarian, and always a bit 'the boss'" (""Er war gesellig, aber auch ein bisschen distanziert. Nicht so proletenhaft, immer auch ein bisschen 'Der Chef'"). There was no attempt to integrate the Germans into the Soviet research teams. Stalin never intended that they should remain permanently. The idea was to "milk" their knowledge until their Soviet counterparts had absorbed all the necessary knowledge. That point was reached by the end of 1948, after which the Germans on the island were restricted to "theoretical" research. That suited Apel well enough. He had found a new wife, Christa Metzner, the daughter of a German aircraft engineer from the Arado aircraft plant, whom he married in Gorodomlya. Information on his first marriage remains in short supply: Christa Apel said later that she believed Erich had married an Austrian woman around 1942, but the first marriage had ended in divorce because Apel's war work meant he was almost always away. It was frequently indicated that during his six years in the Soviet Union Apel became a communist, but in his bones it seems reasonable to conclude that he remained a political agnostic.

=== German Democratic Republic ===
Apel returned on 2 June 1952. The Soviet occupation zone had been relaunched in October 1949 as the Soviet sponsored German Democratic Republic (East Germany). There was no call, in East Germany, for specialist expertise in weapons and rocketry. Other branches of heavy industry remained in place, however. Just four months after getting back, Apel was working as a chief engineer and department head at the East German Ministry for Machinery Construction. Promotion to a technical directorship followed in April 1953. In November 1953 he became a deputy minister in the department, working under Heinrich Rau.

He owed his rapid advancement in the new state to its leader, Walter Ulbricht. After years under military occupation which in many ways placed Soviet well-being ahead of German reconstruction, Ulbricht had narrowly survived the 1953 Uprising and was now keen to demonstrate that under Soviet sponsorship it was possible to create in East Germany a fully functioning socialist state. For that he needed technical experts and talented administrators. Apel was both. An important political ally and sponsor was Fritz Selbmann. After his six years in the Soviet Union, Apel (like Selbmann), was a convinced proponent of a "Planned economy". The choice was one between "Rationalty" (Vernunft) and "Chaos". It was already apparent that in West Germany free market capitalism was giving rise to far more rapid economic growth than anything happening in East Germany. The lesson to be drawn was that economic planning had to be undertaken competently and in microscopic detail by the government. Political leadership was needed.

In June 1954, already a junior government minister, Apel became a candidate for party membership. Membership was granted in March 1957. Slightly more than one year later, in July 1958, he became a candidate for Central Committee membership. In July 1960 Apel became one of approximately 112 members of the powerful Party Central Committee. Under the Leninist constitutional structure in place, the Central Committee exercised a far tighter degree of control than government ministers or the National Parliament (Volkskammer). It was therefore by most reckoning a promotion when on 6 February 1958 Apel resigned his ministerial position and accepted a position as head of the newly created Economic Commission of the Central Committee's Politburo. In 1958 he also became a member of the Volkskammer, in which capacity he chaired the Parliamentary Economic Committee.

The economic challenges facing East Germany were already formidable by 1960. The mandate Walter Ulbricht gave to the new Economic Commission was summed up in the mantra which the leader liked to repeat. East Germany should "overtake without catching up" ("überholen ohne einzuholen"). East Germans must be able to eat more butter and meat than West Germans. One day they must be able to travel in faster cars and live in better apartments. This must be accomplished without having to copy "capitalist production methods". Apel must make it happen, not "someday ... never", but by creating and following a plan. If it was a dream, it was a dream in which many comrades evidently believed. In July 1961 Apel was promoted to candidate membership of the politburo and secretaryship of the Central Committee. There were other appointments which combined to stress his importance in the wider government project. In 1960 he received a doctorate in return for a dissertation on the so-called East German Chemistry Programme.

The "Chemistry Programme" was a seven-year plan, launched in 1958 under the widely communicated motto "Chemistry gives us bread, welfare and beauty" ("Chemie gibt Brot, Wohlstand und Schönheit"), and designed to double chemicals production by 1965, making it the country's second largest industrial sector after mechanical engineering. The project was closely identified with Apel, whose intellectual brilliance marked him, and the project, out for success. But reality got in the way of the targets. Reparations extracted by the Soviets had bled the country of its capacity to rebuild and maintain the infrastructure necessary to support the East German government's economic aspirations. Cut off by international political rivalries from western and world markets, the nation continued to be dependent on deliveries of vital raw materials from the Soviet Union, and the partnership with the Soviets, even at the height of the Cold War, was far less fraternal than would have been assumed at the time in the west. Recently discovered documents indicate that even in 1959 Moscow agreed to deliver to the German Democratic Republic only around half the raw materials which the East German economic plan for 1960-62 called for. One solution was to try and select trading partners according to commercial criteria and not purely according to political dogma. The economic blockade dividing East Germany from the west was largely self-imposed: between 1962 and 1965 Apel was able to oversee a modest trend whereby the proportion of East Germany's foreign trade with west rose from 21% to 25% of the total. But more than half of the country's trade was reported in 1965 to be with the Soviet Union, conducted on terms favourable to Moscow and disadvantageous to East Germany, applying set prices that were well below "world market prices", both for exports and for imports.

In 1964 Otto Grotewohl and Willi Stoph took over as Chairman of the Council of Ministers. At the time there were some who saw Stoph as Walter Ulbricht's heir apparent. A level of rivalry within the Party Central Committee was normal, but between Apel and Stoph there quickly emerged a particularly intense mutual antagonism. To the extent that both men were responsible for delivering a better future for the people there was an inherent overlap between their public profiles. Stoph never missed a chance to highlight a failure to meet planned objectives or to criticise Apel's actions and utterances. Pressure also increased from Moscow where Nikita Khrushchev fell from power in October 1964. Leonid Brezhnev, the new party secretary in Moscow, condemned his predecessor's "failures of economic leadership". There were a number of rapid practical changes. Soviet wheat deliveries to East Germany planned for 1966 were cut back to 400,000 tonnes, a third of the annual quantity in existing plans. Within the East German leadership Apel had always been able to count on backing for his reforms from Walter Ulbricht, but the changes in Moscow meant that Ulbricht's driving priority was now to secure his own position. Back in January 1963 Ulbricht had stunned colleagues, under the influence of Apel, announcing a 180-degree reversal on economic policy. "We need economics to trump politics" ( "Wir brauchen ein Primat der Ökonomie über die Politik!"). There was talk of revitalising the market and allowing private trade - subject to a restrictive framework - and of moving society away from a semi-military footing towards a civil one. That had been in 1963, before the fall of Khrushchev. But now the leader was ready for another 180 degree reversal over economic policy.

=== Death ===
On 3 December 1965 Apel was due to sign a new economic agreement with the Soviet Union covering the period 1966–1970. Earlier that year he had traveled to Moscow with Walter Ulbricht to finalise the terms. Apel was not in favour of signing the agreement that the comrades in Moscow had imposed, but he had been opposed by Alfred Neumann, Chairman of the People's Economic Council and a Moscow loyalist. More importantly, he had been over-ruled by Walter Ulbricht. Early that morning the telephone rang in Apel's office at the ministry in East Berlin. Willi Stoph wanted a word. There was no reply. Apel, while seated at his desk, had taken his own life. A 7.65 mm bullet from his service pistol lay at his feet. The East German signature on the trade deal with the Soviets would be that of Alfred Neumann. News of Apel's death was held back until after the Soviet signatory, Trade Minister Nikolai Patolichev had left town, later that day.

There were those who believed Apel had been murdered, in the context of an increasingly intense power struggle between Politburo members as Walter Ulbricht's period in power was seen to be coming to an end. Ulbricht himself ordered the Ministry for State Security to investigate Apel's death, though later commentators found the aspects of the investigation "uncharacteristically sloppy". On the other hand, West Berlin's mayor, Willy Brandt was never in doubt that Apel's death had been a suicide, performed in protest over the Soviet Union's continuing exploitation of East Germany. Brandt reacted with a cryptic prophesy: "He did not die quietly. We will all hear from him again, from what it was that made him do it." ("Er ist nicht schweigend gestorben. Wir alle werden noch von ihm hören, von dem, was ihn bewegte").

== Awards and honours ==
- 1959 Patriotic Order of Merit in Silver
- 1963 Banner of Labor
- 1964 Patriotic Order of Merit in Gold

== Publications (selection) ==
- Durch sozialistische Rekonstruktion und Erhöhung der Arbeitsproduktivität zur Erfüllung des Siebenjahrplans, Berlin 1959
- Das Chemieprogramm der Deutschen Demokratischen Republik. Ein wichtiger Faktor im ökonomischen Wettbewerb zwischen Sozialismus und Kapitalismus, Berlin 1960
- Aktuelle Aufgaben zur Erhöhung der Qualität der Leitung der Volkswirtschaft durch die Verbesserung der komplexen Planung, insbesondere durch die Beachtung der Wechselwirkung zwischen Organisation und Technik und die Ausarbeitung der Pläne „Neue Technik“, Berlin 1961
- Neue Fragen der Planung. Zur Rolle und zu den Aufgaben der zentralen staatlichen Planung im neuen ökonomischen System der Planung und Leitung der Volkswirtschaft, Berlin 1963
- Aktuelle Fragen der ökonomischen Forschung, Berlin 1964
- with Günter Mittag: Wissenschaftliche Führungstätigkeit – neue Rolle der VVB, Berlin 1964
- with Günter Mittag: Ökonomische Gesetze des Sozialismus und neues ökonomisches System der Planung und Leitung der Volkswirtschaft, Berlin 1964
- with Günter Mittag: Planmässige Wirtschaftsführung und ökonomische Hebel, Berlin 1964
- with Günter Mittag: Fragen der Anwendung des neuen ökonomischen Systems der Planung und Leitung der Volkswirtschaft bei der Vorbereitung und Durchführung der Investitionen, Berlin 1965
