= Siegfried Böhm =

East German finance minister (1928–1980)

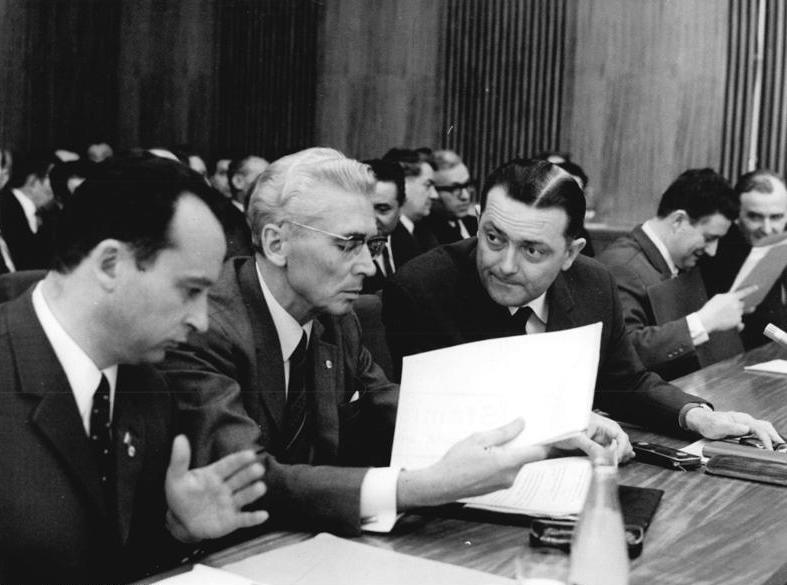

Minister of Finance
- In office 12 December 1966 – 5 May 1980
- Chairman of the Council of Ministers: Willi Stoph; Horst Sindermann; Willi Stoph
- Preceded by: Willy Rumpf
- Succeeded by: Werner Schmieder

Head of the Planning and Finance Department of the Central Committee
- In office 1963–1966
- Secretary: Günter Mittag
- Deputy: Karl Hengst
- Preceded by: Gerhard Schürer
- Succeeded by: Karl Hengst

Personal details
- Born: 20 August 1928 Plauen, Saxony, Weimar Republic (now Germany)
- Died: 4 May 1980 (aged 51) Berlin-Karlshorst, East Germany
- Party: Socialist Unity Party (1948–1980)
- Education: Karl Marx University
- Awards: Patriotic Order of Merit
- Central institution membership: 1967–1980: Full member, Central Committee; Other offices held: 1961–1963: Deputy Head, Planning and Finance Department of the Central Committee

Siegfried Böhm (20 August 1928 – 4 May 1980) was an East German politician and long-term finance minister of East Germany. He was in office for nearly fourteen years between 1966 and 1980.

== Biography ==
Böhm was born in Plauen on 20 August 1928. He received a degree in economics.

Böhm was appointed the finance minister in December 1966, succeeding Willy Rumpf in the post. Böhm's term lasted until 1980. He was among the central committee members of the Socialist Unity Party of Germany. He was also a member of the Working Group Balance of Payments from 1974 to 1980. Böhm was one of the first officials who alerted the East German authorities about the negative consequences of the indebtedness to the Western countries. He also criticized the illegal currency and gold transactions carried out in the country.

Böhm died at his home in Berlin-Karlshorst on 4 May 1980. The East German officials reported on the next day that his wife shot him during a quarrel and then she committed suicide. The official paper Neues Deutschland argued that Böhm and his wife died in an accident without giving any further details about the incident. One week later their children issued an obituary in a state-controlled paper.

Böhm was buried in a state ceremony. He was succeeded by Werner Schmieder as finance minister in June 1980.

It was revealed in 2003 as a result of the investigations that Böhm was in fact killed by an East German hit squad due to his potential reports about the bankruptcy faced in East Germany. His wife was also murdered by the squad to fabricate the official story of his death.

Political offices
Preceded by Willy Rumpf	Finance Minister of East Germany; 1966–1980	Succeeded by Werner Schmieder
