= Alexander Schalck-Golodkowski =

East German politician (1932–2015)

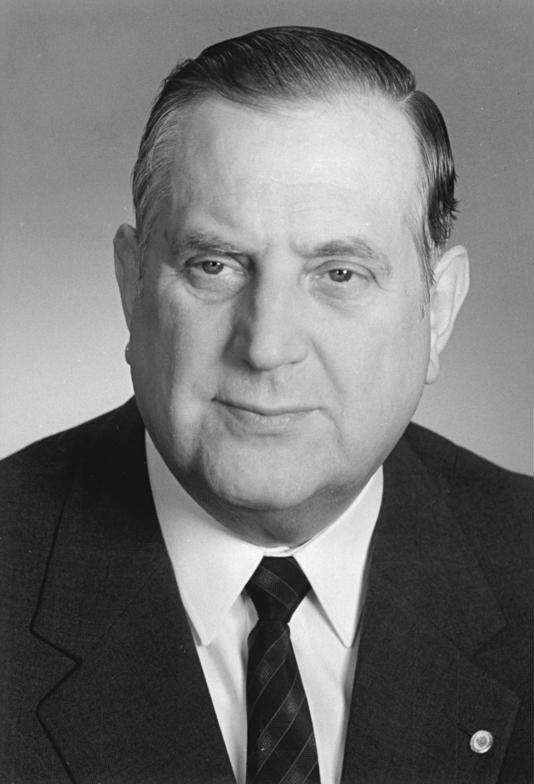
- Schalck-Golodkowski in 1988

Head of the KoKo State Secretary in the Ministry for Foreign Trade (Note: "Deputy Minister for Foreign Trade" from 1967 until 1975)
- In office 7 December 1966 – 6 December 1989
- Minister: Horst Sölle; Gerhard Beil
- Deputy: Horst Roigk; Manfred Seidel
- Preceded by: Horst Roigk
- Succeeded by: Karl-Heinz Gerstenberger (acting)

Personal details
- Born: 3 July 1932 Treptow, Berlin, Free State of Prussia, Weimar Republic (now Germany)
- Died: 21 June 2015 (aged 82) Rottach-Egern, Bavaria, Germany
- Party: Socialist Unity Party (1955–1989)
- Spouses: Margareta Becker (m. 1955; div. 1975) Sigrid Gutmann (m. 1976)
- Children: 2
- Education: Hochschule für Außenhandel; Juristische Hochschule des MfS
- Occupation: Politician; Civil Servant; Businessman; Precision Mechanic
- Awards: Patriotic Order of Merit, 1st class; Order of Karl Marx; Medal Brotherhood in Arms; Star of People's Friendship
- Central institution membership: 1986–1989: Full member, Central Committee; Other offices held: 1962–1966: First Secretary, Socialist Unity Party in the Ministry for Foreign Trade

Alexander Schalck-Golodkowski (3 July 1932 – 21 June 2015) was a politician and trader in the German Democratic Republic. He was director of a main department ('Hauptverwaltungsleiter') in the Ministry for Foreign Trade and German Domestic Trade (1956–62), the Deputy Minister for External Trade (1967–75), and head of the GDR's Kommerzielle Koordinierung (KoKo, 1966–86).

== Early life ==
He was born in Berlin to a stateless ethnic Russian father and adopted by the Schalcks when he was eight years old. His biological father served as a Tsarist officer in World War I and became the head of the Wehrmacht's Russian language interpreter school in World War II; he did not return from Soviet captivity. His maternal grandfather worked for Stinnes in St. Petersburg.

Schalck-Golodkowsky joined the Free German Youth in 1951 and the Socialist Unity Party of Germany (Sozialistische Einheitspartei Deutschlands, SED) in 1955.

== Career in East Germany ==
In 1966 he was appointed head of KoKo (at that time a newly formed department of the Ministry for Foreign Trade, ten years later it would formally become a powerful independent government agency in its own right) and in 1967 was also appointed a special officer of the Ministry of State Security. He concurrently held the rank of Deputy Minister for Foreign Trade until 1975, when he was promoted to State Secretary (in the GDR, Deputy Minister was ranked lower than a State Secretary), but was only nominally responsible to the Minister. In reality, he only answered to Erich Honecker, Günter Mittag and Erich Mielke.

In 1983 he led the negotiations with Bavarian leader Franz Josef Strauß to obtain a billion Deutschmarks loan from the West German government.

He was appointed to the central committee of the SED in 1986 and, under suspicion of misusing his powers at KoKo he fled to West Berlin in December 1989. He was briefly imprisoned before settling in Bavaria.

== Post-reunification activities ==
Following reunification, the actions of KoKo and of Schalck-Golodkowski head were investigated on suspicions of espionage activities, tax evasion, fraud, breaking embargo regulations and offences against Allied military law. He was prosecuted in 1996 for breaking Allied law and sentenced to a year's probation; other charges were withdrawn due to his ill-health—he had operations to remove cancers in 1987 and 1997.

He had been married twice and had two children.

== See also ==
- Heinrich Rau
