= Heinz Rauch =

German politician (1914–1962)

Heinz Rauch (23 November 1914 - 19 December 1962) was a German activist and politician (KPD, SED) who fought against the fascists in the Spanish Civil War.

After 1945 he embarked on a career as a party official in what became East Germany. In 1951 he was appointed to a consultancy position with the national statistical office. In February 1957 he took over as head of the East German statistical service, retaining the post till his death in an air crash not quite six years later. His wife Märta and two of the couple's three sons, Kurt and Bernd, were also killed.

== Life ==
Heinz Rauch was born into a working-class family in Schönefeld (Leipzig). His first full-time job, between 1929 and 1932, was as a clerk with the Dresdner Bank. In 1933 he joined the Communist Party in his home city of Leipzig. 1933 was also the year in which the Hitler government took power and lost little time in transforming Germany into a one-party dictatorship: one effect of that was that at around the same time that Rauch joined the party, his membership of it became illegal. In July 1933 he emigrated via Denmark to Sweden, where he remained till 1936. In August 1934, as the result of a highly publicised extradition application, Rauch came into contact with the well-known Swedish lawyer-politician (and son of the former "statsminister" - loosely, "prime minister" Hjalmar Branting), Georg Branting (1887–1965). A set-back came in November 1934, however, when Rauch was arrested.

Rauch's detention was relatively brief, since during 1935/36 he was working as a toolmaker in Stockholm. In the summer of 1936 he travelled with Rudi Müller to Spain where civil war was breaking out. Their purpose was to participate in the anticipated fighting as members of the communist inspired International Brigades. He fought initially as a member of the 14th Brigade and then with the 11th Brigade. He attended the internationalists' Pozo Rubio officers' training school at Albacete. Subsequently he was badly wounded and appointed to the rank of lieutenant. At around the same time he was accepted for membership of the Spanish Communist Party. In or shortly before 1938 Rauch also undertook an engineering traineeship.

Later in 1938 he returned to Sweden. In 1940 he became a member of the leadership team of the exiled German Communist Party. It was also in 1940 that Heinz Rauch married the Swedish communist, Märta Jansson (1919 – 1962). In July 1940 Rauch was sent by the party to Norway where for several months he engaged in "illegal political work" among German soldiers stationed there. His stay in Norway was cut short, however, following intervention by the Communist Party of Norway which at this point was desperately keen to avoid becoming involved in any confrontation with the German occupation forces. On 5 July 1941, accompanied by Franz Stephany, he was sent back to Norway in order to make contact with the (by this time illegal) Central Committee of the Communist Party in Oslo. They stayed for several days before Rauch slipped quietly across the border back into Sweden. Back in Berlin Heinz Rauch's continuing political involvement during his Swedish exile had not gone unnoticed, and on 2 March 1942 he was formally stripped of his German citizenship. Although Rauch managed to remain below the radar during most of his time in Sweden, there is little doubt that he remained politically active till the war ended. One source points to powerful, albeit circumstantial evidence that the purpose of Rauch's visit to Norway at the start of July 1941 had been to meet up with Asbjørn Sunde and "activate" the sustained sabotage operation that now emerged in occupied Norway. In 1944 Rauch was a delegate to the party conference held in Sweden by the German Communist Party in exile.

Heinz Rauch returned to the region administered as the Soviet occupation zone in Germany via Danzig with other activist comrades who had spent the war in Sweden, including Georg Henke, Josef Miller, Wolfgang Steinitz and Paul Verner. The men arrived at the Stettiner Bahnhof (as the "Nordbahnhof" was then known) on the north side of central Berlin on 19 January 1946. The military authorities agreed that Rauch should be permitted to return to his Saxon homeland, where for a couple of months, till March 1946, he attended the "Fritz Heckert" party academy at Ottendorf. The next month he took part in the party conference in Berlin which implemented the contentious merger between the Communist party and the Social Democratic Party, resulting in the creation of the Socialist Unity Party (Sozialistische Einheitspartei Deutschlands / SED). The stated purpose of the party merger, which in the event took effect only in Germany's Soviet occupation zone, was to avoid a return to power of a nationalist-populist government (as had happened in 1933), facilitated by divisions on the political left. Heinz Rauch was one of hundreds of thousands of Communist Party members in the Soviet zone who lost no time in signing their Communist Party membership over to the new party. Still in Saxony, during 1946/47 he served as Party Secretary in Bautzen and as a member of the regional party executive ("Bezirksvorstand") for East Saxony (as the Dresden region was identified at the time). A further practical indication that Rauch had found favour with the military authorities and party establishment came in 1947/48, during which time he served as head of the Soviet News and Information Service for East Saxony.

It was also during 1948 that his wife and the couple's (at this stage two) children relocated from Sweden to join him, reuniting the young family in the Soviet occupation zone. Märta took a job in the foreign trade sector. In 1947 Rauch became a member of the Vereinigung der Verfolgten des Naziregimes (VVN / "Union of Persecutees of the Nazi Regime"). Between 1948 and 1950 Rauch worked as the head of the Agitation section with the national leadership committee of the "Freier Deutsche Gewerkschaftsbund" (FDGB / "Free [East] German [National] Trade Union Federation". It was during this period, in October 1949, that the Soviet occupation zone was formally relaunched as the Soviet sponsored German Democratic Republic (East Germany).

In November 1950 Rauch accepted a position as senior press officer ("Pressereferent") with the East German Ministry of Labour. In February 1951 he was installed as chairman of a government audit commission. Also in 1951 he took a consultancy position with the national statistical office: in January 1952 he became first deputy head. Between 1953 and 1955 he undertook a correspondence course with the "Karl Marx" Party Academy in Berlin. Clearly marked out for further party-political advancement, between September 1956 and September 1957 Rauch was in Moscow, attending the Party academy of the Soviet Communist Party Central Committee. On his return from Moscow, in October 1957 Heinz Rauch succeeded Fritz Behrens as head of the East German statistical service. On 19 July 1958 Rauch was appointed to membership of the important National Planning Commission, then under the chairmanship of Bruno Leuschner. On 4 July 1962 he was also appointed to the Ministerial Council.

Among his other appointments, Heinz Rauch was made a member of the party's National Audit Commission ("Zentralen Revisionskommission der SED") at the fourth party congress in April 1954.

Heinz Rauch's work conferred significant and (in East Germany) highly unusual international travel privileges, which evidently extended to family members. On 19 December 1962 Rauch and his wife Märta, along with two of their sons, were passengers on the second leg of a LOT flight from Brussels to Warsaw, which had touched down in Berlin for a mid-way stop. On the final approach to Warsaw the Vickers Viscount 804 crashed slightly more than a kilometer short of the runway and burst into flames. There were no survivors among the 28 passengers and 5 crew members. Heinz and Märta Rauch were survived by their youngest son, Lars Rauch. Agnes Rauch, the mother of Heinz Rauch, was also still alive at the time of his death.

Following the accident, during the early afternoon of 28 December 1962, the Party Central Committee and the Ministerial Council held a high-profile celebration ceremony ("Trauerakt") for Rauch and his recently deceased family members at Berlin's Baumschulenweg Crematorium.
