= Willy Rumpf =

German politician (1903–1982)

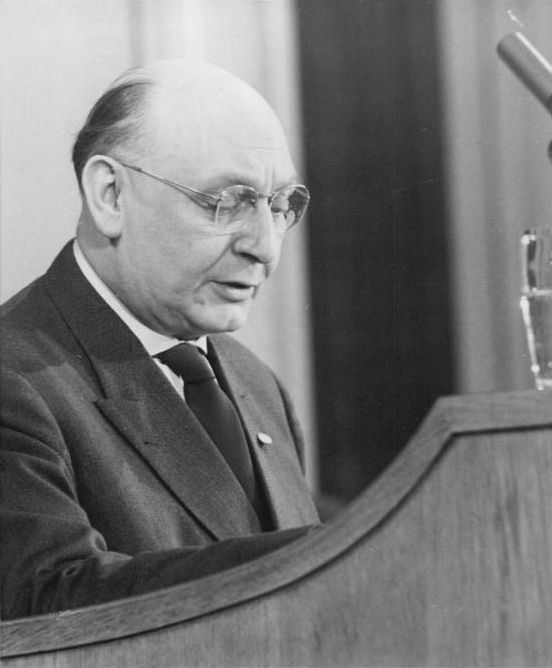
- Rumpf in 1962

Finance Minister of the German Democratic Republic
- In office 1955–1956
- Preceded by: Hans Loch
- Succeeded by: Siegfried Böhm

Member of the Volkskammer
- In office 1949–1967

Personal details
- Born: April 4, 1903 Berlin, German Empire
- Died: February 8, 1982 (aged 78) East Berlin, German Democratic Republic
- Party: Socialist Unity Party of Germany (1946-); Communist Party of Germany (1925-1946)
- Spouse: Ella Rumpf
- Awards: Star of People's Friendship (1978); Hero of Labour (1973); Patriotic Order of Merit, Honor clasp, in Gold (1968); Banner of Labor (1965); Order of Karl Marx (1963); Patriotic Order of Merit, in Gold (1958); Patriotic Order of Merit, in Silver (1955)

Willy Rumpf (4 April 1903 – 8 February 1982) was a German communist politician and Finance Minister in the German Democratic Republic.

Rumpf was born in Berlin. During 1917–1920, he was educated as an insurance assessor, and worked until 1932 as an accountant, cashier and a foreign trade correspondent. In 1920 he joined the German Communist Youth Association, and in 1925 the Communist Party of Germany. From 1933 to 1938, he was arrested in penitentiary and detained at the Sachsenhausen concentration camp. After that he returned to work, and was a member of the resistance group Robert Uhrig. During 1944–1945, he was again in custody.

From 1945 to 1947 he was deputy leader of the finance department of the magistrate of greater Berlin, from 1947 to 1948 leader of the trust administration of Berlin, from 1948 to 1949 leader of the central administration for finances of the German Economic Commission.

In 1946. Rumpf became a member of the Socialist Unity Party of Germany (SED). During 1949–1967, he was a delegate of the Volkskammer, from 1950 as a candidate and from 1963 as a member of the central committee of the SED. He was from 1955 to 1966 Finance Minister and member of the cabinet council, and from 1963 its president.

Rumpf received the Order of Merit for the Fatherland in 1958, in 1963 the Order of Karl Marx, and in 1978 the Star of Friendship of Nations.

Political offices
Preceded by Hans Loch	Finance Minister of East Germany; 1955–1966	Succeeded by Siegfried Böhm
