= Uta Nickel =

East German finance minister and economist (born 1941)

Minister of Finance and Prize
- In office 18 November 1989 – 12 April 1990
- Prime Minister: Hans Modrow
- Preceded by: Ernst Höfner
- Succeeded by: Walter Siegert (acting)

Personal details
- Born: 19 July 1941 (age 84) Leipzig, Germany
- Party: Socialist Unity Party

Uta Nickel (born 19 July 1941) is a German economist and one of the former finance ministers of East Germany.

== Early life and education ==
Nickel was born in Leipzig on 19 July 1941. She studied economics.

== Career ==
Nickel joined the ruling party of East Germany, Socialist Unity, in 1960. She served as the councillor of finance of Leipzig in the period between 1963 and 1976. She was state secretary for finances and prices from 1988 to 1989. She was appointed minister of finance and prices on 18 November 1989, replacing Ernst Höfner in the post. She was part of the reform-minded cabinet formed by Hans Modrow.

She resigned from the office in January 1990 following the allegations that she was involved in illegal payments. Upon these accusations, she was investigated by the prosecutor general for financial breach of trust. Nickel denied any wrongdoing. Nickel's term officially ended on 12 April 1990 when Walter Siegert was appointed as acting finance minister.

After retiring from politics Nickel worked as a consultant for two property development companies based in Cologne.
