= 1962 LOT Vickers Viscount Warsaw crash =

1962 plane crash in Poland

Coordinates: 52°9′57″N 20°58′2″E

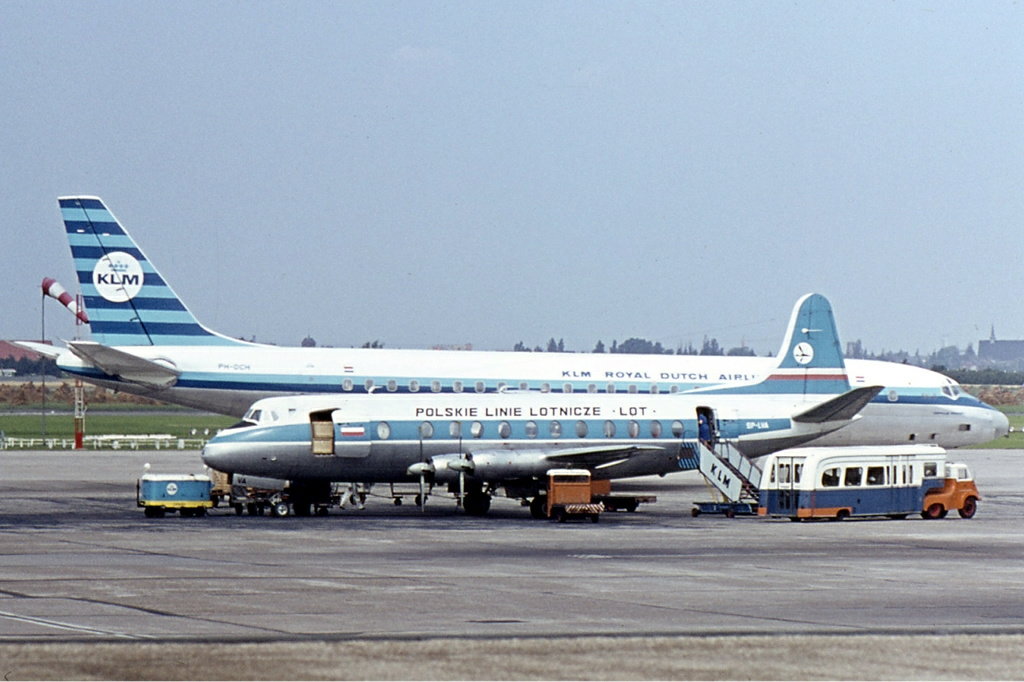
- A LOT Vickers Viscount, similar to the one involved

Accident
- Date: 19 December 1962
- Summary: Loss of control on approach
- Site: near Warszawa-Okecie Airport (WAW/EPWA)

Aircraft
- Aircraft type: Vickers 804 Viscount
- Operator: LOT Polskie Linie Lotnicze
- Registration: SP-LVB
- Flight origin: Brussels Airport (IATA: BRU, ICAO: EBBR)
- Stopover: Berlin-Schönefeld Airport (SXF/EDDB)
- Destination: Warszawa-Okecie Airport (WAW/EPWA)
- Occupants: 33
- Passengers: 28
- Crew: 5
- Fatalities: 33
- Survivors: 0

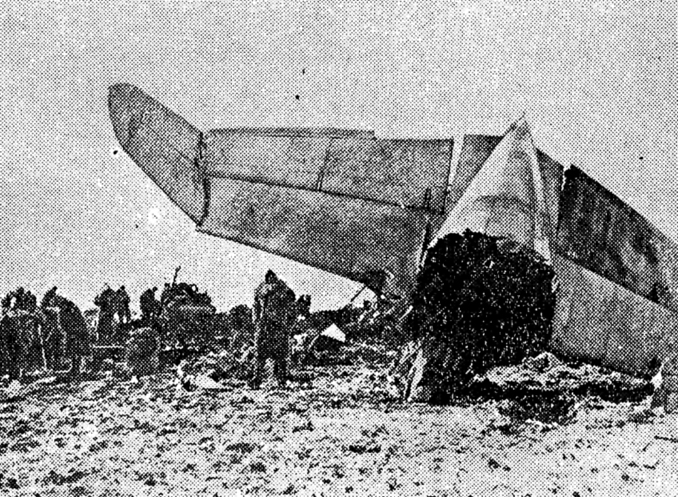
Wreckage of the aircraft

The 1962 LOT Vickers Viscount Warsaw crash occurred on 19 December 1962 when a Vickers Viscount 804, operated by LOT Polish Airlines on a flight from Brussels to Warsaw, crashed on landing. All 33 passengers and crew died.

== Accident ==
The plane was returning from Brussels and had a stopover in Berlin, from where it took off at 5:55 pm. While on approach on runway 33 in Warsaw at 7:30 pm the crew received landing clearance. 46 seconds later the plane crashed and burned 1335 meters from the threshold.

All 33 people aboard died – the crew of five and 28 passengers. Among the victims was Heinz Rauch, head of the East German statistical service, along with his wife and two children.

== Investigation ==
The Chief Committee of Aircraft Accident Investigation stated that at the time of the accident the plane was configured for landing (flaps set and landing gear lowered). It also stated there was no explosion mid-air and all damage was a result of the crash. The plane was landing in harsh winter weather conditions, with dense near-ground fog, 6/8 overcast, fractostratus clouds at 250 meters, 7 km visibility and a temperature of −5 °C.

=== Causes ===
One of the probable causes of the stalling due to low speed was attributed to turboprop engine features, which change the propellers pitch during acceleration. As such, sudden throttle increase is not recommended. Such a maneuver was likely executed by the captain, who was accustomed to flying piston engine aircraft in which such maneuvers are allowed. The Vickers Viscount 804 was one of three recently bought from British United Airways in England. On LOT's roster the airliner had logged only 84 flight hours.

Official accident causes:

1. Crew error
2. Crew training errors

There is a possibility that one of the NDBs during approach was broken, unknown to the crew.
