= Gerhart Ziller =

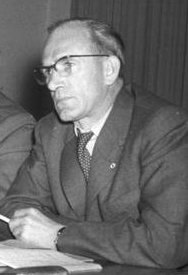
Gerhart Ziller, 1957

Paul Gerhart (Gert) Ziller (April 19, 1912 in Dresden – December 14, 1957 in East Berlin) was a German Communist, antifascist resistance fighter and politician. He initially served as a minister in the state of Saxony and later held various ministries in the GDR.

== Life ==
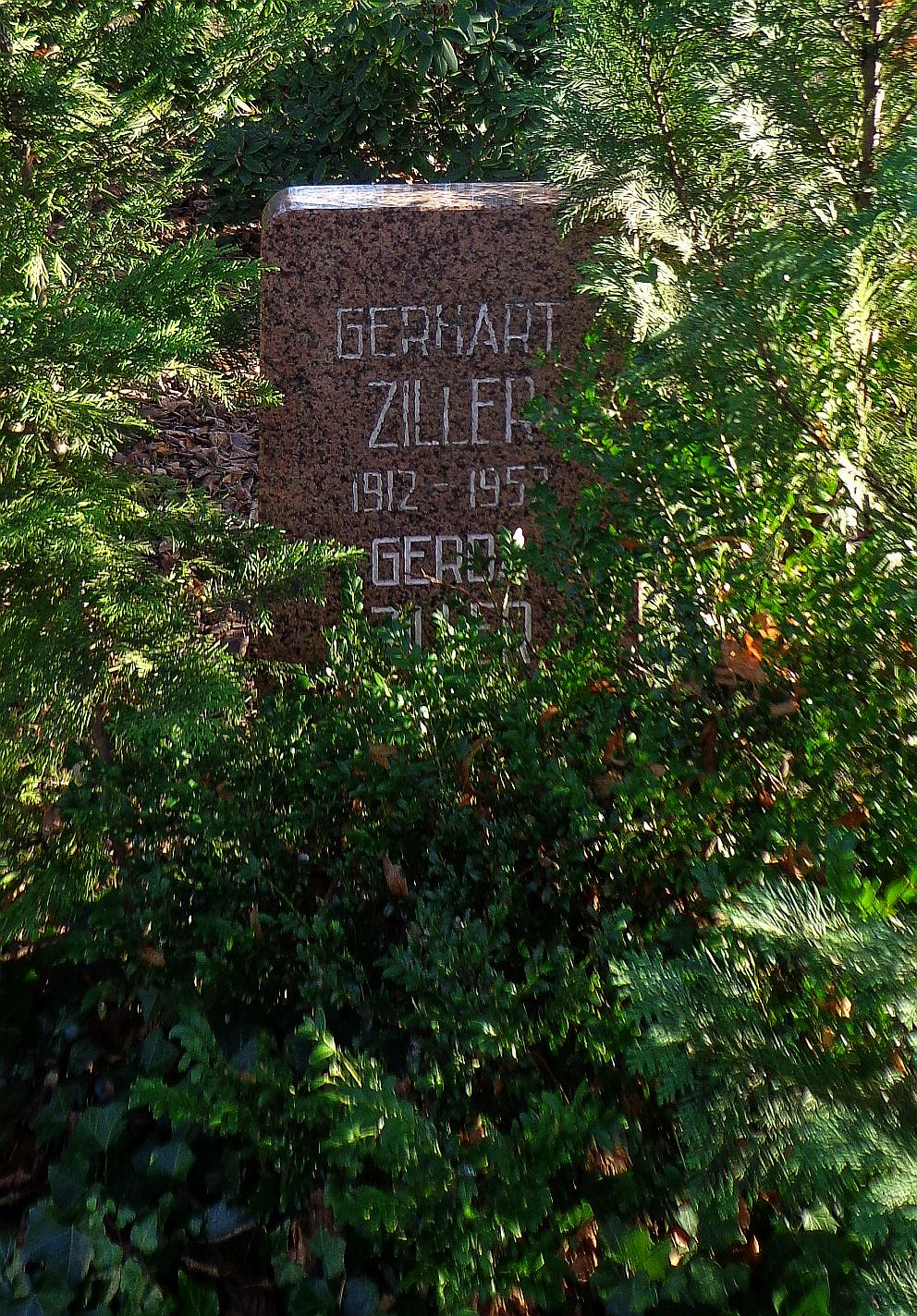
Grave in Berlin

As the son of a machinist, Ziller trained as an electrical fitter and technical draftsman after attending elementary school, and later pursued evening studies to become an electrical engineer. He joined the Young Communist League of Germany in 1927 and the KPD in 1930. From 1930 to 1933, he was an editor for the KPD newspaper Arbeiterstimme. After 1933, he worked as a technical draftsman and mechanical engineer. Due to his illegal activities (including being a member of the resistance group around Anton Saefkow), he was imprisoned multiple times, including in the concentration camp Sachsenhausen and in the Leipzig prison in 1944–45.

In 1945, he became the "People's Commissioner for Culture" in Meissen in the Antifa-Ausschuss, which was established immediately after the end of the war. From August 1945, he was a Ministerial Council member and head of the department for coal, fuel, and energy in the regional administration. Until 1948, he was an undersecretary and head of the department for fuel energy and energy economics at the Ministry of Economics, and until 1949, he was Deputy Minister. From April 1949, he was the Minister for Industry and Transportation in the state of Saxony.

From November 1950 to February 1953, he was the Minister for Mechanical Engineering, and from February 1953 to January 1954, he was the Minister for Heavy Machine Building in the GDR. From July 1953, he was a member and secretary for economic policy of the Central Committee of the SED, and from August 1953, a member of the People's Chamber.

After disagreements with Walter Ulbricht over economic policy and his leadership style in the party, Ziller committed suicide on December 14, 1957. His ashes were interred in the Pergolenweg memorial area at the Central Cemetery Friedrichsfelde in Berlin.

In February 1958, Ziller was posthumously accused of belonging to the "anti-party group Schirdewan, Wollweber, and others."
