= Günter Mittag =

German politician (1926–1994)

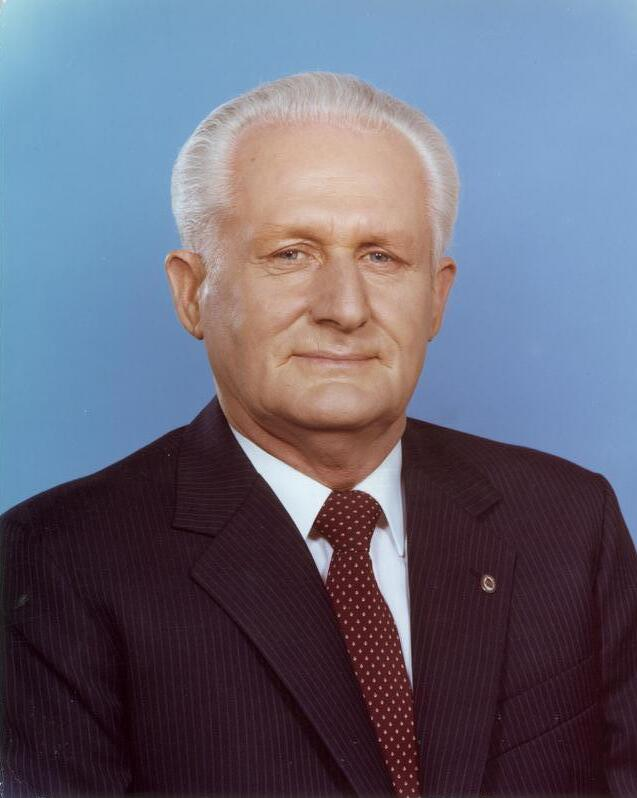
- Mittag in 1984

Secretary for the Economy of the Central Committee Secretariat of the Socialist Unity Party
- In office 22 May 1976 – 18 October 1989
- General Secretary: Erich Honecker
- Preceded by: Werner Krolikowski
- Succeeded by: Wolfgang Rauchfuß
- In office 28 June 1962 – 2 October 1973
- First Secretary: Walter Ulbricht; Erich Honecker
- Preceded by: Erich Apel
- Succeeded by: Werner Krolikowski

First Deputy Chairman of the Council of Ministers
- In office 3 October 1973 – 1 November 1976 Serving with Alfred Neumann
- Chairman: Horst Sindermann
- Preceded by: Horst Sindermann
- Succeeded by: Werner Krolikowski

Member of the Volkskammer for Erfurt-Stadt
- In office 20 October 1963 – 16 November 1989
- Preceded by: multi-member district
- Succeeded by: Karl-Heinz Wüstefelde

Personal details
- Born: 8 October 1926 Stettin, Province of Pomerania, Free State of Prussia, Weimar Republic (now Szczecin, Poland)
- Died: 18 March 1994 (aged 67) Berlin, Germany
- Party: Independent
- Other political affiliations: Socialist Unity Party (1946–1989); Communist Party of Germany (1945–1946)
- Education: Hochschule für Verkehrswesen
- Occupation: Politician; Union Secretary
- Awards: Order of Karl Marx
- Central institution membership: 1966–1989: Full member, Politburo of the Central Committee; 1963–1966: Candidate member, Politburo of the Central Committee; 1962–1989: Full member, Central Committee; Other offices held: 1979–1989: Member, National Defence Council; 1963–1971; 1979–1989: Member, State Council; 1961–1962: Secretary, People's Economic Council; 1958–1961: Secretary, Economic Commission at the Politburo; 1953–1958: Head, Central Committee Railways, Transportation and Connectivity Department
- De facto leader of the GDR: ← Honecker; Honecker →

Günter Mittag (8 October 1926 – 18 March 1994) was a German politician who served as a member of parliament, secretary of the Socialist Unity Party of Germany (SED), and a central figure in East Germany's command economy.

== Biography ==
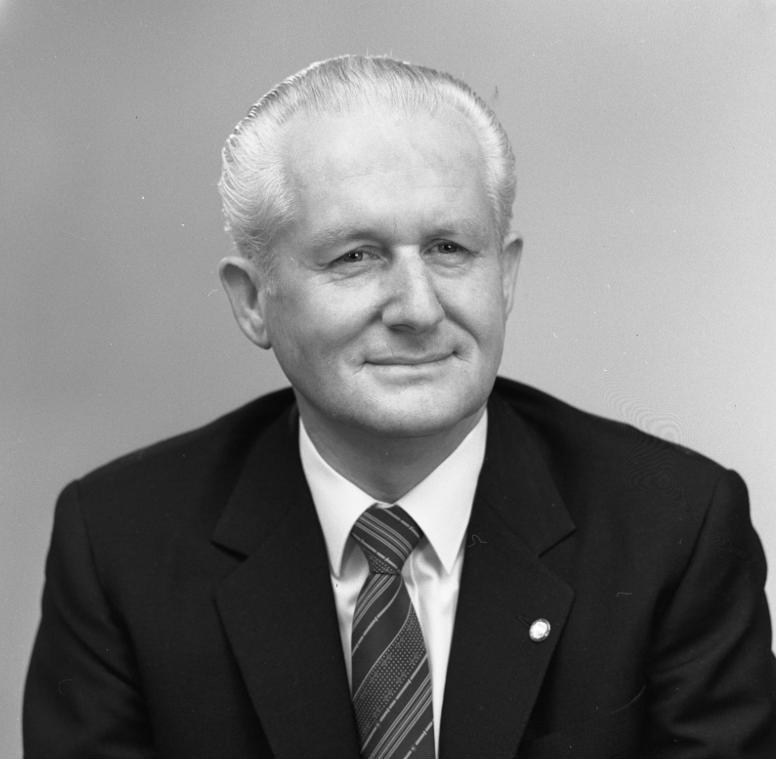
Günter Mittag, 1981

Born to a working-class family in Stettin (now Szczecin). After completing vocational education with the Reichsbahn, Mittag served in a flak regiment of the Wehrmacht in the Second World War. He joined the Communist Party of Germany (KPD) in 1945, became a member of the SED in 1946 and by 1958, when he had earned his doctorate with a dissertation entitled "Die Überlegenheit der sozialistischen Organisation und Leitung im Eisenbahnwesen der DDR gegenüber dem kapitalistischen Eisenbahnwesen" (en: The Superiority of Socialist Organisation and Performance in the Railroads of the GDR to the Capitalist Railroads), he became Secretary of the Economic Commission at the Politbüro. In 1963 he became a member of parliament and (until 1971, and then again from 1979 to 1989) a member of the State Council of the German Democratic Republic (GDR).

Also in 1963 he became Leiter des Büros für Industrie- und Bauwesen des ZK ("Head of the Office for Industry and Construction of the Central Committee of the SED"). He and Erich Apel designed the New System for Economic Management and Planning (NÖSPL), to modernise and streamline the formerly-bureaucratic economy of the GDR. This was politically controversial and only very partially implemented.

Between 1962 and 1989, for all but three years (when Mittag was transferred to the Council of Ministers after assaulting a Central Committee department head), Mittag was Secretary for the Economy of the Central Committee of the SED. He advocated, and implemented, strict economic controls throughout his tenure. His leadership style was controversial, involving confrontations with ministers and demands for the summary dismissal of officials. He was particularly close to Franz Josef Strauss, and in the early 1980s arranged the so-called "Billion Loan" from West Germany.

Mittag was severely diabetic and in 1984 one of his lower legs was amputated: the other was removed in 1987. He left office after a controversy that led to him being taken into custody, but he was released on health grounds. In 1991 he was accused of using government funds for a private home.

He received honorary doctorates from the University of Tokyo and the University of Leoben in Austria.

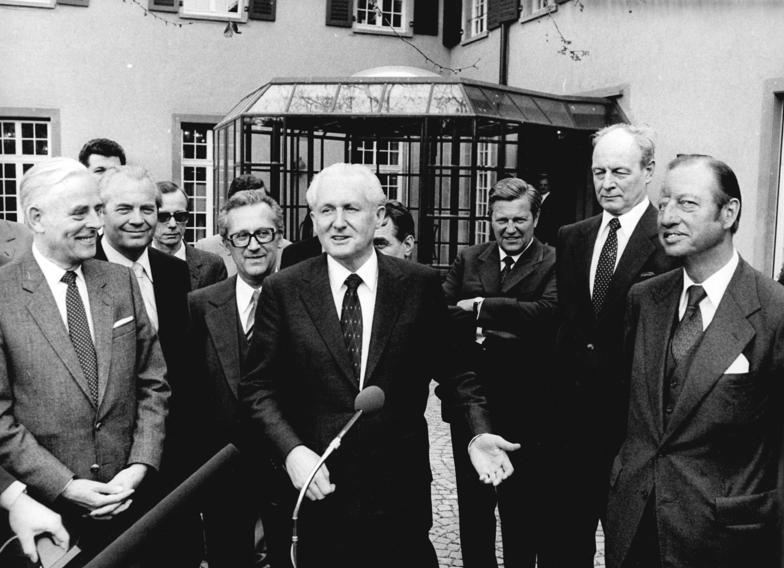
Günter Mittag, 1980

== Sources ==
- Przybylski, Peter: Tatort Politburo, 1992, ISBN 3-499-19328-0
- Hertle, Hans-Hermann: Prior to the bankruptcy of the GDR: documents of the Politburo of the CC of the SED from 1988 to the failure of the "Economic and social policy" (The Schürer / Mittag controversy). In an interview with Gerhard Schürer, Berlin 1991
- Janson, Carl-Heinz: Gravedigger of the GDR. How Günter Mittag ruined state, Düsseldorf 1991
- Mittag, Günter: At any price. In the tension between two systems, Berlin / Weimar, 1991
- Mittag, Günter: "It breaks my heart': Spiegel-interview with the former East German economic czar Günter Mittag on his policies and his errors, in Der Spiegel, 37/1991, p. 88-104.
