= Hans Loch =

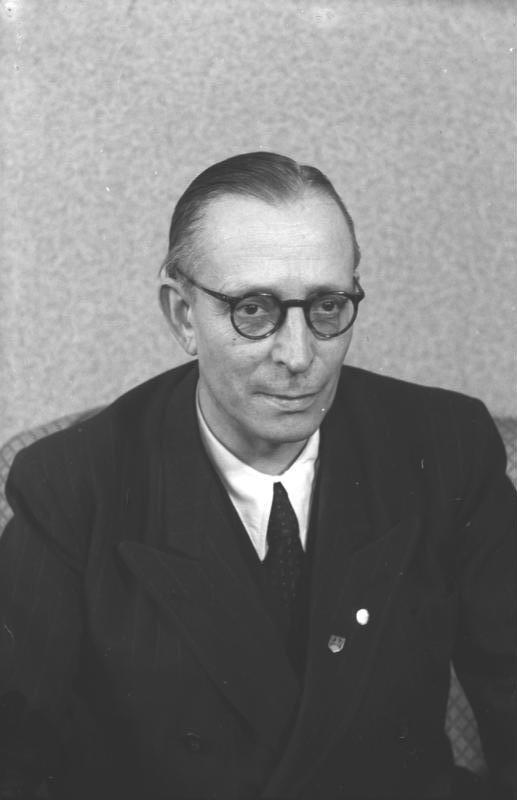
- Loch in 1951

Leader of the Liberal Democratic Party of Germany
- In office 1951–1960
- Preceded by: Hermann Kastner
- Succeeded by: Max Suhrbier

Minister of Finance of the German Democratic Republic
- In office 1949–1955
- Preceded by: office established
- Succeeded by: Willy Rumpf

Mayor of Gotha
- In office 1946–1948
- Preceded by: Kurt Hermann Hassfeld
- Succeeded by: Walter Wurriehausen

Personal details
- Born: November 2, 1898 Cologne, German Empire
- Died: July 13, 1960 (aged 61) East Berlin, German Democratic Republic
- Resting place: Dorotheenstadt Cemetery, Berlin
- Party: Liberal Democratic Party of Germany (1945-)
- Education: University of Cologne; University of Bonn
- Awards: Patriotic Order of Merit (1954)

Military service
- Allegiance: Nazi Germany (1939-1945); German Empire (1917-1918)
- Battles/wars: Second World War; First World War

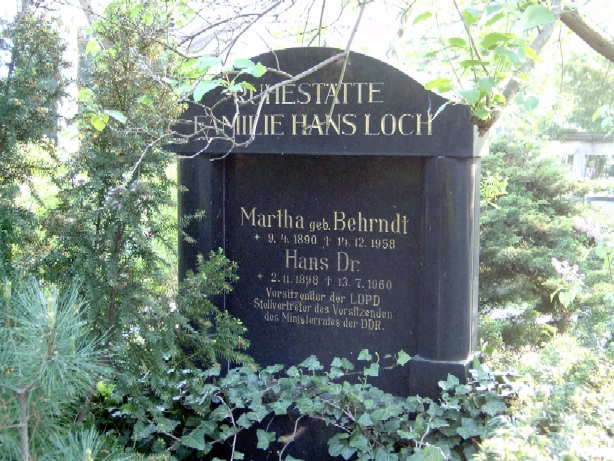
Hans Loch's grave in the Dorotheenstadt cemetery in Berlin.

Hans Loch (2 November 1898 in Cologne – 13 July 1960 in Berlin) was Chairman of the Liberal Democratic Party of Germany and Finance Minister of the German Democratic Republic.

== Life ==
After his secondary education Loch was drafted for military service in 1917. From 1918 to 1923 he studied law at the Universities of Cologne and Bonn and then worked as a legal adviser and tax counsellor. In 1936 he emigrated to the Netherlands, but returned to Germany in 1938 and from 1939 to 1945 was a soldier in the Wehrmacht.

In 1945 Loch was a co-founder of the Liberal Democratic Party in the district of Gotha. From 1947 he was Chairman of the municipal policy subcommittee of the Central Board, and from 1949 deputy chairman of the party. In 1951 he became party chairman of the LDPD, first together with Karl Hamann, and then alone, following the arrest of the latter in December 1952.

From 1946 to 1948 he was mayor of Gotha, then until 1950 Minister of Justice of Thuringia, and from 1949 to 1955 he served as Minister of Finance of the GDR. As finance minister, he was a member of the Council of Ministers. From 1949 he was a member of the (provisional) Volkskammer (People's Chamber), from 1950 Vice Chairman of the Council of Ministers and from 1954 a member of the Presidium of the National Council of the National Front.

In 1954 Loch was awarded the Patriotic Order of Merit.

== Written works ==
- Ein Bürger sieht die Sowjetunion, Leipzig 1953
- Auf seltsamen Pfaden. Streifzüge durch das Russland von gestern und heute, Berlin 1955
- In eine neue Epoche. Ein Buch für den Mittelstand, Berlin 1958
- Von der Elbe bis zum Gelben Meer, Berlin 1958
- Wir sind dabei gewesen, Berlin 1959

== Sources ==
- Herbert Hömig (1985). "Loch, Hans". Neue Deutsche Biographie (in German). Vol. 14. Berlin: Duncker & Humblot. pp. 742–743. (full text online).
- Wer war wer in der DDR?
