= Werner Schmieder =

East German finance minister (born 1926)

Minister of Finance and Prize
- In office June 1980 – June 1981
- Prime Minister: Willi Stoph
- Preceded by: Siegfried Böhm
- Succeeded by: Ernst Höfner

Personal details
- Born: 11 November 1926 (age 99) Bannewitz, Germany
- Party: Socialist Unity Party of Germany

Werner Schmieder (born 11 November 1926) is a former politician who served as the minister of finance in East Germany in the period 1980–1981.

== Biography ==
Schmieder was born in Possendorf, today Bannewitz, on 11 November 1926. He received a degree in economy and in 1967 he also obtained his Ph.D. in road engineering. Between 1949 and 1955 he worked at Investbank in Dresden. In 1955 he became a member of the Socialist Unity Party. He was the head of the Investbank in Cottbus from 1955 to 1962. He served as the deputy minister of finance (1967–1974) and state secretary (1974–1980).

Schmieder was appointed minister of finance in July 1980 succeeding Siegfried Böhm in the post. Schmieder's term ended in June 1981 when Ernst Höfner replaced him in the post.

Political offices
Preceded by Siegfried Böhm	Finance Minister of East Germany; 1980–1981	Succeeded by Ernst Höfner
