= Ernst Höfner (politician) =

German politician (1929–2009)

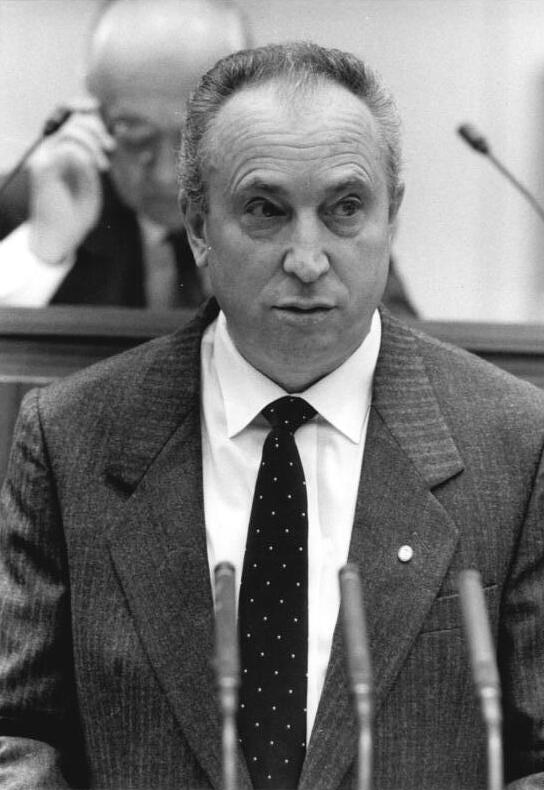
E. Höfner

Ernst Höfner (1 October 1929 – 24 November 2009) was Finance Minister of the German Democratic Republic. Born in Berlin, Höfner graduated with a degree in business. In the 1960s, he was a secretary in the finance ministry. From 1970 to 1976 he was deputy minister of finance. From 1976 to 1979 he was first secretary of SED's department for central bank and financial organs. And from 1979 to 1981 he was also first secretary of the national planning commission. From 1981 to 1989, after succeeding Werner Schmieder, he served as Finance Minister. As Finance Minister, he also belonged to the presidency of the cabinet council.

Political offices
Preceded by Werner Schmieder	Finance Minister of East Germany; 1981–1989	Succeeded by Uta Nickel
