= List of members of the ninth Volkskammer =

This list gives an overview of all Members of East German Volkskammer during its 9th election period (1986–1990).
Stand: 15. August 1986

== Composition ==
As per the Volkskammer election of 8 June 1986, according to official results, 99.94% of ballots were for candidates of Die nationale Front.

Faction	Seats	According to partisanship
SED	127	276
DBD	52	52
CDU	52	54
LDPD	52	53
NDPD	52	53
FDGB	61	-
DFD	32	-
FDJ	37	-
Kulturbund	21	-
Vereinigung der gegenseitigen Bauernhilfe	14	-
parteilos	-	12
gesamt	500	500

The election itself had no influence on the composition of the parliament and factions. All seats had been allocated beforehand.

== Präsidium ==
- Chairman of the Volkskammer
  Horst Sindermann (SED)
- Deputy of the Chairman of the Volkskammer
  Gerald Götting (CDU)
- Members of Präsidium:
  Dr. Rudolf Agtsen (LDPD)
  Heinz Eichler (SED)
  Günter Hartmann (NDPD)
  Werner Heilemann (FDGB)
  Wolfgang Heyl (CDU)
  Dr. Günther Maleuda (DBD)
  Erich Mückenberger (SED)
  Manfred Scheler (VdgB)
  Wilhelmine Schirmer-Pröscher (DFD)
  Dr. Karl-Heinz Schulmeister (Kulturbund)
  Volker Voigt (FDJ)

== Faction chairmen ==
- Faction of the SED
  Erich Mückenberger
- Faction of the DBPD Erwin Binder
- Faction of the CDU
  Wolfgang Heyl
- Faction of the LDPD
  Dr. Rudolf Agsten
- Faction of the NDPD
  Günter Hartmann
- Faction of the FDGB
  Hans Jendretzky
- Faction of the DFD
  Eva Rohmann
- Faction of the FDJ
  Hans-Joachim Willerding
- Faction of the Kulturbundes
  Dr. Karl-Heinz Schulmeister
- Faction of the VdgB
  Manfred Scheler

== A ==
1. Josef Aberth, DBD
2. Dr. Rudolf Agsten, LDPD
3. Lutz Ahnfeld, FDJ
4. Erika Albrecht, DFD
5. Hans Albrecht, SED
6. Gudrun Anders, LDPD
7. Dr. Erich Arand, VdgB
8. Manfred von Ardenne, Kulturbund
9. Otto Arndt, SED
10. Dr. Karlheinz Arnold, SED
11. Helmut Ast, FDGB
12. Eberhard Aurich, FDJ
13. Bärbel Aust, VdgB
14. Hermann Axen, SED

== B ==
1. Martina Baumert, SED
2. Dr. Gerhard Baumgärtel, CDU
3. Manfred Becher, DBD
4. Eva Becker, DFD
5. Christel Bednareck, FDGB
6. Kerstin Bednarsky, DFD
7. Friedl Behnke, FDGB
8. Dr. Armin Behrendt, LDPD
9. Bärbel Behrens, CDU
10. Petra Belitz, FDGB
11. Dr. Bruno Benthien, LDPD
12. Erna Berg, DBD
13. Wiete Bergmann, FDGB
14. Barbara Beyer, FDJ
15. Wolfgang Beyreuther, FDGB
16. Ewald Bialas, FDGB
17. Jürgen Biering, DBD
18. Erwin Binder, DBD
19. Bettina Bleil, FDGB
20. Karl-Joachim Blume, DBD
21. Simone Blumhagen, FDJ
22. Frank Bochow, FDGB
23. Dr. Heinz Böhm, CDU
24. Günter Böhme, SED
25. Dr. Hans-Joachim Böhme, SED
26. Reinhard Bolduan, SED
27. Klaus-Dieter Bormann, FDGB
28. Kerstin Braasch, FDJ
29. Horst Brasch, SED
30. Dr. Manfred Brendel, LDPD
31. Heidemarie Brenner, SED
32. Ellen Brombacher, SED
33. Dr. Christoph Brückner, LDPD
34. Horst Brünner, SED
35. Günter Brust, LDPD
36. Klaus Buchholz, LDPD
37. Wolfgang Büchner, FDGB
38. Margitta Buhr, SED
39. Lothar Burkhardt, SED
40. Siegfried Burkhardt, VdgB
41. Heinz Busch, LDPD

== C ==
1. Johannes Chemnitzer, SED
2. Andreas Claus, DBD
3. Gerhard Clausner, SED
4. Dr. Manfred Clauß, SED
5. Arthur Czadeck, FDGB
6. Dr. Dietmar Czok, CDU

== D ==
1. Fritz Dallmann, VdgB
2. Dr. Siegfried Dallmann, NDPD
3. Friedrich Dickel, SED
4. Jürgen Dietel, FDGB
5. Horst Dohlus, SED
6. Heike Dombrowski, DBD
7. Heinz Dreblow, SED
8. Gottfried Drechsel, VdgB
9. Heike Drechsler, FDJ
10. Dr. Günther Drefahl, Kulturbund

== E ==
1. Dr. Paul Eberle, LDPD
2. Werner Eberlein, SED
3. Günter Ehrensperger, SED
4. Herbert Eichhorn, DBD
5. Heinz Eichler, SED
6. Dr. Klaus Elsner, DBD
7. Dr. Gottfried Engelmann, LDPD
8. Karin Engert, NDPD
9. Albert Enke, FDGB
10. Heino Ernst, FDGB
11. Manfred Ewald, SED

== F ==
1. Ulrich Fahl, CDU
2. Dr. Heinz Fahrenkrog, FDGB
3. Herbert Fechner, SED
4. Dr. Klaus Fehrmann, SED
5. Werner Felfe, SED
6. Dr. Kurt Fenske, SED
7. Lothar Fichtner, SED
8. Otto Fiedler, DBD
9. Horst Fischer, NDPD
10. Dr. Klaus-Christian Fischer, NDPD
11. Oskar Fischer, SED
12. Sabine Fischer, FDGB
13. Manfred Flegel, NDPD
14. Peter Florin, SED
15. Renate Fölsch, DFD
16. Heidi Franke, NDPD
17. Heinz Freier, SED
18. Lutz Frenkel, FDJ
19. Norberta Freundel, NDPD
20. Peter Freyer, SED
21. Marlies Fritzsch, DBD
22. Gisela Fuchs, DFD
23. Friedel Fuckel, DFD
24. Liesbeth Füßler, DBD
25. Otto Funke, SED

== G ==
1. Uwe Gajewski, FDJ
2. Manfred Gehmert, SED
3. Dr. Manfred Gerlach, LDPD
4. Joachim-Ernst Gierspeck, LDPD
5. Andreas Gleisberg, DBD
6. Gerda Göbel, CDU
7. Dr. Manfred Goedecke, NDPD
8. Beate Göhring, FDGB
9. Sybille Göttert, VdgB
10. Gerald Götting, CDU
11. Otto-Christoph Götze, NDPD
12. Andreas Golbs, FDJ
13. Ernst Goldenbaum, DBD
14. Alfred Grandke, LDPD
15. Günther Grewe, CDU
16. Jana Grießbach, FDJ
17. Hannelore Grimm, FDGB
18. Dr. Ines Grosche, CDU
19. Irmgard Groschupf, NDPD
20. Jurij Groß, SED
21. Manfred Grund, LDPD
22. Klaus Gysi, Kulturbund

== H ==
1. Kerstin Haake, SED
2. Susanne Häber, DBD
3. Helge Häger, SED
4. Hans Härtel, FDJ
5. Anita Häußler, SED
6. Kurt Hager, SED
7. Erika Hahn, LDPD
8. Walter Halbritter, SED
9. Manfred Hamann, NDPD
10. Gero Hammer, NDPD
11. Georg Handrick, SED
12. Hans-Joachim Hanisch, LDPD
13. Brunhilde Hanke, SED
14. Martin Hanke, SED
15. Siegfried Hanusch, FDGB
16. Getrud Hartmann, DBD
17. Günter Hartmann, NDPD
18. Monika Hasalik, DFD
19. Hannelore Hauschild, DFD
20. Petra Hecht, DBD
21. Werner Heilemann, FDGB
22. Horst Heintze, FDGB
23. Gerda Heller, LDPD
24. Leonhard Helmschrott, DBD
25. Dr. Karlheinz Hengst, NDPD
26. Katrin Hensel, FDJ
27. Johannes Herda, CDU
28. Dr. Wolfgang Herger, SED
29. Joachim Herrmann, SED
30. Hans-Joachim Hertwig, SED
31. Edith Herzig, DBD
32. Klaus Herzog, FDJ
33. Hans-Joachim Heusinger, LDPD
34. Kerstin Heyduck, FDJ
35. Wolfgang Heyl, CDU
36. Lothar Hilbert, VdgB
37. Wolfgang Hinz, DBD
38. Heino Hinze, Kulturbund
39. Annelotte Hochhaus, DFD
40. Ruth Höwe, DBD
41. Dr. Hans-Joachim Hoffmann, Kulturbund
42. Erna Hofmann, FDGB
43. Heinz Hofmann, Kulturbund
44. Klaus Hofmann, DBD
45. Reiner Hofmann, DBD
46. Dr. Witho Holland, LDPD
47. Gerhard Holtz-Baumert, Kulturbund
48. Dr. Heinrich Homann, NDPD
49. Erich Honecker, SED
50. Margot Honecker, SED
51. Dr. Claus Howitz, DBD
52. Claus-Jürgen Huch, NDPD
53. Max Hübner, FDGB

== I ==
1. Helga Isenberg, LDPD

== J ==
1. Barbara Jacob, FDGB
2. Dr. Brunhild Jaeger, SED
3. Dr. Günther Jahn, SED
4. Frank Janetzky, FDJ
5. Dr. Werner Jarowinsky, SED
6. Norbert Jaskulla, NDPD
7. Dr. Christa Jauch, LDPD
8. Hans Jendretzky, FDGB
9. Regina Jeske-Schmidtchen, NDPD
10. Hertha Jung, DFD
11. Wolfgang Junker, SED

== K ==
1. Ingeborg Kachel, FDGB
2. Erich Kärger, DBD
3. Susanne Kahlert, DFD
4. Siegfried Kaiser, FDGB
5. Werner Kaiser, NDPD
6. Hermann Kalb, CDU
7. Dr. Eberhard Kallenbach, NDPD
8. Dr. Werner Kalweit, SED
9. Hermann Kant, Kulturbund
10. Werner Karn, FDGB
11. Dr. Werner Karwath, CDU
12. Christa Kaufhold, CDU
13. Torsten Kaye, FDJ
14. Karl Kayser, SED
15. Gert Keller, CDU
16. Heinz Keßler, SED
17. Annelis Kimmel, FDGB
18. Dr. Friedrich Kind, CDU
19. Hans-Karl Kiok, VdgB
20. Werner Kirchhoff, SED
21. Helmtraut Klara, DFD
22. Günther Kleiber, SED
23. Dr. Helmut Klein, SED
24. Dr. Volker Klemm, NDPD
25. Dr. Gottfried Klepel, CDU
26. Eveline Klett, DFD
27. Claus-Dieter Knöfler, LDPD
28. Dr. Rudolf Kober, NDPD
29. Dr. Hans Koch, Kulturbund
30. Ursula Köckritz, DFD
31. Dr. Lothar Köhler, LDPD
32. Ingrid Körner, FDGB
33. Werner Körner, LDPD
34. Dr. Lothar Kolditz, Kulturbund
35. Michael Koplanski, DBD
36. Erhard Krack, SED
37. Ewald Kramer, CDU
38. Fritz Krausch, LDPD
39. Gerhard Krause, FDGB
40. Hans Krause, DBD
41. Marika Krause, NDPD
42. Dr. Rosemarie Krautzig, CDU
43. Andrea Krebs, VdgB
44. Egon Krenz, SED
45. Walter Kresse, SED
46. Horst Kreter, NDPD
47. Waldemar Kreutzberger, NDPD
48. René Kriemann, FDJ
49. Adolf Kriesche, SED
50. Hubertus Kriesel, CDU
51. Werner Krolikowski, SED
52. Hermann Kühne, DBD
53. Heinz Kuhrig, SED
54. Doris Kurth, SED
55. Ingrid Kurzke, SED
56. Günter Kutzschebauch, SED

== L ==
1. Helga Labs, FDGB
2. Harald Lange, FDGB
3. Ingeburg Lange, SED
4. Hendry Lehmann, FDGB
5. Wolfgang Lesser, Kulturbund
6. Hans-Harm Leweke, NDPD
7. Hermann Liefländer, LDPD
8. Gustav Liepack, SED
9. Bruno Lietz, SED
10. Karin Limprecht, FDJ
11. Gerhard Lindner, LDPD
12. Dr. Elke Löbl, FDGB
13. Siegfried Löffler, CDU
14. Christa Löhn, DFD
15. Dr. Johannes Löhn, LDPD
16. Rainer Lösekann, LDPD
17. Dr. Gottfried Lonitz, LDPD
18. Siegfried Lorenz, SED
19. Uwe Lorenz, FDJ
20. Werner Lorenz, Kulturbund
21. Werner Lorenz, CDU

== M ==
1. Monika Maak, SED
2. Dr. Günther Maleuda, DBD
3. Mechthild Marchewka, CDU
4. Karl-Heinz Markwart, VdgB
5. Dr. Ernst Mecklenburg, DBD
6. Dr. Ludwig Mecklinger, SED
7. Peter Mederake, NDPD
8. Felix Meier, SED
9. Dr. Jürgen Meißner, DBD
10. Katrin Mende, FDJ
11. Werner Mennicke, SED
12. Dr. Sieglinde Metten, LDPD
13. Erich Mielke, SED
14. Gerhard-Peter Mielke, NDPD
15. Uwe Milinowski, FDGB
16. Dr. Günter Mittag, SED
17. Tatjana Mitterer, FDJ
18. Hartmut Mitzenheim, CDU
19. Dr. Hans Modrow, SED
20. Bernhard Mögling, NDPD
21. Dr. Hans-Dietrich Möller, NDPD
22. Dr. Ute Mohrmann, Kulturbund
23. Dr. Peter Moreth, LDPD
24. Dr. Helga Mucke-Wittbrodt, DFD
25. Helga Mudra, LDPD
26. Erich Mückenberger, SED
27. Dr. Manfred Mühlmann, NDPD
28. Anita Müller, FDGB
29. Gerhard Müller, SED
30. Günter Müller, FDGB
31. Inge Müller, DFD
32. Margarete Müller, SED

== N ==
1. Dr. Harald Naumann, CDU
2. Wolfgang Naumann, NDPD
3. Gudrun Nause, DFD
4. Gerhard Nennstiel, FDGB
5. Heinz Nerlich, NDPD
6. Christian Neubert, FDGB
7. Alfred Neumann, SED
8. Gisela Neumann, DFD
9. Karlheinz Niedermeier, FDGB
10. Adolf Niggemeier, CDU
11. Walter Nörenberg, LDPD

== O ==
1. Volker Oertel, NDPD
2. Friedrich Otto, NDPD

== P ==
1. Engelbert Pade, FDGB
2. Marga Paulitschke, DFD
3. Elisabeth Pech, DBD
4. Thomas Peinke, DBD
5. Heike Pemsel, CDU
6. Margit Petrat, FDGB
7. Gabriele Pfeil, FDGB
8. Klaus Pille, LDPD
9. Alois Pisnik, SED
10. Gundel Plaul, SED
11. Elke Plümke, DBD
12. Rolf Poche, SED
13. Dr. Gerhard Pohl, CDU
14. Dr. Eberhard Poppe, Kulturbund
15. Dr. Wilfried Poßner, FDJ
16. Margot Pschebizin, FDGB

== Q ==
1. Gerhard Quade, FDGB
2. Bernhard Quandt, SED

== R ==
1. Detlef Radke, FDGB
2. Klaus Rank, DBD
3. Hans-Dieter Raspe, LDPD
4. Wolfgang Rauchfuß, SED
5. Ursula Raurin-Kutzner, CDU
6. Dr. Eberhard Rebling, Kulturbund
7. Dr. Hans Reichelt, DBD
8. Ute Reiher, FDGB
9. Sylvia Retzke, SED
10. Ursula Reumann, SED
11. Dr. Edith Reumuth, NDPD
12. Ilona Richter, SED
13. Dr. Konrad Richter, NDPD
14. Hans-Joachim Riebow, SED
15. Brunhilde Rienecker, DFD
16. Renate Ritter, DBD
17. Ilse Rodenberg, NDPD
18. Annette Römhild, VdgB
19. Dr. Fritz Rösel, FDGB
20. Doris Röwe, CDU
21. Alfred Rohde, SED
22. Eva Rohmann, DFD
23. Dr. Ulrike Rommel, NDPD
24. Karla Rose, CDU
25. Horst Rusch, FDGB
26. Wilmar Rutt, FDGB

== S ==
1. Dr. Anneliese Sälzer, Kulturbund
2. Franz-Josef Salbreiter, CDU
3. Gertrud Sasse, LDPD
4. Günter Schabowski, SED
5. Manfred Scheler, VdgB
6. Dr. Werner Scheler, Kulturbund
7. Dr. Bärbel Schindler-Saefkow, DFD
8. Dr. Gregor Schirmer, Kulturbund
9. Wilhelmine Schirmer-Pröscher, DFD
10. Dr. Volker Schliebe, NDPD
11. Ursula Schlosser, DFD
12. Verena Schlüsselburg, DBD
13. Anneliese Schmidt, DFD
14. Bettina Schmidt, FDJ
15. Gerhard Schmidt, DBD
16. Dr. Burkhard Schneeweiß, CDU
17. Dorothea Schneider, CDU
18. Ilse Schneider, LDPD
19. Dr. Horst Schönfelder, CDU
20. Edelgard Schönicke, DBD
21. Gerhard Scholz, FDGB
22. Paul Scholz, DBD
23. Sigrid Schröder, SED
24. Ingeborg Schubert, DFD
25. Dr. Manfred Schubert, SED
26. Gerhard Schürer, SED
27. Renate Schüßler, SED
28. Gisela Schütt, DFD
29. Dr. Karl-Heinz Schulmeister, Kulturbund
30. Dr. Joachim Schultz, NDPD
31. Gerd Schulz, FDJ
32. Marion Schulz, VdgB
33. Rudolph Schulze, CDU
34. Horst Schumann, SED
35. Gustav-Adolf Schur, SED
36. Brigitte Schuster, SED
37. Dr. Peter Schwartze, Kulturbund
38. Ekkehard Schweitzer, NDPD
39. Max Sefrin, CDU
40. Helmut Semmelmann, SED
41. Max Seydewitz, SED
42. Günter Sieber, SED
43. Rosemarie Sievert, LDPD
44. Dr. Käte Sima-Niederkirchner, SED
45. Lothar Simon, LDPD
46. Horst Sindermann, SED
47. Wilhelm Sitte, Kulturbund
48. Günther Skrzypek, SED
49. Werner Skunde, DBD
50. Reinhard Sommer, FDGB
51. Ulrich Sommer, LDPD
52. Dr. Klaus Sorgenicht, SED
53. Dr. Thomas Speck, FDJ
54. Roland Spiegel, SED
55. Gerhard Springer, LDPD
56. Dr. Gerd Staegemann, NDPD
57. Dr. Karl-Hermann Steinberg, CDU
58. Helmut Steinbrück, SED
59. Wilfried Stern, NDPD
60. Dr. Albert Stief, SED
61. Dieter Stollberg, LDPD
62. Willi Stoph, SED
63. Frank Straube, FDJ
64. Paul Strauß, SED
65. Heidemarie Stübner, NDPD
66. Dr. Michael Succow, LDPD
67. Ellen Süß, FDJ
68. Anja Susset, FDJ

== T ==
1. Renate Tappert, DFD
2. Ilse Thiele, DFD
3. Klaus-Dieter Thiemes, DBD
4. Lieselotte Thoms-Heinrich, DFD
5. Dr. Hans-Manfred Turm, CDU
6. Kurt Tiedke, SED
7. Ernst Timm, SED
8. Harry Tisch, SED
9. Dr. Johanna Töpfer, FDGB
10. Dr. Heinrich Toeplitz, CDU
11. Hannelore Tomaschek, CDU
12. Annerose Tomschin, FDJ
13. Gottfried Torbicki, NDPD
14. Dr. Harry Trumpold, LDPD
15. Fritz Tschetschorke, DBD

== U ==
1. Kerstin Uhlich, FDGB
2. Andreas Uhlig, FDGB
3. Uta Ullrich, FDJ
4. Dr. Dietrich Unangst, NDPD
5. Johannes Unger, FDGB
6. Gisela Unrein, FDGB

== V ==
1. Paul Verner, SED
2. Kerstin Völzer, FDJ
3. Karl Vogel, SED
4. Volker Voigt, FDJ
5. Dr. Dietrich Voigtberger, CDU
6. Uta Voigtländer, FDJ

== W ==
1. Dr. Rudolf Wabersich, DBD
2. Manfred Wahls, CDU
3. Werner Walde, SED
4. Hans Waldmann, SED
5. Christa Waldmann-Hojer, CDU
6. Marion Walsmann, CDU
7. Rosel Walther, NDPD
8. Dr. Horst Wambutt, SED
9. Albert Wappler, FDGB
10. Dieter Wartewig, NDPD
11. Dr. Hans Watzek, DBD
12. Simone Wecks, FDJ
13. Dr. Wolfgang Weichelt, SED
14. Klaus-Peter Weichenhain, LDPD
15. Werner Weichenhain, LDPD
16. Dietrich Weisel, DBD
17. Wilhelm Weißgärber, DBD
18. Dr. Herbert Weiz, SED
19. Dr. Gert Wendelborn, CDU
20. Sabine Wenzel, NDPD
21. Rudolf Werion, NDPD
22. Dr. Karl-Heinz Werner, DBD
23. Monika Werner, SED
24. Gerolf Wetzel, DBD
25. Ruth Weyh, LDPD
26. Christine Wieynk, CDU
27. Karin-Christiane Wilhelm, CDU
28. Richard Wilhelm (DDR), LDPD
29. Dr. Herbert Willem, SED
30. Hans-Joachim Willerding, FDJ
31. Dr. Hanna Wolf, LDPD
32. Dr. Klaus Wolf, CDU
33. Dr. Manfred Wolf, FDGB
34. Cornelia Wolfram, FDJ
35. Lothar Wolter, LDPD
36. Dieter-Gerhardt Worm, CDU
37. Dr. Werner Wünschmann, CDU

== Z ==
1. Tom Zentrich, FDJ
2. Gisela Zepp, DFD
3. Herbert Ziegenhahn, SED
4. Heinz Ziegner, SED
5. Brigitte Zienert, DBD
6. Ines Zill, VdgB
7. Dr. Johannes Zillig, CDU
8. Dr. Udo Zylla, NDPD
