= List of members of the eighth Volkskammer =

Volkskammer Members

This list provides an overview of all members of the People's Chamber of the GDR in the 8th legislative period (1981–1986).

== Composition ==
According to official data, in the 1981 People's Chamber election, 99.86% of voters cast their votes for the nomination proposed by the National Front.

Faction	Seats	Party Affiliation
SED	127	276
DBD	52	52
CDU	52	54
LDPD	52	53
NDPD	52	53
FDGB	68	–
DFD	35	–
FDJ	40	–
KB	22	–
Independent	–	12
Total	500	500

The election did not impact the strength of the factions; their sizes were predetermined. The right column of the above table reflects the party affiliations of the members within the FDGB, DFD, FDJ, and Kulturbund factions.

== Presidium ==
- President of the People's Chamber
  Horst Sindermann (SED)
- Deputy President of the People's Chamber
  Gerald Götting (CDU)
- Members of the Presidium:
  Willi-Peter Konzok (LDPD)
  Rudolf Agsten (LDPD) from 1983
  Wolfgang Heyl (CDU)
  Erich Mückenberger (SED)
  Wilhelmine Schirmer-Pröscher (DFD)
  Heinz Eichler (SED)
  Karl-Heinz Schulmeister (Kulturbund)
  Ernst Mecklenburg (DBD)
  Rudi Rothe (DBD) from 1982
  Werner Heilemann (FDGB)
  Eberhard Aurich (FDJ)
  Wolfgang Rösser (NDPD)

== Faction Leaders ==
- SED Faction
  Erich Mückenberger
- DBD Faction
  Leonhard Helmschrott
- CDU Faction
  Wolfgang Heyl
- LDPD Faction
  Rudolf Agsten
- NDPD Faction
  Siegfried Dallmann
- FDGB Faction
  Hans Jendretzky
- DFD Faction
  Katharina Kern
  Eva Rohmann (from 1984)
- FDJ Faction
  Günter Böhme (until 1982)
  Hans-Joachim Willerding (from 1982)
- KB Faction
  Karl-Heinz Schulmeister, Kulturbund

== MPs ==
Name	Faction	Remarks
Joseph Aberth	DBD	
Alexander Abusch	KB	deceased on January 27, 1982
Rudolf Agsten	LDPD	Member of the Presidium of the People's Chamber; Chairman of the CDU parliamentary group
Lutz Ahnfeld	FDJ	
Erika Albrecht	DFD	
Hans Albrecht	SED	
Kurt Anclam	LDPD	
Gudrun Anders	LDPD	
Manfred von Ardenne	KB	
Otto Arndt	SED	
Elke Arnold	CDU	
Karlheinz Arnold	SED	
Eberhard Aurich	FDJ	
Hermann Axen	SED	
Petra Bahrs	FDGB	
Manfred Becher	DBD	
Edelgard Becker	DBD	
Hannelore Becker	FDGB	
Christel Bednareck	FDGB	
Kerstin Behnisch	DFD	
Friedl Behnke	FDGB	
Sieglinde Behrend	FDJ	
Bärbel Behrens	CDU	
Petra Belitz	FDGB	
Bruno Benthien	LDPD	
Erna Berg	DBD	
Wiete Bergmann	FDGB	
Kurt Bernheiden	NDPD	
Bernd Beyer	DBD	
Wolfgang Beyreuther	FDGB	
Ewald Bialas	FDGB	
Erwin Binder	DBD	
Heinz Böhm	CDU	
Peter Böhm	FDJ	
Günter Böhme	FDJ	until 1982 chairman of the FDJ parliamentary group
Hans-Joachim Böhme	SED	
Andreas Börner	FDJ	
Reinhard Bolduan	SED	
Walter Boltz	DBD	
Lothar Bolz	NDPD	
Klaus-Dieter Bormann	FDJ	
Horst Brasch	SED	
Ellen Brombacher	FDJ	
Christoph Brückner	LDPD	
Günter Brust	LDPD	
Klaus Buchholz	LDPD	
Wolfgang Büchner	FDGB	
Lothar Burkhardt	SED	
Johannes Chemnitzer	SED	
Andreas Claus	DBD	
Gerhard Clausner	SED	
Manfred Clauss	SED	
Siegfried Dallmann	NDPD	
Hans Deckert	NDPD	
Karin Demuth	SED	
Friedrich Dickel	SED	
Horst Döll	NDPD	
Horst Dohlus	SED	
Heinz Dreblow	SED	
Günther Drefahl	KB	
Gertraud Dreihardt	DFD	
Paul Eberle	LDPD	
Günter Ehrensperger	SED	
Herbert Eichhorn	DBD	
Heinz Eichler	SED	Member of the Presidium of the People's Chamber
Klaus Elsner	DBD	
Gottfried Engelmann	LDPD	
Albert Enke	FDGB	
Heino Ernst	FDGB	
Manfred Ewald	SED	
Ulrich Fahl	CDU	
Heinz Fahrenkrog	FDGB	
Herbert Fechner	SED	
Klaus Fehrmann	SED	
Werner Felfe	SED	died in 1988
Kurt Fenske	SED	
Kerstin Fenzke	FDJ	
Otto Fiedler	DBD	
Horst Fischer	NDPD	
Oscar Fisherman	SED	
Sabine Fischer	FDGB	
Manfred Flegel	NDPD	
Peter Florin	SED	
Renate Fölsch	FDGB	
Heinz Freier	SED	
Peter Freyer	SED	
Gisela Fuchs	DFD	
Friedel Fuckel	DFD	
Tamara Füßl	FDGB	
Liesbeth Füßler	DBD	
Otto Funke	SED	
Uwe Gajewski	FDJ	
Dieter Gaudian	SED	
Petra Gentz	SED	
Manfred Gerlach	LDPD	
Joachim-Ernst Gierspeck	LDPD	
Grete Glawe	FDGB	
Gerda Göbel	CDU	
Beate Göhring	FDGB	
Gerald Götting	CDU	Deputy President of the People's Chamber
Ernst Goldenbaum	DBD	
Alfred Grandke	LDPD	
Günther Grewe	CDU	
Ines Grosche	CDU	
Irmgard Groschupf	NDPD	
Manfred Grossmann	LDPD	
Erich Grützner	SED	
Silvia Grützner	FDJ	
Manfred Grund	LDPD	
Klaus Gysi	KB	
Ralf Haase	FDJ	
Susanne Häber	DBD	
Helge Häger	SED	
Hans Härtel	FDJ	
Anita Häußler	SED	
Kurt Hager	SED	
Erika Hahn	LDPD	
Eva Hahn	DFD	from 1984 parliamentary group leader under the name Rohmann
Ruth Hahn	DFD	
Walter Halbritter	SED	
Wolfram Haller	CDU	
Gero Hammer	NDPD	
Emmi Handke	DFD	
George Handrick	SED	
Hans-Joachim Hanisch	LDPD	
Brunhilde Hanke	SED	
Martin Hanke	SED	
Siegfried Hanusch	FDGB	
Gertrud Hartmann	DBD	
Günter Hartmann	NDPD	
Walter Hartung	NDPD	
Hannelore Hauschild	DFD	
Thea Hauschild	SED	
Werner Heilemann	FDGB	
Horst Heinrich	NDPD	
Horst Heintze	FDGB	
Gabriele Heinze	FDGB	
Günther Heinze	FDGB	
Gerda Heller	LDPD	
Leonhard Helmschrott	DBD	
Horst Hempel	LDPD	
Egon Hengelhaupt	FDGB	
Karlheinz Hengst	NDPD	
Waltraut Hennig	LDPD	
Johannes Herda	CDU	
Wolfgang Herger	FDJ	
Joachim Herrmann	SED	
Hans-Joachim Hertwig	SED	
Edith Herzig	DBD	
Hans-Joachim Heusinger	LDPD	
Wolfgang Heyl	CDU	
Silvia Hinrichs	FDJ	
Elke Hinz	FDJ	
Wolfgang Hinz	DBD	
Heino Hinze	KB	
Annelotte Hochhaus	DFD	
Martina Hönicke	FDGB	
Rudolf Höppner	FDGB	
Ruth Höwe	DBD	
Anni Hoffmann	SED	
Hans-Joachim Hoffmann	KB	
Heinz Hoffmann	SED	deceased on December 2, 1985
Erna Hofmann	FDGB	
Heinz Hofmann	KB	
Christa Hojer	CDU	
Witho Holland	LDPD	
Gerhard Holtz-Baumert	KB	
Heinrich Homann	NDPD	
Erich Honecker	SED	
Margot Honecker	SED	
Horst Hornung	FDGB	deceased on September 17, 1982
Heinz Hoßfeld	FDGB	
Claus Howitz	DBD	
Claus-Jürgen Huch	NDPD	
Max Hübner	FDGB	
Thomas Hübner	FDJ	
Helga Isenberg	LDPD	
Barbara Jacob	FDGB	
Brunhild Jaeger	SED	
Karl Jänecke	LDPD	
Günther Jahn	SED	
Werner Jarowinsky	SED	
Christa Jauch	LDPD	
Hans Jendretzky	FDGB	
Hertha Jung	DFD	
Wolfgang Junker	SED	
Ingeborg Kachel	FDGB	
Erich Kärger	DBD	
Susanne Kahlert	DFD	
Elfi Kaiser	CDU	
Siegfried Kaiser	FDGB	
Werner Kaiser	NDPD	
Hermann Kalb	CDU	
Eberhard Kallenbach	NDPD	
Werner Kalweit	SED	
Hermann Kant	KB	
Werner Karwath	CDU	
Christa Kauhold	CDU	
Karl Kayser	KB	
Willi Keindorf	SED	
Katharina Kern	DFD	deceased on April 16, 1985
Doris Kersten	DFD	
Heinz Keßler	SED	
Bruno Kiesler	SED	
Annelis Kimmel	FDGB	
Friedrich Kind	CDU	
Werner Kirchhoff	SED	
Franz Kirchner	CDU	
Ruth Kirsch	SED	
Helmtraut Klara	DFD	
Günther Kleiber	SED	
Helmut Klein	SED	
Volker Klemm	NDPD	
Gottfried Klepel	CDU	
Eveline Klett	DFD	
Wilfried Klöser	FDGB	
Lucie Knobloch	DBD	
Claus-Dieter Knöfler	LDPD	
Heinz Knorr	NDPD	
Hans Koch	KB	
Ursula Köckritz	DFD	
Lothar Köhler	LDPD	
Karin König	NDPD	
Erwin Körber	DBD	
Ingrid Körner	FDGB	
Willi-Peter Konzok	LDPD	1983 resigned as a member of the Executive Committee deceased on July 26, 1984
Michael Koplanski	DBD	
Erhard Krack	SED	
Edda Kramer	DFD	
Ewald Kramer	CDU	
Heinz Kratkey	NDPD	on June 15, 1984, resignation confirmed
Gerhard Krause	FDGB	
Marika Krause	NDPD	
Rosemarie Krautzig	CDU	
Marion Krebs	FDJ	
Egon Krenz	FDJ	
Walter Kresse	SED	
Horst Kreter	NDPD	
Waldemar Kreutzberger	NDPD	
Adolf Kriesche	SED	
Herbert Kroker	SED	on December 3, 1982, confirmed the desired termination of the mandate
Werner Krolikowski	SED	
Eleonore Kucharczyk	DBD	
Hermann Kühne	DBD	
Heinz Kuhrig	SED	
Traude Kunz	SED	
Silvia Kunze	FDGB	
Ingrid Kurzke	SED	
Helga Labs	FDJ	
Ingeburg Lange	SED	
Renate Lausch	SED	
Ursula Lebelt	DBD	
Hendry Lehmann	FDGB	
Wolfgang Lesser	KB	
Hermann Liefländer	LDPD	
Gustav Liepack	SED	
Gerhard Lindner	LDPD	
Elke Löbl	FDGB	
Siegfried Löffler	CDU	
Christa Löhn	DFD	
Johannes Löhn	LDPD	
Rainer Lösekann	LDPD	
Erhard Lonscher	NDPD	
Siegfried Lorenz	SED	
Werner Lorenz	KB	
Werner Lorenz	CDU	
Werner Lüder	NDPD	
Birgit Lüdtke	FDJ	
Martin Maassen	LDPD	
Günter Mähl	NDPD	
Günther Maleuda	DBD	
Mechthild Marchewka	CDU	
Joachim Matysiak	FDJ	
Ernst Mecklenburg	DBD	
Ludwig Mecklinger	SED	
Peter Mederake	NDPD	on June 15, 1984, for Rep. Kratkey moved up
Felix Meier	SED	
Heinrich Meier	NDPD	
Jürgen Meißner	DBD	
Werner Mennicke	SED	
Else Merke	DBD	
Sieglinde Metten	LDPD	
Gottfried Meyer	CDU	
Erich Mielke	SED	
Gerhard-Peter Mielke	NDPD	
Günter Mittag	SED	
Hartmut Mitzenheim	CDU	
Hans Modrow	SED	
Hans-Dietrich Möller	NDPD	
Ute Mohrmann	KB	
Günter Morge	LDPD	deceased on January 21, 1984
Helga Mucke-Wittbrodt	DFD	
Helga Mudra	LDPD	on June 15, 1984, for Rep. Moved up tomorrow
Erich Mückenberger	SED	
Manfred Mühlmann	NDPD	
Anita Müller	FDGB	
Gerhard Müller	SED	
Günter Müller	FDGB	
Inge Müller	DFD	
Margarete Müller	SED	
Uta Müller	FDJ	
Harald Naumann	CDU	
Konrad Naumann	SED	
Wolfgang Naumann	NDPD	
Gudrun Nause	DFD	
Heinz Nerlich	NDPD	
Christian Neubert	FDGB	on December 3, 1982, for Rep. Hornung moved up
Heinz Neukrantz	FDGB	
Alfred Neumann	SED	
Anni Neumann	FDGB	
Gisela Neumann	DFD	
Hannelore Neumann	FDGB	
Karlheinz Niedermeier	FDGB	
Adolf Niggemeier	CDU	
Ramona Nique	FDJ	
Rolf Noack	DBD	
Walter Nörenberg	LDPD	
Friedrich Otto	NDPD	
Engelbert Pade	FDGB	
Walter Parey	FDGB	
Monika Paroch	FDGB	
Marga Paulitschke	DFD	
Elisabeth Pech	DBD	
Heike Pemsel	CDU	
Barbara Petzold	FDJ	
Friedrich Pfaffenbach	NDPD	
Ludwig Pfeiffer	NDPD	
Alfons Piatkowski	DBD	
Waldemar Pilz	SED	
Alois Pisnik	SED	
Gundel Plaul	SD	
Rolf Poche	SED	
Gerhard Pohl	CDU	
Manfred Poneß	LDPD	
Eberhard Poppe	KB	
Rudolf Porschitz	NDPD	
Alois Proksch	CDU	
Margot Pschebizin	FDGB	
Sieglinde Puttrich-Gurth	LDPD	
Bernhard Quandt	SED	
Detlef Radke	FDGB	
Klaus Rank	DBD	
Helga Rateitzak	FDGB	
Wolfgang Rauchfuss	SED	
Cornelia Rauer	FDJ	
Ursula Raurin-Kutzner	CDU	
Birgit Rauschenbach	FDJ	
Eberhard Rebling	KB	
Horst Rehtanz	FDGB	
Hans Reichelt	DBD	
Ute Reiher	FDGB	
Manfred Rentsch	NDPD	
Edith Reumuth	NDPD	
Ilona Richter	SED	
Hans-Joachim Riebow	SED	on December 3, 1982, for Rep. Kroker moved up
Brunhilde Rienecker	DFD	
Hans Rietz	DBD	
Renate Ritter	DBD	
Ilse Rodenberg	NDPD	
Alfred Rohde	SED	
Fritz Rösel	FDGB	
Wolfgang Rösser	NDPD	
Doris Röwer	FDJ	
Ulrike Rommel	NDPD	
Karla Rose	CDU	
Harald Rost	SED	
Rudi Rothe	DBD	
Anneliese Sälzler	KB	
Franz-Josef Salbreiter	CDU	
Gertrud Sasse	LDPD	
Günter Schabowski	SED	
Thomas Schauer	FDJ	
Werner Scheler	KB	
Gregor Schirmer	KB	
Wilhelmine Schirmer-Pröscher	DFD	
Gabriele Schleis	FDJ	
Volker Schliebe	NDPD	
Ursula Schlosser	DFD	
Anneliese Schmidt	DFD	
Christine Schmidt	LDPD	on November 30, 1984, for Rep. Konzok moved up
Gerhard Schmidt	DBD	
Burkhard Schneeweiß	CDU	
Dorothea Schneider	CDU	
Ilse Schneider	LDPD	
Roland Schneider	FDGB	
Horst Schönfelder	CDU	
Gerhard Scholz	FDGB	
Paul Scholz	DBD	
Walter Scholz	SED	
Max Schreiber	FDGB	
Sigrid Schröder	SED	
Ingeborg Schubert	DFD	
Manfred Schubert	SED	
Winfried Schubert	FDJ	
Gerhard Schürer	SED	
Gisela Schütt	DFD	
Karl-Heinz Schulmeister	KB	
Joachim Schultz	NDPD	
Rudolph Schulze	CDU	
Horst Schumann	SED	
Gustav-Adolf Schur	SED	
Peter Schwartze	KB	on December 3, 1982, for Rep. Abusch moved up
Ekkehard Schweitzer	NDPD	
Max Sefrin	CDU	
Evelyn Seidemann	FDGB	
Werner Seifert	DBD	
Max Seydewitz	SED	
Günter Sieber	SED	
Rosemarie Sievert	LDPD	
Käte Sima Niederkirchner	SED	
Hans-Heinrich Simon	NDPD	
Lothar Simon	LDPD	
Horst Sindermann	SED	President of the People's Chamber
Willi Sitte	KB	
Günther Skrzypek	SED	
Werner Skunde	DBD	
Ilona Slupianek	FDJ	
Reinhard Sommer	FDGB	
Ullrich Sommer	LDPD	
Klaus Sorgenicht	SED	
Roland Spiegel	SED	
Gerhard Springer	LDPD	
Joachim Srock	SED	on December 3, 1982, for Rep. Verner moved up
Siegfried Stabe	SED	
Gerd Staegemann	NDPD	
Otfried Steger	SED	
Karl-Hermann Steinberg	CDU	
Helmut Steinbrück	LDPD	
Manfred Steiner	DBD	
Wilfried Stern	NDPD	
Albert Stief	SED	
Willi Stoph	SED	
Paul Strauß	SED	
Hans Stubbe	KB	Member until 1984
Reinhold Tannhäuser	LDPD	on November 30, 1984, for Rep. Werthmann moved up
Renate Tappert	DFD	
Kirsten Tennert	FDJ	
Ilse Thiele	DFD	
Kurt Thieme	SED	
Wolfgang Thieme	CDU	
Klaus-Dieter Thiemes	DBD	
Lieselotte Thoms-Heinrich	DFD	
Hans-Manfred Thurm	CDU	
Kurt Tiedke	SED	
Edeltraud Timm	FDJ	
Ernst Timm	SED	
Harry Tisch	SED	
Johanna Töpfer	FDGB	
Heinrich Toeplitz	CDU	
Hannelore Tomaschek	CDU	
Gottfried Torbicki	NDPD	
Harry Trumpold	LDPD	
Fritz Tschetschorke	DBD	
Andreas Uhlig	FDJ	
Thomas Ullner	FDJ	
Dietrich Unangst	NDPD	
Johannes Unger	FDGB	
Rolf Unger	LDPD	
Paul Verner	SED	
Waldemar Verner	SED	died on February 15, 1982
Ursula Völkner	DFD	
Ellen Voigt	FDGB	
Dietrich Voigtberger	CDU	
Sabine Voigtländer	FDJ	
Marion Vorwerk	FDJ	
Rudolf Wabersich	DBD	
Manfred Wahls	CDU	
Werner Walde	SED	
Hans Waldmann	SED	
Rosel Walther	NDPD	
Horst Wambutt	SED	
Albert Wappler	FDGB	
Hans Watzek	DBD	
Wolfgang Weichelt	SED	
Werner Weichenhain	LDPD	
Johannes Weidauer	NDPD	
Margot Weilert	SED	
Gerhard Weiss	SED	deceased on January 7, 1986
Wilhelm Weißgärber	DBD	
Herbert Weiz	SED	
Christine Weller	DFD	on July 4, 1985, for Dept. core moved up
Gert Wendelborn	CDU	
Karl-Heinz Werner	DBD	
Monika Werner	SED	
Harald Werthmann	LDPD	deceased on September 5, 1984
Gerolf Wetzel	DBD	
Ruth Weyh	LDPD	
Günter Wiedemann	LDPD	
Gerda Wiefel	SED	
Hans Wiesner	SED	
Christine Wieynk	CDU	
Karin-Christiane Wilhelm	CDU	
Richard O. Wilhelm	LDPD	
Herbert Willem	SED	
Hans-Joachim Willerding	FDJ	
Hanna Wolf	LDPD	
Manfred Wolf	FDGB	
Karin Wolff	FDJ	
Lothar Wolter	LDPD	
Dieter-Gerhardt Worm	CDU	
Werner Wünschmann	CDU	
Henry Zahlten	FDGB	
Gisela Zepp	DFD	
Herbert Ziegenhahn	SED	
Heinz Ziegner	SED	
Brigitte Zenert	DBD	
Johannes Zillig	CDU	
Hermann Zweigler	LDPD	
