= Bruno Kiesler =

German politician (1925–2011)

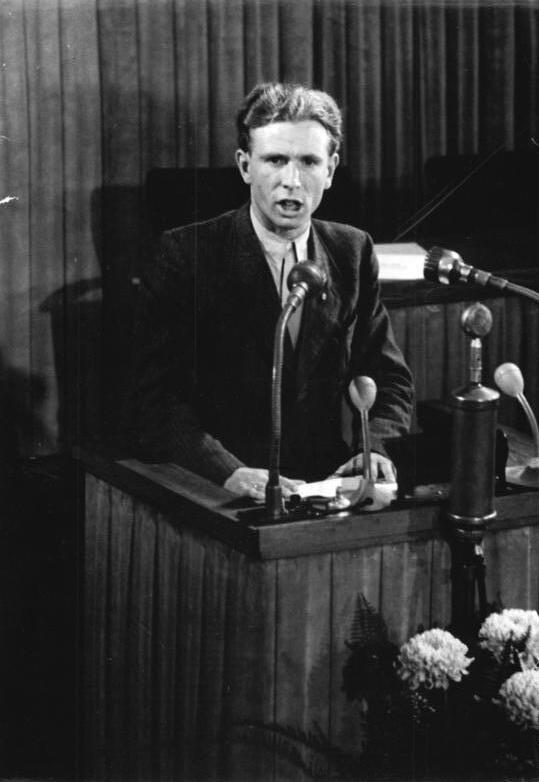
- Kiesler in 1951

Head of the Agriculture Department of the Central Committee
- In office 8 April 1959 – 11 November 1981
- Secretary: Erich Mückenberger; Gerhard Grüneberg; Werner Felfe
- Deputy: Heinz Besser; Wolfgang Mühlstädt; Christoph Ostmann
- Preceded by: Karl Götz
- Succeeded by: Bruno Lietz
Volkskammer
Member of the Volkskammer
In office 26 November 1971 – 16 June 1986
Preceded by	Hermann Matern
Succeeded by	Werner Heilemann
Constituency	Burg, Schönebeck, Staßfurt, Zerbst
In office 8 November 1950 – 26 November 1971
Preceded by	Constituency established
Succeeded by	Heinz Ziegner
Constituency	Hagenow, Ludwigslust, Perleberg

Personal details
- Born: Bruno Kiesler; 22 December 1925 Stallupönen, East Prussia, Free State of Prussia, Weimar Republic (now Nesterov, Russia)
- Died: 10 June 2011 (aged 85) Berlin, Germany
- Party: Socialist Unity Party (1946–1989)
- Other political affiliations: Communist Party of Germany (1946)
- Education: Landesparteischule Ballenstedt; Deutsche Akademie für Staats- und Rechtswissenschaft „Walter Ulbricht“; Institut für Agrarökonomie (Dipl. agr. oec.)
- Occupation: Politician; Party Functionary; Farmer
- Awards: Patriotic Order of Merit, 1st class; Banner of Labor; Hero of Labour
- Central institution membership: 1971–1986: Full member, Central Committee; 1967–1971: Candidate member, Central Committee; Other offices held: 1982–1990: Secretary, League for Peoples' Friendship of the GDR; 1956–1957: Acting Chairman, Council of Bezirk Magdeburg; 1953–1959: Deputy Chairman for Agriculture, Council of Bezirk Magdeburg

Bruno Kiesler (22 December 1925 – 10 June 2011) was a German farmer, politician and party functionary of the Socialist Unity Party (SED).

Kiesler rose to prominence after being hailed as a Stakhanovite activist in East German agriculture.

He held various positions in the GDR's agricultural sector, ultimately serving as head of the powerful SED Central Committee Agriculture Department for over twenty years before being pushed out in late 1981 for disagreeing with the SED's economic policies.

== Life and career ==
=== Early career ===
Kiesler was born in the East Prussian town of Stallupönen to a telegraph worker. He completed an apprenticeship as an automobile mechanic from 1940 to 1942 after attending elementary school. From 1942 until May 1945, he was conscripted into the Reich Labor Service and the Wehrmacht. He was captured by the British in Eutin.

After returning from captivity, he initially worked as a coachman on the estate of the von Itzenplitz family in 1945 and became the chairman of the Anti-Fascist Youth Committee in Grieben. Following the land reform, he became a tractor operator at the Peasants Mutual Aid Association in Grieben in 1946.

In March 1946, he joined the Communist Party of Germany (KPD), which was forcibly merged with the Social Democratic Party (SPD) to form the Socialist Unity Party (SED) a month later, and the Free German Youth (FDJ).

For a short period, he worked on his father-in-law's farm, and when the state established Machinery Rental Stations (MAS) in 1949, he returned to work as a tractor operator.

=== Stakhanovite activist ===
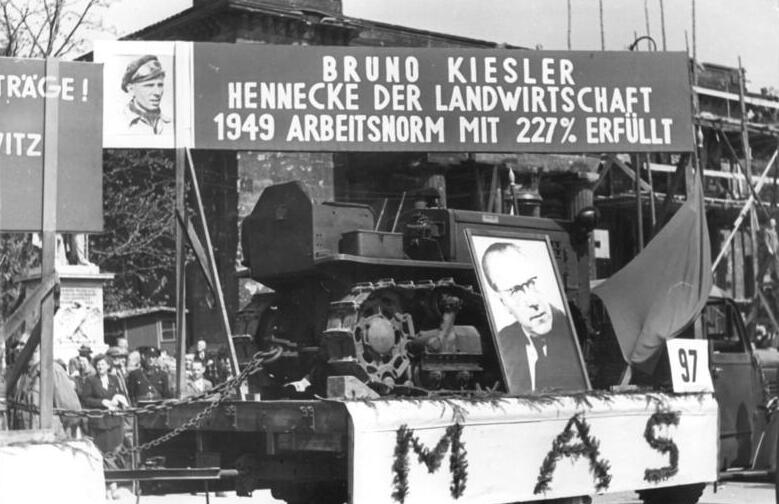
Kiesler being praised at a May Day parade in 1950

At the Grieben branch of MAS Köckte, he followed the FDJ Central Council's call "FDJ members on tractors" and achieved top productivity with a norm fulfillment of 200 percent by using equipment coupling, modeled after Soviet methods.

For this, he was groomed as a Stakhanovite activist, receiving the title of Young Activist on 11 October 1949, was referred to as the "Hennecke of Agriculture" and was awarded the National Prize of the GDR, Class III for Science and Technology, by President Wilhelm Pieck on 7 October 1950.

=== Bezirk Magdeburg career ===
On 4 December 1949, he was elected to the board of the Saxony-Anhalt SED. In July 1950, he participated in the III. Party Congress of the SED in Berlin and was elected to the Congress' Presidium.

In 1950, he additionally became a member of the federal executive board of the Free German Trade Union Federation (FDGB) (until 1955) and later that year was made a member of the first Volkskammer, nominally representing rural constituencies, first southwestern Bezirk Schwerin, then southern Bezirk Magdeburg. Initially, he was part of the FDJ faction and, from 1957, the SED faction.

From 1950 to 1952, he served as Chairman of the Saxony-Anhalt Industrial Union for Agriculture and Forestry. He attended the SED State Party School in Ballenstedt in 1951, after which he was made head of the Bezirk Magdeburg Machine-Tractor Stations (MTS) Administration.

In 1953, he was promoted to be deputy chairman of the Council of Bezirk Magdeburg, the Bezirk's government, responsible for agriculture. From 1956 to 1957, he served as acting chairman of the Bezirk government in place of Paul Hentschel, who was studying in Moscow. He concurrently was a full member of the Bezirk Magdeburg SED leadership and, starting in 1955, a member of the FDJ Central Council.

From 1953 to 1957, he pursued distance education at the German Academy of Political Science and Law "Walter Ulbricht" in Potsdam-Babelsberg, de facto a Marxist-Leninist cadre factory of the ruling SED, and the Institute for Agricultural Economics in Bernburg, graduating as an agricultural economist (Dipl. agr. oec.).

=== SED Central Committee ===
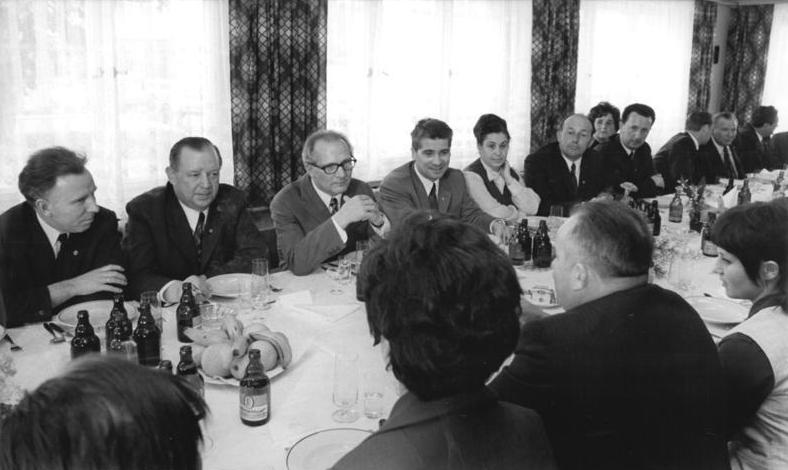
Kiesler (left) and Erich Honecker (center) speaking to farmers of the LPG Dedelow in June 1972

In April 1959, the SED Central Committee appointed Kiesler head of the Central Committee Agriculture Department. Additionally he was elected to the Central Committee of the SED as a candidate member in April 1967 (VII. Party Congress), being elevated to full member in June 1971 (VIII. Party Congress). From 1968 to 1983, he was a member of the Academy of Agricultural Sciences of the GDR.

During his over twenty-year-long tenure as one of the most influential East German agriculture policymakers, Kiesler played a significant role in introducing industrial-style production methods and in separating plant and animal production, the later ultimately proving to be unsuccessful.

Kiesler was awarded the Patriotic Order of Merit in Silver in 1963 and 1965 and in Gold in 1985, the Banner of Labor twice as well as the Hero of Labour title in 1974.

=== Long retirement ===
In November 1981, he was removed as head of the Agricultural Department due to conflicts with the SED's economic policies and was succeeded by Bruno Lietz.

Kiesler had to retire from both the Central Committee and the Volkskammer in April (XI. Party Congress) and June 1986 respectively. He was initially given a job in 1981 at the Academy of Agricultural Sciences as director of the newly established project technology institute for rational energy use. In 1982, he was transferred to a politically irrelevant position at the League for Peoples' Friendship of the GDR, a SED-controlled mass organization, initially as secretary, additionally chairing the organisation's Audit Commission from 1986.

He retired shortly after German reunification, on 1 December 1990, and died in June 2011 at the age of 85.
