= Bruno Lietz =

German politician (1925–2005)

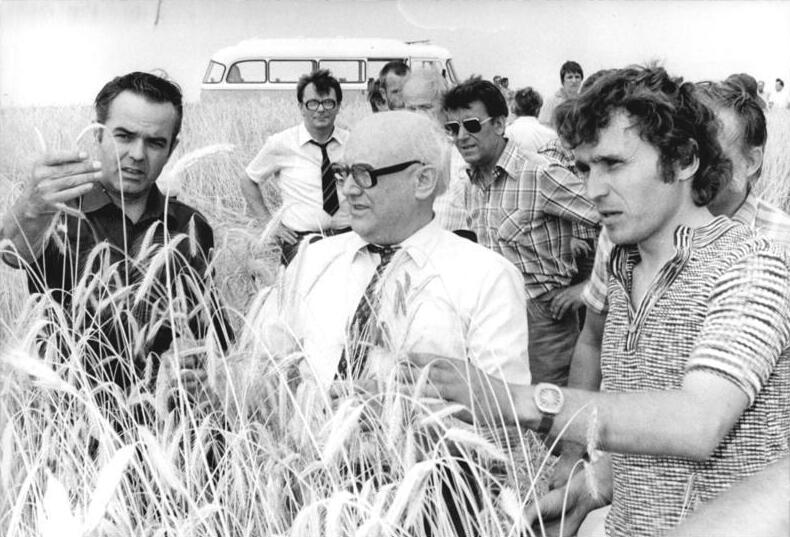
- Lietz (center) in 1983

Minister for Agriculture, Forestry and Food
- In office 3 December 1982 – 18 November 1989
- Chairman of the Council of Ministers: Willi Stoph
- Preceded by: Heinz Kuhrig
- Succeeded by: Hans Watzek

Head of the Agriculture Department of the Central Committee
- In office 19 November 1981 – 25 November 1982
- Secretary: Werner Felfe
- Deputy: Heinz Besser; Heinz Drescher
- Preceded by: Bruno Kiesler
- Succeeded by: Helmut Semmelmann
Volkskammer
Member of the Volkskammer for Artem, Nebra, Querfurt, Saalkreis
In office 16 June 1986 – 5 April 1990
Preceded by	Heinz Kuhrig
Succeeded by	Constituency abolished

Personal details
- Born: Bruno Lietz; 22 November 1925 Wormstedt, State of Thuringia, Weimar Republic (now Bad Sulza, Thuringia, Germany)
- Died: 11 May 2005 (aged 79) Berlin, Germany
- Party: Socialist Unity Party (1949–1989)
- Other political affiliations: Nazi Party (1943–1945)
- Education: Institut für Agrarökonomie (Dipl. agr. oec.)
- Occupation: Politician; Party Functionary; Civil Servant; Farmworker
- Awards: Banner of Labor; Order of Karl Marx
- Central institution membership: 1982–1989: Full member, Central Committee; 1963–1982: Candidate member, Central Committee; Other offices held: 1972–1981: Deputy Chairman, State Planning Commission; 1961–1972: Secretary for Agriculture, Socialist Unity Party in Bezirk Rostock

Bruno Lietz (22 November 1925 – 11 May 2005) was a German politician and party functionary of the Socialist Unity Party (SED).

One of a few former Nazis to have a political career in East Germany, Lietz rose to become an influential agriculture policymaker in the 1980s, briefly serving as head of the powerful Agriculture Department of the SED Central Committee and later Agriculture Minister before having to step down during the Peaceful Revolution.

== Life and career ==
=== Early career ===
Lietz completed training as an auto mechanic from 1940 to 1943.

On 13 January 1943, he applied for membership in the Nazi Party (NSDAP) and was accepted on April 20 (Hitler's birthday) of the same year (membership number 9,365,258). He served as a soldier in the German Wehrmacht until 1945.

From 1945 to 1947, he worked as an auto mechanic in Apolda, then as a tractor operator at the VdgB in Wormstedt until 1949, and subsequently as a tractor operator, assistant, and technical director at the Machine Rental Stations (MTS) in Apolda, Holbach, and Krölpa until 1952.

Between 1952 and 1954, Lietz served as a sector leader for political mass work in the Ministry of Agriculture and Forestry.

Lietz, who had joined the ruling Socialist Unity Party (SED) in 1949, became a full-time party functionary in 1954, working as a staff member and later as a sector leader for Agricultural Production Cooperatives (LPGs) and MTS in the Agriculture Department of the SED Central Committee. In 1961, he was transferred to the Bezirk Rostock SED as secretary for agriculture. Lietz further climbed the party ranks when he was elected as a candidate member of the Central Committee of the SED in January 1963 (VI. Party Congress).

In 1972, he returned to the state apparatus as a deputy chairman of the State Planning Commission, responsible for agriculture and food industry. He additionally became a member of the Council for Agricultural Production and Food Economy, successor of the GDR's Ministry of Agriculture, the same year.

Lietz was awarded the Banner of Labor in 1976.

=== SED Central Committee and Agriculture Minister ===
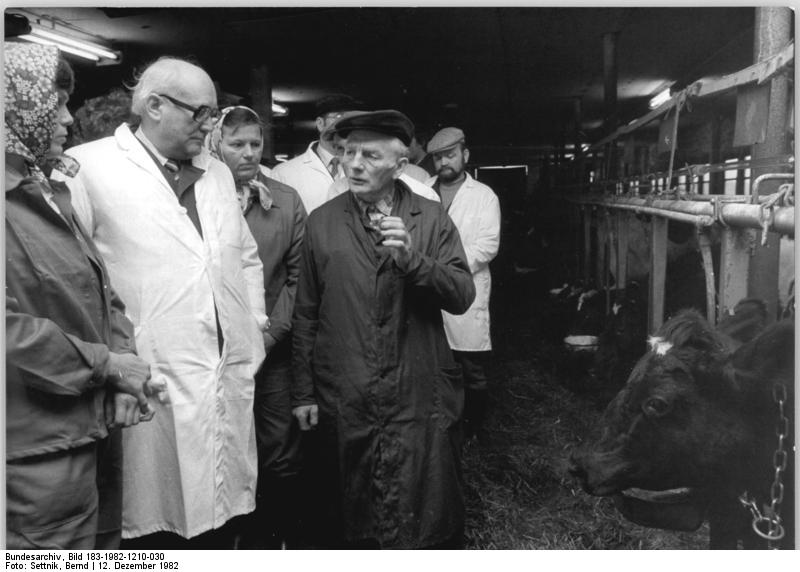
Lietz (left) visiting farmers in Warlow in December 1982

In November 1981, Lietz acceded to head of the SED Agriculture Department. Longtime head and famed Stakhanovite activist Bruno Kiesler officially retired of his own will, but was actually dismissed due to his disagreements with the SED's economic policies.

Lietz additionally rose to become a full Central Committee member in 1982.

After about a year as department head and in what was at least technically a demotion – GDR ministries where subservient to their respective SED Central Committee department –, he replaced Heinz Kuhrig as minister for agriculture, Forestry and Food in December 1982.

Kuhrig had been officially relieved of his duties "at his own request", but he was likely forced into retirement. Internally, he had been accused of having to import grain for animal feed purposes.

Lietz additionally became a member of the Volkskammer in June 1986, nominally representing a rural constituency in western Bezirk Halle.

Lietz was again awarded the Banner of Labor in 1984, as well as the Order of Karl Marx in 1985.

=== Death ===
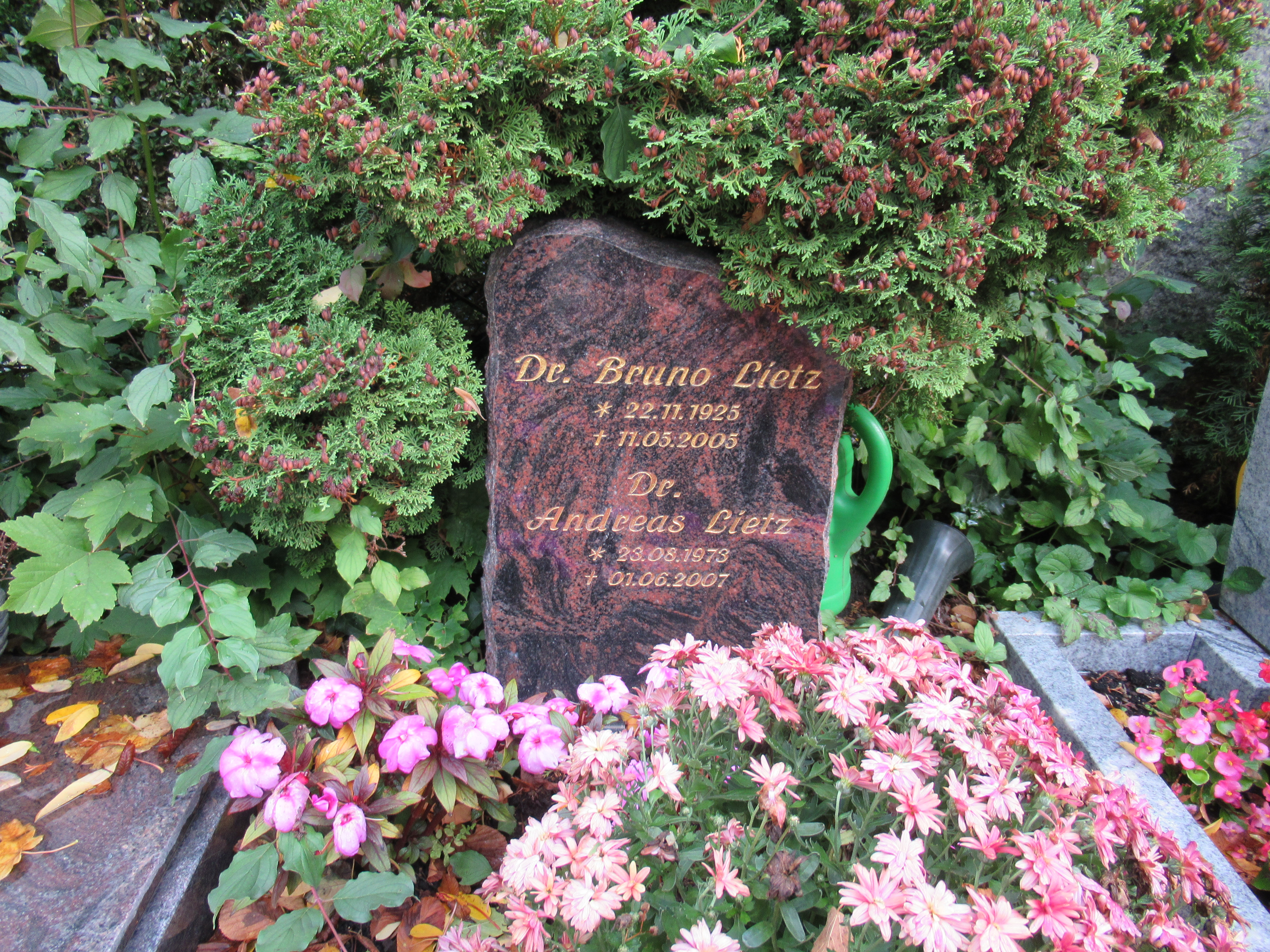
Lietz's grave in 2019

During the Peaceful Revolution, on 7 November 1989, he resigned alongside rest of the government led by Willi Stoph and retired in 1990.

He died in 2005 and was buried in the Berlin-Kaulsdorf cemetery.
