= Helmut Semmelmann =

German politician (born 1934)

Secretary for Agriculture of the Central Committee Secretariat
- In office 10 November 1989 – 3 December 1989
- General Secretary: Egon Krenz
- Preceded by: Johannes Chemnitzer
- Succeeded by: Position abolished

Head of the Agriculture Department of the Central Committee
- In office 25 November 1982 – 3 December 1989
- Secretary: Werner Felfe; Werner Krolikowski; Johannes Chemnitzer
- Deputy: Heinz Besser; Heinz Drescher
- Preceded by: Bruno Lietz
- Succeeded by: Position abolished
Volkskammer
Member of the Volkskammer for Brandenburg-Stadt, Brandenburg-Land, Belzig, Rathenow
In office 16 June 1986 – 5 April 1990
Preceded by	Heinz Hofmann
Succeeded by	Constituency abolished

Personal details
- Born: Helmut Semmelmann; 8 August 1934 (age 92) Gera, State of Thuringia, Nazi Germany (now Germany)
- Party: Socialist Unity Party (1955–1989)
- Education: Timiryazev Academy of Agriculture (Dipl.-Landwirt); "Karl Marx" Party Academy
- Occupation: Politician; Party Functionary; Farmer
- Awards: Patriotic Order of Merit, 1st class; Banner of Labor
- Central institution membership: 1986–1989: Full member, Central Committee; Other offices held: 1981–1982: First Secretary, Socialist Unity Party in Central Organs of Agriculture and Food Industry

Helmut Semmelmann (born 8 August 1934) is a former German farmer, politician and party functionary of the Socialist Unity Party (SED).

In the German Democratic Republic, he served as the longtime head of the powerful Agriculture Department of the SED Central Committee. During the Wende, he also briefly served in the Central Committee Secretariat as Secretary responsible for Agriculture.

== Life and career ==
=== Early career ===
The son of a worker, after attending elementary and secondary school and graduating from high school, he studied at the Timiryazev Academy of Agriculture in Moscow from 1953 to 1958, earning a degree in agricultural sciences (Diplomlandwirt).

Semmelmann, who joined the ruling Socialist Unity Party (SED) in 1955 during his studies, initially worked from 1958 to 1961 as a scientific assistant at the Machine-Tractor Station (MTS) Brahmenau, and then for a short time as the director of the MTS Schlöben.

In 1961, he became a staff member of the SED district leadership in Gera, where he was head of the agriculture department from 1962 to 1963. In 1963, he moved to the Central Committee of the SED as a political staff member.

From 1972 to 1973, he attended the "Karl Marx" Party Academy and then was sector head in the Central Committee of the SED from 1974 to 1981.

From 1981 to 1982, he was the First Secretary of the SED district leadership for central organs of agriculture and the food industry, succeeding Fritz Klopprogge.

=== SED Central Committee ===
In November 1982, he was appointed head of the Agriculture Department of the Central Committee of the SED, succeeding Bruno Lietz, who replaced Heinz Kuhrig as Minister for Agriculture, Forestry and Food. Semmelmann held this position until the dissolution of the SED in 1989.

Semmelmann was elected as a full member of the Central Committee of the SED in April 1986 (XI. Party Congress), serving until its collective resignation in December 1989. He additionally became member of the Volkskammer in 1986, nominally representing a constituency in southwestern Bezirk Potsdam. He was the first deputy chairman of the Committee for Agriculture, Forestry and Food.

In 1974, Semmelmann was awarded the Patriotic Order of Merit in bronze, in 1984 in Gold and the Banner of Labor.

=== Peaceful Revolution ===
During the Peaceful Revolution, on 10 November 1989, Semmelmann was elected to the Central Committee Secretariat as Secretary responsible for Agriculture, succeeding Johannes Chemnitzer, who was forced to resign only two days after being elected.

Semmelmann's career advancement would prove to be short-lived, as the SED quickly lost power. At its last session on 3 December 1989, the Central Committee elected Semmelmann to a commission tasked with analyzing the causes of the crisis in the SED and in society.
