= Georg Ewald =

East German politician (1926–1973)

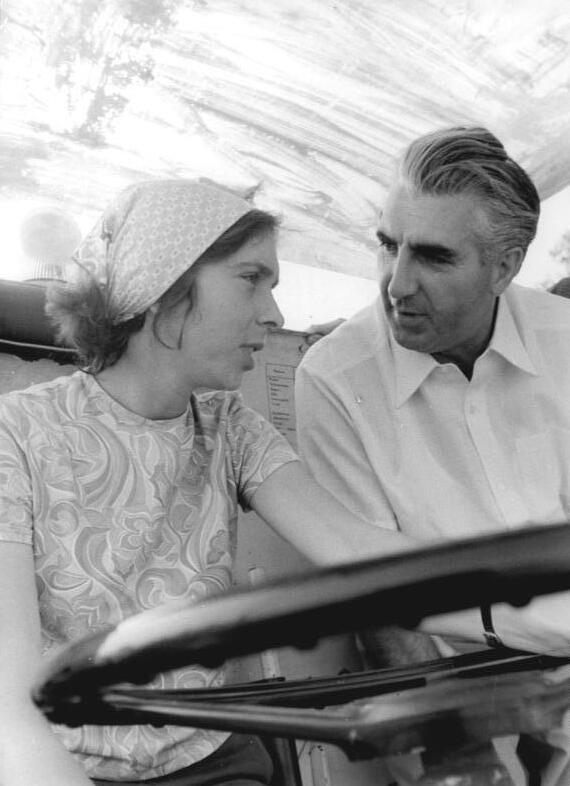
- Ewald (right) in 1972

Minister for Agriculture, Forestry and Food (Note: as Chairman of the Agricultural Council from 1963 to 1968 and the Council for Agricultural Production and Food Economy from 1968 to 1971)
- In office 9 February 1963 – 14 September 1973
- Chairman of the Council of Ministers: Otto Grotewohl; Willi Stoph
- Preceded by: Karl-Heinz Bartsch
- Succeeded by: Heinz Kuhrig

First Secretary of the Socialist Unity Party in Bezirk Neubrandenburg
- In office October 1960 – 16 February 1963
- Second Secretary: Hans Gerlach
- Preceded by: Max Steffen
- Succeeded by: Johannes Chemnitzer
Volkskammer
Member of the Volkskammer for Wolgast, Greifswald, Rügen, Grimmen, Stralsund-Land
In office 13 November 1963 – 14 September 1973
Preceded by	multi-member district
Succeeded by	Guido Thoms

Personal details
- Born: Georg Ewald; 30 October 1926 Buchholz, Province of Pomerania, Free State of Prussia, Weimar Republic (now Gremersdorf-Buchholz, Mecklenburg-Vorpommern, Germany)
- Died: 14 September 1973 (aged 46) near Gotha, Bezirk Erfurt, East Germany
- Resting place: Memorial of the Socialists, Friedrichsfelde Central Cemetery
- Party: Socialist Unity Party (1946–1973)
- Education: "Karl Marx" Party Academy
- Occupation: Politician; Party Functionary; Farmworker
- Awards: Medal of Merit of the GDR; Patriotic Order of Merit, 2nd class; Banner of Labor
- Central institution membership: 1963–1973: Candidate member, Politburo of the Central Committee; 1963–1973: Full member, Central Committee; Other offices held: 1955–1960: First Secretary, Socialist Unity Party in Kreis Rügen; 1954–1955: First Secretary, Socialist Unity Party in Kreis Bad Doberan; 1949–1950: Mayor, Buchholz

Georg Ewald (30 October 1926 – 14 September 1973) was an East German politician and high-ranking party functionary of the Socialist Unity Party (SED).

Ewald briefly served as the First Secretary of the SED in Bezirk Neubrandenburg and, most notably, as the longtime Agriculture Minister of East Germany and as a candidate member of the Politburo of the Central Committee of the SED. He died in a car accident in 1973.

== Life and career ==
=== Early career ===
Georg Ewald was born on 30 October 1926 in Buchholz (now a part of Gremersdorf-Buchholz) in the Prussian Province of Pomerania. He attended agricultural school and then worked at his parents' farm until being drafted into the Wehrmacht in 1943. After the war, he was a farmworker. Ewald, who had joined the Free German Youth (FDJ) and the ruling Socialist Unity Party (SED) in 1946, was made the mayor of his hometown in 1949. After only a year, he was promoted to the local government of the district of Stralsund with responsibility for agriculture.

From 1953 to 1954, Ewald attended a one-year course at the SED's "Karl Marx" Party Academy in Berlin, after which he was made First Secretary of the SED in the district of Bad Doberan for a year, transferring to the more populous district of Rügen in 1955.

In October 1960, he succeeded Max Steffen as First Secretary of the Bezirk Neubrandenburg SED. Steffen was demoted to party secretary in the Lübbenau coal power plant, having been reprimanded.

In January 1963 (VI. Party Congress), he was made a full member of the SED Central Committee and a candidate member of its Politburo, the de facto highest leadership body in East Germany.

=== Agriculture Minister ===
In February 1963, the GDR's Ministry of Agriculture was abolished and replaced by the Agricultural Council, later renamed Council for Agricultural Production and Food Economy, its chairman retaining minister rank. Karl-Heinz Bartsch, appointed on 7 February, was forced to resign only two days later, on 9 February, after West German media revealed that he had concealed his membership in the Waffen-SS.

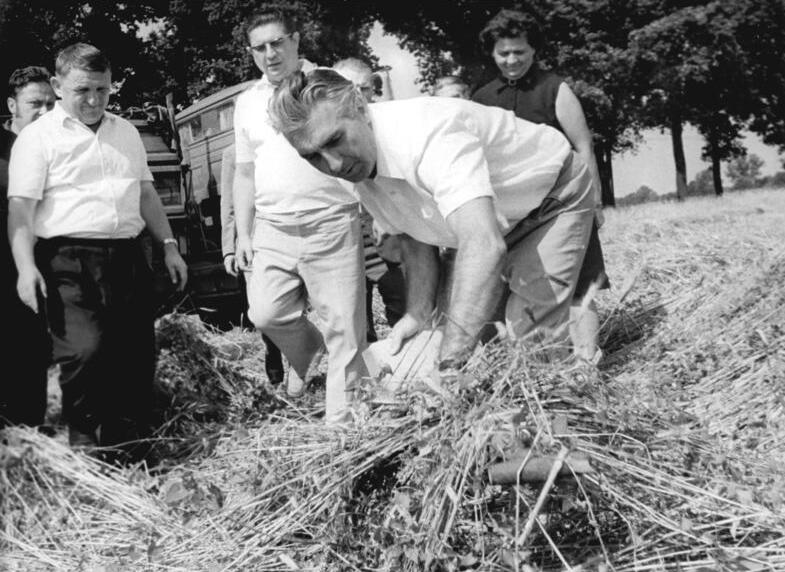
Ewald (center) visiting farmers in Löwenberg in August 1972

Ewald replaced him, additionally becoming a member of the Presidium of the Council of Ministers and a member of the Volkskammer later that year, nominally representing a constituency in northeastern Bezirk Rostock. Ewald remained minister when the Ministry was reestablished as Ministry for Agriculture, Forestry and Food.

His ten-year tenure was marked by further collectivization efforts. During his leadership, he frequently clashed with SED Agriculture Secretary Gerhard Grüneberg, who implemented many ideas aimed at industrializing the collectively managed agriculture in the 1960s. The most significant aspect of these reforms was the gradual separation of animal and plant production, which Ewald opposed and which were eventually reversed in the 1980s.

=== Death ===
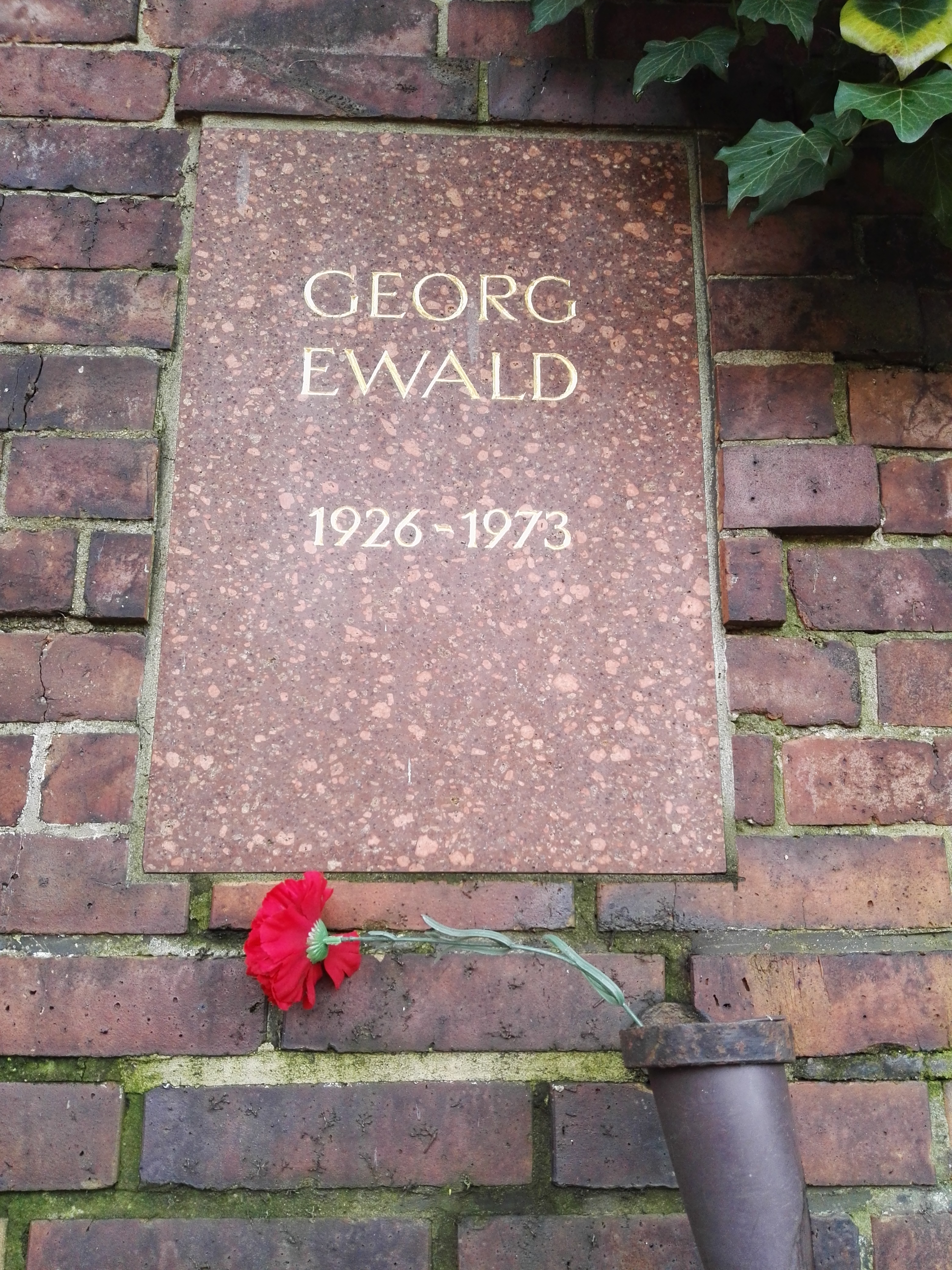
Ewald's grave in 2016

Ewald died in a car accident on the morning of 14 September 1973, near Gotha. Two other SED functionaries, members of the Bezirk Erfurt SED leadership, also died in the accident.

Immediately afterwards, the Stasi confiscated documents relating to his activities as candidate member of the Politburo of the SED Central Committee and his ministerial office from the work rooms.

He was given a state funeral and was interred at the Memorial of the Socialists of the Friedrichsfelde Central Cemetery in Berlin-Lichtenberg.

In Gotha's local vernacular, the stretch of road where Ewald died, a long curve of the B 247 between the A4 motorway exit and the entrance to Gotha, is still known today as Minister's Curve (German: Ministerkurve).
