= Drechsel =

Drechsel may refer to:

== Persons with the surname ==
- Bernd Drechsel (born 1953), German athlete (wrestling)
- Gottfried Drechsel (1928–2009), East German functionary and politician
- Herwig Drechsel (born 1973), Austrian athlete (football)
- Jeremias Drechsel or Hieremias Drechsel or Jeremias Drexel (1581–1638), Jesuit writer
- Sammy Drechsel (1925–1986), German political comedian
- Thomas Drechsel (born 1987), German actor
- Viktor Drechsel (born 1960), Italian athlete (pole vault)
- Walter Drechsel (1902–1977), German politician

== See also ==
- Drexel (disambiguation)
