= Gerhard Baumgärtel =

German politician (1931–1997)

Minister for Construction and Housing
- In office 18 November 1989 – 12 April 1990
- Chairman of the Council of Ministers: Hans Modrow
- Preceded by: Wolfgang Junker (Construction)
- Succeeded by: Axel Viehweger (Construction, Urban Development, and Housing)

Lord Mayor of Weimar
- In office 21 Oktober 1982 – 17 November 1989
- Preceded by: Franz Kirchner
- Succeeded by: Volkhardt Germer (acting)
Volkskammer
Member of the Volkskammer for Arnstadt, Apolda, Weimar-Stadt, Weimar-Land
In office 16 June 1986 – 5 April 1990
Preceded by	multi-member district
Succeeded by	Constituency abolished

Personal details
- Born: Gerhard Baumgärtel; 25 November 1931 Reumtengrün, Free State of Saxony, Weimar Republic (now Germany)
- Died: 27 July 1997 (aged 65) Weimar, Thuringia, Germany
- Party: Christian Democratic Union of Germany (1990–1997)
- Other political affiliations: Christian Democratic Union (East Germany) (1969–1990)
- Education: Fachschule für Angewandte Kunst Erfurt; Hochschule für Architektur und Bauwesen Weimar (Dr.-Ing.); Technical University of Budapest
- Occupation: Politician; Civil Servant; Architect; Academic

Gerhard Baumgärtel (25 November 1931 – 27 July 1997) was a German architect, university lecturer and politician of the East German Christian Democratic Union (CDU).

In the German Democratic Republic, he served as the longtime Lord Mayor of Weimar in the 1980s and as the GDR's penultimate Construction Minister during the Peaceful Revolution.

== Life and career ==
=== Early career ===
After an apprenticeship as a carpenter, Baumgärtel studied interior design at the Erfurt School of Applied Arts and from 1954 to 1960 at the University of Architecture and Civil Engineering Weimar (HAB).

After working as an architect and project manager at VEB Polygraph Leipzig, he was a research assistant at the HAB from 1962 to 1969, senior assistant from 1969 to 1974, and lecturer after an additional study program at the Budapest University of Technology until 1982, then honorary professor.

In 1965, he received his doctorate (Dr.-Ing.) at the HAB Weimar with the thesis "Room design in compact windowless industrial buildings with special consideration of basic work hygiene requirements". In 1969 he habilitated there with the thesis "Investigations on the design of the working environment in industrial buildings - A contribution to technical-scientific design principles and their methodological application in the design process to increase the building-technical use value requirements for industrial buildings".

=== Bloc party politician ===
Baumgärtel joined the East German Christian Democratic Union (CDU), a bloc party beholden to the ruling Socialist Unity Party (SED), in 1969. Since 1977 he was a member of the party Main Executive Committee, and since 1984 a member of the Presidium of the Main Executive Committee.

In Oktober 1982, he was made Lord Mayor of Weimar, a position traditionally held by a member of the CDU, succeeding Franz Kirchner, who retired. Baumgärtel additionally became member of the Volkskammer in 1986.

=== Peaceful Revolution ===
During the Wende, he served as Minister for Construction and Housing in the transitional government of Hans Modrow.

Afterwards, Baumgärtel worked as an architect until retiring in 1995. He died in 1997 at the age of 65 in Weimar.
