= Heinz Kuhrig =

East German politician (1929–2001)

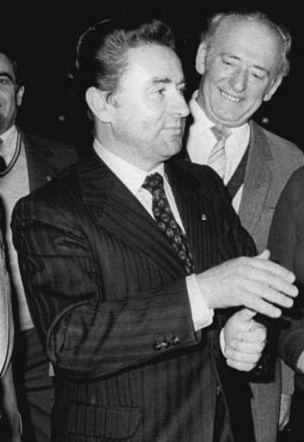
- Kuhrig in 1981

Minister for Agriculture, Forestry and Food
- In office 3 October 1973 – 3 December 1982
- Chairman of the Council of Ministers: Horst Sindermann; Willi Stoph
- Preceded by: Georg Ewald
- Succeeded by: Bruno Lietz
Volkskammer
Member of the Volkskammer
In office 16 June 1986 – 5 April 1990
Preceded by	Käte Niederkirchner
Succeeded by	Constituency abolished
Constituency	Glauchau, Hohenstein-Ernstthal, Reichenbach, Werdau, №3
In office 29 October 1976 – 16 June 1986
Preceded by	Siegfried Tannhäuser
Succeeded by	Bruno Lietz
Constituency	Artern, Nebra, Querfurt, Saalkreis, №1

Personal details
- Born: 4 March 1929 Strehla, Free State of Saxony, Weimar Republic (now Germany)
- Died: 13 September 2001 (aged 72) Berlin, Germany
- Cause of death: Suicide by firearm
- Party: Socialist Unity Party (1946–1989)
- Education: Leipzig University (Dipl.-Landwirt); CPSU Higher Party School "W. I. Lenin"
- Occupation: Politician; Civil Servant; Agricultural machinery mechanic
- Awards: Patriotic Order of Merit, 1st class; Banner of Labor
- Central institution membership: 1976–1989: Full member, Central Committee; 1971–1976: Full member, Central Auditing Commission; Other offices held: 1983–1990: Vice President, Society for German–Soviet Friendship; 1982–1990: General Secretary, Society for German–Soviet Friendship

Heinz Kuhrig (4 March 1929 – 13 September 2001) was an East German politician and party functionary of the Socialist Unity Party (SED).

Kuhrig served as the East Germany's Agriculture Minister in the 1970s following Georg Ewald's death in a car accident.

He was forced into retirement in 1982 and committed suicide after German reunification.

== Life and career ==
=== Early career ===
The son of a working-class family, Kuhrig completed an apprenticeship as an industrial electrician from 1943 to 1945 after attending elementary school and worked as an agricultural machinery mechanic from 1945 to 1946.

From 1946 to 1947, he attended a preparatory school and subsequently studied agriculture at Leipzig University, graduating in 1952 with a degree in agricultural sciences (Diplomlandwirt).

Kuhrig, who had joined the ruling Socialist Unity Party (SED) during his studies in 1946, thereafter worked in the Central Committee Agriculture Department.

In 1961, he was made director of the Institute for Agricultural Engineering of the German Academy of Agricultural Sciences (now Leibniz Institute for Agricultural Engineering) in Potsdam-Bornim. Two years later, in June 1963, he joined the Agriculture Council, successor of the Ministry of Agriculture, as first deputy chairman. From 1964 to 1968, he was also a member of the East German Council of Ministers.

After studying at the CPSU Higher Party School "W. I. Lenin" in Moscow for a year, he returned to the now renamed Council for Agricultural Production and Food Economy as state secretary in 1968. He retained his role when the Ministry of Agriculture was reestablished as Ministry for Agriculture, Forestry and Food in January 1971. In June 1971 (VIII. Party Congress), Kuhrig was also made a full member of the Central Auditing Commission of the SED.

=== Agriculture Minister ===
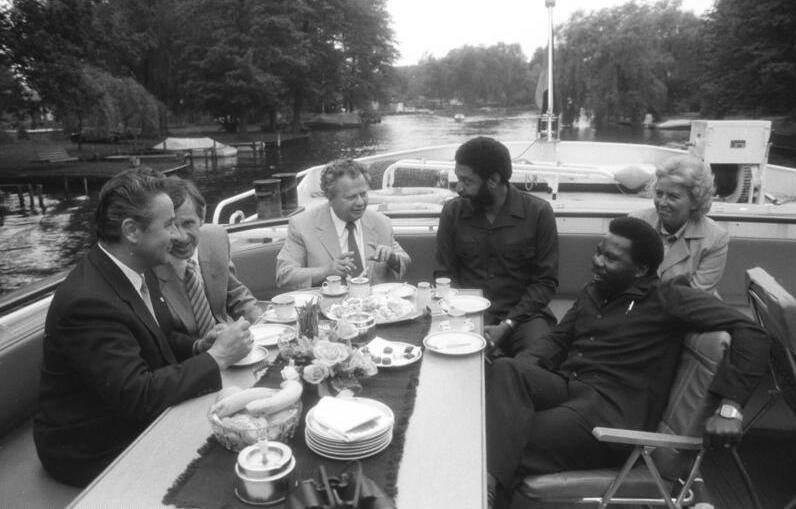
Kuhrig (left) on a boat trip with Grenadian revolutionary Maurice Bishop (right of center) in June 1982

In September 1973, longtime Agriculture Minister and Kuhrig's superior Georg Ewald died in a car accident.

Kuhrig was chosen to succeed him, additionally becoming a full member of the Central Committee of the SED in May 1976 (IX. Party Congress) (though also leaving the Central Auditing Commission), serving until its collective resignation in December 1989, and of the Volkskammer in October 1976, nominally representing rural constituencies, first in the western part of Bezirk Halle, then in the northwest of Bezirk Karl-Marx-Stadt.

=== Long retirement ===
In November 1982, Kuhrig was dismissed as Agriculture Minister. He was replaced by Bruno Lietz, who had only been made head of the Central Committee Agriculture Department a year prior.

While he had been officially relieved of their duties "at his own request", he was likely forced into retirement. Internally, he had been accused of having to import grain for animal feed purposes.

Kuhrig was allowed to remain in the Central Committee and Volkskammer, but was transferred to a politically irrelevant position at the Society for German–Soviet Friendship, a SED-controlled mass organization aiming to cultivate a positive image of the Soviet Union among the East German public. Kuhrig initially joined the DSF as General Secretary in December 1982, additionally becoming Vice President in May 1983.

After German reunification, Kuhrig lived withdrawn as a retiree in his Berlin-Müggelheim mansion. The mansion had been built illegally in a nature reserve in 1978 and was demolished in October 2022.

Kuhrig suffered from health problems in his later years. He shot himself with his hunting rifle on 13 September 2001. He was the second former East German minister to die from an apparent suicide after Construction Minister Wolfgang Junker.
