= Gremersdorf-Buchholz =

- Municipality
- Location of Gremersdorf-Buchholz within Vorpommern-Rügen district
- Interactive map of Gremersdorf-Buchholz
- Location within Germany Location within Mecklenburg-Vorpommern
- Coordinates: 54°09′N 12°54′E
- Country: Germany
- State: Mecklenburg-Vorpommern
- District: Vorpommern-Rügen
- Municipal assoc.: Franzburg-Richtenberg

Government
  - Mayor: Gudrun Romanus

Area
  - Total: 49.99 km^{2} (19.30 sq mi)
- Elevation: 19 m (62 ft)

Population (2025-12-31)
  - Total: 569
  - Density: 11.4/km^{2} (29.5/sq mi)
- Time zone: UTC+01:00 (CET)
  - Summer (DST): UTC+02:00 (CEST)
- Postal codes: 18461
- Dialling codes: 038320, 038322, 0383025
- Vehicle registration: NVP
- Website: www.amt-franzburg-richtenberg.de

Gremersdorf-Buchholz is a municipality in the Vorpommern-Rügen district, in Mecklenburg-Vorpommern, Germany.
