= Internationaler Bund =

Logo

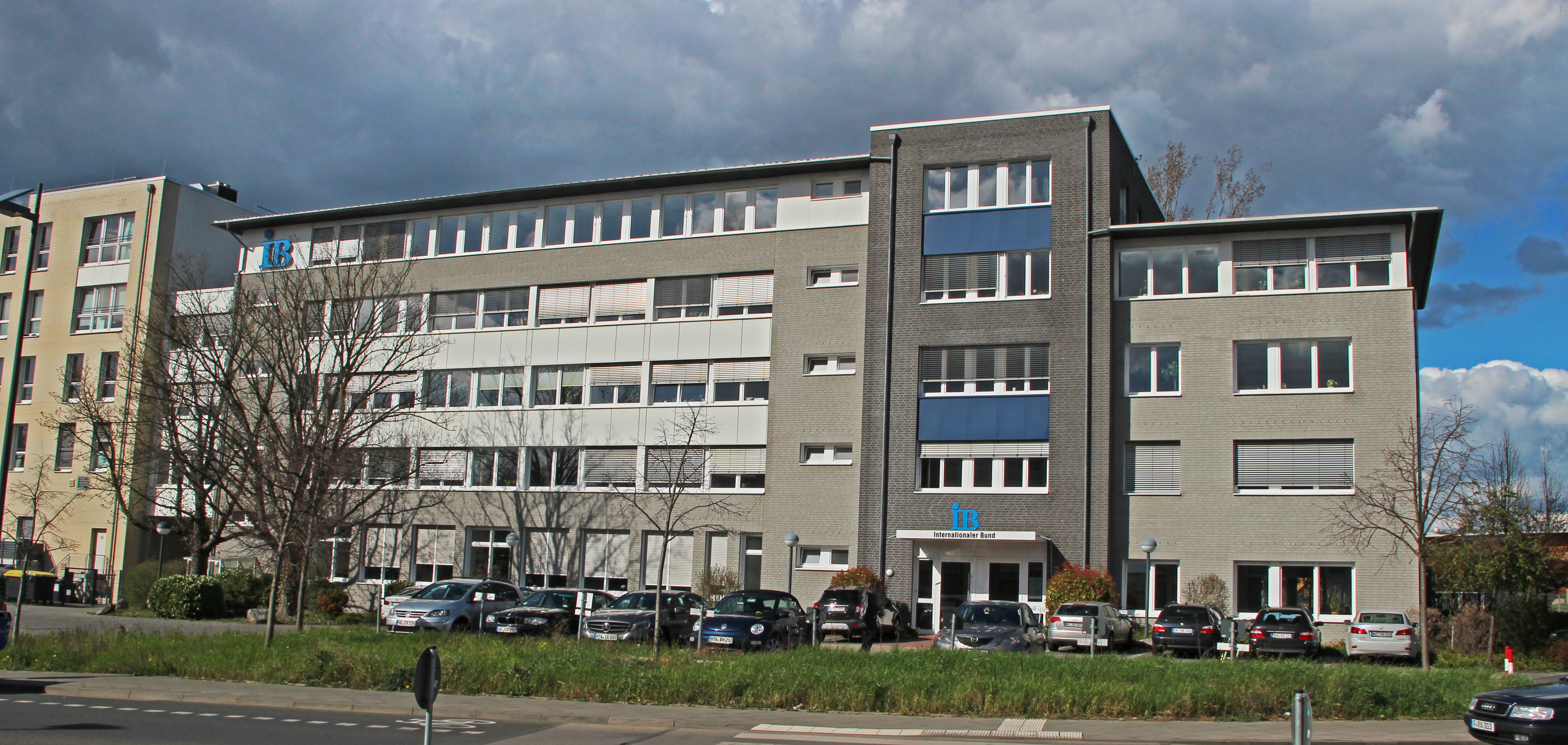
Headquarters in Frankfurt, Germany

The Internationaler Bund (commonly referred to as: IB) (English: International Federation) is a German politically non-aligned and non-denominational educational organisation. The IB was founded in 1949 and it is one of the largest service providers in the areas of social and educational programs for youth development in Europe with its registered voluntary association (German: Eingetragener Verein), its non-profit organizations, commercial companies, further education programs as well as schools and technical colleges. Today, the IB has around 700 facilities in more than 300 locations across Germany and promotes numerous educational activities abroad with educational institutions in China, Georgia and Turkey and with the Stiftung Internationaler Bund Polska in Poland, among others. The IB is headquartered in Frankfurt, Germany.

== See also ==
- Education in Germany
