= Johannes Chemnitzer =

East German politician (1929–2021)

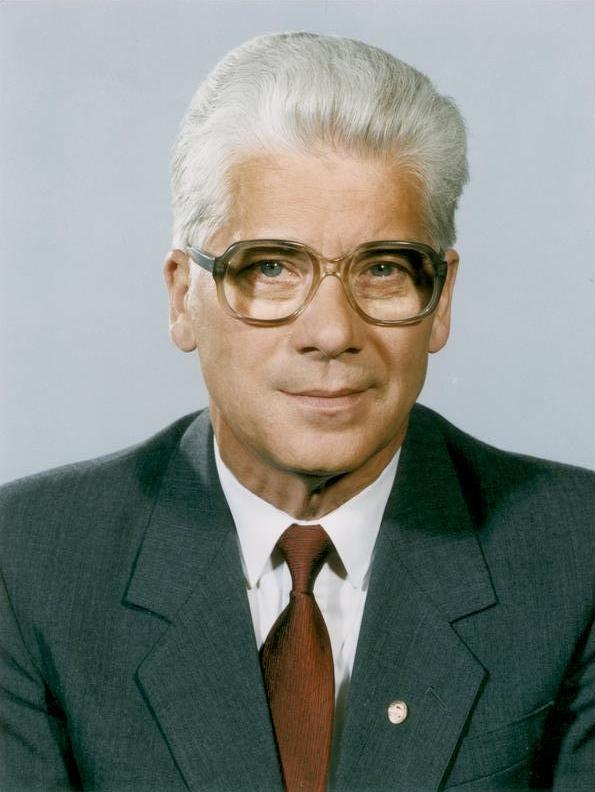
- Chemnitzer in 1988

Secretary for Agriculture of the Central Committee Secretariat
- In office 8 November 1989 – 10 November 1989
- General Secretary: Egon Krenz
- Preceded by: Werner Krolikowski
- Succeeded by: Helmut Semmelmann

First Secretary of the Socialist Unity Party in Bezirk Neubrandenburg
- In office 16 February 1963 – 14 November 1989
- Second Secretary: Hans Gerlach; Gerhard Zettler; Gerhard Müller; Werner Breitsprecher; Hans-Joachim Lüdeke
- Preceded by: Georg Ewald
- Succeeded by: Wolfgang Herrmann
Volkskammer
Member of the Volkskammer for Altentreptow, Anklam, Demmin, Malchin, Teterow
In office 14 November 1963 – 16 November 1989
Preceded by	multi-member district
Succeeded by	Wolfgang Mill

Personal details
- Born: Johannes Chemnitzer; 24 March 1929 Wildenfels, Free State of Saxony, Weimar Republic (now Germany)
- Died: 1 November 2021 (aged 92)
- Party: Socialist Unity Party (1946–1989)
- Education: CPSU Higher Party School
- Occupation: Politician; Party Functionary
- Awards: Patriotic Order of Merit
- Central institution membership: 1989: Candidate member, Politburo of the Central Committee; 1967–1989: Full member, Central Committee; Other offices held: 1958–1962: Secretary for Agriculture, Socialist Unity Party in Bezirk Gera

Hans Chemnitzer (born Wildenfels 24 March 1929 – 1 November 2021) was a former East German national and regional politician. He was relieved of his party duties on 10 November 1989 and then expelled from the ruling Socialist Unity Party (SED) on 13 December 1989.

== Life ==
Chemnitzer was born into a working-class family near Zwickau in the southern part of what was then central Germany, approximately half a year before the Great stock market Crash started across the Atlantic. The war ended when he was 16, and he completed his schooling at a business oriented school. He now found himself in the Soviet occupation zone of what remained of Germany: this, over the next four years, would be re-invented with Soviet political and military support to become a separate state, the German Democratic Republic, which was formally founded in 1949. In 1946 Chemnitzer became a member of the national Free German Youth (FDJ / Freie Deutsche Jugend) organisation and also joined the freshly created Socialist Unity Party of Germany (SED / Sozialistische Einheitspartei Deutschlands), the Soviet style political party, created in 1946, that would be the ruling political party in the new one-party state. Between 1948 and 1951 he studied at the Agriculture Academy in Zwickau and Elbisbach.

A career in government began with a position, which he held between 1955 and 1958, as Secretary for Agriculture with the regional party leadership in Zwickau. He then moved to Moscow, from 1958, studying at the Soviet Union's Party Academy, emerging with a degree in Social Sciences in 1961. After returning to East Germany, he served as Agriculture Secretary for the Party Leadership in Gera. In 1963 Chemnitzer succeeded Georg Ewald as First Secretary in the party regional leadership in Neubrandenburg, where he also sat as a member of the regional assembly, holding both positions till 1989.

At a national level he served, between 1963 and 1989, as a member of the National Legislative Assembly (Volkskammer). He had joined the party Central committee in 1967.

On 8 November 1989 he was still a candidate for Politburo membership. However, by 10 November 1989 his candidature had been withdrawn, while in Neubrandenburg the Central Committee had been persuaded to reverse his new election as the new Central Committee Agriculture Secretary. Chemnitzer's career progression had fallen victim to the rolling demise of the German Democratic Republic itself. As one of the political leaders on the spot, on 25 October Chemnitzer had called on a crowd of demonstrators not to look for solutions to their problems with further demonstrations: he was booed. On 9 November 1989 the Berlin Wall was breached. The German Democratic Republic was still hosting approximately 300,000 Soviet troops at this time, and after it became clear that the fraternal troops had no instructions to repress the demonstrations violently, the gate to reunification was seen to have been left open. Johannes Chemnitzer resigned his offices on 10 November and was expelled from The Party on 13 December 1989.

== Awards and honours ==
- 1974 Patriotic Order of Merit in Gold
- 1979 Order of Karl Marx
- 1984 Banner of Labor
