= Gottfried Drechsel =

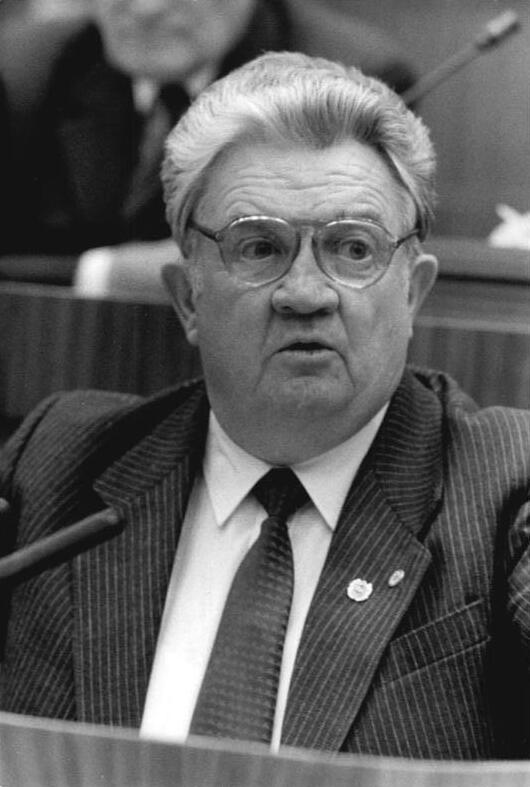
Gottfried Drechsel in 1986.

Gottfried Drechsel (20 January 1928 – 5 January 2009) was an East German functionary of the Peasants Mutual Aid Association and politician. He sat in the People's Chamber between 1986 and 1990.

== Life and career ==
Drechsel was born in Drebach, Ore Mountains into a farming family. He attended primary school, then an agricultural vocational training between 1942 and 1945. He was a farming assistant from 1945 to 1954, before he became an independent farmer. In 1948, he joined the Peasants Mutual Aid Association and the Socialist Unity Party of Germany (SED). From 1954, he was a member of the LPG Drebach; then a Feldbaubrigadier in the organisation from 1955 to 1958, then the chairman of the LPG from 1958 to 1963.

From 1963 to 1967, Dreschel was the chairman of the agricultural council of the Zschopau district. In 1967, he became the chairman of the cooperation council "Am Greifenstein", then again the chairman of LPG Drebach.

In 1958, Drechsel became a member of the district directorate of the SED and of the Kreistag of Zschopau. In 1982, he became the chairman of the board of managers of the Peasants Mutual Aid Association of the Karl-Marx-Stadt district.

Dreschel was a member of the People's Chamber from 1986 to 1990.

He died on 5 January 2009 at the age of 80 and was buried at the cemetery of Drebach, Saxony.

== Honors ==
- Medal of Merit of the German Democratic Republic
- Deserving corporate farmer of the German Democratic Republic (1979)
- Hero of Labour (1984)
