= Ernst Timm =

German politician (1926–2005)

- Timm in 1989

First Secretary of the Socialist Unity Party in Bezirk Rostock
- In office 28 April 1975 – 12 November 1989
- Second Secretary: Heinz Lange
- Preceded by: Harry Tisch
- Succeeded by: Ulrich Peck
Volkskammer
Member of the Volkskammer for Wismar-Stadt, Wismar-Land, Bad Doberan, Grevesmühlen
In office 29 October 1976 – 16 November 1989
Preceded by	multi-member district
Succeeded by	Dietmar Huhn

Personal details
- Born: Ernst Timm; 16 October 1926 Brandenburg an der Havel, Province of Brandenburg, Free State of Prussia, Weimar Republic (now Brandenburg, Germany)
- Died: 15 December 2005 (aged 79)
- Party: Socialist Unity Party (1950–1989)
- Education: CPSU Higher Party School "W. I. Lenin" (Dipl.-Ges.-Wiss.)
- Occupation: Politician; Party Functionary; Aircraft Builder
- Awards: Patriotic Order of Merit, 1st class; Order of Karl Marx
- Central institution membership: 1976–1989: Full member, Central Committee; Other offices held: 1967–1975: First Secretary, Socialist Unity Party in Rostock; 1961–1966: Second Secretary, Socialist Unity Party in Bezirk Rostock; 1953–1955: First Secretary, Free German Youth in Rostock

Ernst Timm (16 October 1926 – 15 December 2005) was a German politician and party functionary of the Socialist Unity Party (SED).

In the German Democratic Republic, he served as the longtime First Secretary of the SED in Bezirk Rostock and was a member of the Central Committee of the SED.

== Life and career ==
=== Early career ===
He was born in 1926 in Brandenburg an der Havel to a working-class family. After attending elementary school, he completed training as a metal aircraft builder from 1941 to 1944 at a branch of the Arado Flugzeugwerke in Brandenburg/Neuendorf. From 1944, he served voluntarily in the Kriegsmarine. From 1945 to 1949, he was a Soviet prisoner of war, during which time he attended several anti-fascist schools.

After the end of World War II, parts and machines of the Arado factories that were not destroyed by air raids were transported to the Soviet Union as reparations, and the company was liquidated. Therefore, Timm could not return to his profession after his release from captivity in 1949.

From 1950, he engaged in political youth work with the Free German Youth (FDJ), the ruling Socialist Unity Party of Germany (SED) and the Free German Trade Union Federation (FDGB). As a full-time FDJ official, he led a department in the Central Council of the FDJ in Berlin from 1952 to 1953 and was the First Secretary of the FDJ in Rostock City until 1955.

=== Bezirk Rostock career ===
From 1954 to 1957, he studied at the CPSU Higher Party School "W. I. Lenin" in Moscow and graduated with a diploma in social sciences (Dipl.-Ges.-Wiss.). After returning from Moscow, he worked from 1958 to 1960 as Secretary for Agitation and Propaganda of the Rostock City SED.

In 1960, he became a department head and later, in 1961, Secretary for Agitation and Propaganda of the Bezirk Rostock SED, succeeding Werner Krolikowski, who became Second Secretary. In 1961, he became Bezirk Rostock SED Second Secretary, also responsible for Organization and Cadre Affairs, himself.

In 1966, he returned to the Rostock City SED as First Secretary.

=== Bezirk Rostock SED First Secretary ===
In April 1975, he succeeded Harry Tisch as First Secretary of the Bezirk Rostock SED. Tisch was elected as Chairman of the FDGB.

He additionally became a member of the FDGB federal executive board the same year and was elected as a full member of the Central Committee of the SED in May 1976 (IX. Party Congress). Later that year, he became member of the Volkskammer, nominally representing a constituency in the western part of his Bezirk. During his parliamentary tenure, he was a member of the Foreign Affairs Committee from 1982.

During the supply crisis and the clearly visible problems in the GDR in the early 1980s, he was quoted by the West German magazine Der Spiegel:

There is no reason to doubt the good and correct policy of the party if we call for the frugal use of everything available to us, even if we have to make certain changes in the assortment, even for everyday goods, and cannot always fulfill every wish at all times in supply matters.

— Ernst Timm, "Immer nur Huhn", DER SPIEGEL (44/1982)

In June 1989, he gained attention when, as a member of the Volkskammer, he confirmed the SED leadership's approval of the Tiananmen Massacre by the Chinese People's Liberation Army on 3 and 4 June 1989, and referred to the protesting students as "anti-constitutional elements."

The members of the Volkskammer state that in the current situation, the political solution of internal problems persistently sought by the party and state leadership of the People's Republic of China has been prevented by the violent, bloody actions of anti-constitutional elements. Consequently, the people's power was forced to restore order and security using armed forces. Unfortunately, there were numerous injuries and deaths.

— Ernst Timm, parliamentary speech in the Volkskammer (8 June 1989)

At one of the many meetings in the autumn of 1989, he was asked what the dictatorship of the proletariat actually was. His answer, that he would have to look it up in Lenin, caused loud laughter and revealed the state of the SED nomenklatura in the autumn of 1989 in the GDR.

Timm was awarded the Patriotic Order of Merit in silver in 1974 and the honor clasp to this order in 1986, and the Order of Karl Marx in 1984.

=== Peaceful Revolution ===
During the Wende, on 12 November 1989, the Bezirk Rostock SED removed him from the position of First Secretary and installed reformer Ulrich Peck as his successor. He was removed by his party from the Volkskammer a week later, on 16 November 1989.

He was subsequently expelled from the FDGB in December 1989 and the SED on 16 January 1990.

After being charged with abuse of office and corruption in August 1990, he was sentenced on 16 February 1993, by the Rostock Regional Court to 15 months in prison for breach of trust, as he had taken 80,000 East German marks from a fund for people's representatives for the expansion of his house. The sentence was suspended after taking into account the pre-trial detention.

=== Reunified Germany ===
Timm died in 2005 at the age of 79.
