= Helga Labs =

East German politician (born 1940)

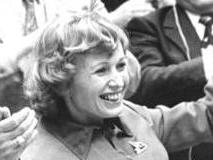

Minister of Public Education
- In office November 1989 – 1989

Personal details
- Born: 22 May 1940 (age 85) Wenigtreben, Germany (now Poland)
- Party: Socialist Unity Party of Germany

Helga Labs (born 22 May 1940) is an East German politician who served as the minister of public education of East Germany. As a member of the ruling party Socialist Unity Party (SED), she held several political and public posts in East Germany.

== Early life and education ==
Labs was born in Wenigtreben on 22 May 1940. Between 1955 and 1959 she studied at the institute for teacher training in Rochlitz and received a degree in teaching.

== Career ==
Labs joined the Rochlitz branch of the Free German Youth organization in 1956 and served as its secretary between 1959 and 1960. In 1959 he became a member of the SED. In 1974 she was named as the head of the Ernst Thälmann Pioneer Organisation, a youth organization, replacing Egon Krenz in the post. Lab's tenure lasted until 1985, and she was replaced by Wilfried Poßner in the post.

Labs was a member of the central committee of the SED from 1976 to 3 December 1989. She also served as chairman of the teaching and education union. In November 1989 she was appointed minister of public education, replacing Margot Honecker in the post.
