= Dieter-Gerhardt Worm =

German music conductor

Dieter-Gerhardt Worm (born 31 August 1930) is a German conductor. From 1974 until 1993, Worm was music director of the Robert Schumann Philharmonic Orchestra in Chemnitz for almost two decades.

== Life ==
Worm was born in Zittau in 1930. There, he attended the humanistic grammar school and studied piano, then conducting and musicology in Dresden, Weimar and Berlin. After his state examination in conducting and musicology, Worm assumed overall responsibility for repertoire planning, artist support and the budget for the GDR record label "Eterna" from 1954 to 1972. In 1972, after a trip to Japan, Worm was "received at the airport with a strict order not to enter his workplace again." As a result of this dismissal, Worm was unemployed for almost three years.

From 1974 to 1978, Worm was director of the Staatskapelle Berlin. From 1974 to 1993, he took over the corresponding position in Chemnitz (at that time "Karl-Marx-Stadt") and directed the Robert-Schumann-Philharmonie there. From 1978 to 1986, Worm was professor at the summer academy of the Mozarteum in Salzburg.

In 1983 Worm received the Art Prize of the German Democratic Republic. In 1989 he was appointed to the board of the International Schumanngesellschaft Zwickau. In 1991, on his initiative, the Chemnitzer Musikverein e.V. was re-established and he became its first chairman. From 1993 to 1995, Worm was involved in the establishment of the Middle Saxon Philharmonic. In 1995 Worm received the Robert Schumann Prize of the City of Zwickau. Worm has conducted the Plauen Philharmonic Orchestra since 1999 and the Plauen-Zwickau Philharmonic Orchestra from 2001 to 2003.
