= Johanna Töpfer =

East German politician

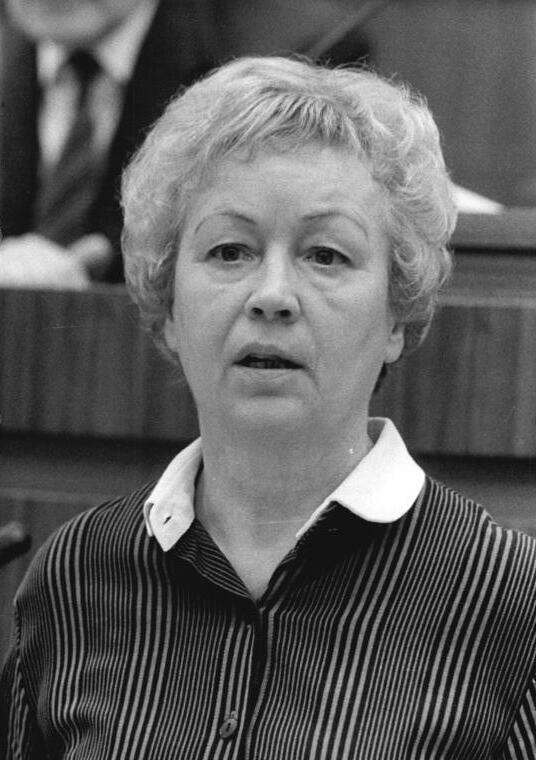
Johanna Töpfer at the Volkskammer 1986

Johanna Töpfer (née Schrocko; 3 April 1929 – 7 January 1990) was an East German politician and Deputy Director of the FDGB.

== Biography ==
Töpfer was born in Schneidemühl (Posen-West Prussia; today Piła, Poland) and started to work as a Waggon cleaner for the Deutsche Reichsbahn (East Germany) in 1945. She became a secretary in the cadre-department of the Reichsbahn administration in Leipzig and was educated at the teacher seminary at Dresden in 1951/52 with a correspondence course at the University of Berlin passing a graduation as Diplom-Wirtschaftlerin in 1955. Since 1952 Töpfer worked as a teacher and received her doctorate at the "Academy of Sociology at the Central Committee of the Socialist Unity Party of Germany (SED)".

Töpfer was a member of the Free German Trade Union Federation (FDGB) since 1945 and of the SED since 1949. In 1955 she became the deputy director of the FDGB-schools of Beesenstedt and Grünheide. Töpfer was a member of the executive board of the FDGB in 1956-59 and a member of the FDGB-presidium in 1968-89. She worked as a lecturer and later Professor at the FDGB-college "Fritz Heckert". In 1971 she also became a member of the Central Committee of the SED (until 1989) and in 1976 a member of the East German Parliament "Volkskammer".

Töpfer committed suicide on 7 January 1990.
