= Günter Hartmann =

German politician (born 1930)

Chairman of the National Democratic Party of Germany
- In office 1989–1990
- Preceded by: Heinrich Homann
- Succeeded by: Wolfgang Glaeser

Member of the Volkskammer
- In office 1973–1990

Personal details
- Born: 18 March 1930 (age 96) Halberstadt, Weimar Republic
- Party: Free Democratic Party (1990–); Association of Free Democrats (1990); National Democratic Party of Germany (1949–1990)
- Education: Freiberg University of Mining and Technology
- Awards: Patriotic Order of Merit, in gold (1985); Patriotic Order of Merit, in silver (1977 and 1972); Patriotic Order of Merit, in bronze (1964)

Günter Hartmann (born 18 March 1930) is a German politician who was chairman of the National Democratic Party of Germany, and a member of the Volkskammer.

== Life ==
Hartmann was born on 18 March 1930 in Halberstadt. Following the end of the Second World War, he became a member of the Free German Youth and the Free German Trade Union Federation. From 1947 to 1948 Hartmann studied at the Freiberg University of Mining and Technology, graduating as a surveyor.

In 1973, Hartmann became a member of the Volkskammer. He served on the Volkskammer's foreign affairs committee. Between 1972 and 1989, he was a member of the national council of the National Front. Between May 1987 and November 1989, Hartmann served as deputy chairman of the National Democratic Party of Germany. He then assumed leadership of the party in December 1989, following the forced resignation of chairman Heinrich Homann. Hartmann held the position of chairman of the NDPD only briefly. He returned to the role of deputy chairman in January 1990, with Wolfgang Glaeser taking over as chairman. During this period, Hartmann was a proponent of a confederation between the East and West Germany, rather than a total reunification. In March 1990, he retired from his position as deputy chairman. Hartmann then became a member of the Association of Free Democrats, and later the Free Democratic Party.

== Awards ==
- Patriotic Order of Merit, in bronze (1964); in silver (1972 and 1977); in gold (1985)
