= 1963 East German general election =

- 20 October 1963

434 out of 500 seats in the Volkskammer
- Turnout: 99.25% (▲0.35pp)
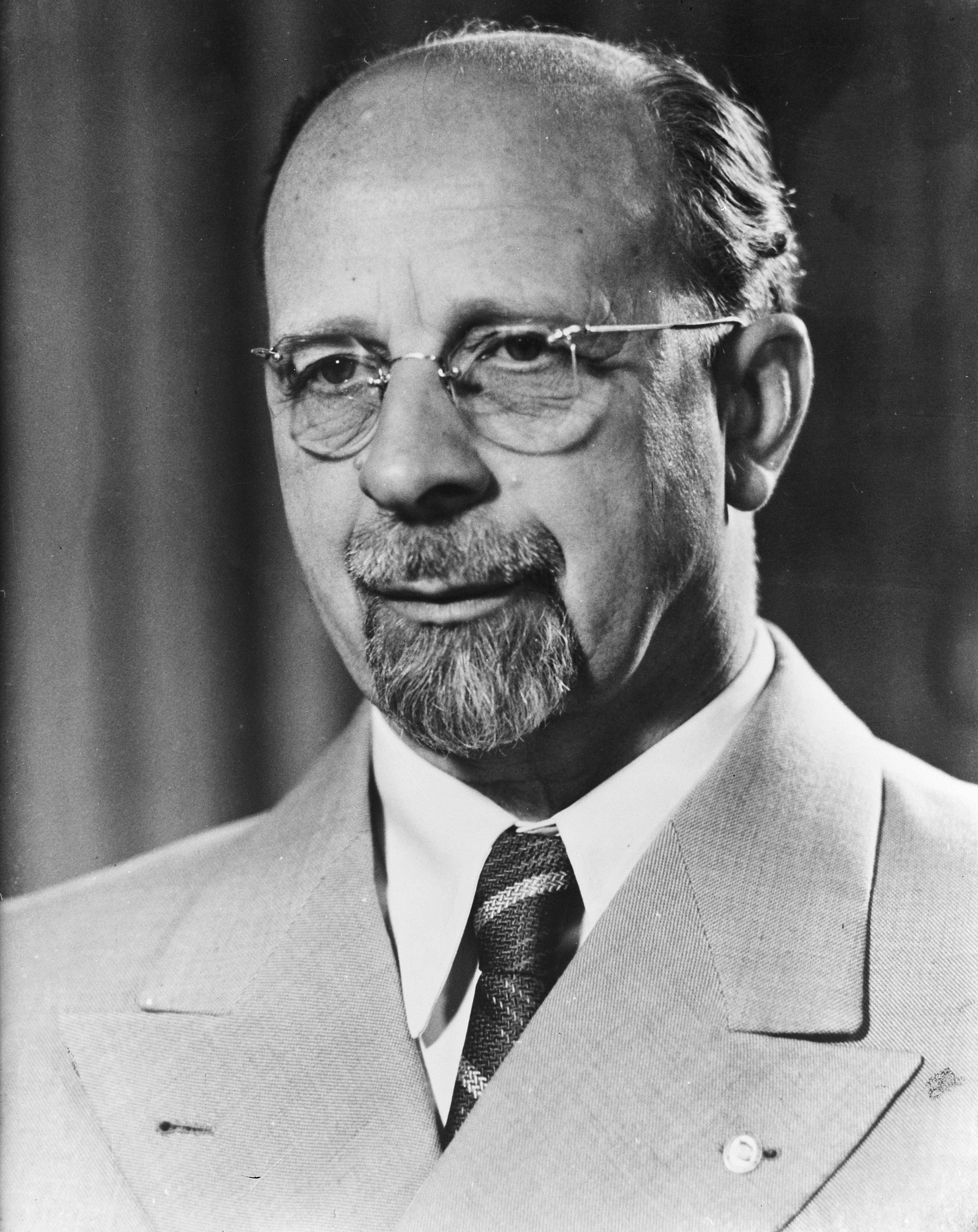
	Majority party
Leader	Walter Ulbricht
Party	SED
Alliance	National Front
Seats won	127
Seat change	▲10
- Results of the election.
Chairman of the Council of Ministers before election
Otto Grotewohl
SED
Chairman of the Council of Ministers after election
Otto Grotewohl
SED

General elections were held in East Germany on 20 October 1963. They were to originally be held in November 1962 but were postponed. 434 deputies to the Volkskammer were elected and 66 deputies appointed by the Magistrate of East Berlin, with all of them being candidates of the single-list National Front, dominated by the communist Socialist Unity Party of Germany. The seat count outside of East Berlin was expanded in this election by 34, making the Volkskammer a round 500 members large. The new seats (plus 12 seats allocated to the Peasants Mutual Aid Association in previous elections) exclusively went to the SED and the mass organizations, the bloc parties' all staying at 52 seats.

Like all East German elections before the Peaceful Revolution, this election was neither free nor fair. Voters were only presented with a closed list of candidates (pre-approved by the SED Central Committee Secretariat) put forward by the National Front. The list predetermined an outcome whereby the SED had both the largest faction in the Volkskammer and a majority of its members, as almost all of the Volkskammer members elected for one of the mass organizations were also members of the SED. While voters could reject the list, they would have to use the polling booth, the use of which was documented by Stasi informants located at every polling site, and had to cross out every name, as "Yes" and "No" boxes were removed after the 1950 election. Abstaining from voting was also seen as oppositional and punished. While legally permissible according to East German election laws, widespread election monitoring was not done out of fear for repression until the 1989 local elections.

== Results ==
Party or alliance		Votes	%	Seats	+/–
National Front	Socialist Unity Party of Germany		99.95	127	+10
National Front	Free German Trade Union Federation		99.95	68	+15
National Front	Christian Democratic Union		99.95	52	0
National Front	Liberal Democratic Party of Germany		99.95	52	0
National Front	National Democratic Party of Germany		99.95	52	0
National Front	Democratic Farmers' Party of Germany		99.95	52	0
National Front	Free German Youth		99.95	40	+11
National Front	Democratic Women's League of Germany		99.95	35	+6
National Front	Cultural Association of the GDR		99.95	22	+4
Against			0.05	–	–
Total				500	+34
Total votes		11,533,859	–		
Registered voters/turnout		11,621,158	99.25		
Source: Nohlen et al.

== Sources ==
- Dieter Nohlen, Dolf Sternberger, Bernhard Vogel and Klaus Landfried (Ed.). Die Wahl der Parlamente und anderer Staatsorgane. Herausgegeben von Dolf Sternberger und Bernhard Vogel. Redaktion von Dieter Nohlen Band I: Europa. Berlin: Verlag Walter de Gruyter & Co. 1969. p. 376.
- Cyril Edwin Black and Ernst Christian Helmreich. Twentieth Century Europe: A History. New York: Knopf. 1972. p. 677.
