= Eveline Klett =

German politician

Eveline Klett (born 9 October 1949) is a German former politician who was a member of the State Council of East Germany, the country's collective head of state, from 1986 until 1989.

== Life ==
Klett was born in Vielau, near Zwickau, in 1949. She completed an apprenticeship as a turner. Later, in 1970–71, she went to an SED party academy (Bezirksparteischule).

She had joined the Free German Youth in 1964, the Socialist Unity Party of Germany (SED) in 1969, and the Democratic Women's League of Germany in 1976. Also in 1976, Klett became a member of the Volkskammer, which she remained until the 1990 East German general election.

Klett was considered one of the token women in the East German leadership. She lived and worked in Zwickau, and would travel to Berlin at least once per month to attend political meetings. She retired from politics after the Peaceful Revolution and German reunification.
