= Apprenticeship in Germany =

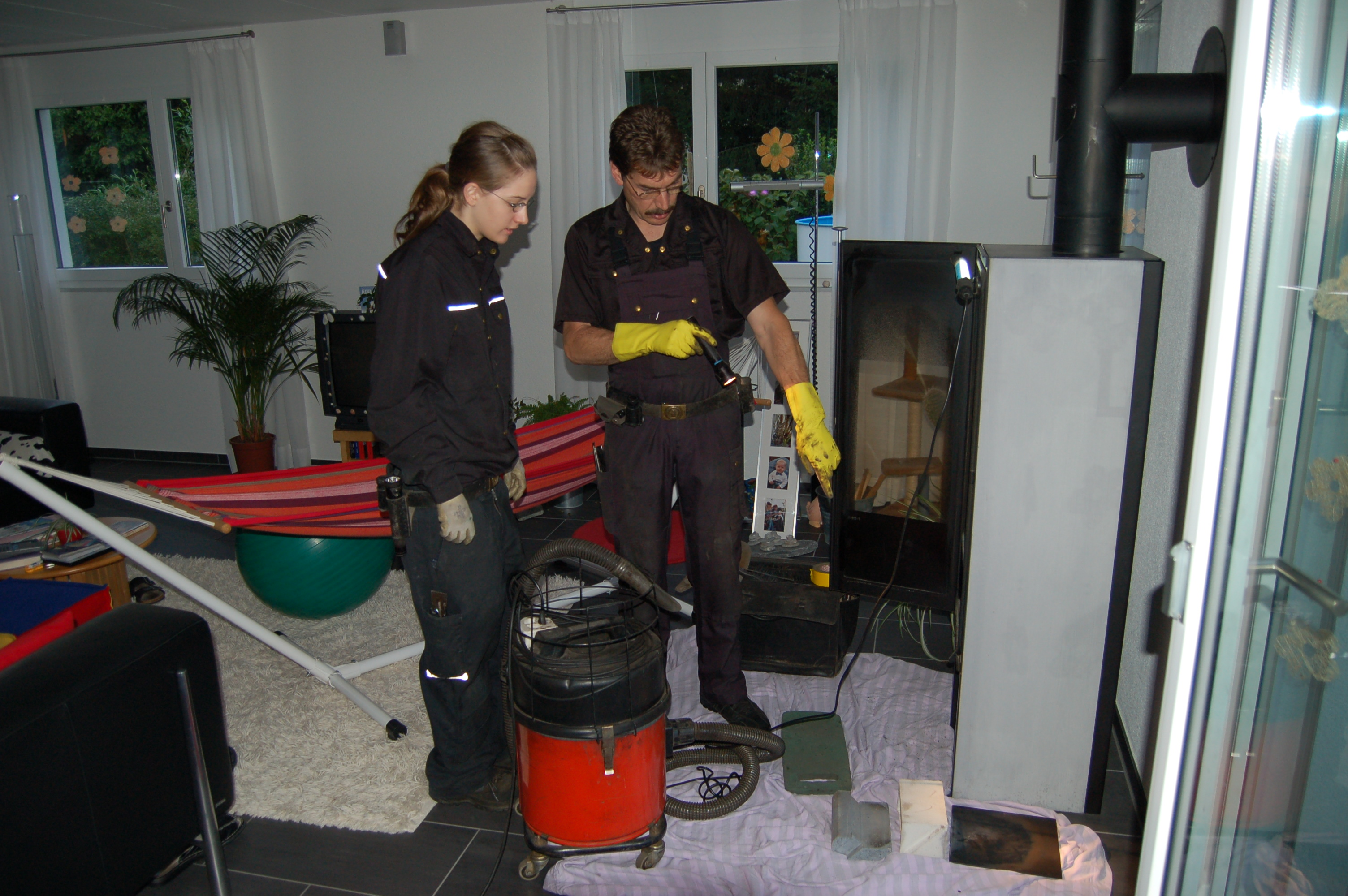
A master chimney sweep and apprentice in 2008

Apprenticeships are part of Germany's dual education system. In some officially recognized trades such as marine engineering, completing an apprenticeship is mandatory. In others, such as food technology, it may still be recommended or required by employers to do so.

== Background ==
An apprenticeship is a system for training a new generation of practitioners of a trade or profession with on-the-job training and often some accompanying study (classroom work and reading). Apprenticeships can also enable practitioners to gain a license to practice in a regulated profession. Most of their training is done while working for an employer who helps the apprentices learn their trade or profession. This work is paid, and a minimum wage for apprentices is defined by law since 2020. Wages increase yearly during the apprenticeship, reflecting the increasing skills and productivity of the apprentice. Apprentices are covered in the German health insurance system. If they are younger than 18 years, they are protected by additional labour regulations, for example limiting night shifts and daily work hours to lower numbers than for legal adults.

Some companies require by contract the apprentices' continued labour for an agreed period after they have achieved measurable competencies.

== History ==
Kathleen Thelen has traced the origins of the modern system of plant-based apprenticeship in Germany to the legislation passed by the German government in 1897. German vocational training institutions have gradually changed since then; however key features of the original system are still in place.

In 1969, a law (the Berufsbildungsgesetz) was passed which regulated and unified the vocational training system and codified the shared responsibility of the state, the unions, associations and the chambers of trade and industry. The dual system was successful in both parts of the divided Germany. In the GDR, three-quarters of the working population had completed apprenticeships.

== Infrastructure ==
In Germany, there are 342 recognized trades (Ausbildungsberufe) for which an apprenticeship can be completed. They include for example doctor's assistant, banker, dispensing optician, plumber or oven builder. The dual system means that apprentices spend about 50–70% of their time in companies and the rest in formal education. Depending on the profession, they may work for three to four days a week in the company and then spend one or two days at a vocational school (Berufsschule). This is usually the case for trade and craftspeople. For other professions, usually which require more theoretical learning, the working and school times take place blockwise e.g., in a 12–18 weeks interval. These Berufsschulen have been part of the education system since the 19th century.

== Popularity ==
In 2001, two-thirds of young people aged under 22 began an apprenticeship, and 78% of them completed it, meaning that approximately 51% of all young people under 22 have completed an apprenticeship. One in three companies offered apprenticeships in 2003, in 2004 the government signed a pledge with industrial unions that all companies except very small ones must take on apprentices.

In 2021, 32% of 15-19 year-old upper‑secondary students in Germany were enrolled in vocational programmes.

The latent decrease of the German population due to low birth rates is now causing a lack of young people available to start an apprenticeship. The number of companies offering an apprenticeship is also decreasing, shrinking from 25 to 20 percent between 2011 and 2016. Parts of employers also complain about people lacking maturity required to start an apprenticeship today, which however ignores the case that expectations towards apprenticeship starters were lower in previous generations.

=== Apprenticeship after general education ===
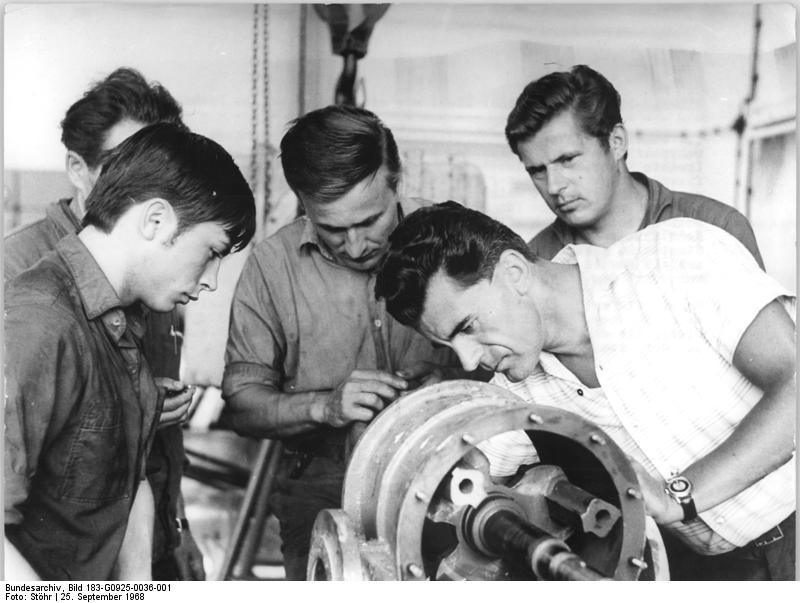
A master discusses a vacuum compressor with his apprentice (front left) and several other craftsmen.

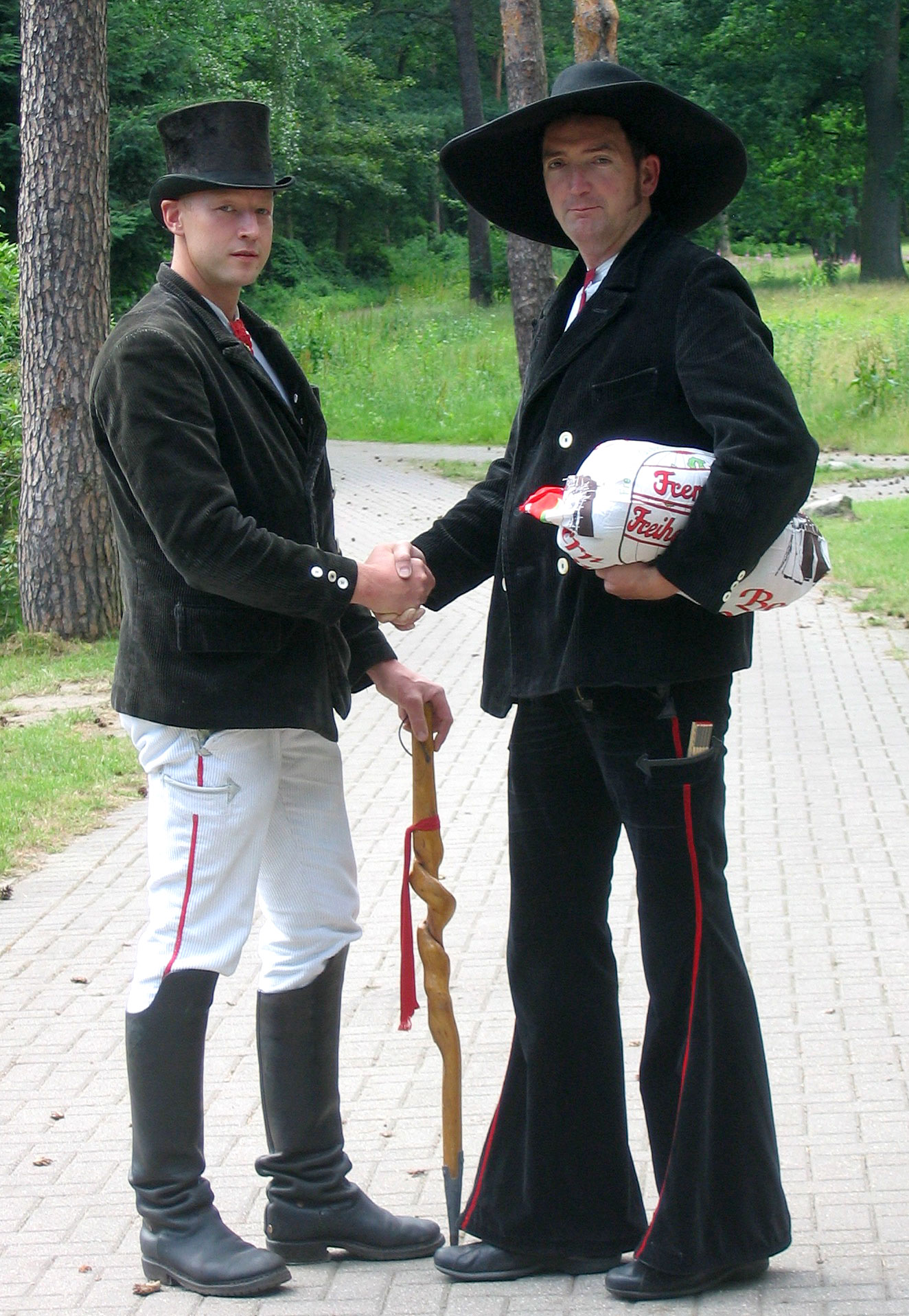
German wandering journeymen in traditional costume

After graduation from school at the age of fifteen to nineteen (depending on type of school), students start an apprenticeship in their chosen professions. Realschule and Gymnasium graduates usually have better chances for being accepted as an apprentice for sophisticated craft professions or apprenticeships in white-collar jobs in finance or administration. An apprenticeship takes between 2.5 and 3.5 years. Originally, at the beginning of the 20th century, less than 1% of German students attended the Gymnasium (the 8–9 year university-preparatory school) to obtain the Abitur graduation which was the only way to university back then. In the 1950s still only 5% of German youngsters entered university and in 1960 only 6% did. Due to the risen social wealth and the increased demand for academic professionals in Germany, about 24% of the youngsters entered college/university in 2000. Of those who did not enter university, many started an apprenticeship. The apprenticeships usually end a person's education by age 18–20, but also older apprentices are accepted by the employers under certain conditions. This is frequently the case for immigrants from countries without a compatible professional training system.

== Business and administrative professions ==
The precise skills and theory taught on German apprenticeships are strictly regulated. The employer is responsible for the entire education programme coordinated by the German chamber of commerce. Apprentices obtain a special apprenticeship contract until the end of the education programme. During the programme it is not allowed to assign the apprentice to regular employment and he is well protected from abrupt dismissal until the programme ends. The defined content and skill set of the apprentice profession must be fully provided and taught by the employer. The time taken is also regulated. Each profession takes a different time, usually between 24 and 36 months.

Thus, everyone who has completed an apprenticeship, e.g. as an industrial manager (Industriekaufmann), has learned the same skills and has attended the same courses in procurement and stocking up, controlling, staffing, accounting procedures, production planning, terms of trade and transport logistics and various other subjects. Someone who has not taken this apprenticeship or did not pass the final examinations at the chamber of industry and commerce is not allowed to call himself an Industriekaufmann. Most job titles are legally standardized and restricted. An employment in such function in any company would require this completed degree.

== Trade and craft professions ==
The rules and laws for the trade and craftwork apprentices such as mechanics, bakers, joiners, etc. are as strict as and even broader than for the business professions. The involved procedures, titles and traditions still strongly reflect the medieval origin of the system. Here, the average duration is about 36 months, some specialized crafts even take up to 42 months.

After completion of the training course, a baker, for example, is allowed to call himself a journeyman baker (Bäckergeselle). The journeyman can enter the master's school (Meisterschule) and continue his education at evening courses for 3–4 years or full-time for about one year. Graduation from the master's school confers the title of a master craftsman (Meister) of his profession – the journeyman baker becomes a master baker (Bäckermeister). A master is officially entered in the local trade register, the Handwerksrolle. A master craftsman is allowed to employ and to train new apprentices. In some mostly safety-related professions, e.g., that of electrician, only a master is allowed to found his own company.

== License for educating apprentices ==
To employ and to educate apprentices requires a specific license. The AdA – Ausbildung der Ausbilder – "Education of the Educators" license needs to be acquired by a training at the chamber of industry and commerce.

The masters complete this license course within their own master's coursework. The training and examination of new masters is only possible for masters who have been working several years in their profession and who have been accepted by the chambers as a trainer and examiner.

Academic professionals, e.g., engineers, seeking this license need to complete the AdA during or after their university studies, usually by a one-year evening course.

The holder of the license is only allowed to train apprentices within his own field of expertise. For example, a mechanical engineer would be able to educate industrial mechanics, but not e.g., laboratory assistants or civil builders.

== After the apprenticeship of trade and craft professions ==
When the apprenticeship is ended, the former apprentice now is considered a journeyman. He may choose to travel as a wandering journeyman.

According to a 2026 study, 40% of apprentices end up working in professions different from what they trained in.

== See also ==
- Dual education system
- Internationaler Bund
