= Machine tractor station =

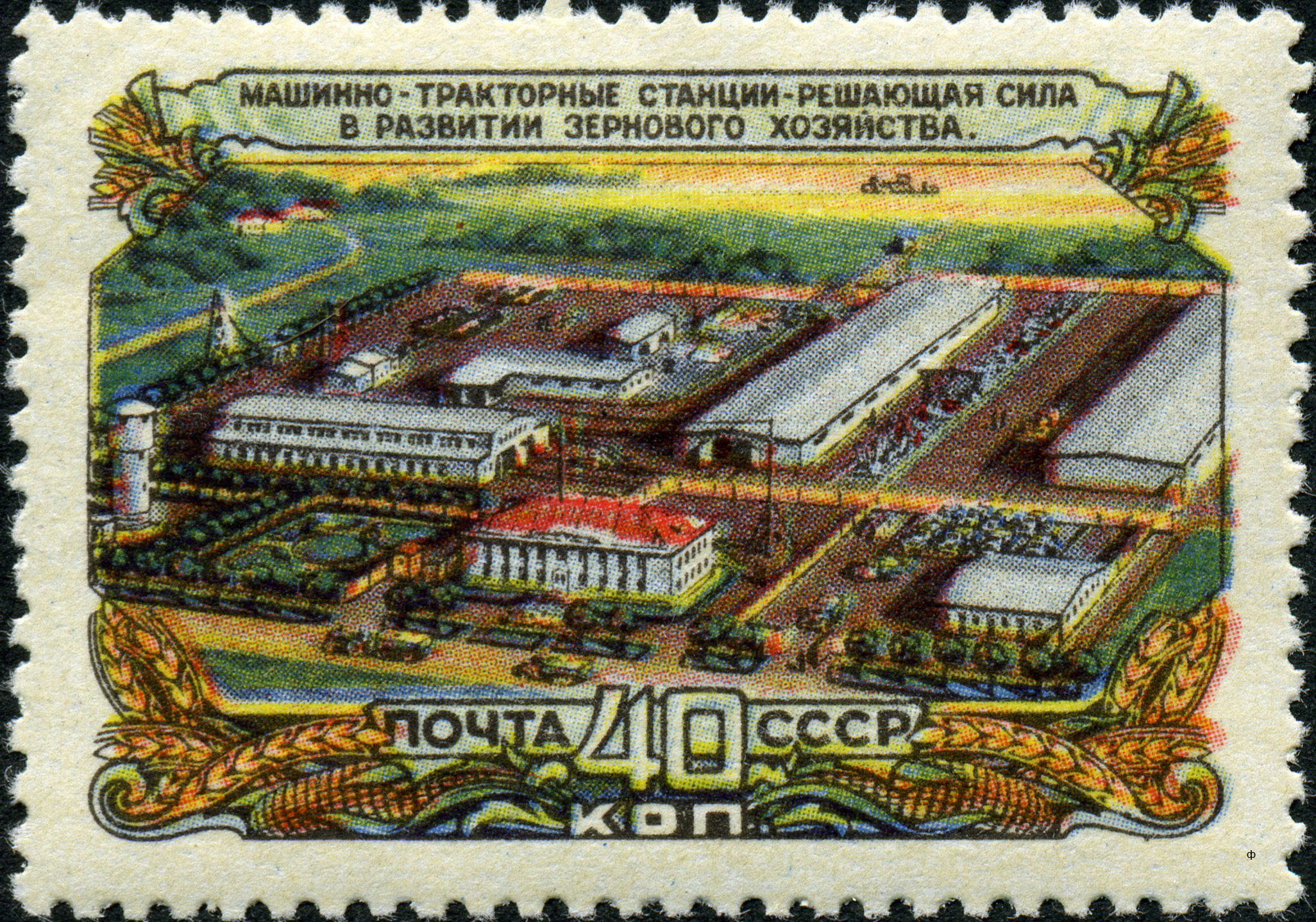
A 1956 Soviet stamp depicting an MTS

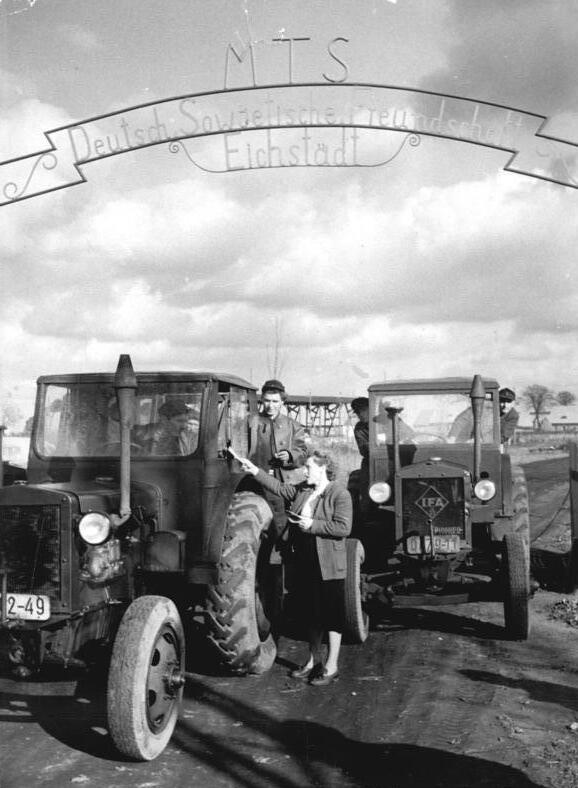
MTS in East Germany

The machine tractor station (MTS) (Ukrainian: машинно-тракторна станція, romanized: mashynno-traktorna stantsiia, Russian: машинно-тракторная станция, romanized: mashinno-traktornaya stantsiya, МТС) was a state enterprise for ownership and maintenance of agricultural machinery that were used in kolkhozy (collective farms operated by the government). Each MTS was responsible for around 40 kolkhozy. The first ever MTS was organized in the Odesa Oblast (Shevchenkivska MTS). MTSs were introduced in 1928 as a shared resource of scarce agricultural machinery and technical personnel.

William Taubman, Khrushchev's biographer, describes them as follows:

As the name implies, the MTSs were rural agencies that supplied collective farms with agricultural machinery and people to run it. They were set up in the late 1920s and early 1930s, when the kolkhozy were too weak and disorganized to manage their own equipment. Ideologically, collective farms were a "lesser" form of property (since theoretically they belonged to the collective rather than the state as a whole); hence it would not do to have them own part of the "means of production." Politically, the new collective farms, into which so many peasants were dragooned, were unreliable. So the MTS also served as a party (and police) stronghold in the countryside.

The main units of an MTS were tractor brigades and automobile brigades, which performed the corresponding agricultural work. It was paid with the share of the agricultural product called natural payment (Russian: натуральная оплата, натуроплата, naturoplata). Over time, MTSs became an instrument of transferring the agricultural production from kolkhozy to the sovkhozy of the state. 75,000 tractors had been supplied by MTSs to Soviet collective farms by 1932, and in 1933 the natural payment constituted about 20% of the product and continued to grow.

They existed as independent inter-kolkhoz service until 1958, when the machinery was transferred to the farms, and MTS transformed into machinery service stations (Russian: ремонтно-техническая станция, РТС), which were still known under the old name for longer time. In 1972 they were further renamed into Regional Association "Selkhoztekhnika" (Russian: Сельхозтехника, an abbreviation for сельскохозяйственная техника, agricultural machinery).

In post-Soviet Russia some economists expressed ideas about the revival of MTSs to help small independent farmers
