= 1986 East German general election =

- 8 June 1986

All 500 seats in the Volkskammer
- Turnout: 99.74% (▲0.53pp)
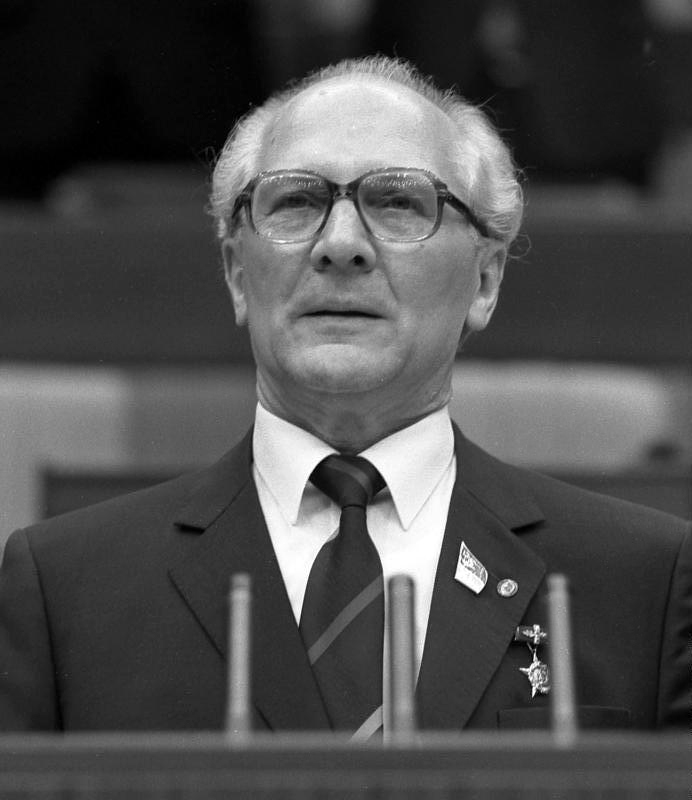
	Majority party
Leader	Erich Honecker
Party	SED
Alliance	National Front
Seats won	500
Seat change	Steady
- Results of the election.
Chairman of the Council of Ministers before election
Willi Stoph
SED
Elected Chairman of the Council of Ministers
Willi Stoph
SED

General elections were held in East Germany on 8 June 1986.

500 deputies were elected to the Volkskammer, with all of them being candidates of the single-list National Front. 703 Front candidates were put forward, with 500 being elected and 203 becoming substitute deputies. There was a minor change to the predetermined seat allocation: The Peasants Mutual Aid Association was allocated a faction with 14 Volkskammer members (led by deputy association chairman Manfred Scheler) at the expense of the other mass organizations. The Peasants Mutual Aid Association had last been given seats in 1963.

At its first session on 16 June, the Volkskammer re-elected Willi Stoph as Chairman of the Council of Ministers, while Erich Honecker, General Secretary of the ruling Socialist Unity Party, was also re-elected Chairman of the State Council.

Like all East German elections before the Peaceful Revolution, this election was neither free nor fair. Voters were only presented with a closed list of candidates (pre-approved by the SED Central Committee Secretariat) put forward by the National Front. The list predetermined an outcome whereby the SED had both the largest faction in the Volkskammer and a majority of its members, as almost all of the Volkskammer members elected for one of the mass organizations were also members of the SED (in this election, all but 4 out of the 165 mass organization Volkskammer members were SED members). While voters could reject the list, they would have to use the polling booth, the use of which was documented by Stasi informants located at every polling site, and had to cross out every name, as "Yes" and "No" boxes were removed after the 1950 election. Abstaining from voting was also seen as oppositional and punished. While legally permissible according to East German election laws, widespread election monitoring was not done out of fear for repression until the 1989 local elections.

In the 1986 election, limited election monitoring was done by a group around Rainer Eppelmann in eight polling stations in Berlin-Friedrichshain. In these eight polling stations alone, 547 voters did not participate in the election. However, the official election results for all of East Berlin (which had hundreds of polling stations) showed only 840 citizens who had not voted. This strongly suggests the election was also fraudulent.

This would be the last election held in East Germany before the Peaceful Revolution in 1989, three years into the Volkskammer's term.

== Results ==
Party or alliance		Votes	%	Seats	+/–
National Front	Socialist Unity Party of Germany	12,392,094	99.94	127	0
National Front	Free German Trade Union Federation	12,392,094	99.94	61	–7
National Front	Christian Democratic Union	12,392,094	99.94	52	0
National Front	Liberal Democratic Party of Germany	12,392,094	99.94	52	0
National Front	National Democratic Party of Germany	12,392,094	99.94	52	0
National Front	Democratic Farmers' Party of Germany	12,392,094	99.94	52	0
National Front	Free German Youth	12,392,094	99.94	37	–3
National Front	Democratic Women's League of Germany	12,392,094	99.94	32	–3
National Front	Cultural Association of the GDR	12,392,094	99.94	21	–1
National Front	Peasants Mutual Aid Association	12,392,094	99.94	14	+14
Against		7,512	0.06	–	–
Total		12,399,606	100.00	500	0
Valid votes		12,399,606	99.98		
Invalid/blank votes		2,407	0.02		
Total votes		12,402,013	100.00		
Registered voters/turnout		12,434,444	99.74		
Source: IPU, Wahlrecht

== See also ==
- List of Volkskammer members (9th election period)
