= Wolfgang Junker =

East German Construction Minister (1929–1990)

- Junker in 1978

Minister for Construction
- In office 7 February 1963 – 18 November 1989
- Chairman of the Council of Ministers: Otto Grotewohl; Willi Stoph; Horst Sindermann; Willi Stoph
- First Deputy: Karlheinz Martini; Karl Schmiechen
- Preceded by: Ernst Scholz
- Succeeded by: Gerhard Baumgärtel (Construction and Housing)
Volkskammer
Member of the Volkskammer
In office 25 June 1981 – 11 January 1990
Preceded by	Rudolf Singer
Succeeded by	Constituency abolished
Constituency	Eisleben, Hettstedt, Sangerhausen, №1
In office 29 October 1976 – 25 June 1981
Appointed by	Magistrate of East Berlin

Personal details
- Born: 23 February 1929 Quedlinburg, Province of Saxony, Free State of Prussia, Weimar Republic (now Saxony-Anhalt, Germany)
- Died: 9 April 1990 (aged 61) East Berlin, East Germany
- Cause of death: Suicide by hanging
- Party: Socialist Unity Party (1949–1989)
- Education: Ingenieurschule für Bauwesen
- Occupation: Politician; construction manager; bricklayer
- Awards: Patriotic Order of Merit, 1st class; Order of Karl Marx; Grand Star of Peoples' Friendship
- Central institution membership: 1971–1989: Full member, Central Committee; 1967–1971: Candidate member, Central Committee; Other offices held: 1961–1963: First Deputy Minister, Ministry for Construction; 1958–1961: Director, VEB Industriebau Brandenburg; 1955–1957: Director, VEB Bagger- und Förderarbeiten Berlin

Wolfgang Junker (23 February 1929 – 9 April 1990) was an East German construction manager, civil servant and politician of the Socialist Unity Party (SED).

Starting in 1963, Junker served as East Germany's Construction Minister for over two decades, overseeing the country's housing programme and the construction of the Palace of the Republic but also the deterioration of the historic inner cities in the 1970s and 1980s. He was a full member of the Central Committee of the SED. He was forced out of office during the Peaceful Revolution and committed suicide in April 1990 after being indicted on abuse of office charges.

== Life and career ==
=== Early career ===
Wolfgang Junker was born in Quedlinburg (then part of the Prussian Province of Saxony) on 23 February 1929. He was a member of the Deutsches Jungvolk and later the Hitler Youth from 1939 to 1945. After attending elementary and middle school, he completed an apprenticeship as a bricklayer in 1945 and worked in that profession until 1949 in Quedlinburg.

In 1949, he joined the ruling Socialist Unity Party (SED) and studied at the Engineering School for Construction in Osterwieck until 1952. From 1952 to 1953, he thereafter was a construction manager during the construction of Stalinallee in Berlin, and until 1954, at the Bau-Union Nord in Glowe. He then served as the director of several state-owned enterprises: from 1955 to 1957 of the VEB Excavation and Conveying Works Berlin and from 1958 to 1961 of the VEB Industrial Construction Brandenburg.

=== Construction Minister ===
In January 1961, Junker joined the Ministry for Construction as state secretary and first deputy minister. On 7 February 1963, Junker succeeded Ernst Scholz, who had been ill for quite some time, as Minister for Construction. Scholz was appointed as ambassador to the United Arab Republic later that year. From 1972 to 1989, he was chairman of the East German delegation to and from 1973 also chairman of the Comecon commission for cooperation in construction.

Additionally, he was made a candidate member of the Central Committee of the SED at the VII. Party Congress in April 1967, rising to become a full member at the VIII. Party Congress in June 1971, serving until its collective resignation in December 1989. He was additionally elected to the Volkskammer in 1981, nominally representing a constituency in northwestern Bezirk Halle. He had previously been an Magistrate‑appointed member for East Berlin since 1976.

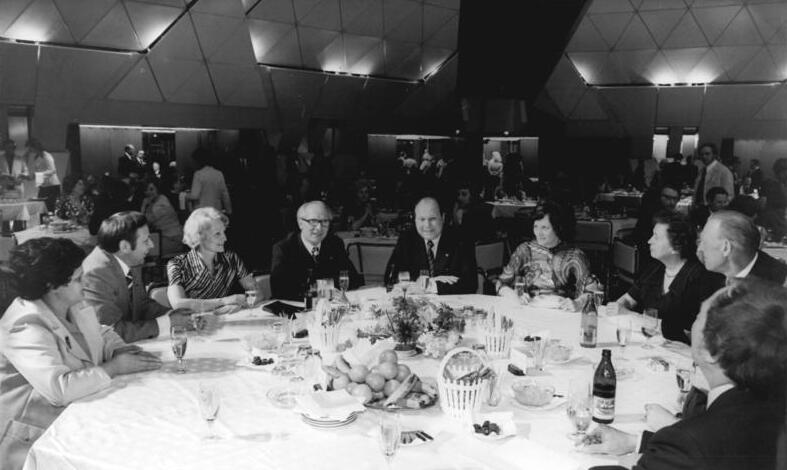
Junker (center) alongside Erich Honecker (left of center) at the opening of the Palace of the Republic in April 1976

When Junker came to power, East Germany still suffered from a post-war housing shortage. In 1971, new SED leader Erich Honecker proposed a massive housing programme, aiming to eliminate East Germany housing shortage by 1990. While the official statistics for many housing units built were greatly inflated, the programme was still considered a success and became the signature policy of Honecker, with 1.9 million housing units being built by 1988. At the same time, Junker's Ministry struggled to maintain the rate of construction in particular during the 1980s due to severe shortages of labor, machines and construction materials. Furthermore, the historic inner cities of East Germany were neglected in favor of Plattenbauten in new planned cities such as Berlin-Marzahn and thus greatly deteriorated. Another signature project of Junker's tenure was the Palace of the Republic, constructed from 1973 to 1976.

In October 1979, Junker became the first East German government member to visit the West Germany and held discussions with his counterpart, Federal Minister for Regional Planning, Building and Urban Development Dieter Haack and State Minister Hans-Jürgen Wischnewski.

=== Downfall and death ===
During the Peaceful Revolution, Junker was one of three people (the others being First Secretary of the Bezirk Karl-Marx-Stadt SED Siegfried Lorenz and KoKo head Alexander Schalck-Golodkowski) initially considered by new SED leader Egon Krenz to replace retiring Chairman of the Council of Ministers Willi Stoph. Krenz and Junker had a good relationship through their shared dislike for Erich Honecker's and Günter Mittag's meddling in the government. Hans Modrow was chosen only after all three declined. On 7 November 1989, Junker ultimately resigned alongside the entire Stoph government. He was the longest-serving East German minister at that time.

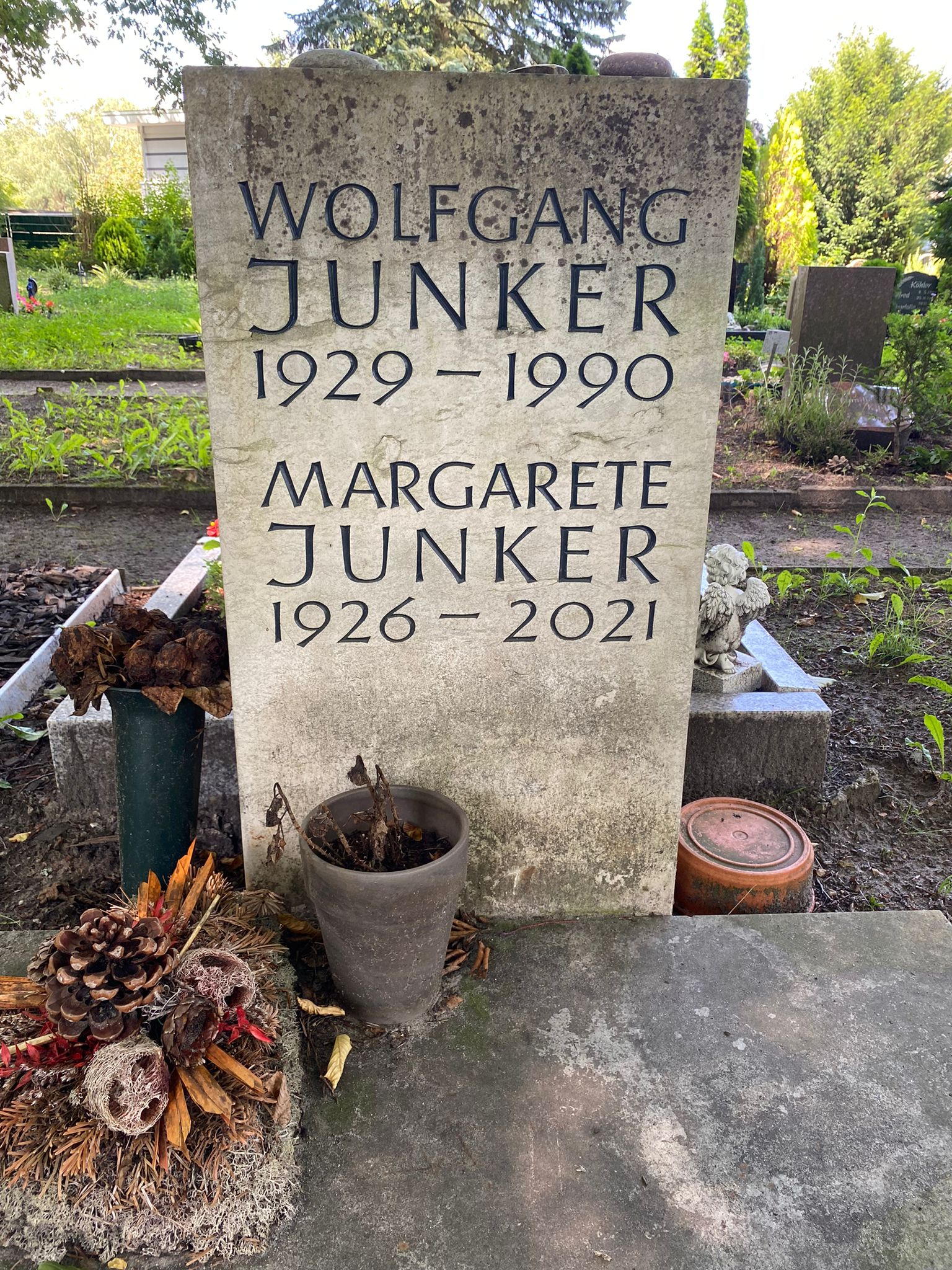
Junker's grave in 2024

Afterward, fearing prosecution, Junker initially planned to flee to the Soviet Union with Schalck-Golodkowski, but this was foiled when Schalck-Golodkowski instead defected to West Germany and became an BND informant. The Volkskammer revoked his parliamentary immunity in January 1990, after which he was arrested and put in pre-trial detention in Berlin-Hohenschönhausen on suspicion of embezzlement of state funds and breach of the constitution.

He was accused of illicitly collecting 20,000 East German marks annually as an honorary member of the East German Construction Academy. He had also appointed SED leader Erich Honecker and his economics czar Günter Mittag as honorary members. The change of statutes allowing this was deemed unconstitutional, as only the East German finance minister could have legally made the appointments. Additionally, it was alleged that he used funds from a reserve fund of his ministry to build private houses for SED officials.

On 28 February, Junker was released due to his poor health condition, his health having deteriorated significantly in prison. On 9 April 1990, he committed suicide by hanging in his Berlin apartment.
