= Heinz Vietze =

German politician (born 1947)

Chairman of the Rosa Luxemburg Foundation
- In office 18 November 2006 – 1 December 2012
- Deputy: Claudia Gohde; Michael Brie
- Preceded by: Reinhard Mocek
- Succeeded by: Dagmar Enkelmann

First Secretary of the Socialist Unity Party in Bezirk Potsdam
- In office 15 November 1989 – February 1990
- Second Secretary: Ulrich Schlaak
- Preceded by: Günther Jahn
- Succeeded by: Position abolished
Parliamentary constituencies
Member of the Landtag of Brandenburg
In office 26 October 1990 – 21 October 2009
Preceded by	Constituency established
Succeeded by	multi-member district

Personal details
- Born: Heinz Vietze; 19 September 1947 (age 79) Zeitz, State of Saxony-Anhalt, Soviet occupation zone, Allied-occupied Germany (now Saxony-Anhalt, Germany)
- Party: The Left (2007–)
- Other political affiliations: Party of Democratic Socialism (1989–2007); Socialist Unity Party (1966–1989)
- Education: Jugendhochschule „Wilhelm Pieck“; "Karl Marx" Party Academy (Dipl.-Ges.-Wiss.)
- Occupation: Politician; Party Functionary; Machinist
- Central institution membership: 1989–1991: Member, PDS Party Executive; 1977–1983; 1988–1989: Member, Bezirk Potsdam SED Secretariat; Other offices held: 1988–1989: First Secretary, Socialist Unity Party in Potsdam; 1984–1988: First Secretary, Socialist Unity Party in Oranienburg district; 1977–1983: First Secretary, Free German Youth in Bezirk Potsdam; 1970–1974: First Secretary, Free German Youth in Potsdam

Heinz Vietze (born 19 September 1947) is a former German politician and party functionary of the Socialist Unity Party (SED) and its successors, the Party of Democratic Socialism (PDS) and The Left. A local functionary of the SED in the 1980s, Vietze rose to become the last First Secretary of the Bezirk Potsdam SED during the Peaceful Revolution. He remained an influential politician of the PDS even after German reunification, being elected to the Landtag of Brandenburg, where he was the longtime whip of his party, and serving as key player of the Brandenburg PDS. At the same time, Vietze stirred controversy especially due to his collaboration with the Stasi.

Vietze retired from active politics in 2007, being elected chairman of the PDS's Rosa Luxemburg Foundation, a position he left in 2012.

== Life and career ==
=== Early life ===
Heinz Vietze was born in 1947 in Zeitz, which at the time was part of the Soviet occupation zone, to a working-class family. He joined the Free German Youth (FDJ), the only legal youth movement in East Germany, in 1961.

After completing polytechnic secondary school, he trained from 1964 to 1967 as a lathe operator, as vocational training with Abitur (university entrance qualification). He became a member of the ruling Socialist Unity Party (SED) in 1966, despite his father having left the party in 1952 during its Stalinization.

Following this, he attended a one-year course for youth functionaries at the FDJ Youth Academy "Wilhelm Pieck" at the Bogensee. From 1968 to 1970, he thereafter worked as an employee of the Potsdam FDJ and then served as the Second and later First Secretary of the Potsdam FDJ until 1974.

=== Stasi collaboration ===
During his time as a local FDJ functionary, Vietze was registered from May 1972 to May 1975 as a Societal Security Collaborator (German: Gesellschaftlicher Mitarbeiter für Sicherheit) (GMS), a type of informal collaborator, for the Stasi. As Stasi informant, Vietze passed on critical remarks about the GDR made by young people, including their names and addresses. His registration ended when he became a full-time employee of the FDJ and later SED. Due to the strict subordination of the Stasi under the SED, unofficial collaboration with SED cadres was forbidden.

In 2011, a report prepared for the Enquete Commission of the Landtag of Brandenburg tasked with reappraising the SED dictatorship concluded that Vietze should have been asked to return his parliamentary mandate during the 1990–1994 legislative period due to his collaboration with the Stasi. The report on the post-reunification Stasi review practices described it as "inexplicable" that Vietze was not even mentioned in the final report of the review commission, which consisted of two church dignitaries, in November 1991.

=== FDJ and SED nomenclature ===
Vietze studied at the "Karl Marx" Party Academy until 1977, graduating with a diploma in social sciences (Dipl.-Ges.-Wiss.). He was thereafter promoted to First Secretary of the Bezirk Potsdam FDJ, a position he would hold until 1983.

In 1982, he summoned the future Brandenburg Finance Minister Rainer Speer, who was working in an FDJ cultural center at the time, and forced him to cancel a planned event because church groups, who became a center of the opposition movement, were also supposed to participate, threatening to transfer him to production.

In 1984, Vietze was moved up to the SED apparatus as First Secretary of the SED in Kreis Oranienburg, making him the absolute ruler of a mostly rural district of about 130,000 people north of Berlin. He was the youngest First Secretary of a district SED ever at the time.

He was promoted to First Secretary of the SED in Potsdam in 1988. In May 1989, Vietze removed Wilfried Seidel, the dry and unpopular Lord Mayor of Potsdam, as well as one-third of all members of the city government.

=== Peaceful Revolution ===
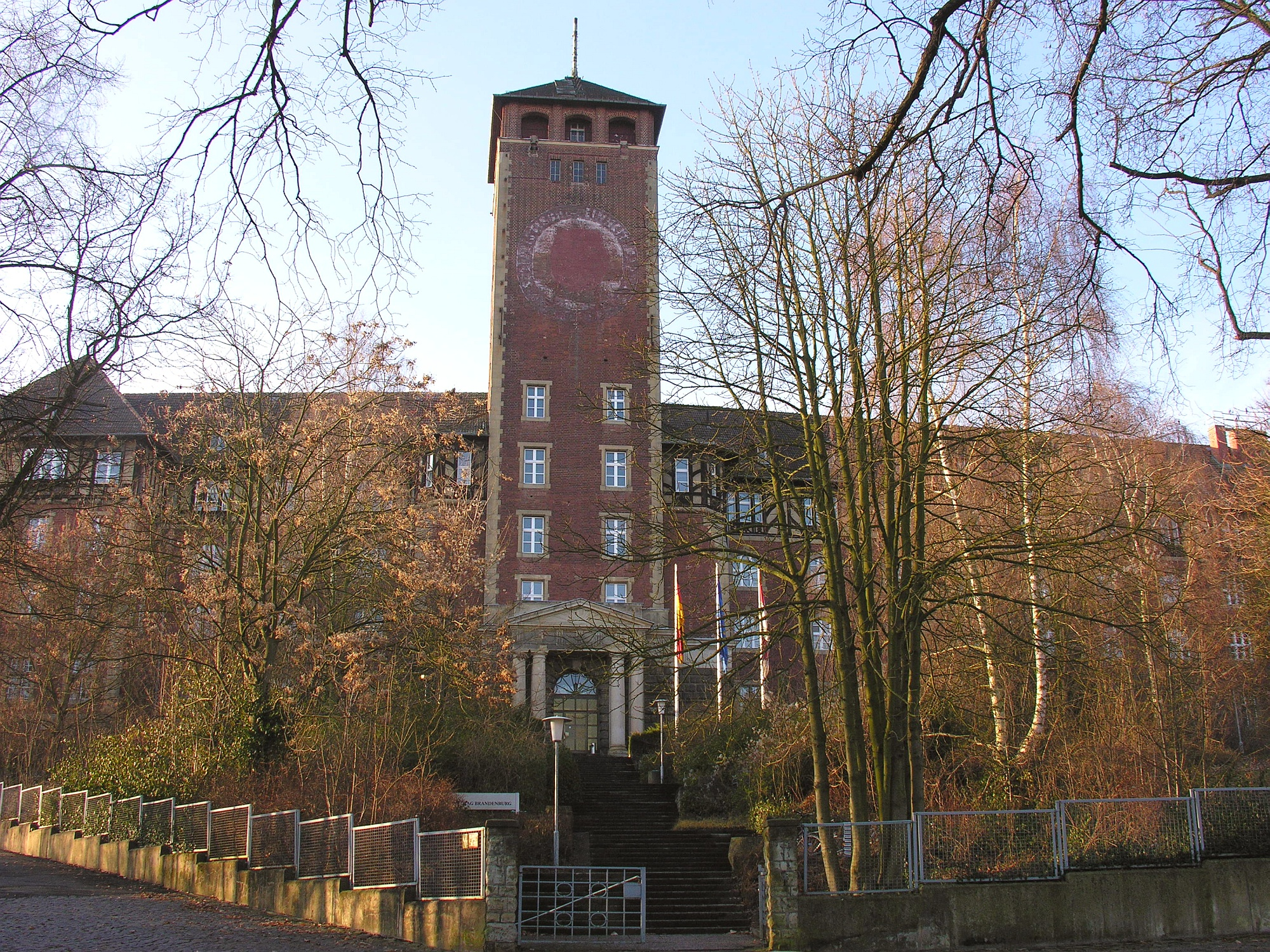
Former Bezirk Potsdam SED building in 2008. The SED's logo still is faintly visible. The building later housed the Landtag of Brandenburg.

During the Peaceful Revolution, on 14 September 1989, Vietze told his colleagues at a meeting of the Potsdam SED leadership: "If the enemy rises in his trench to directly fight against us, aims sharply, and uses all he has, then in the German Democratic Republic, the discussion about the last leaflet or trench newspaper must stop, and we must talk about who is aiming at this enemy, and with combat power, with class-based positions." This was widely interpreted as him suggesting a violent suppression of the growing opposition movement. Vietze has since been unable to recall if he said it.

He was additionally instrumental in the establishment of camps for dissidents.

Despite these previous hardliner stances, he was elected as First Secretary of the Bezirk Potsdam SED on 15 November 1989 as a reformer, longtime incumbent Günther Jahn having resigned due to public pressure. After his election, Vietze waited for four hours in the Haus am Werderschen Markt, the Central Committee of the SED building, to tell newly elected SED General Secretary Egon Krenz to resign, arguing that he has lost support of the party membership due to his complicity in the electoral fraud of the May 7 local elections.

=== Reunified Germany ===
Even after German reunification, Vietze remained an influential politician of the PDS. He was the first chairman of the Brandenburg PDS and a member of the PDS party executive in the early 90s. From 2004, he again was part of party leadership as member of the Die Linke.PDS's party executive.

From the inaugural 1990 state election, Vietze was a member of his party in the Landtag of Brandenburg and, from October 1990 to September 2007, also served as deputy parliamentary group leader and parliamentary manager (whip). From October 1999, he was deputy chairman of the main committee of the state parliament, and from October 2004, a member of the state parliament's presidium. From December 2003 to August 2004, he was also chairman of an investigative committee.

He became a key player of the Brandenburg PDS, being credited with managing the PDS's successful election campaigns. At the same time, his Stasi collaboration caused controversy, especially with Brandenburg SPD leader Matthias Platzeck, who had been haunted by the Stasi during his time as an environmental activist in Potsdam. While Platzeck would eventually form a coalition government with The Left, it was only after Vietze's retirement. Vietze's leadership in the PDS parliamentary group was additionally described as authoritarian, expelled former parliamentary group member Esther Schröder calling it "SED live".

After his 60th birthday in September 2007, he resigned from his party offices and took over the chairmanship of the Rosa Luxemburg Foundation, which is affiliated with the party. In December 2012, Dagmar Enkelmann was elected chairwoman of the foundation, Vietze retiring.

=== Personal life ===
Vietze is married and has three children. He lives in Potsdam-Golm, where he served as borough councillor until July 2024.
