= Günther Jahn =

East German politician (1930–2015)

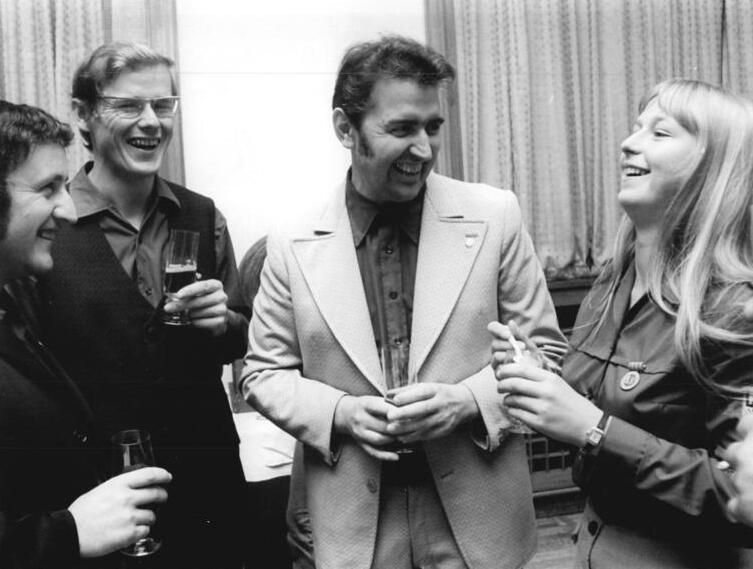
- Jahn in 1973

First Secretary of the Socialist Unity Party in Bezirk Potsdam
- In office 23 January 1976 – 15 November 1989
- Second Secretary: Ulrich Schlaak
- Preceded by: Werner Wittig
- Succeeded by: Heinz Vietze

First Secretary of the Free German Youth
- In office 13 May 1967 – 9 January 1974
- Second Secretary: Dieter Itzerott; Wolfgang Herger
- Preceded by: Horst Schumann
- Succeeded by: Egon Krenz
Volkskammer
Member of the Volkskammer
In office 25 June 1981 – 5 April 1990
| Preceded by | Friedrich Ebert Jr. |
| Succeeded by | Constituency abolished |
| Constituency | Potsdam-Stadt, Potsdam-Land, №1 |
In office 29 October 1976 – 25 June 1981
| Preceded by | Friedrich Kind |
| Succeeded by | Brunhilde Hanke |
| Constituency | Potsdam-Stadt, Potsdam-Land, №2 |
In office 14 July 1967 – 29 October 1976
| Preceded by | multi-member district |
| Succeeded by | Willi Grandetzka |
| Constituency | Arnstadt, Weimar-Land, Apolda, №1 |

Personal details
- Born: 9 January 1930 Erfurt, Province of Saxony, Free State of Prussia, Weimar Republic (now Thuringia, Germany)
- Died: 29 October 2015 (aged 85) Beelitz-Fichtenwalde, Brandenburg, Germany
- Party: Socialist Unity Party (1946–1989)
- Other political affiliations: Communist Party of Germany (1946); Party of Democratic Socialism (1989–1991)
- Education: University of Jena; Hochschule für Ökonomie Berlin (Dipl.-Ök.); Akademie für Gesellschaftswissenschaften beim ZK der SED (Dr. rer. oec.)
- Occupation: Politician; Party Functionary; Economist
- Awards: Order of Karl Marx; Patriotic Order of Merit, 1st class; Banner of Labor
- Central institution membership: 1967–1989: Full member, Central Committee; Other offices held: 1974–1976: Second Secretary, Socialist Unity Party in Bezirk Potsdam; 1966–1967: Second Secretary, Free German Youth

Günther Jahn (9 January 1930 – 29 October 2015) was an East German economist, politician and functionary of the Free German Youth (FDJ) and the Socialist Unity Party (SED).

Originally a socialist economist working on Walter Ulbricht's New Economic System, Jahn eventually became First Secretary of the FDJ and later First Secretary of the Bezirk Potsdam SED. Though not known for straying from the party line, he was the first high-ranking SED official to call on Erich Honecker to resign during the Peaceful Revolution.

== Life and career ==
=== Early career ===
Günther Jahn was born in Erfurt on 9 January 1930. His father was the locksmith and Communist Party of Germany (KPD) functionary Hermann Jahn. He was a member of the Jungvolk and the Hitler Youth from 1940 to 1945. After the war, in 1946, he joined the Free German Youth (FDJ) and the KPD. He became a member of the Socialist Unity Party (SED) following the KPD's forced merger with the SPD later that year. He obtained his Abitur in 1948 from the Humboldt School in Erfurt and began studying economics at the University of Jena, graduating in 1952 from the University of Economics Berlin with a diploma in economics (Dipl.-Ök.).

In 1954, Jahn joined the apparatus of the Central Committee of the SED as a political employee in the Planning Sector of the Central Committee Planning and Finance Department. He held that role until 1956 to become a aspirant (doctoral candidate) at the Academy for Social Sciences at the Central Committee of the SED. He earned a doctorate in economics (Dr. rer. oec.) in 1961, working as a visiting lecturer at the Academy for another year before returning to his old job at the Planning and Finance Department.

In 1964, Jahn was promoted to become the deputy head of the Department for Ideological Work at the Office for Industry and Construction at the SED Politburo. A year later he was made head of the newly created Socialist Economic Management Working Group, which was tasked with the training of future economic cadres. In these roles, Jahn was involved in the development of Walter Ulbricht's New Economic System.

=== Free German Youth ===
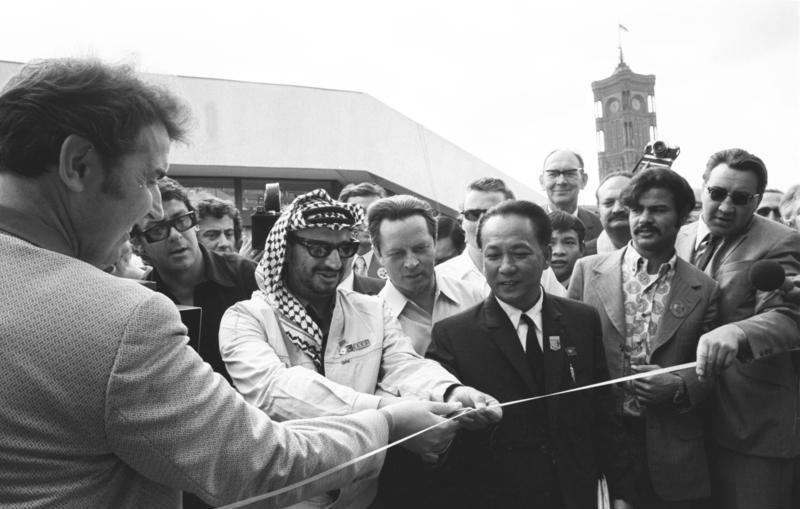
Jahn (left) and PLO leader Yasser Arafat (left of center) at the 10th World Festival of Youth and Students in East Berlin in July 1973

In 1966, Jahn was transferred to the FDJ as Second Secretary. He was elected First Secretary of the FDJ in May 1967 following Horst Schumann's retirement.

He had already been made a full member of the Central Committee of the SED in April (VII. Party Congress) and joined the Volkskammer in July, nominally representing the rural southwest of Bezirk Erfurt until 1976, then Potsdam and its suburbs.

During his time as the top FDJ official, he was informally mocked as "Jubel-Jahn" (English: Jubilant Jahn) due to his impulsive exclamations like "Long live international solidarity" at political events.

On 17 August 1970, Red Army Faction terrorist Ulrike Meinhof asked for a meeting with Jahn. Though not granted, the attempt marked the beginning of the GDR's covert support of the RAF and their members.

=== Bezirk Potsdam SED career ===
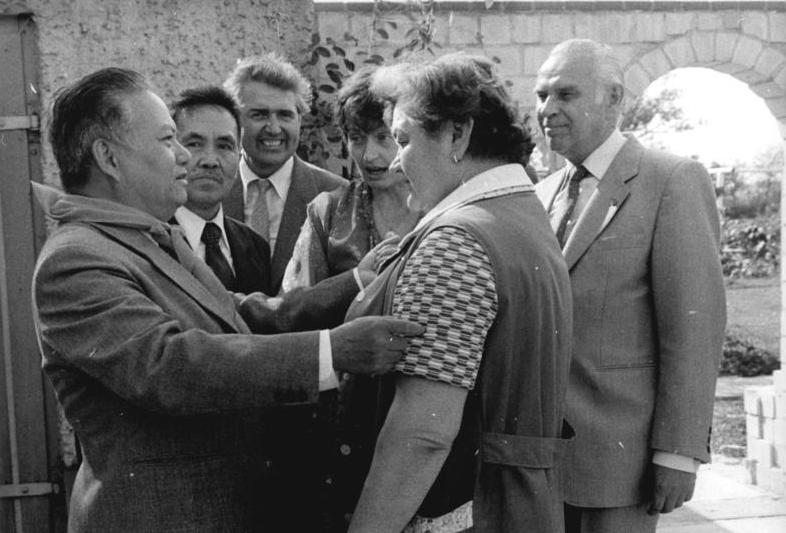
Jahn (center) and Lao People's Revolutionary Party head Kaysone Phomvihane (left) visiting farmers in Satzkorn, now a part of Potsdam, in September 1982

Jahn retired as First Secretary of the FDJ in January 1974 and was succeeded by Egon Krenz. He joined the Bezirk Potsdam SED as Second Secretary later that year, rising to First Secretary in January 1976 after longtime incumbent Werner Wittig surprisingly died. Unlike other First Secretaries such as Hans Modrow, Jahn did not become known for being outspoken, strictly executing party decisions.

He took interest in Potsdam's movie industry, personally taking charge of the planning and securing financial aid of the GDR's film museum, opened in 1981. At the same time, artists also feared backlash from him regarding political content. For example, Jahn made sure a political satire was stopped to be played in 1989.

=== Peaceful Revolution ===
Though initially opposed to dialogue with demonstrators and reforms, Jahn eventually criticized Erich Honecker shortly before his downfall, accusing him of weak leadership and asking him to resign. On 15 November 1989, he resigned as First Secretary, and in December of the same year, he resigned alongside the entire SED Central Committee. The Bezirk Potsdam SED choose reformer Heinz Vietze as his successor.

After the Peaceful Revolution, Jahn went into retirement, refusing to give interviews. In autumn 1991, he left the SED's successor party, the Party of Democratic Socialism (PDS). He died on 29 October 2015, at the age of 85, in Fichtenwalde.
