= Egon Krenz =

Leader of East Germany in 1989

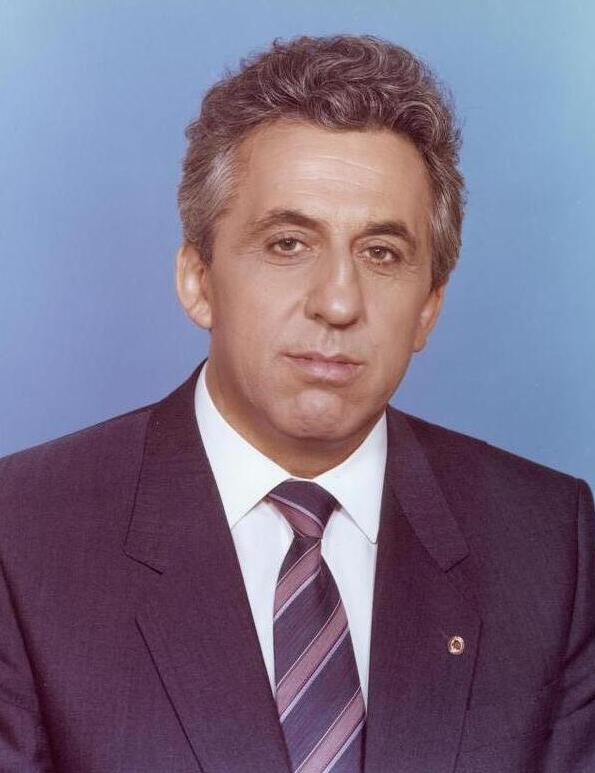
- Official portrait, 1984

General Secretary of the Socialist Unity Party
- In office 18 October 1989 – 3 December 1989
- Deputy: Günter Schabowski
- Preceded by: Erich Honecker
- Succeeded by: Herbert Kroker (interim); Gregor Gysi (as Chairman)

Chairman of the State Council
- In office 24 October 1989 – 6 December 1989
- Preceded by: Erich Honecker
- Succeeded by: Manfred Gerlach

Chairman of the National Defense Council
- In office 18 October 1989 – 6 December 1989
- Secretary: Fritz Streletz
- Preceded by: Erich Honecker
- Succeeded by: Office abolished Manfred Gerlach (as Chairman of the State Council)

First Secretary of the Free German Youth
- In office 9 January 1974 – 1 December 1983
- Second Secretary: Wolfgang Herger; Erich Postler; Eberhard Aurich
- Preceded by: Günther Jahn
- Succeeded by: Eberhard Aurich

Chairman of the Ernst Thälmann Pioneer Organisation
- In office 8 February 1971 – 9 January 1974
- Preceded by: Werner Engst
- Succeeded by: Helga Labs
Volkskammer
Member of the Volkskammer for Bezirk Rostock
In office 29 October 1976 – 11 January 1990
Preceded by	Constituency established
Succeeded by	Bernd Blässe
Constituency	Greifswald-Stadt, Greifswald-Land, Grimmen, Rügen, Stralsund-Stadt, Stralsund-Land, Wolgast, №1
In office 14 November 1971 – 29 October 1976
Preceded by	Peter Gerdum
Succeeded by	Constituency abolished
Constituency	Rostock-Stadt, Wismar-Stadt, Stralsund-Stadt, №5

Central Committee Secretariat responsibilities
- 1983–1989: Security Affairs
- 1983–1989: State and Legal Affairs
- 1983–1989: Youth
- 1983–1989: Sports

Personal details
- Born: Egon Rudi Ernst Krenz; 19 March 1937 (age 89) Kolberg, Province of Pomerania, Free State of Prussia, Nazi Germany (now Kołobrzeg, Poland)
- Party: Independent
- Other political affiliations: Socialist Unity Party (1955–1990)
- Spouse: Erika Krenz (m. 1961; died 2017)
- Children: 2
- Occupation: Politician; Locksmith; Teacher
- Awards: Order of Karl Marx; Banner of Labor
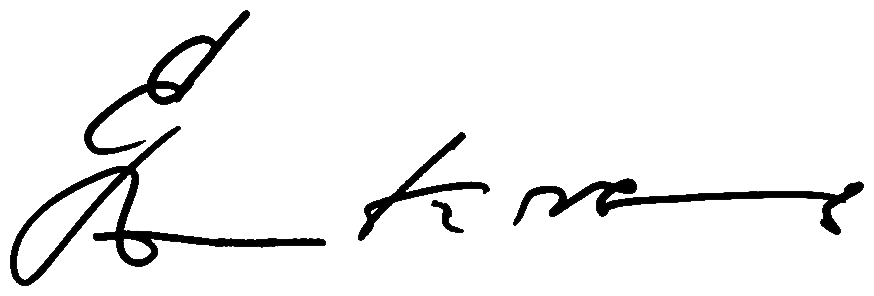
- Signature
- Criminal information
- Status: Served prison sentence 13 January 2000 – 18 December 2003, released on parole until 2006
- Conviction: Manslaughter (4 counts)
- Penalty: 6½ years imprisonment
- Central institution membership: 1983–1989: Full member, Politburo of the Central Committee; 1976–1983: Candidate member, Politburo of the Central Committee; 1973–1989: Full member, Central Committee; 1971–1973: Candidate member, Central Committee; Other offices held: 1985–1989: Member, National Defence Council; 1984–1989: Deputy Chairman, State Council; 1981–1989: Member, State Council; 1971–1976: Volkskammer Chairman, Free German Youth
- De facto leader of the GDR: ← Honecker; Modrow →

Egon Rudi Ernst Krenz (German pronunciation: [ˈeːgɔn ˈkʁɛnts]; born 19 March 1937) is a German former politician who was the last Communist leader of the German Democratic Republic (East Germany) during the Revolutions of 1989. He succeeded Erich Honecker as the General Secretary of the ruling Socialist Unity Party of Germany (SED) but was forced to resign only weeks later when the Berlin Wall fell.

Throughout his career, Krenz held a number of prominent positions in the SED. He was Honecker's deputy from 1984 until he succeeded him in 1989 amid protests against the regime. Krenz was unsuccessful in his attempt to retain the Communist regime's grip on power due to the chaotic management of travel policies at the time and prolonged popular discontent. The SED gave up its monopoly of power some weeks after the fall of the Berlin Wall, and Krenz was forced to resign shortly afterward. He was expelled from the SED's successor party on 21 January 1990.

In 2000, he was sentenced to six and a half years in prison for manslaughter for his role in the Communist regime. After his release from prison in 2003, he retired to the small town of Dierhagen in Mecklenburg-Vorpommern. He remained on parole until the end of his sentence in 2006. Krenz, Karel Urbánek from Czechoslovakia and Gombojavyn Ochirbat from Mongolia are the last three former General Secretaries and leaders from the Eastern Bloc still alive.

== Early years ==
Krenz was born to German parents in Kolberg, then part of Nazi Germany in what is now part of Poland. In his autobiography, Krenz suggested that his father, who died in 1943, was of Jewish descent. His family resettled in Damgarten in 1945 during the mass repatriations and expulsions of Germans from Poland at the end of World War II.

== Political career in East Germany ==
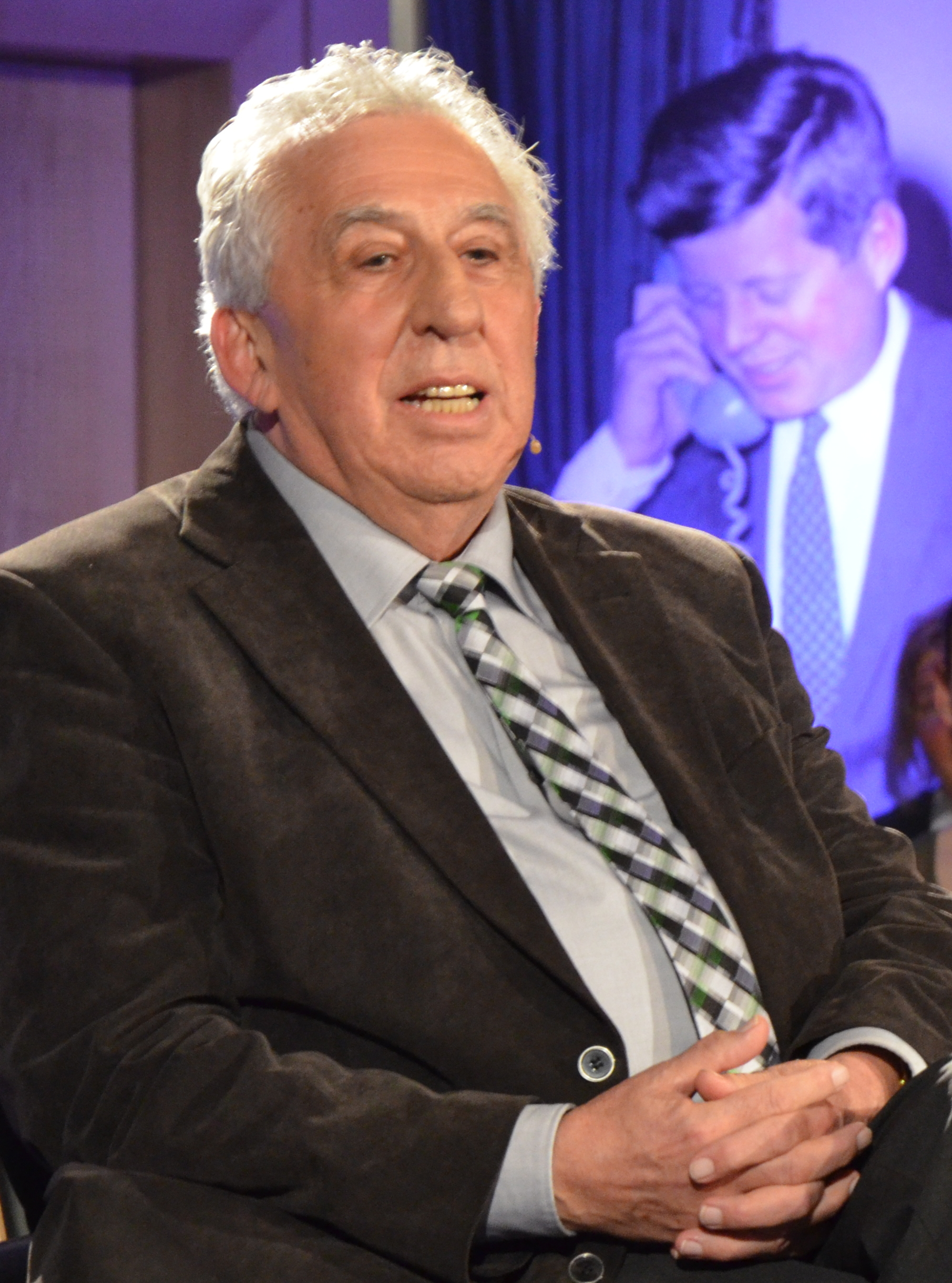
Krenz in 2013, at a German-American evening at the U.S. Consulate General in Munich

Trained as a teacher and working as a journalist early in his career, Krenz joined the Free German Youth (FDJ) in 1953, as a teenager and the Socialist Unity Party of Germany (SED) in 1955. After serving in the Volksarmee from 1959 to 1961, he rejoined the FDJ. He studied at a prestigious Communist Party staff school in Moscow for three years, became a nomenklatura member and obtained a social science degree by 1967. Throughout his career, Krenz held a number of posts in the SED and the communist government. He was leader of the Ernst Thälmann Pioneer Organisation from 1971 to 1974, and became a member of the central committee of the party in 1973. He was also a member of the Volkskammer (East Germany's legislature) from 1971 to 1990, and a member of its presidium from 1971 to 1981. Between 1974 and 1983, he was leader of the communist youth movement, the Free German Youth. From 1981 to 1984 he was a member of the Council of State.

In 1983, he joined the Politburo and became the Secretary for Security, Youth and Sport in the Central Committee; the same position Honecker had held before becoming General Secretary. He rose to supreme prominence when he became Honecker's deputy on the Council of State in 1984. Around the same time, he replaced Paul Verner as the unofficial number-two man in the SED leadership, thus making him the second-most powerful man in the country. Although he was the youngest member of the Politburo (and indeed, one of only two people elevated to full membership in that body from 1976 to 1984), speculation abounded that Honecker had tapped him as his heir apparent.

== Leader of the German Democratic Republic ==
Following popular protests against East Germany's communist government, Prime Minister Willi Stoph moved that the SED Politburo "release" Honecker as General Secretary of the SED Central Committee, naming Krenz his successor. Krenz had been approached several months earlier about ousting Honecker, but was reluctant to move against a man he called "my foster father and political teacher". He was initially willing to wait until the seriously ill Honecker died, but by October was convinced that the situation was too grave to wait for what he had called "a biological solution".

Despite many protests, the Volkskammer elected Krenz to both of Honecker's major state posts—Chairman of the Council of State and Chairman of the National Defence Council. The former post was equivalent to that of president, while the latter post made Krenz commander-in-chief of the National People's Army. For only the second time in the Volkskammer's forty-year history, the vote was not unanimous (the first was on the law on abortion); 26 deputies voted against and 26 abstained.

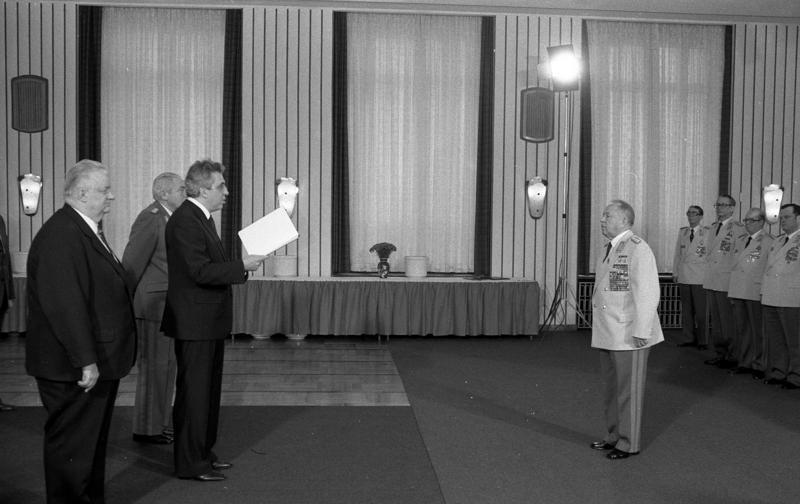
Krenz (left) officially congratulating Erich Mielke on behalf of the government on the occasion of the 35th anniversary of the Stasi in 1985. Behind Mielke are other high-ranking officials of the Stasi.

In his first address as leader, Krenz promised to blunt some of the harsher edges of Honecker's regime and promised democratic reforms. The speech was identical to the one he had given to a closed group of the SED Central Committee; he even addressed the national audience as "Genossen" (comrades)–a term reserved for members of the SED. The speech sounded formulaic, and few East Germans believed him. For instance, they still remembered that after the Tiananmen Square protest just months earlier, he had gone to China to thank Deng Xiaoping on behalf of the regime. In Honecker's resignation speech, he named Krenz as his successor, further conveying an impression of undemocratic intransigence. For this and other reasons, Krenz was almost as detested as Honecker had been; one popular joke suggested that the only difference between them was that Krenz still had a gallbladder. Indeed, almost as soon as he took power, thousands of East Germans took to the streets to demand his resignation.

Also on the same day he took office, Krenz received a top secret report from planning chief Gerhard Schürer that showed the depths of East Germany's economic crisis. It showed that East Germany did not have enough money to make payments on the massive foreign loans that propped up the economy, and it was now DM123 billion in debt. Although Krenz had been the number-two man in the administration, Honecker had kept the true state of the economy a secret from him. Krenz was forced to send Alexander Schalck-Golodkowski to beg West Germany for a short-term loan to make interest payments. However, West Germany was unwilling to even consider negotiations until the SED abandoned power and allowed free elections—something that Krenz was unwilling to concede.

This was not the only evidence that Krenz did not intend to truly open up the regime. While publicly discussing such reforms as loosening travel restrictions, he also personally ordered the rejection of the dissident group New Forum's application to become an approved organisation. Ahead of the large Alexanderplatz demonstration on 4 November, he ordered the Stasi to prevent any unauthorised attempt to cross the border by "bodily violence".

On 7 November, Krenz approved the resignation of Prime Minister Willi Stoph and his entire cabinet along with two-thirds of the Politburo. However, the Central Committee unanimously re-elected Krenz to the position of General Secretary. In a speech, Krenz attempted a reckoning with history, which also criticised his political mentor Honecker. Yet, by this stage, events were rapidly spiralling out of his control.

Despite promises of reform, public opposition to the regime continued to grow. In an attempt to stem the tide, Krenz authorised the reopening of the border with Czechoslovakia, which had been sealed to prevent East Germans from fleeing to West Germany. The newly formed Politburo agreed to adopt new regulations for trips to the West by way of a Council of Ministers resolution.

== Opening of the Berlin Wall ==
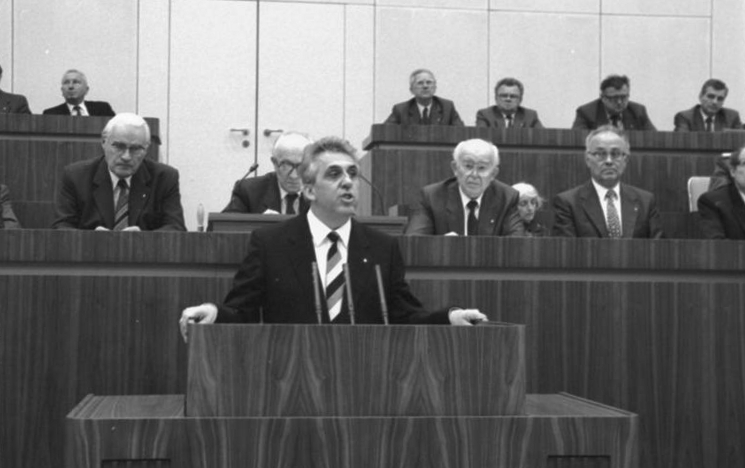
Krenz addressing the Volkskammer on 24 October 1989

On 6 November, the Interior Ministry published a draft of new travel regulations. While branded as a major change, in truth the draft made only cosmetic changes to Honecker-era rules. While state offices were supposed to approve applications "quickly", it actually took up to 30 days to process applications for ordinary travel abroad and up to six months for emigration. Not only could applications be denied for the usual reasons (national security, public order, public health, public morals, etc.), no guarantees were made that people travelling abroad would get access to foreign currency. The draft enraged ordinary citizens and was denounced as "complete trash" by West Berlin Mayor Walter Momper.

In a case of particularly bad timing, the draft was published just days after the government allowed travel to Czechoslovakia to resume. This resulted in a flood of refugees crowding onto the steps of the West German embassy in Prague. The enraged Czechoslovaks gave their East German counterparts an ultimatum: unless the matter was dealt with at once, Prague would have to seriously consider sealing off the East German-Czechoslovak border. At a Politburo meeting on 7 November, it was decided to enact the section of the draft travel regulations addressing permanent emigration immediately. Initially, the Politburo planned to create a special border crossing near Schirnding specifically for this emigration. The Interior and Stasi bureaucrats charged with crafting the new text, however, concluded this was not feasible, and crafted a new text relating to both emigration and temporary travel. It stipulated that East German citizens could apply for permission to travel abroad without having to meet the previous requirements for those trips and also allowed for permanent emigration between all border crossings—including those between East and West Berlin.

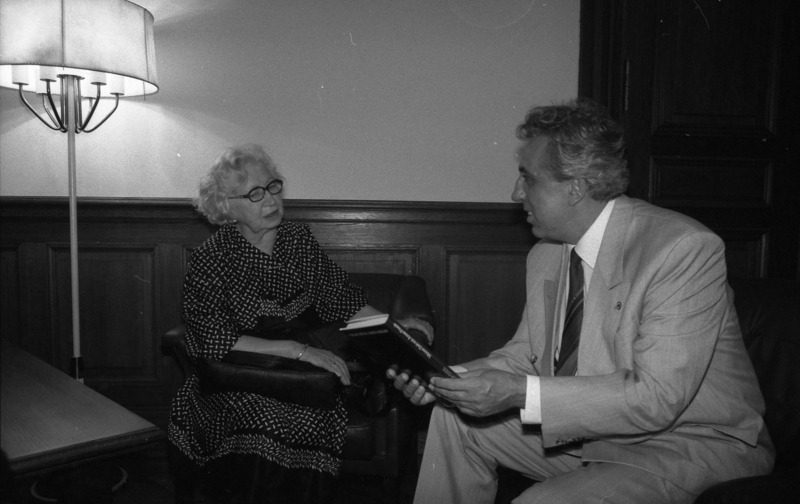
Miep Gies and Krenz in 1989

The new text was completed on 9 November. However, no one briefed the Politburo's de facto spokesman, East Berlin party boss Günter Schabowski, that the regulations were going to come into effect the following afternoon. Thus, at the daily press conference, when a reporter asked when the regulations would come into force, Schabowski assumed they were already in effect and replied, "As far as I know—immediately, without delay." Excerpts from the press conference aired on West German television, which was viewable in most of East Germany. This prompted a mass exodus to the Berlin Wall by thousands of East Berliners, believing the statement to be a decision to open the border crossings at the Wall. Krenz and the rest of the leadership were unwilling to order the use of deadly force. Finally, the unprepared and outnumbered border guards, on their own authority, let the crowds pass into West Berlin.

The fall of the Berlin Wall destroyed Krenz and the SED politically. On 18 November, Krenz swore in a new coalition government. Instead of an oath, it consisted of a simple handshake. However, it was obvious that the SED was living on borrowed time. The CDU and the LDPD, long subservient to the SED, threw out their pro-Communist leaderships and announced that they were leaving the National Front. The new CDU Presidium, under the leadership of Lothar de Maizière, also demanded the resignation of Krenz as chairman of the Council of State and Chairman of the National Defense Council.

On 1 December, the Volkskammer significantly amended the East German constitution to purge it of its Communist elements. Most notably, Article One, which declared East Germany to be a socialist state under the leadership of the SED, was deleted. Two days later, the entire Politburo and Central Committee—including Krenz—resigned and a working committee took over direction of the party. On 6 December 1989, Krenz resigned from his remaining leadership posts. He was succeeded as head of state by LDPD leader Manfred Gerlach. In a bid to rehabilitate itself ahead of East Germany's first free election, the successor organisation to the SED, the Party of Democratic Socialism, expelled Krenz and several other former leaders of the Communist regime in 1990.

== Trial and imprisonment ==
In 1997, Krenz was sentenced to six-and-a-half years' imprisonment for Cold War crimes, specifically manslaughter of four Germans attempting to escape East Germany over the Berlin Wall. He was also charged with electoral fraud, along with other criminal offences.

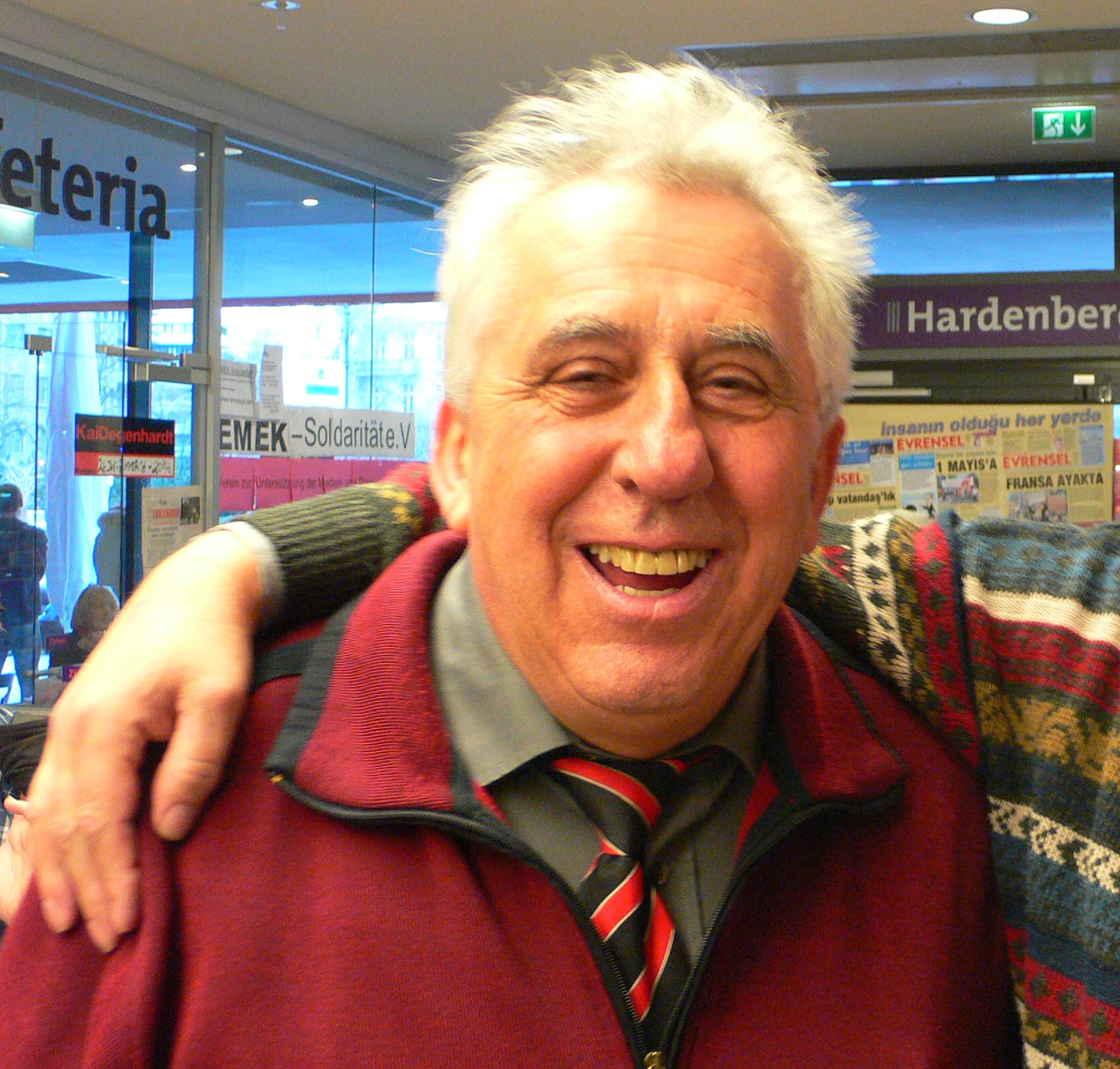
Krenz in 2007

He appealed, arguing that the legal framework of the newly reunited German state did not apply to events that had taken place in the former East Germany. Krenz also argued that the prosecution of former East German officials was a breach of a personal agreement given by West German Chancellor Helmut Kohl to Soviet President Mikhail Gorbachev during their talks, which led to German reunification. However, the verdict was upheld in 1999. Krenz reportedly described his conviction as "victor's justice" and "cold war in court", saying, "The victorious power is avenging itself on the representatives of the defeated power."

Krenz began serving his sentence in Hakenfelde Prison shortly thereafter, working in the prison laundry. He was later transferred to Plötzensee Prison, a prison with stricter rules, where he worked in the prison laundry and as an inmate orderly. Krenz's application to the European Court of Human Rights on alleged misuse of East German criminal laws reached the Grand Chamber, but was rejected in 2001.

He was released from prison in December 2003 after serving nearly four years of his sentence, and quietly retired with his wife Erika (1939–2017) to Dierhagen in Mecklenburg-Vorpommern. He remained on parole until the end of his sentence in 2006.

== Later life ==
Krenz currently lives in Dierhagen, a town on the Baltic Sea coast in Mecklenburg-Vorpommern. Unlike other high-ranking former members of the SED, such as Günter Schabowski and Günther Kleiber, Krenz still defends the former East German regime and maintains his political views.

Krenz is fluent in Russian and has praised Russian president Vladimir Putin, saying "After weak presidents like Gorbachev and Yeltsin, it is a great fortune for Russia that it has Putin", while believing that the Cold War never ended. He is a Russophile and has implied that he is a popular emblem of Ostalgie. During the Russian invasion of Ukraine, he has expressed his support for peace negotiations and his opposition to Germany and other Western countries sending weapons to Ukraine. Furthermore, he has called for an end to all sanctions against Russia, Iran, Venezuela, Cuba and North Korea. He has also praised China, saying "absolute poverty has been eliminated" there.

Krenz gave a speech in October 2024 to commemorate the 75th anniversary of the founding of the German Democratic Republic, in which he defended the GDR and its legacy, saying, "Despite everything, the GDR proved in the center of Europe that life without capitalists was possible even in highly industrialized Germany."

In June 2026, during an interview, Krenz noted that the rise of AfD in the former DDR is a product of discontent over traditional politics, rather than endorsement for their proposed policies. At the same time, he voiced support for Sahra Wagenknecht and her BSW party. Coincidentally, she also served as a member of the SED during Krenz's leadership in 1989.

Political offices
Preceded by Erich Honecker	General Secretary of the Central Committee of the Socialist Unity Party of Germany; 1989	Office abolished Party renamed the Party of Democratic Socialism
Preceded by Erich Honecker	Chairman of the Council of State of the German Democratic Republic; 1989	Succeeded by Manfred Gerlach
