= Werner Wittig (politician) =

German politician (1926–1976)

First Secretary of the Socialist Unity Party in Bezirk Potsdam
- In office 3 June 1964 – 8 January 1976
- Second Secretary: Siegfried Pohl; Werner Eidner; Günther Jahn
- Preceded by: Kurt Seibt
- Succeeded by: Günther Jahn
Volkskammer
Member of the Volkskammer for Gransee, Neuruppin, Kyritz, Wittstock, Pritzwalk
In office 14 July 1967 – 8 January 1976
Preceded by	multi-member district
Succeeded by	Werner Kalweit

Personal details
- Born: Werner Wittig; 24 October 1926 Lüttewitz, Free State of Saxony, Weimar Republic (now Germany)
- Died: 8 January 1976 (aged 49) Potsdam, Bezirk Potsdam, East Germany
- Party: Socialist Unity Party (1946–1976)
- Other political affiliations: Social Democratic Party (1945–1946); Nazi Party (1944–1945)
- Education: CPSU Higher Party School "W. I. Lenin" (Dipl.-Ges.-Wiss.)
- Occupation: Politician; Party Functionary; Commercial Clerk
- Awards: Patriotic Order of Merit, 2nd class; Banner of Labor; Order of Karl Marx; Medal Brotherhood in Arms
- Central institution membership: 1967–1976: Full member, Central Committee; Other offices held: 1961–1964: First Secretary, Socialist Unity Party in Brandenburg-Stadt; 1952–1953: First Secretary, Socialist Unity Party in Potsdam-Stadt

Werner Wittig (24 October 1926 – 8 January 1976) was a German politician and party functionary of the Socialist Unity Party (SED).

One of a few former Nazis to have a political career in East Germany, Wittig rose to the position of First Secretary of the Bezirk Potsdam SED and became a member of the SED Central Committee.

Wittig's career was only cut short when he surprisingly died in January 1976 at the age of 49.

== Life and career ==
=== Early career ===
As the son of a farm laborer, he attended elementary school in Luckenwalde from 1933 to 1941 and completed an apprenticeship as a commercial clerk there from 1942 to 1944. Wittig applied for membership in the NSDAP on 17 February 1944, and was admitted on 20 April (Hitler's birthday) of the same year (membership number 10,090,408). From June 1944 to May 1945, he was a soldier in the Wehrmacht.

After the war, he initially worked as a kitchen helper in a large kitchen in Luckenwalde. In August 1945, he became a member of the SPD (Social Democratic Party of Germany), and after the forced merger of the SPD and KPD (Communist Party of Germany) into the SED in the Soviet Occupation Zone (SBZ) in 1946, he became a member of the SED (Socialist Unity Party of Germany).

After attending the State Party School in Schmerwitz near Wiesenburg/Mark, he worked full-time for the SED. His first role was as the state youth secretary of the Mark Brandenburg SED (1946/47). From 1948, he was the personal assistant to the chairman of the Brandenburg SED, Willy Sägebrecht, and from January 1949, head of the department in the office of the state chairman of the SED.

From April 1952 to August 1953, he was the First Secretary of the SED in Potsdam City in the then State of Brandenburg and later Bezirk Potsdam. After attending the CPSU Higher Party School "W. I. Lenin" in Moscow from 1953 to 1956, he was appointed department head in the Bezirk Potsdam SED.

Subsequently, from January 1961 to June 1964, he was the First Secretary of the SED in Brandenburg an der Havel.

=== Bezirk Potsdam SED First Secretary ===
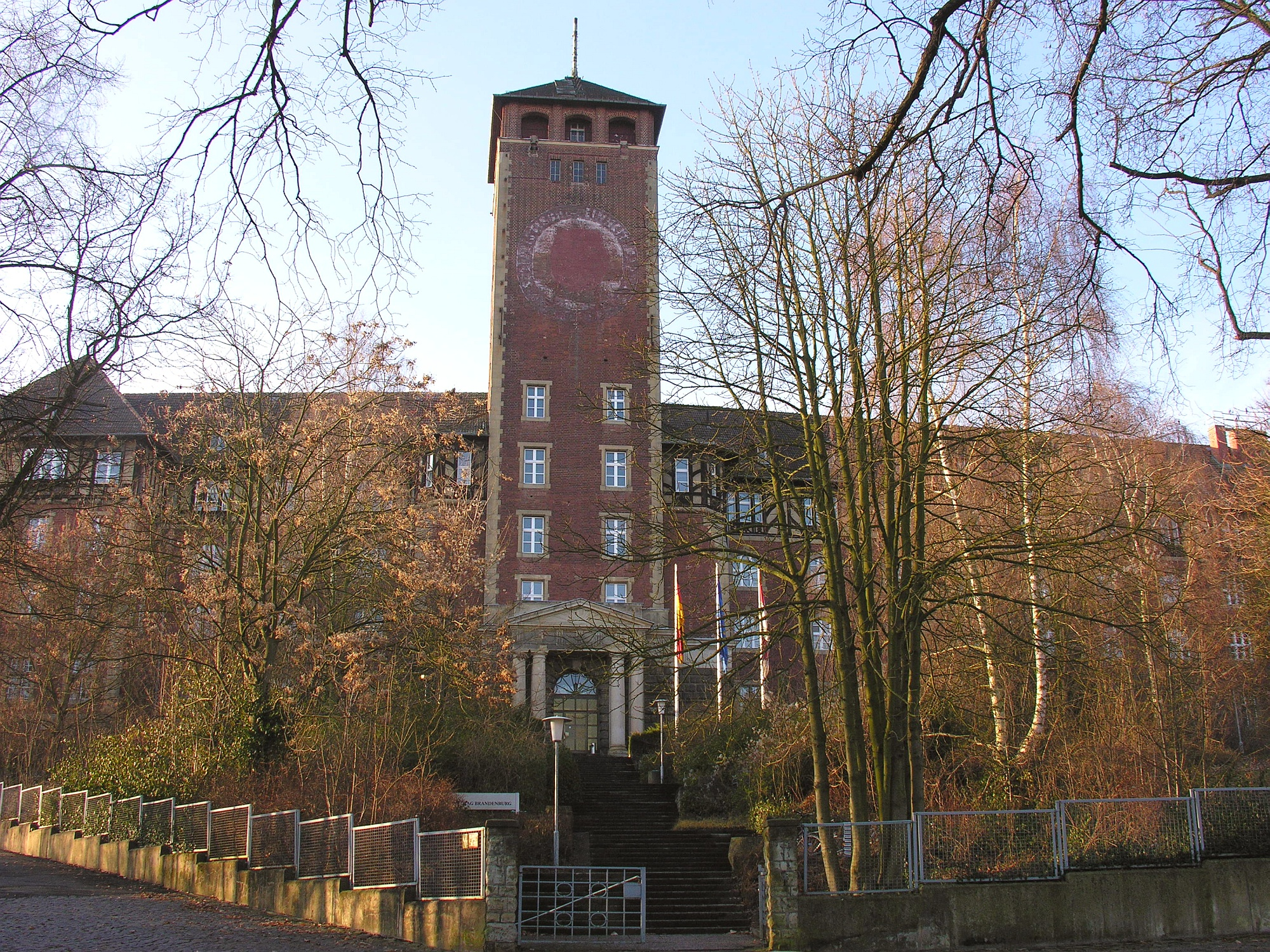
Former Bezirk Potsdam SED building in 2008. The SED's logo still is faintly visible.

In June 1964, Wittig rose to the position of the First Secretary of the Bezirk Potsdam SED, longtime incumbent Kurt Seibt joining the Council of Ministers of East Germany as Minister of the newly created Ministry for the Guidance and Control of Bezirk and District Councils.

Wittig additionally became a full member of the Central Committee of the SED in April 1967 (VII. Party Congress) and the Volkskammer in later that year, nominally representing a constituency in the rural north of his Bezirk.

On behalf of Walter Ulbricht, Wittig was one of the main people responsible for the demolition of the Garnisonkirche ruins, despite opposition from a small part of the city council, including allegedly the then mayor of Potsdam, Brunhilde Hanke.

In 1970, Erich Honecker proposed him along with Harry Tisch as the chairman of the Volkskammer Committee for National Defense and successor to the late Paul Fröhlich. However, this failed due to a calculated move by Honecker, who proposed Hermann Matern at the last minute, as his preferred candidate, Paul Verner, would not have been accepted by Ulbricht, and he saw Matern as an interim solution until the planned ousting of Ulbricht.

Wittig was awarded the Patriotic Order of Merit in silver in 1965, the Banner of Labor in 1969, the Medal Brotherhood in Arms in gold in 1970 and the Kampforden „Für Verdienste um Volk und Vaterland“ in gold.

=== Death ===
Wittig unexpectedly died in Potsdam in January 1976 at the age of 49. He was succeeded by his deputy Günther Jahn.

During the GDR era, a POS in today's Berlin district of Staaken (Spandau borough), the Potsdam Polytechnic Secondary School 45, and a street in the Waldstadt II residential area were named after him. His grave is located in an honor grove at the New Cemetery in Potsdam.
