= Siegfried Lorenz (politician) =

German politician

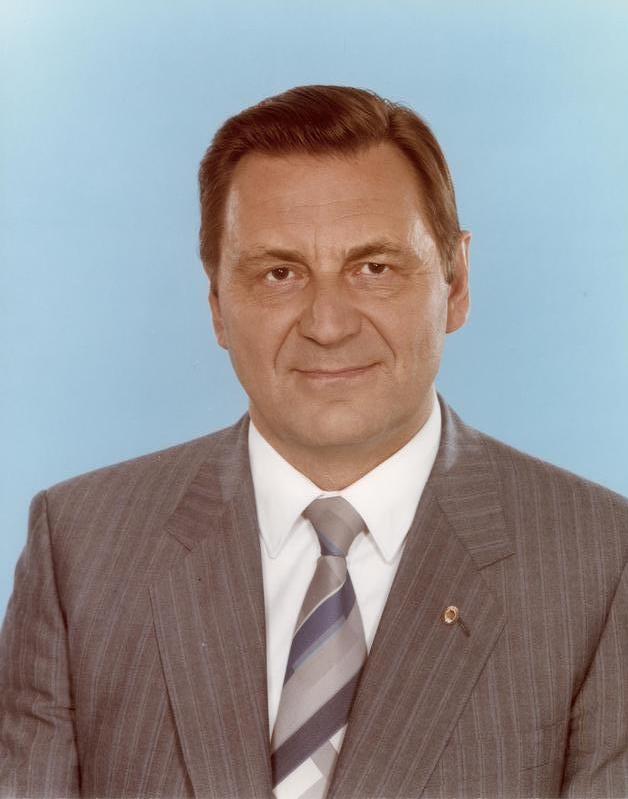
- Lorenz in 1986

First Secretary of the Socialist Unity Party in Bezirk Karl-Marx-Stadt
- In office March 1976 – November 1989
- Second Secretary: Rudi Scharrer; Lothar Weber
- Preceded by: Paul Roscher
- Succeeded by: Norbert Kertscher

Head of the Youth Department of the Central Committee
- In office 14 September 1966 – 24 March 1976
- Secretary: Erich Honecker; Paul Verner
- Deputy: Gerhardt Naumann
- Preceded by: Gerhardt Naumann
- Succeeded by: Wolfgang Herger

First Secretary of the Free German Youth in Berlin
- In office 1961–1965
- Preceded by: Hans Modrow
- Succeeded by: Lothar Witt
Volkskammer
Member of the Volkskammer
In office 14 November 1963 – 11 January 1990
Preceded by	multi-member district
Succeeded by	Constituency abolished

Personal details
- Born: 26 November 1930 (age 95) Annaberg, Free State of Saxony, Weimar Republic (now Annaberg-Buchholz, Saxony, Germany)
- Party: Socialist Unity Party (1946–1989)
- Other political affiliations: Social Democratic Party (1945–1964)
- Education: Leipzig University; Party Academy Karl Marx
- Occupation: Politician; Civil Servant; Party Clerk
- Awards: Order of Karl Marx; Banner of Labor
- Central institution membership: 1986–1989: Full member, Politburo of the Central Committee; 1985–1986: Candidate member, Politburo of the Central Committee; 1971–1989: Full member, Central Committee; 1967–1971: Candidate member, Central Committee; Other offices held: 1967–1976: Head, Youth Commission at the Politburo; 1958–1961: Second Secretary, Free German Youth in Berlin; 1958–1967: Member, East Berlin City Council

Siegfried Lorenz (born 26 November 1930) is a former senior party functionary of the ruling Socialist Unity Party of Germany (SED / Sozialistische Einheitspartei Deutschlands) in East Germany. He was a member of the Politbüro of The Party's Central Committee in Berlin and First Secretary of the party's Karl-Marx-Stadt regional leadership team. During his career held a number of positions with the country's FDJ (Free German Youth movement).

On 6 August 2004, fifteen years after the Wall came down, Lorenz, then aged 73, was one of two senior party officials found guilty by the Berlin regional court as accessories to murder. The case involved Michael Bittner, Lutz Schmidt and Chris Gueffroy, three citizens of the former German Democratic Republic who had been shot dead while trying to escape to West Berlin.

== Life ==
=== Early years ===
The son of a dyer and a seamstress, after leaving school Lorenz worked as an agricultural assistant and an errand boy between 1944 and 1945.

=== Politics and The Party ===
He joined the SPD (Social Democratic Party of Germany/Sozialdemokratische Partei Deutschlands) in 1945 and the FDJ (Free German Youth/Freie Deutsche Jugend) in 1946. This part of Germany was occupied by the Soviet military in 1945 and the Soviet Union took a hands-on approach to reconfiguring the political landscape. The Soviets favoured a one-party political structure. The SPD, along with the KPD (German Communist Party/Kommunistische Partei Deutschlands) were forcibly merged into the SED (Socialist Unity Party of Germany/Sozialistische Einheitspartei Deutschlands), of which Siegfried Lorenz now became a committed member.

In 1946 he was employed in a clerical capacity by the SED party leadership in Annaberg. From 1946 to 1947 he was secretary to the local leadership of the FDJ (youth movement).

=== Further education ===
In 1947 he attended the Economics School at Annaberg, moving on for 1948/49 to the ABF (literally "Workers and Farmers Faculty" / "Arbeiter-und-Bauern-Fakultät") at Chemnitz and Leipzig universities. Then he studied Social Sciences at Leipzig University. After this, till 1953, he was the Students' Section Leader with the Central Council of the FDJ.

Following a further period of study at the Berlin Region Party School, in 1954 he was appointed Secretary for Agitation and Propaganda for the Berlin Region FDJ, a position he held till 1956. Yet more study followed, this time at the prestigious Karl Marx High School, from which he emerged with a diploma in Social sciences.

=== Political promotions ===
In January 1958 he was appointed Second Secretary of the Berlin region FDJ, becoming First Secretary from 1961 till 1968. Additionally, between 1958 and 1967 he was a Berlin city councilor and a candidate-member of the Berlin SED Party leadership.

=== National politics ===
From 1961 right through till 1976 Lorenz was a member of the Central Council of the FDJ, where between 1963 and 1967 he represented Berlin. From 1963 till 1990 he was a deputy in the National Legislature where his positions included membership and chairmanship of the Youth Committee.

In 1965/66 he held leadership of the party's Media department for the regional Berlin leadership. From 1966 till 1976 he headed up the Youth Department of The Party, while simultaneously holding the position of Youth Commissioner with the Central Committee of the party's Politburo. He was himself a candidate for membership of the Central Committee in 1967, becoming a member of it in 1971.

Away from Berlin, between March 1976 and November 1989 Siegfried Lorenz was First Secretary of the SED regional leadership for Chemnitz in the south of the country. (It was in an outer suburb of Karl-Marx-Stadt, which has subsequently reverted to its earlier name, Chemnitz, that Lorenz had been born and started out on his political career.) In 1985 he gained candidature for the Politburo of the party's central committee, becoming a Politburo member in 1986.

== Recognition ==
- 1964, 1969 und 1973 Patriotic Order of Merit (Vaterländischer Verdienstorden)
- 1975 Combat Medal "for Services to the People and Fatherland" (Kampforden „Für Verdienste um Volk und Vaterland“ )
- 1980 Order of Karl Marx (Karl-Marx-Orden)
- 1984 Banner of Labor (Banner der Arbeit)
