= Günther Kleiber =

German politician (1931–2013)

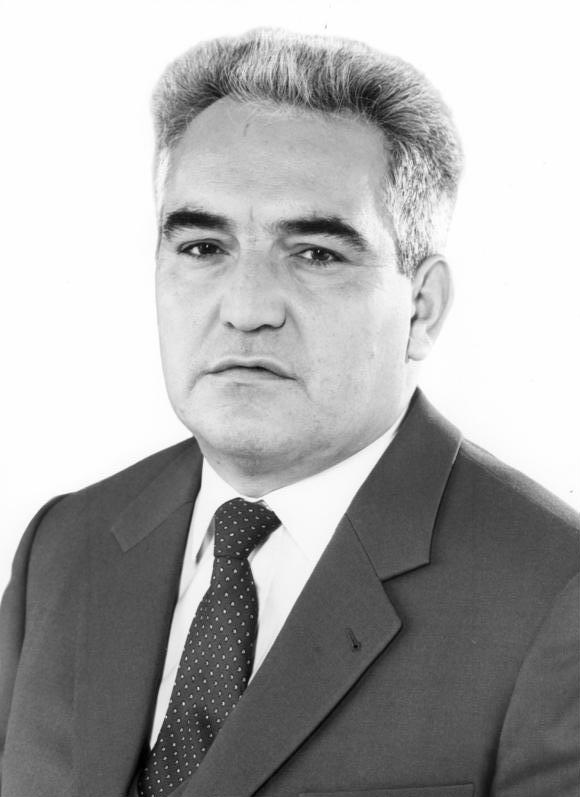
- Kleiber in 1981

First Deputy Chairman of the Council of Ministers
- In office 4 November 1988 – 7 November 1989 Serving with Alfred Neumann
- Chairman: Willi Stoph
- Preceded by: Werner Krolikowski
- Succeeded by: Position abolished

Permanent Representative of the GDR in Comecon
- In office February 1986 – 4 November 1988
- Chairman of the Council of Ministers: Willi Stoph
- Preceded by: Gerhard Weiss
- Succeeded by: Horst Sölle

Minister for General Mechanical, Agricultural Machinery and Vehicle Construction
- In office 1 November 1976 – 12 March 1986
- Chairman of the Council of Ministers: Willi Stoph
- Preceded by: Rudi Georgi
- Succeeded by: Gerhard Tautenhahn
Volkskammer
Member of the Volkskammer for Frankfurt/Oder, Beeskow, Eisenhüttenstadt-Stadt, Eisenhüttenstadt-Land, Seelow (Dresden-Land, Freital; 1967-1986)
In office 14 July 1967 – 16 November 1989
Preceded by	multi-member district
Succeeded by	Heinz Albrecht

Personal details
- Born: Günther Kleiber; 16 September 1931 Eula, Free State of Saxony, Weimar Republic (now Borna-Eula, Germany)
- Died: 29 March 2013 (aged 81) Berlin, Germany
- Party: Socialist Unity Party (1950–1989)
- Education: University of Rostock; Dresden University of Technology
- Occupation: Politician; Party Functionary; Civil Servant; Electrician
- Awards: Banner of Labor; Order of Karl Marx
- Central institution membership: 1984–1989: Full member, Politburo of the Central Committee; 1971–1984: Candidate member, Politburo of the Central Committee; 1967–1989: Full member, Central Committee; Other offices held: 1988–1989: Member, National Defence Council; 1971–1988: Deputy Chairman, Council of Ministers; 1966–1971: State Secretary for the Coordination and Use of IT, Chairman of the Council of Ministers

Günther Kleiber (16 September 1931, in Eula – 29 March 2013, in Berlin) was a former East German politician. He was a member of the politburo of the Socialist Unity Party of Germany (SED) from 1984 to 1989, and previously served as a minister for machinery, agricultural machinery and vehicle construction from 1973 to 1986. He was also a member of the SED central committee and the People's Chamber from 1967. He was Vice Chairman of the Council of Ministers from 1971 to 1989. From 1986 to 1989, he was the representative of the GDR to COMECON.

Kleiber resigned all his offices on 8 November 1989, the day before the fall of the Berlin Wall. He was expelled from the party on 3 December. An investigation into abuse of power and corruption was suspended in May 1990. After his release from custody, he was unemployed.

In 1997, Kleiber was convicted of manslaughter for his role in ordering border guards to shoot East Germans who were attempting to flee to the West, and sentenced to three years in prison. The verdict was upheld by the Federal Supreme Court in November 1999, and Kleiber reported to a prison in Berlin to begin serving his sentence on 18 January 2000. After a request for clemency, where he expressed his regret for his actions as a member of the East German regime, he was, along with Günter Schabowski, pardoned by Governing Mayor Eberhard Diepgen (CDU) and released from prison on 6 September the same year.
