= Eberhard Aurich =

German politician (born 1946)

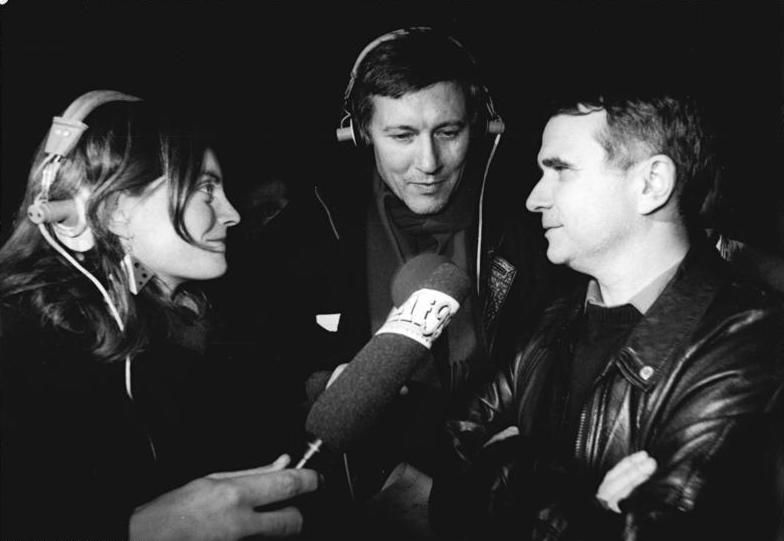
- Aurich (right) in 1989

First Secretary of the Free German Youth
- In office 1 December 1983 – 24 November 1989
- Second Secretary: Volker Voigt
- Preceded by: Egon Krenz
- Succeeded by: Frank Türkowsky

Second Secretary of the Free German Youth
- In office December 1980 – 1 December 1983
- First Secretary: Egon Krenz
- Preceded by: Erich Postler
- Succeeded by: Volker Voigt
Volkskammer
Member of the Volkskammer for Bezirk Halle
In office 16 June 1986 – 29 January 1990
Preceded by	Gerald Götting
Constituency	Bitterfeld, Gräfenhainichen, Wittenberg, №2
In office 25 June 1981 – 16 June 1986
Preceded by	Friedrich Otto
Succeeded by	Friedrich Otto
Constituency	Bitterfeld, Gräfenhainichen, Wittenberg, №4

Personal details
- Born: 10 December 1946 (age 79) Chemnitz, State of Saxony, Soviet occupation zone, Allied-occupied Germany (now Germany)
- Party: Party of Democratic Socialism (1989–1991)
- Other political affiliations: Socialist Unity Party (1967–1989)
- Education: Pädagogische Hochschule Zwickau
- Occupation: Politician
- Awards: Patriotic Order of Merit
- Central institution membership: 1981–1989: Full member, Central Committee; Other offices held: 1986–1990: Member, State Council; 1977–1980: First Secretary, Free German Youth in Bezirk Karl-Marx-Stadt

Eberhard Aurich (born 10 December 1946) is an East German former politician and high-ranking functionary of the Free German Youth (FDJ), the only legal youth movement in East Germany, which he led as First Secretary from 1983 to 1989. He was the last First Secretary before the Peaceful Revolution. Aurich has since distanced himself from East Germany.

== Early life ==
Eberhard Aurich was born on 10 December 1946 in Chemnitz, which at the time was part of the Soviet occupation zone, to a working-class family. As a child, he was active as a child in the Ernst Thälmann Pioneer Organization and became a member of its parent organization, the Free German Youth in 1960. He attended the Extended Secondary School Karl Marx in Karl-Marx-Stadt and completed vocational training with a high school diploma as a concrete specialist. Thereafter, he studied from 1965 to 1969 at the Pedagogical University of Zwickau, graduating as a certified teacher for German and Staatsbürgerkunde, civics education designed to indoctrinate children to support the East German political system and the SED. During his studies, in 1967, he became a member of the ruling Socialist Unity Party.

Aurich never worked as teacher, as he was immediately recruited into the FDJ apparatus.

== Free German Youth career ==
=== Early involvement ===
From 1969 onwards, he worked full-time for the FDJ, initially at the Bezirk Karl-Marx-Stadt FDJ leadership, becoming a Secretary in 1971. From 1972 to 1977, he served as the deputy head of the student department of the FDJ Central Council in Berlin.

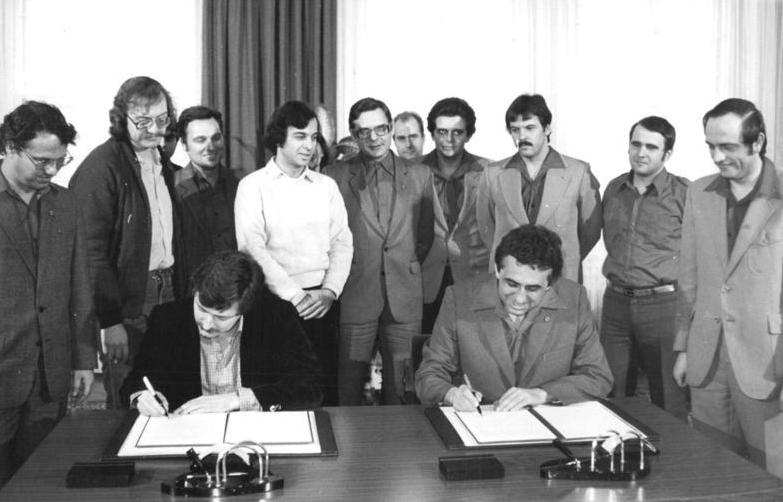
Aurich (second from right) behind FDJ First Secretary in Egon Krenz at a meeting with the Jusos in March 1981

Aurich returned to the Bezirk Karl-Marx-Stadt FDJ in 1977 as First Secretary, also serving as a statutory member of the Bezirk Karl-Marx-Stadt SED Secretariat. In 1979, he became a member of the Bureau of the Central Council, ascending to the position of Second Secretary in December 1980 after incumbent Erich Postler joined the Bezirk Schwerin SED branch as Second Secretary.

Aurich was elected as a full member of the SED's Central Committee in April 1981 (X. Party Congress), serving until its collective resignation in December 1989. He later described the Central Committee's work as rubber-stamping. He additionally became member of the Volkskammer in 1981, nominally representing a constituency in northeastern Bezirk Halle.

=== Leadership roles ===
On 1 December 1983, Aurich rose to the position of the First Secretary of the Central Council of the FDJ, succeeding Egon Krenz, who joined the Politburo and Secretariat of the Central Committee of the SED. Aurich also joined the State Council, East Germany's collective head of state, in 1986.

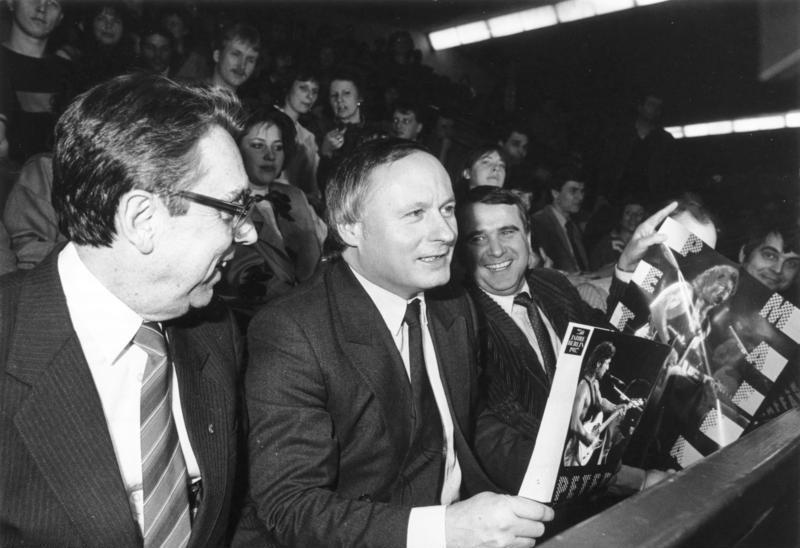
Aurich (right) and Minister-President of the Saarland Oskar Lafontaine (center) visiting a Peter Maffay concert in March 1987

During his leadership, the FDJ became more open towards Western music and culture. The FDJ organized concerts with Western artists such as Bob Dylan and Bruce Springsteen and was more open towards the LGBT community. In a 1988 letter, Aurich himself stated that "I can assure you that the FDJ will continue to give great attention toward the complete equality of homosexual youth and other citizens in its diverse forms of political and ideological work." In January 1989, he and other high-ranking FDJ officials wrote a letter to Egon Krenz, Central Committee Secretary responsible for youth, critical of the SED's media policy.

During his tenure, Aurich met future German Chancellor Olaf Scholz, then deputy chair of the Jusos, twice in the context of disarmament discussions; in January 1984 alongside Egon Krenz and Herbert Häber and at a disarmament rally of the FDJ in Wittenberg in September 1987.

Aurich was awarded the Medal of Merit of the GDR and the Patriotic Order of Merit in 1981 and 1984.

=== Peaceful Revolution ===
During the Peaceful Revolution, on 24 November 1989, Aurich was deposed as the First Secretary and replaced by Bezirk Dresden FDJ branch First Secretary Frank Türkowsky, who held this position until the end of January 1990. The FDJ lost almost all of its members and now only exists as a fringe group.

Aurich resigned from the Volkskammer and the moribund State Council in late January 1990.

== Later life ==
In 1991, Aurich left the Party of Democratic Socialism, which had been created in December 1989, when the reform faction took over the SED. After initially being unemployed, Aurich started working in video production. From 1990 until the end of 2011, Aurich was the managing director of trainmedia GmbH, a publishing house that produces the magazine Wortspiegel and books for children with reading and spelling difficulties.

Aurich has since distanced himself from East Germany. In a 2014 interview with the Berliner Morgenpost, he described East Germany as gleichgeschaltet (totalitarian) and Stalinist. He especially criticized his former superior and predecessor Egon Krenz.

As of 2009, Aurich lives in Berlin and is married for the second time. He volunteers in the Allende district of Berlin for the socially disadvantaged, elderly people, and refugees.
