= 1971 East German general election =

- 14 November 1971

434 out of 500 seats in the Volkskammer
- Turnout: 98.48% (▼0.34pp)
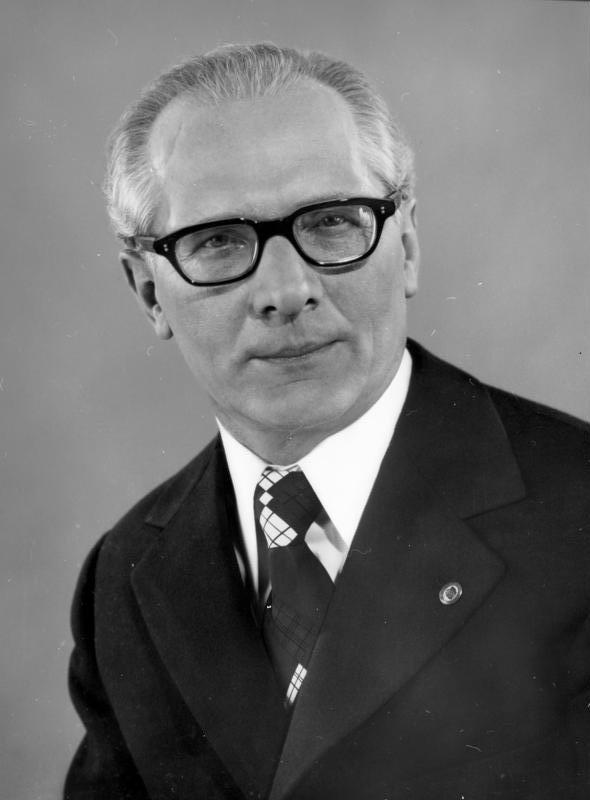
	Majority party
Leader	Erich Honecker
Party	SED
Alliance	National Front
Seats won	127
Seat change	Steady
- Results of the election.
Chairman of the Council of Ministers before election
Willi Stoph
SED
Chairman of the Council of Ministers after election
Willi Stoph
SED

General elections were held in East Germany on 14 November 1971.

434 deputies were elected to the Volkskammer, with all of them being candidates of the single-list National Front. 584 Front candidates were put forward, with 434 being elected. The allocation of seats between member parties of the Front remained unchanged from previous elections.

Like all East German elections before the Peaceful Revolution, this election was neither free nor fair. Voters were only presented with a closed list of candidates (pre-approved by the SED Central Committee Secretariat) put forward by the National Front. The list predetermined an outcome whereby the SED had both the largest faction in the Volkskammer and a majority of its members, as almost all of the Volkskammer members elected for one of the mass organizations were also members of the SED (in this election, all but 4 out of the 165 mass organization Volkskammer members were SED members). While voters could reject the list, they would have to use the polling booth, the use of which was documented by Stasi informants located at every polling site, and had to cross out every name, as "Yes" and "No" boxes were removed after the 1950 election. Abstaining from voting was also seen as oppositional and punished. While legally permissible according to East German election laws, widespread election monitoring was not done out of fear for repression until the 1989 local elections.

== Results ==
Party or alliance		Votes	%	Seats			
Party or alliance		Votes	%	Elected	East Berlin	Total	+/–
National Front	Socialist Unity Party of Germany	11,207,388	99.85	110	17	127	0
National Front	Free German Trade Union Federation	11,207,388	99.85	60	8	68	0
National Front	Christian Democratic Union	11,207,388	99.85	45	7	52	0
National Front	Liberal Democratic Party of Germany	11,207,388	99.85	45	7	52	0
National Front	National Democratic Party of Germany	11,207,388	99.85	45	7	52	0
National Front	Democratic Farmers' Party of Germany	11,207,388	99.85	45	7	52	0
National Front	Free German Youth	11,207,388	99.85	35	5	40	0
National Front	Democratic Women's League of Germany	11,207,388	99.85	30	5	35	0
National Front	Cultural Association of the GDR	11,207,388	99.85	19	3	22	0
Against		16,951	0.15	–	–	–	–
Total		11,224,339	100.00	434	66	500	0
Valid votes		11,224,339	99.97				
Invalid/blank votes		3,196	0.03				
Total votes		11,227,535	100.00				
Registered voters/turnout		11,401,090	98.48				
Source: Inter-Parliamentary Union
