= Wolfgang Herger =

German politician (born 1935)

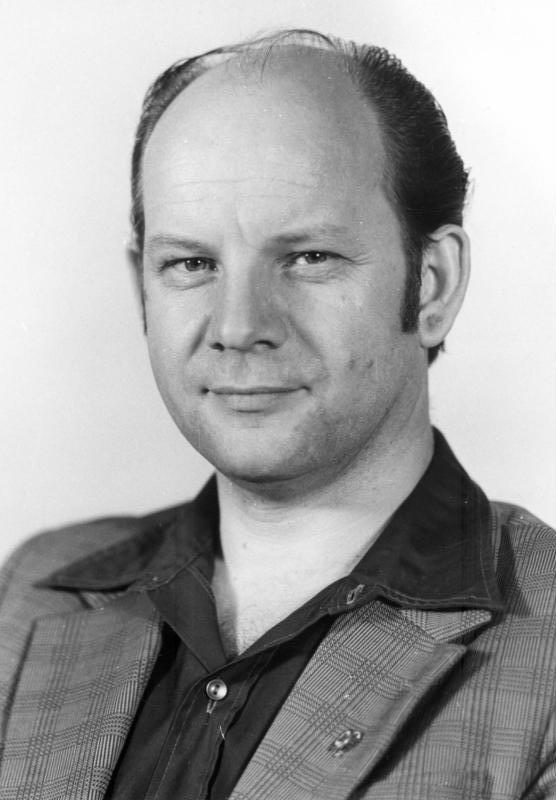
- Herger in 1976

Head of the Department for Security Affairs of the Central Committee
- In office 15 March 1985 – 8 November 1989
- Secretary: Egon Krenz
- Deputy: Fritz Renckwitz; Peter Miethe
- Preceded by: Herbert Scheibe
- Succeeded by: Peter Miethe

Second Secretary of the Free German Youth
- In office May 1971 – June 1976
- First Secretary: Günther Jahn; Egon Krenz
- Preceded by: Dieter Itzerott
- Succeeded by: Erich Postler
Volkskammer
Member of the Volkskammer for Görlitz-Stadt, Görlitz-Land, Zittau
In office 29 November 1971 – 5 April 1990
Preceded by	multi-member district
Succeeded by	Constituency abolished

Central Committee Secretariat responsibilities
- 1989: Security Affairs
- 1989: State and Legal Affairs

Personal details
- Born: Wolfgang Herger; 10 August 1935 (age 91) Rudolstadt, Free State of Thuringia, Nazi Germany
- Party: Socialist Unity Party (1957–1989)
- Education: University of Jena (Dr. phil)
- Occupation: Politician; Party Functionary; Academic
- Awards: Patriotic Order of Merit
- Central institution membership: 1989: Full member, Politburo of the Central Committee; 1976–1989: Full member, Central Committee; Other offices held: 1986–1989: Member, National Defence Council; 1976–1985: Head, Department for Youth of the Central Committee

Wolfgang Herger (born 10 August 1935) is a German former politician and high-ranking functionary of the Free German Youth (FDJ) and the Socialist Unity Party (SED).

A longtime associate of Egon Krenz, in the German Democratic Republic, he served as the longtime head of the powerful Department of Security Affairs at the Central Committee of the SED. During the Wende, he also briefly served in the Politburo of the Central Committee of the SED.

== Life and career ==
=== East Germany ===
Herger pursued a degree in philosophy from 1953 to 1958 at Friedrich Schiller University in Jena. Until 1962, he worked as an assistant at the Institute of Philosophy while also being active in the FDJ and later the SED.

In 1963, he earned his Dr. phil from the University of Jena with a thesis titled "On the Dialectics of Social Necessity and Moral Freedom in Our Era: Investigations into Fundamental Questions of Marxist-Leninist Ethics."

=== Reunified Germany ===
After the Wende, Herger became unemployed and worked as a gatekeeper and employee of various trading companies. In November 1992, Herger briefly worked as a recreational supervisor at a Civilian Service school of the Federal Office for Civilian Service in Kablow-Ziegelei, south of Berlin.

== Political career ==
=== East Germany ===
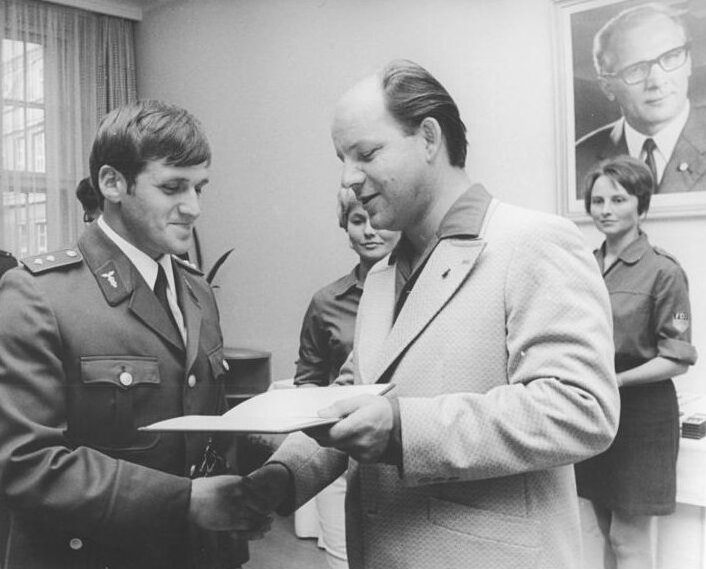
FDJ Second Secretary Herger awarding customs agents with the FDJ's Artur-Becker-Medal in August 1972

Wolfgang Herger became a member of the Free German Youth (FDJ) in 1949 and joined the Socialist Unity Party of Germany (SED) in 1957.

From 1964 to 1976, Herger served as a secretary in the Central Council of the FDJ, from 1971 to 1976 as Second Secretary under Günther Jahn and later Egon Krenz, succeeding Dieter Itzerott, who joined the Bezirk Halle SED leadership.

From 1971 to 1990, he was a member of the Volkskammer. During his time in the Volkskammer, he served various roles, including as a member of the Committee for National Defense (1971-1976), chairman of the Youth Committee (1976-1985), and deputy chairman/chairman of the Committee for National Defense (1987-1990).

Herger was also a member of the Central Committee of the SED from 1976 (IX. Party Congress) to its dissolution in 1989, where he led the Youth Department from 1976 to 1985 and the powerful Department of Security Issues from 1985 to 1989. In both roles, he worked under the supervision of responsible Secretary Egon Krenz. Additionally, he served in the Collegium of the Ministry of National Defence from 1985 to 1989 and the National Defence Council of the GDR from 1986 to 1989.

In recognition of his service, Herger was awarded the Patriotic Order of Merit in 1973.

=== Peaceful Revolution ===
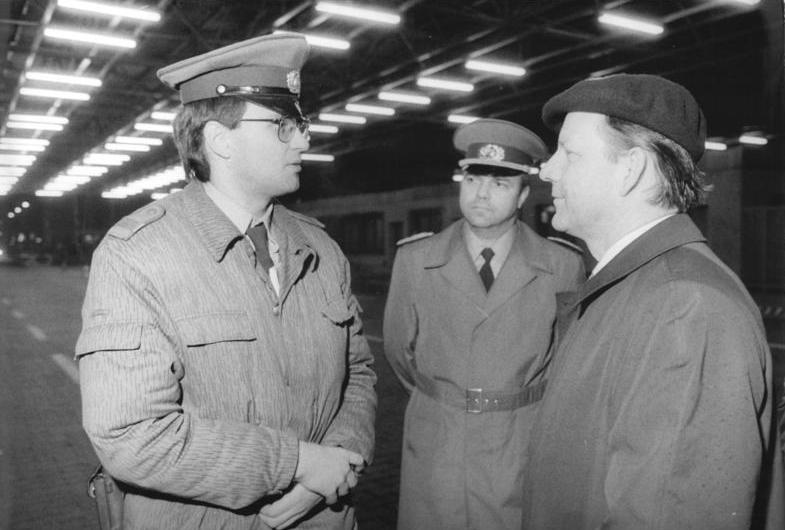
Herger, as National Defense Committee chairman, visiting border guards in Berlin on 20 November 1989

During the Wende, Herger succeeded Krenz, now General Secretary of the SED, as Secretary responsible for Security as well as State and Legal Affairs, also being elected as a full member of the Politburo.

Alongside Krenz, he played a role in ensuring the peaceful transition of events in the autumn of 1989.

=== Reunified Germany ===
In the Mauerschützenprozesse (Berlin Wall shooting trials) on 24 July 1998, Herger was convicted by the Berlin Regional Court of "complicity in manslaughter" (political responsibility for the fatal shootings at the Berlin Wall) and sentenced to 22 months of suspended imprisonment.

Alongside Herger, the former Deputy Minister of Defence Horst Brünner and two other prominent DDR military figures (Manfred Grätz and Heinz Tappert) were also convicted. The court held these four defendants partially responsible for the GDR's fundamental orders regarding "border security," arguing that they had tacitly accepted the deaths of refugees.
