= Bezirk Potsdam =

District of Potsdam Bezirk Potsdam
- District (Bezirk) of East Germany
- 1952–1990
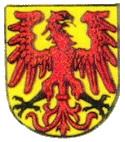
- Flag Coat of arms

- Location of Bezirk Potsdam within the German Democratic Republic
- Capital: Potsdam
- Area
  - 1989: 12,568 km^{2} (4,853 sq mi)
- Population
  - 1989: 1,123,800
- Government
- SED First Secretary
  - 1952–1956: Kurt Seibt
  - 1956–1957: Eduard Götzl (acting)
  - 1957–1964: Kurt Seibt
  - 1964–1976†: Werner Wittig
  - 1976–1989: Günther Jahn
  - 1989–1990: Heinz Vietze
- Chairman of the Council of the Bezirk
  - 1952–1953: Curt Wach
  - 1953–1957: Josef Stadler
  - 1957–1960: Herbert Rutschke
  - 1960–1962: Franz Peplinski
  - 1963–1971: Herbert Puchert
  - 1971–1974: Günter Pappenheim
  - 1974–1977: Werner Eidner
  - 1977–1990: Herbert Tzschoppe
  - 1990: Jochen Wolf (as Regierungsbevollmächtigter)
- History
  - Established: 1952
  - Disestablished: 1990
Preceded by	Succeeded by
Brandenburg (1945–1952); Saxony-Anhalt (1945–1952)	Brandenburg; Saxony-Anhalt
- Today part of: Germany

The Bezirk Potsdam was a district (Bezirk) of East Germany. The administrative seat and the main town was Potsdam.

== History ==
The district was established, with the other 13, on 25 July 1952, substituting the old German states. After 3 October 1990 it was disestablished following German reunification, becoming again part of the state of Brandenburg.

== Geography ==
=== Position ===
The Bezirk Potsdam was the largest Bezirk in the GDR and the only one bordering with West Berlin. In addition, it bordered with East Berlin and the Bezirke of Schwerin, Neubrandenburg, Frankfurt (Oder), Cottbus, Halle and Magdeburg.

=== Subdivision ===
The Bezirk was divided into 15 Kreise: 2 urban districts (Stadtkreise) and 15 rural districts (Landkreise):

- Urban districts : Brandenburg an der Havel; Potsdam.
- Rural districts : Belzig; Brandenburg; Gransee; Jüterbog; Königs Wusterhausen; Kyritz; Luckenwalde; Nauen; Neuruppin; Oranienburg; Potsdam; Pritzwalk; Rathenow; Wittstock; Zossen.
