= 1967 East German general election =

- 2 July 1967

434 out of 500 seats in the Volkskammer
- Turnout: 98.82% (▼0.43pp)
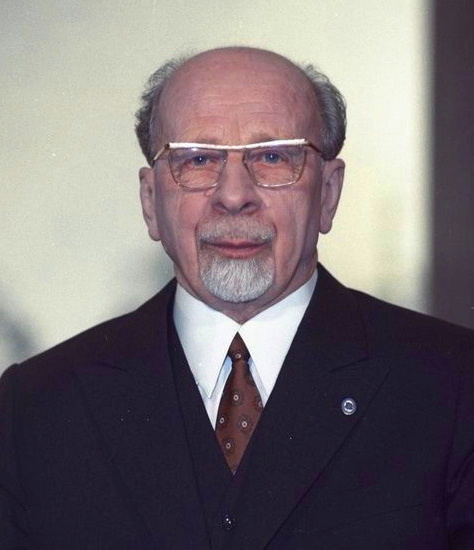
	Majority party
Leader	Walter Ulbricht
Party	SED
Alliance	National Front
Seats won	127
Seat change	Steady
- Results of the election.
Chairman of the Council of Ministers before election
Willi Stoph
SED
Chairman of the Council of Ministers after election
Willi Stoph
SED

General elections were held in East Germany on 2 July 1967. 434 deputies were elected to the Volkskammer, with all of them being candidates of the single-list National Front, dominated by the communist Socialist Unity Party of Germany (SED). 583 Front candidates were put forward, with 434 being elected. The allocation of seats remained unchanged from the 1963 election.

These were the last elections held under the original constitution adopted in 1949. Two months before election day, SED leader Walter Ulbricht had called for a new constitution that reflected the larger goal of building a socialist society. In December 1967 a commission of the newly elected Volkskammer was tasked with recasting the constitution in accordance with the SED's stipulations. A year after the elections, a referendum approved a new constitution promulgated later that year. While the 1949 constitution was a superficially liberal democratic document, the 1968 constitution was a communist document. It defined East Germany as a socialist state under the leadership of the SED, codifying the actual state of affairs that had prevailed in the country since 1949.

Like all East German elections before the Peaceful Revolution, this election was neither free nor fair. Voters were only presented with a closed list of candidates (pre-approved by the SED Central Committee Secretariat) put forward by the National Front. The list predetermined an outcome whereby the SED had both the largest faction in the Volkskammer and a majority of its members, as almost all of the Volkskammer members elected for one of the mass organizations were also members of the SED (in this election, all but 4 out of the 165 mass organization Volkskammer members were SED members). While voters could reject the list, they would have to use the polling booth, the use of which was documented by Stasi informants located at every polling site, and had to cross out every name, as "Yes" and "No" boxes were removed after the 1950 election. Abstaining from voting was also seen as oppositional and punished. While legally permissible according to East German election laws, widespread election monitoring was not done out of fear for repression until the 1989 local elections.

== Results ==
Party or alliance		Votes	%	Seats			
Party or alliance		Votes	%	Elected	East Berlin	Total	+/–
National Front	Socialist Unity Party of Germany	11,197,265	99.93	110	17	127	0
National Front	Free German Trade Union Federation	11,197,265	99.93	60	8	68	0
National Front	Christian Democratic Union	11,197,265	99.93	45	7	52	0
National Front	Liberal Democratic Party of Germany	11,197,265	99.93	45	7	52	0
National Front	National Democratic Party of Germany	11,197,265	99.93	45	7	52	0
National Front	Democratic Farmers' Party of Germany	11,197,265	99.93	45	7	52	0
National Front	Free German Youth	11,197,265	99.93	35	5	40	0
National Front	Democratic Women's League of Germany	11,197,265	99.93	30	5	35	0
National Front	Cultural Association of the GDR	11,197,265	99.93	19	3	22	0
Against		8,005	0.07	–	–	–	–
Total		11,205,270	100.00	434	66	500	0
Valid votes		11,205,270	99.98				
Invalid/blank votes		2,746	0.02				
Total votes		11,208,016	100.00				
Registered voters/turnout		11,341,729	98.82				
Source: IPU
