= Willi Stoph =

German politician (1914–1999)

Army General Willi Stoph
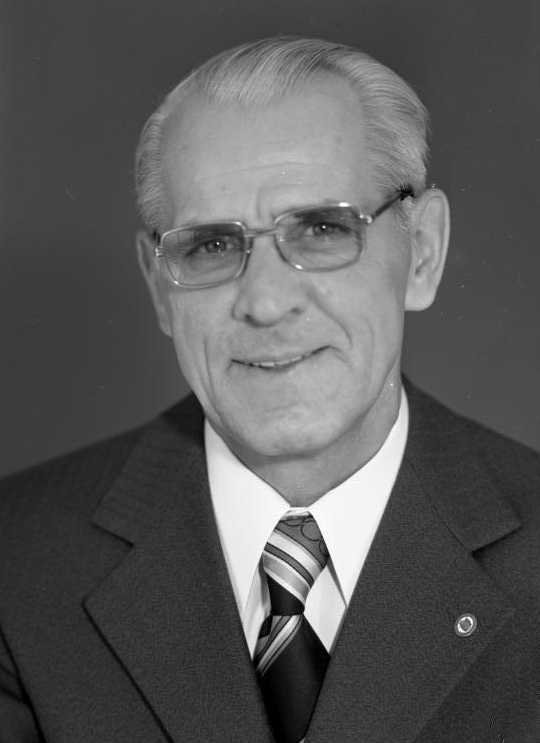
- Stoph in 1976

Chairman of the Council of Ministers
- In office 29 October 1976 – 13 November 1989
- First Deputy: Werner Krolikowski; Alfred Neumann; Günther Kleiber
- Preceded by: Horst Sindermann
- Succeeded by: Hans Modrow
- In office (Note: Acting until 21 September 1964.); 1 November 1960 – 3 October 1973
- First Deputy: Alfred Neumann; Horst Sindermann
- Preceded by: Otto Grotewohl
- Succeeded by: Horst Sindermann

Chairman of the State Council
- In office 3 October 1973 – 29 October 1976
- Preceded by: Friedrich Ebert Jr. (acting)
- Succeeded by: Erich Honecker

Secretary for Economic Policy of the Central Committee Secretariat
- In office 25 July 1950 – 26 July 1953
- First Secretary: Walter Ulbricht
- Preceded by: Walter Ulbricht
- Succeeded by: Gerhart Ziller (Economy)
Grotewohl Council of Ministers
First Deputy Chairman of the Council of Ministers
In office 4 July 1962 – 24 September 1964
Chairman	Otto Grotewohl
Preceded by	Walter Ulbricht (1960)
Succeeded by	Alfred Neumann (1968)
Minister of National Defence
In office 1 March 1956 – 14 July 1960
Chairman of the Council of Ministers	Otto Grotewohl
Preceded by	Position established
Succeeded by	Heinz Hoffmann
Minister of the Interior
In office 6 May 1952 – 1 July 1955
Minister-President	Otto Grotewohl
Preceded by	Karl Steinhoff
Succeeded by	Karl Maron
Volkskammer
Member of the Volkskammer for Dresden-Nord, Dresden-Ost
In office 22 February 1950 – 16 November 1989
Preceded by	Wilhelm Pieck
Succeeded by	Horst Buder

Personal details
- Born: Wilhelm Stoph; 9 July 1914 Schöneberg, Berlin, Kingdom of Prussia, German Empire (now Germany)
- Died: 13 April 1999 (aged 84) Berlin, Germany
- Party: SED (1946–1989)
- Other political affiliations: KPD (1928–1946)
- Occupation: Politician; Engineer; Bricklayer
- Awards: Order of Karl Marx
- Central institution membership: 1953–1989: Full member, Politburo of the Central Committee; 1950–1989: Full member, Central Committee; Other offices held: 1964–1973; 1976–1989: Deputy Chairman, State Council; 1963–1989: Member, State Council; 1960–1989: Member, National Defence Council; 1954–1963: Deputy Chairman, Council of Ministers; 1948–1950: Head, Economic Policy Department of the Central Committee

Wilhelm Stoph (9 July 1914 – 13 April 1999) was a German politician. He served as Chairman of the Council of Ministers of the German Democratic Republic (East Germany) from 1964 to 1973, and again from 1976 until 1989. He also served as chairman of the State Council from 1973 to 1976.

== Early life ==
Stoph was born in Berlin in 1914. His father died the following year in World War I. In 1928, Stoph joined the Young Communist League of Germany (Kommunistischer Jugendverband Deutschlands; KJVD) and in 1931 he joined the Communist Party of Germany. He was active in the party's intelligence service, the Antimilitärischer Apparat, before being conscripted into the Wehrmacht from 1935 to 1937.

Stoph was drafted on February 17, 1940. He was assigned to the 293rd Infantry Division's artillery regiment, That same year, he was promoted to private first class. In 1941, he was transferred from Brittany to the Eastern Front. In 1942, while serving as a corporal, he contracted dysentery and jaundice. In 1943, he became a staff private and fell ill with jaundice again, which is why he was deemed unfit for front-line duty and transferred to a reserve unit in Frankfurt (Oder), where he remained until 1944 due to a diagnosed case of heart failure. In 1944–45, he completed a noncommissioned officer training course lasting several weeks. In February 1945, he became a noncommissioned officer (Unteroffizier). He was awarded the Iron Cross, Second Class.

On April 21, 1945, he deserted and allowed himself to be arrested by Red Army soldiers, who released him in mid-July after a brief period of captivity in the Wriezen and Küstrin camps.

Then, Stoph worked with the Communist-dominated Socialist Unity party and served on the party's executive committee from 1947.

== Career ==
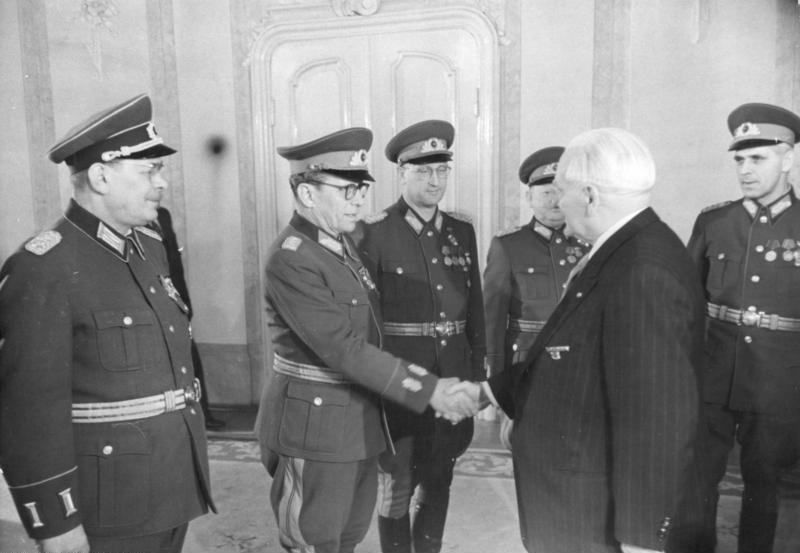
Stoph (far right) in NVA colonel-general uniform, 1957

Following the establishment of the GDR in 1949, Stoph became a member of the Socialist Unity Party's Central Committee and member of the Volkskammer in 1950. He was named to the Politbüro in 1953. He served as Interior Minister from 9 May 1952 to 1 July 1955, and as East Germany's first Defense Minister from 18 January 1956 to 14 July 1960. As defense minister, he was awarded the rank of Armeegeneral.

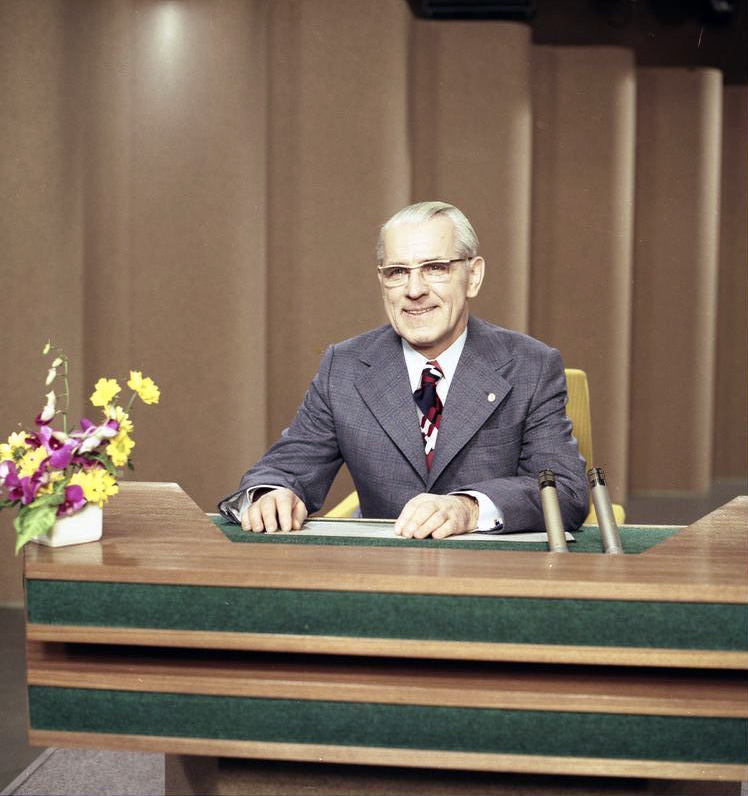
Stoph delivering New Year's Eve address to the East German people, 1974

After having served as first deputy chairman of the Council of Ministers (first Deputy Prime Minister) from 1960 to 1964, he was named Chairman of the Council of Ministers (Ministerrat), or Prime Minister, in 1964 after the death of Otto Grotewohl. De facto, he had been serving as acting chairman of the council since October 1960 due to Grotewohl's poor health. He was initially thought to be the heir apparent to longtime party leader Walter Ulbricht, but his ascendancy was checked by Erich Honecker. After Ulbricht's death in 1973, Stoph became Chairman of the Council of State—a post equivalent in rank to president of the GDR. After the Volkskammer election in october 1976, Honecker re-arranged the state and party leadership structure. Believing that Stoph's successor as prime minister, Horst Sindermann, was too liberal on economic matters, Honecker replaced him with Stoph.

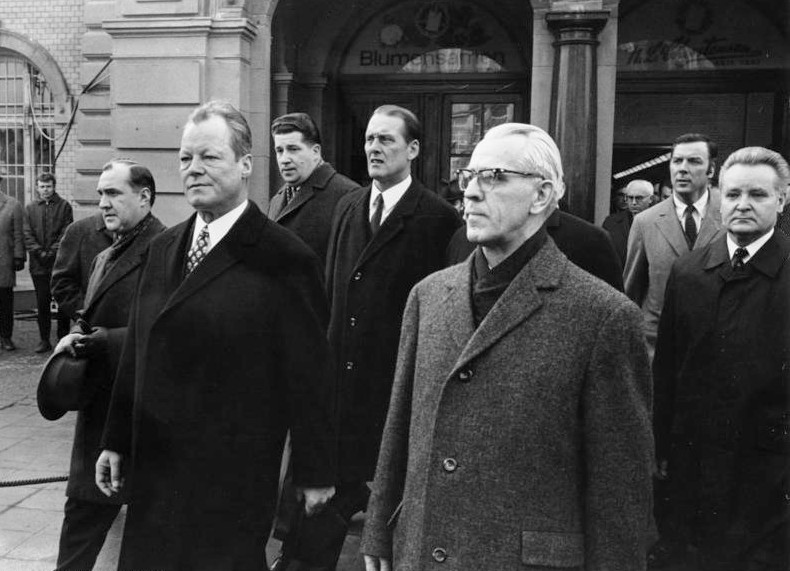
Stoph with West German Chancellor Willy Brandt (on his right), 1970

During his first stint as Prime Minister, Stoph began a series of negotiations with West German Chancellor Willy Brandt in 1970. It marked the first ever meeting between the leaders of East and West Germany.

Stoph was known as a man who could be trusted to carry out the directives of the SED's Politburo; indeed, Honecker tapped him for his second stint in the premiership for this reason. Although he nominally held the highest state post in the GDR, in practice he was outranked by Honecker, who derived most of his power from his post as general secretary of the SED.
For the most part, Stoph was a loyal supporter of Honecker. However, Stoph joined the plot to remove Honecker in October 1989. At the Politburo meeting at which Honecker was voted out, Stoph made the motion to "release" Honecker and replace him with Egon Krenz.
On 9 November 1989, the Berlin Wall fell. Four days later, Stoph and his entire 44-member cabinet resigned in response to public pressure. Stoph was arrested for corruption in December 1989. Despite his role in pushing Honecker out, the SED expelled Stoph on December 3, the same day it expelled Honecker. He was later spared detention on grounds of ill health. On 10 October 1994, the Verwaltungsgericht Berlin decided that his seized savings of 200,000 Deutsche Mark would not be returned to him.

== Death ==
Stoph died in Berlin at the age of 84 on 13 April 1999. He was buried in Wildau.

== Trivia ==
A study published in 2026 suggests that Stoph assumed a false identity during World War II and kept it until his death. He was actually SA Obertruppführer and Wehrmacht Lieutenant Walter Blume, husband of the artist Gwendolyn Liselotte Blume (1914–1983).

== Notes ==
Political offices
Preceded by Karl Steinhoff	Minister of the Interior of the German Democratic Republic; 1952–1955	Succeeded by Karl Maron
Preceded by none (position established)	Minister of National Defense of the German Democratic Republic; 1956–1960	Succeeded by Heinz Hoffmann
Preceded by Otto Grotewohl	Chairman of the Council of Ministers; 1964–1973	Succeeded by Horst Sindermann
Preceded by Walter Ulbricht	Chairman of the State Council of the German Democratic Republic; 1973–1976	Succeeded by Erich Honecker
Preceded by Horst Sindermann	Chairman of the Council of Ministers; 1976–1989	Succeeded by Hans Modrow
