= Free German Youth =

German youth organization

Free German Youth Freie Deutsche Jugend
- Emblem of the Free German Youth

- Flag of the Free German Youth
- Chairman: Kattrin Kammrad
- Founded: March 1946
- Merger of: Young Communist League of Germany; Socialist Youth League of Germany; Socialist Workers Youth
- Headquarters: Karl-Liebknecht-Haus, Berlin
- Membership: ▲2.300.000 (1981)
- Ideology: Communism; Marxism–Leninism; Anti-fascism
- Mother party: Socialist Unity Party of Germany (until 1990) (now independent)
- National affiliation: Democratic Bloc (1946–1950); National Front (1950–1990)
- International affiliation: WFDY
- Newspaper: Fanfare, Junge Welt (Historical)
- Website: www.fdj.de

The Free German Youth (German: Freie Deutsche Jugend; FDJ) is a youth movement in Germany. Formerly, it was the official youth wing of the German Democratic Republic (GDR) and the Socialist Unity Party of Germany.

The organization was meant for young adults, both male and female, between the ages of 14 and 25 and comprised about 75% of the young adult population of former East Germany. In 1981–1982, this meant 2.3 million members. After joining the Thälmann Pioneers, which was for school children between ages 6 to 13, East German youths typically joined the FDJ.

The FDJ aimed to be the "reliable assistant and fighting reserve of the Worker's Party", while Socialist Unity Party of Germany was a member of the National Front and had representatives in the People's Chamber. The political and ideological goal of the FDJ was to influence every aspect of life of young people in the GDR, distribute Marxist–Leninist teachings and promote communist behavior. Membership in the FDJ was nominally voluntary. However, those who did not join lost access to organized holidays, and found it difficult (if not impossible) to be admitted to universities, pursue chosen careers, etc. The majority of youths who refused to join did so for religious reasons.

While the movement was intended to promote the Marxist–Leninist ideology among the young adults of East Germany, it did not concentrate on this to the exclusion of other activities. It arranged thousands of holidays for young adults through its Jugendtourist agency and ran discos and open-air rock concerts. The Festival of Political Songs was an officially sponsored event from 1970 to 1990. West Germany banned the FDJ since 1954, while the FDJ is allowed to operate legally in modern Germany.

== History ==
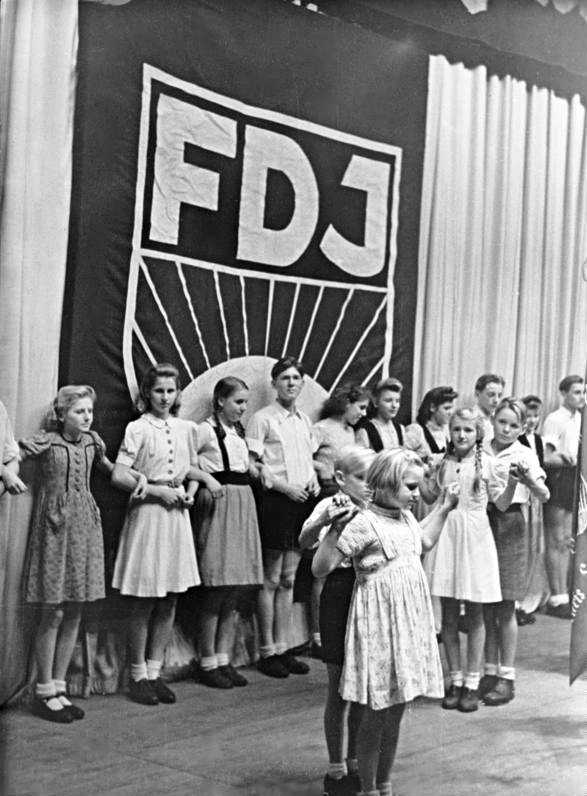
Foundation of the FDJ in Berlin, November 1947

=== Establishment in 1946 in the Soviet Occupation Zone ===
The FDJ had its origins in the months following the end of the Second World War and it was formally founded on 7 March 1946 under the leadership of a young Erich Honecker. Initially developed as an ostensibly non-political national, youth organization, at first the FDJ functioned in all four zones of occupied Germany. Conceived as a "free" and "democratic" united youth organization, the FDJ comprised young antifascists who would cooperate in order to rebuild their homeland. The name of the organisation was inspired by the "Free German Youth" movements formed by young German antifascists in Prague, Paris and London, before the Second World War. Talk of socialism or that the FDJ was to be disproportionately composed of German communists were absent from the FDJ's initial conception.

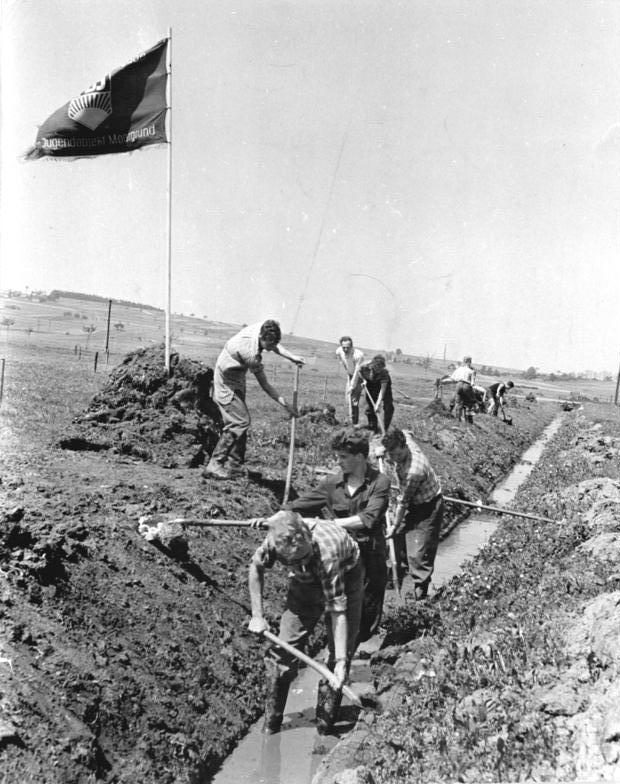
FDJ members digging ditches in May 1959

Open to those between the ages of 14 and 25, the FDJ was crucial to preparing young East Germans for mature adult life along an officially approved route of school, vocational training, and entry into the party and officeholding. The FDJ was responsible for the teaching of socialist theory for the rising generation of young East Germans. The FDJ expected its members to participate in the 'school year', an ideological programme, which aimed to develop a significant group of well-trained cadres suitable for future employment in the SED apparatus. The FDJ were willing to overlook previous allegiance to Nazism and offer opportunities for career and social advancement to young adults in exchange for genuine commitment to the FDJ and its ideals on political, working, educational and leisure rights. Additionally, the FDJ aimed to increase the productivity of young East German workers through sponsored 'youth brigades', during the 1940s.

As the sole official representative of East German youth, the FDJ's main objective was to win over the hearts and minds of young East Germans to socialism, through the Marxist–Leninist ideals of the Socialist Unity Party of Germany (SED). During the 1940s, the FDJ promoted a 'happy youth life' for young East Germans through a sense of unity, freedom, and education. This increasingly made the FDJ attractive to the youths. Organised activities, including sports and dance events, 'social evenings' (Heimabende), concerts, hikes and trips to the cinema, among other activities, aimed to provide leisure for young East Germans without the means to otherwise engage in pastimes. In 1946 and 1947, the responsibility of organising leisure activities predominantly rested with local FDJ groups, existing in towns and villages.

The FDJ also possessed its own publishing house (Verlag Neues Leben) and ran a number of newspapers; a daily newspaper (Junge Welt), a journal for FDJ functionaries (Junge Generation) and a student newspaper (FORUM). Starting in 1952, the FDJ also began publishing two Sorbian language magazines, Chorhoj Měra and Plomjo, for Sorbian members.

=== The FDJ in the GDR ===
The FDJ increasingly developed into an instrument of communist rule and became a member of the 'democratic bloc' in 1950. However, the FDJ's focus of 'happy youth life', which had characterised the 1940s, was increasingly marginalised following Walter Ulbricht's emphasis of the 'accelerated construction of socialism' at the 4th Parliament and a radicalisation of SED policy in July 1952. In turn, a more severe anti-religious agenda, whose aim was to obstruct the Church youths' work, grew within the FDJ, ultimately reaching a high point in mid-April 1953 when the FDJ newspaper Junge Welt reported on details of the 'criminal' activities of the 'illegal' Junge Gemeinden. FDJ gangs were sent to church meetings to heckle those inside and school tribunals interrogated or expelled students who refused to join the FDJ for religious reasons.

As an affiliated organisation of the SED party and government, the FDJ became targets of demonstrators in the lead up to the 1953 Uprising. Growing popular unrest caused members of the FDJ to flee to the West. By 1953, the FDJ was in a state of turmoil with many members and officials joining in with the strikes and demonstrations.

On 25 April 1957, at the 16th session of the FDJ, the central council declared the FDJ as an official 'socialist' youth organisation. The FDJ was the GDR's second most important mass organisation, after the FDGB. The FDJ established a political directive that, in theory, made it an omnipresent force in all aspects of 'youth life' in the GDR. FDJ organisations were found in all areas of East German society, albeit in widely varying numbers, from schools and universities, collective farms, shops and residential areas to the army and the secret police. As the only officially approved youth organisation, the FDJ quickly developed a huge bureaucratic apparatus and acquired generous financial support from state resources.

The FDJ served as a general training ground for functionaries of the SED, the economy and the government. As the sole official representative of GDR youth, the FDJ was vital to the upbringing of young people as socialist personalities. Measures were employed in an attempt to encourage a sense of community spirit of working for a large whole and a better future. According to official prescription, this involved raising them to accept socialist ideals, to acquire a high level of knowledge and vocational skills, to participate actively in official economic and social programmes, to commit themselves to the cause of peace, and to participate in the military training programmes.

In 1952, there was an attempt to militarise the FDJ through the creation of a paramilitary service. On 17 August 1961 the FDJ issued a 'Call to Arms' in a further attempt to encourage young men to join the armed forces. In schools, the Hans-Beimler contests provided a form of military sports education for pupils in the eighth grade. Military education and training received an added impetus by the FDJ in the late 1970s and early 1980s as a result of the breakdown of détente between the superpowers.

The FDJ exercised significant influence over the selection process of universities. Membership and participation within the FDJ were definitive criteria during the allocation of university places. Alongside the Thälmann Pioneers, the FDJ was involved in controlling and disciplining rebellious students through denunciation and spying.

After the construction of the Berlin Wall, the FDJ were involved in obstructing the flow of western media into the GDR. FDJ units were dispatched among local communities, who chanted the names of known listeners to western programmes or stuck posters on their doors. FDJ members also demanded that license holders dismantled TV aerials that pointed westwards, which even led to FDJ members climbing onto the roofs and sawing off offending antennae.

During the SED's reforms on youth policy in the 1960s, Ulbricht attacked the FDJ's unimaginative approach to young people, instead advocating a measure of relaxation of the rigid controls imposed on young people in the FDJ. The focus on providing leisure activities for East German youth returned and the organisation of major cultural events by the FDJ, such as the 'German meeting' (Deutschlandtreffen) increased, ultimately reaching a highpoint at the 1964 festival on the public holiday of Whitsuntide. Thousands of young East and West Germans gathered in East Berlin in a relaxed atmosphere where they danced, listened to jazz and rock music and exchanged views on political and personal matters. In 1965, the FDJ held a musicians' talent competition across the GDR with the final to occur in Berlin although the event ultimately degenerated into a scene of chaos. By the 1970s, well-organised mass parades and mass demonstrations on the occasion of public holidays such as May Day in which members of the FDJ would actively participate, marching in uniform and carrying official banners became a common occurrence.

The FDJ possessed additional measures to mobilise young East German people. The FDJ aimed to make physical culture and sport a form of popular mass activity. The 'Joint Sports Programme' organised by the FDJ, the DTSB, and the FDGB, encouraged not only physical relaxation but also the competitive spirit of participation. The children's "Spartakiads", also organised by the FDJ, alongside the Thälman Pioneers and other mass organisations, were staged in the schools, localities and districts biannually at regional and national level in order to stimulate a high level of performance and help sports functionaries to identify talented youths who could benefit from further development in East German sports schools and training centres.

Another objective of the FDJ was to ensure that individual students experienced holiday camp or carried out some activity during their holidays in a pupils' brigade. Holiday trips for hundreds of thousands of young adults were arranged annually by the FDJ's tourist agency, Jugendtourist. Free-time activities were organised as part of the 'Young Talents' movement and in the tens of thousands of youth clubs and discos. By 1983 about one million of the GDR's 2.2 million pupils attended a holiday camp and 110,000 pupils over the age of fourteen engaged in 'voluntary productive work' in a FDJ's pupils' brigade in their home area.

The SED distanced itself from the FDJ as part of its reformation into the post-communist PDS. Initially, the PDS founded a new youth wing called Arbeitsgemeinschaft Junge GenossInnen in 1990; later, in 1999, it accepted the much larger, West German-founded Left Youth Solid as its youth organization instead.

=== The FDJ in West Germany ===
In October 1947 the 'Berlin-FDJ' was legalised by the Allies. However, the 'West-FDJ' enjoyed little success in a hostile political environment. The FDJ's existence alongside three other youth organisations in the Allied Occupation Zone weakened the presence of the FDJ in Berlin in comparison to the five Länder (states) of the Soviet Occupation Zone, where the FDJ had been established more than eighteen months earlier. In November 1948, only 3 per cent of the city's youth population were FDJ members in comparison to an average of 17 per cent of 14- to 25-year-olds in the East German Länder. The weakened presence of the 'West-FDJ' dashed the SED's hopes for a monopoly control over youth politics in Germany. On 26 June 1951 the 'West-FDJ' was banned, although this ban did not extend to West Berlin on account of its quadripartite division. After a protracted legal battle, the ban came into effect in 1954 when the FDJ's appeal was rejected by the West Germany's constitutional court. The ban appears to have lost its effect after German Reunification, as the FDJ organized demonstrations in Bavaria in 2021.

In 1952, Phillip Müller, a member of the FDJ, was shot by the North Rhine-Westphalia Police during a demonstration in Essen against West German re-armament. Afterwards, large numbers of the FDJ's membership were imprisoned.

== Structure ==
=== Democratic Centralism ===
The FDJ's basic organizational structures were established at the 3rd Parliament in Leipzig in June 1949. Just like the SED and mass organizations in the GDR, the FDJ was grounded on the principle of democratic centralism, a principle first introduced by Lenin to bring order and discipline to the Bolshevik Party during the Russian Revolution. Accordingly, the FDJ was run on a strictly hierarchical and centralized basis. Each organizational unit was directly subordinate to the next-highest organizational body and instructions issued by the central FDJ leadership were binding for all lower-level organizations.

=== Central Council ===
The highest organ of the FDJ was its Parliament, which convened once every three or four years during the 1950s and 1960s. It was only during these conventions that major alterations to the FDJ's statute could be made. In the interim period, the Central Council (ZR) guided the FDJ affairs, assuming a similar role to that of the SED's Central Committee (ZK). ZR members were elected by the Parliament and met in sessions (Tagungen) held three or four times a year. The ZR's tasks included issuing resolutions on all aspects of the FDJ's work, confirming the candidates selected to take up the FDJ's seats in the East German parliament (the Volkskammer or 'People's Chamber'), and overseeing the youth organization's finances.

=== ZR Secretariat ===
The real executive power, however, lay in the hands of the ZR Secretariat, perhaps the FDJ's nearest equivalent to the SED Politburo. Elected by the Central Council, the ZR Secretariat shaped most of the political and organisational direction of the FDJ. It was responsible for cadre selection within the organization and directly instructed the Bezirk (regional) leaderships. Weekly meetings of the secretariat, generally chaired by the FDJ first secretary, were attended by the various ZR secretaries, each of whom responsible for a certain area of FDJ work (such as higher education or international affairs).

The ZR Büro was, in theory, the fourth central leadership organ of the FDJ. It was created at the 3rd Parliament in 1949. It incorporated a wider range of youth representatives, including the leader of the government department for 'youth questions' and representatives of the bloc parties such as the CDU and the LDPD (23). However, it had no real power and was little more than an adjunct to the far more important ZR secretariat.

=== Bezirk and Kreis ===
The sub-structure below the FDJ's highest echelons, consisted of three main bodies organised in strictly hierarchical level: Bezirk (regional) leadership organizations, Kreis (district) leadership organizations, and 'basic units' (Grundeinheiten). At both Bezirk and Kreis level, the leadership structures essentially replicated those in place at the highest level. The 'delegates' conference' (Delegiertenkonferenz) was the lower-level equivalent to the FDJ Parliament, meeting twice every five years at Bezirk level and once every two years in the districts. The Bezirk and Kreis secretariats constituted the real seats of decision-making power at regional and district level respectively. The Kreis secretariat was the key organization linking the last of the full-time functionaries to the 'grass roots' of the youth organization, as represented by the basic unit, which constituted the FDJ's 'nerve centre' in schools, universities, factories, farms, and residential areas. It was responsible for organizing the monthly 'membership meetings' of local FDJ members, where organizational and (less frequently) political issues were discussed.

=== Basic Units ===
In most cases, the basic units were subdivided into the smallest organizational division of all, the 'group' (which might consist, for example, of the FDJ members in a certain class at a school or in a particular work brigade in a factory). In the case of the larger basic units (those with more than 100 members), specialized intermediary bodies—Abteilungsorganisationen ('branch organizations')—were inserted into the organizational hierarchy, serving as a bridge to the FDJ groups below them. At these lower levels of the youth organization, only a small minority of functionaries—such as the first secretaries of some of the larger basic units—were full-time. The vast majority were volunteers drawn, with varying degrees of enthusiasm, from the ranks of 'ordinary' FDJ members. By the early fifties, the FDJ's transition to a 'party youth organization' was—on paper at least—almost complete.

=== Membership ===
After submitting an application, young people, 14 years of age and older, could be accepted into the FDJ. Membership was voluntary, but, nonmembers faced disadvantages when choosing a career or applying to higher education. By the start of 1950, approximately one million had joined the FDJ. By 1985, the FDJ had acquired over 2.3 million members. Once accepted, the members of the FDJ organized several agricultural, economic, cultural, and political initiatives to encourage youth engagement and grow political loyalty in the GDR.

== List of chairmen of the Free German Youth ==
No.	Portrait	Name	Took office	Left office	Time in office	Party	Second Secretary
First Secretary of the Central Council of the Free German Youth Erster Sekretär des Zentralrates der Freien Deutschen Jugend
1	Erich Honecker	Erich Honecker (1912–1994)	7 March 1946	27 May 1955 (reached age limit)	9 years, 81 days	SED	Edith Baumann (1946–1949); Gerhard Heidenreich (1949–1950); Helmut Hartwig (1950–1951); Heinz Lippmann (1952–1953); Werner Felfe (1954–1957)
2	Karl Namokel	Karl Namokel (1927–1988)	27 May 1955	15 May 1959 (not re-elected)	3 years, 353 days	SED	Werner Felfe (1954–1957)
3	Horst Schumann	Horst Schumann (1924–1993)	15 May 1959	13 May 1967 (reached age limit)	7 years, 363 days	SED	Günther Jahn (1966–1967)
4	Günther Jahn	Günther Jahn (1930–2015)	13 May 1967	9 January 1974 (reached age limit)	6 years, 241 days	SED	Dieter Itzerott (1967–1971); Wolfgang Herger (1971–1976)
5	Egon Krenz	Egon Krenz (born 1937)	9 January 1974	1 December 1983 (retired)	9 years, 326 days	SED	Wolfgang Herger (1971–1976); Erich Postler (1976–1980); Eberhard Aurich (1980–1983)
6	Eberhard Aurich	Eberhard Aurich (born 1946)	1 December 1983	24 November 1989 (deposed)	5 years, 358 days	SED	Volker Voigt (1983–1989); Gabriele Klembalski (1989)
7	Frank Türkowsky	Frank Türkowsky (born 1959)	24 November 1989	28 January 1990 (retired)	65 days	SED	Gabriele Klembalski
8	Birgit Schröder	Birgit Schröder (born 1965)	28 January 1990	17 March 1991 (retired)	1 year, 48 days	PDS	

== Demise ==
=== Die Wende ===
At the end of November 1989, the FDJ leadership led by Eberhard Aurich was dismissed by the 13th session of the Central Council. At the end of January 1990, during the XIII Parliament the FDJ gave itself a new statute, defining itself as a "left federation" which stood for an independent GDR as a "socialist alternative on German soil", and no longer as a "helper and combat reserve of the party". The Junge Welt later spoke of a "failure of the organisation" because "the concentrated presence of former full-time officials" prevented a "radical break with the old FDJ". After the Peaceful Revolution in the GDR, from November 1989 to November 1990, the number of members dropped from 2.3 million to 22,000. The FDJ contested the only multiparty election in East Germany in March 1990, as part of the Alternative Jugendliste (Alternative Youth List), an electoral list consisting of four leftwing youth organizations. However the list only gained 14,615 votes (0.12%) and no seats.

=== After unification ===
After German reunification in October 1990, the FDJ quickly lost nearly all of its remaining membership, shrinking in mid-1991 to 7,000 members and in 1994 to a maximum of 300 members, dwindling further in 2003 to about 150. The 7,500 full-time employees of the FDJ were all released by the end of 1991 and the remaining staff handled the FDJ facilities and structures. The assets of the FDJ were placed under the administration of the Treuhandanstalt. Its youth clubs and vacation resorts were redistributed, closed, or sold. The reformed SED, the Party of Democratic Socialism (PDS), founded its own new youth organization, the Arbeitsgemeinschaft Junge GenossInnen, and no longer recognized the FDJ.

However, the FDJ continues to maintain a titular existence to this day. It has reverted to a strict Marxist–Leninist political line, which is exemplified by a positive reading of East German history and the rejection of the federal republic and its annexation of the GDR. The FDJ remains independent, but cooperates with political groups such as the KPD (Ost) and the Arbeiterbund für den Wiederaufbau der KPD (Workers' Union for the Reconstruction of the KPD). Currently, the FDJ has its headquarters in the office section of the Karl-Liebknecht-Haus.

The former newspaper of the FDJ, the Junge Welt, still exists as a small Marxist newspaper, but is now independent from the FDJ. The present newspaper of the FDJ is named the Fanfare, and it is published irregularly.

== See also ==
- History of East Germany
