= Sebastian Walter =

German politician (born 1990)

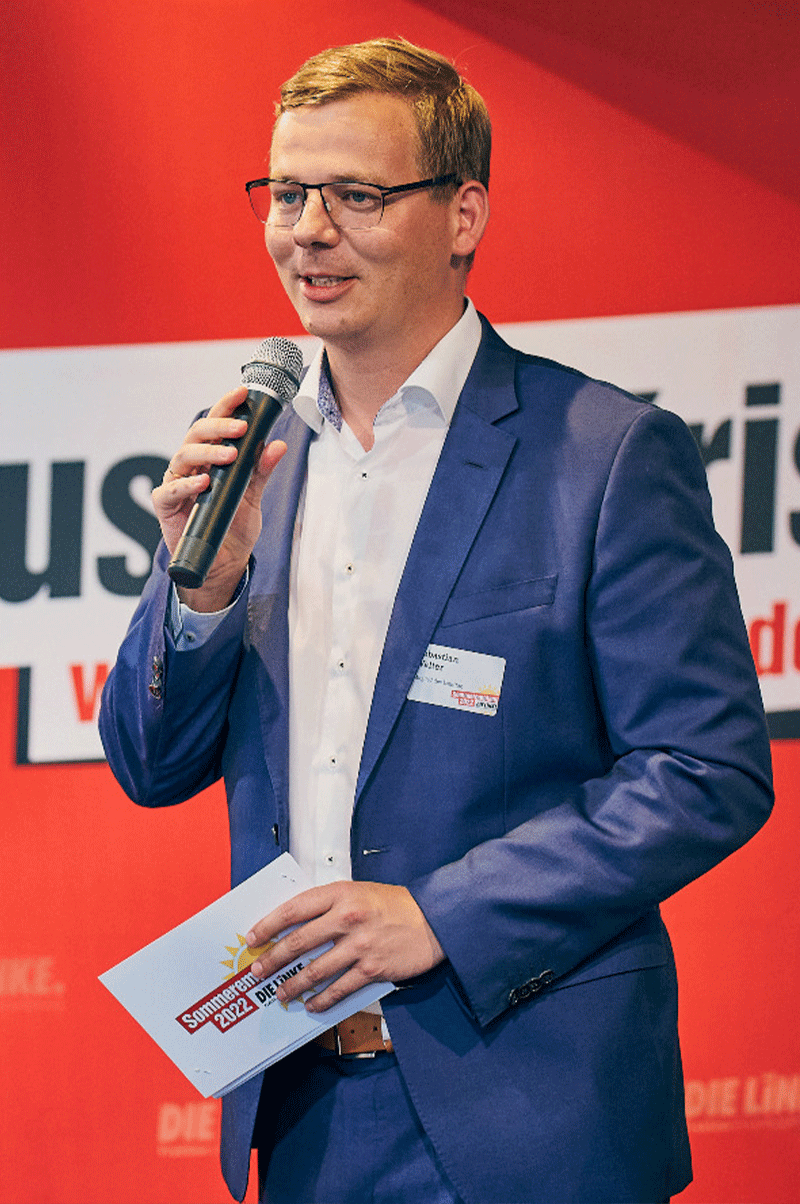
Sebastian Walter (2022)

Sebastian Walter (born 21 April 1990 in Eberswalde-Finow, GDR) is a German politician (Die Linke). He was a member of the Landtag of Brandenburg from 2019 to 2024. In 2022 he was elected chairman of The Left Brandenburg alongside Katharina Slanina.

== Life ==
After completing a bachelor's degree with teaching options in the subjects of history and lifestyle-ethics-religious studies at the University of Potsdam, Sebastian Walter worked as a trade union secretary for the DGB and as its regional manager in East Brandenburg. In a plenary debate on the subject of anti-Semitism, Walter described himself as the "grandson of a perpetrator, a Waffen-SS officer".

== Political career ==
Walter was already involved in the Left Youth as a teenager. From 2012 to 2016 he was deputy chairman of his party in Brandenburg. Since 2017 he has been a member of the district council of the Barnim district. In the 2019 Brandenburg state election he received a mandate in the Brandenburg state parliament. In the current electoral term Walter was parliamentary group leader of the Left Party in the Brandenburg state parliament together with Kathrin Dannenberg until February 2021. Since February 2021 he has been the sole parliamentary group leader. For the parliamentary group, Walter is the spokesman for economic policy, energy policy, digitalization and the labour market.

Since 2022, he has been the state chair of the Left Party in Brandenburg with Katharina Slanina.

On 23 November 2023, Walter called AfD legislator Hans-Christoph Berndt and Andreas Galau "Nazi pigs" during a debate on anti-Semitism in the state parliament.

He was his party's lead candidate in the 2024 Brandenburg state election. He led them to defeat suffering an electoral wipeout losing all their seats.
