= The Left Brandenburg =

- Leader: Katharina Slanina and Sebastian Walter
- Founded: 2007
- Membership (2023): 4,150
- Political position: Left-wing
- National affiliation: Die Linke

Website
- https://kampagne24.dielinke-brandenburg.de/

The Left Brandenburg (German: Die Linke. Brandenburg) is the regional association of the party The Left in the state of Brandenburg. The regional chairmen are Katharina Slanina and Sebastian Walter, who is also the parliamentary group leader in the Landtag of Brandenburg.

== History ==
=== Unification ===
The Brandenburg regional association of the Left Party was formed as part of the nationwide merger of PDS and WASG in 2007. On 8 September of the same year, the regional associations of both parties united at the party conference in Brandenburg an der Havel.

The party was already represented in the state parliament before the 2009 state election through the previous PDS parliamentary group. At that time, it was in opposition to the red-black state government of Matthias Platzeck. After the state election that took place at the same time as the 2009 federal election, it formed a coalition in the state parliament from 2009 to 2019 as a junior partner together with the SPD Brandenburg and co-formed the state government. Since the 2019 state election, the state government has been formed by a Kenya coalition, so the party has been in opposition since then.

Sebastian Walter led the party into the 2024 Brandenburg state election, where it received under 3% of the vote and lost all representation in the Landtag of Brandenburg. However, in the 2025 federal election, the party would receive 10.7% of the vote in Brandenburg.

== Divisions and mergers ==
The state party is divided into 17 district associations, each of which corresponds to the districts and independent cities, with a joint district association in the independent city of Cottbus and in the Spree-Neiße district.

The highest decision-making body is the state party conference, which is elected for a two-year term. According to the statutes, it meets at least once a calendar year. It elects the state executive committee for a two-year term, which leads the party between state party conferences. The state executive committee consists of one or two chairmen, one or more deputies, a state manager and a state treasurer. The members of the extended executive committee are determined by the number of members of the executive board and may not exceed a total of 18 members. There is also a state committee as an organ of the state association with consultative, control and initiative functions vis-à-vis the state executive committee. The state committee consists of a total of 38 members, the majority of whom are sent from the district associations (30 places), the state-wide associations (4 places) and the state executive committee and the youth association (2 places each).

The Left Brandenburg has several intra-party associations. These can be freely formed by the members and are not official branches of the state party. The associations work independently on certain topics or, in the case of the Communist Platform, are a political movement. In 2014, the following state-wide associations exist:

- LAG Antikapitalistische Linke
- LAG basis.linke
- LAG Company & Union
- LAG Movement Left
- LAG Network EL
- Specialist Working Group on Flight and Migration
- LAG Forum Demokratischer Sozialismus
- LAG History
- LAG Basic Income
- LAG Communist Platform
- LAG Local Politics
- LAG LEFT Women
- LAG LEFT Entrepreneurs
- LAG Queer
- LAG Red Reporters
- LAG School and Education
- LAG Self-determined Disability Policy
- LAG Seniors
- LAG SocialHealth
- LAG Environment
- LAG To promote a solidarity economy
- LAG Welcoming Culture

In addition, there is Left Youth Solid Brandenburg, a regional association of the recognized party-affiliated youth association of the Left with around 300 members.

== Former party leaders ==
(Until 2007 for the PDS/Left Party PDS)

Term of office	Name
1990–1991	Heinz Vietze
1991–1993	Lothar Bisky
1993–1995	Helmuth Markov
1995–1999	Wolfgang Thiel
1999–2001	Anita Tack
2001–2005	Ralf Christoffers
2005–2012	Thomas Nord
2012–2014	Stefan Ludwig
2014–2018	Christian Görke
2018–2020	Diana Golze and Anja Mayer
2020–2022	Anja Mayer and Katharina Slanina
Since 2022	Katharina Slanina and Sebastian Walter

== Parliamentary Group ==
(Until 2007 for the PDS-LL/PDS factions)

=== Former chairs of the parliamentary group ===
Term of office	Name
1990–2004	Lothar Bisky
2004–2005	Dagmar Enkelmann
2005–2012	Kerstin Kaiser
2012–2014	Christian Görke
2014–2015	Margitta Mächtig
2015–2019	Ralf Christoffers
2019–2021	Kathrin Dannenberg and Sebastian Walter
Since 2021	Sebastian Walter

=== Previous Vice Presidents of the State Parliament ===
Term of office	Name
2004–2005	Lothar Bisky
2005–2009	Gerlinde Stobrawa
2009–2014	Gerrit Große

=== Members of the Landtag ===
In the 7th Brandenburg State Parliament, the Left Party is represented by a total of 10 MPs, including 5 women and 5 men (since October 2021 with 6 women and 4 men).

==== Group Executive ====
- Sebastian Walter, parliamentary group leader, spokesman for economic policy, energy policy, digitalisation and labour market
- Marlen Block, Deputy Group Leader, Spokesperson for Home Affairs, Legal Affairs and Justice Policy
- Andrea Johlige, Deputy Group Leader, Spokesperson for Local Politics, Migration and Integration Policy and Anti-Fascist Politics
- Thomas Domres, Parliamentary Secretary, Spokesman for Environment, Agriculture, Climate Protection, Media Policy

==== Other parliamentary group members ====
- Andreas Büttner, spokesman for social policy, inclusion policy, religious policy, consumer protection, transport policy, infrastructure and the BER
- Kathrin Dannenberg, parliamentary group leader, spokesperson for education and sports policy, minority policy, children and youth policy
- Bettina Fortunato, spokesperson for women, family, gender equality, senior citizens, European and development policy
- Anke Schwarzenberg (since October 2021, replacing Christian Görke), spokesperson for structural change in Lusatia, rural development, regional planning and spatial planning
- Ronny Kretschmer, spokesman for budget and financial policy as well as health and care policy
- Isabelle Vandre, spokesperson for higher education, science and research policy and cultural policy, urban development, construction, housing and rent policy

==== Former parliamentary group members ====
- Christian Görke (until October 2021, since then a member of the Bundestag), former spokesman for infrastructure, regional planning and spatial planning, urban development, construction and transport policy, European and development policy

== Results of state elections ==
2004 Brandenburg state election results. Die Linke. Brandenburg at its peak in the purple

Results of the state elections
Year	Votes	Seats
1990	13.4%	13
1994	18.7%	18
1999	23.3%	22
2004	28.0%	29
2009	27.2%	26
2014	18.6%	17
2019	10.7%	10
2024	2.98%	0

== Literature ==
- Roland Schirmer: Die Linke in Brandenburg. In: Jakob Lempp (Hrsg.): Parteien in Brandenburg. be.bra wissenschaft verlag, Berlin 2008, ISBN 978-3-937233-48-2, pp. 125–150.
