= Uckermark III/Oberhavel IV =

State electoral district of Germany

10: Uckermark III/Oberhavel IV
- Electoral district for the Landtag of Brandenburg
- Uckermark III/Oberhavel IV in 2024
- District: Oberhavel and Uckermark
- Electorate: 42,164 (2024)
- Major settlements: Fürstenberg/Havel and Zehdenick

Current electoral district
- Created: 1994
- Party: AfD
- Member: Andreas Galau

Uckermark III/Oberhavel IV is an electoral constituency (German: Wahlkreis) represented in the Landtag of Brandenburg. It elects one member via first-past-the-post voting. Under the constituency numbering system, it is designated as constituency 10. It is located in the Oberhavel district.

== Geography ==
The constituency includes the towns of Fürstenberg/Havel and Zehdenick, as well as the communities of Boitzenburger Land , Lychen and Templin.

There were 42,164 eligible voters in 2024.

== Members ==
| Election | Member | Party | % |
|---|---|---|---|
| 2004 | Torsten Krause | PDS | 34.7 |
| 2009 | Torsten Krause | Left | 31.1 |
| 2014 | Henryk Wichmann | CDU | 38.0 |
| 2019 | Sabine Barthel | AfD | 24.0 |
| 2024 | Andreas Galau | AfD | 35.8 |

== Election results ==
=== 2024 election ===
State election (2024): Uckermark III/Oberhavel IV
| Notes: | Blue background denotes the winner of the electorate vote. Pink background denotes a candidate elected from their party list. Yellow background denotes an electorate win by a list member, or other incumbent. A ✓ or ✗ denotes status of any incumbent, win or lose respectively. | | | | | | |
| Party | Candidate | Votes | % | ±% | Party votes | % | ±% |
|---|---|---|---|---|---|---|---|
| AfD | Andreas Galau | 10,355 | 35.8 | ▲11.8 | 9,392 | 32.3 | ▲7.0 |
| SPD | Annemarie Wolff | 8,682 | 30.0 | ▲9.5 | 8,218 | 28.3 | ▲2.2 |
| BSW | | | | | 4,591 | 15.8 | |
| CDU | Peter | 4,620 | 16.0 | ▼2.3 | 3,393 | 11.7 | ▼5.6 |
| BVB/FW | Fielitz | 1,883 | 6.5 | ▲0.3 | 620 | 2.1 | ▼2.0 |
| Left | Zander | 1,257 | 4.3 | ▼7.3 | 802 | 2.8 | ▼8.2 |
| Tierschutzpartei | Röwer | 1,085 | 3.8 | | 602 | 2.1 | ▼0.5 |
| Greens | Telligmann | 768 | 2.7 | ▼11.7 | 918 | 3.2 | ▼6.4 |
| Plus | | | | | 179 | 0.6 | ▼0.8 |
| FDP | Maass | 249 | 0.9 | ▼1.1 | 160 | 2.1 | ▼0.5 |
| DLW | | | | | 93 | 0.3 | |
| Values | | | | | 47 | 0.2 | |
| Third Way | | | | | 37 | 0.1 | |
| DKP | | | | | 10 | 0.0 | |
| Informal votes | | 440 | | | 277 | | |
| Total valid votes | | 28,899 | | | 29,062 | | |
| Turnout | | 29,339 | 69.6 | ▲13.6 | | | |
| AfD hold | Majority | 1,673 | 5.8 | ▲2.4 | | | |

=== 2019 election ===
State election (2019): Uckermack III/Oberhavel IV
| Notes: | Blue background denotes the winner of the electorate vote. Pink background denotes a candidate elected from their party list. Yellow background denotes an electorate win by a list member, or other incumbent. A ✓ or ✗ denotes status of any incumbent, win or lose respectively. | | | | | | |
| Party | Candidate | Votes | % | ±% | Party votes | % | ±% |
|---|---|---|---|---|---|---|---|
| AfD | Sabine Barthel | 5,726 | 24.0 | ▲16.3 | 6,034 | 25.3 | ▲15.1 |
| SPD | Karsten Peter Schröder | 4,907 | 20.6 | ▼7.0 | 6,230 | 26.1 | ▼7.0 |
| CDU | Annett Polle | 4,357 | 18.3 | ▼19.7 | 4,124 | 17.3 | ▼9.5 |
| Greens | Carla Kniestedt | 3,414 | 14.3 | ▲10.4 | 2,287 | 9.6 | ▲5.1 |
| Left | Andreas Büttner | 2,780 | 11.7 | ▼5.2 | 2,621 | 11.0 | ▼7.8 |
| BVB/FW | Harald Engler | 1,494 | 6.3 | ▲4.4 | 998 | 4.2 | ▲2.9 |
| Tierschutzpartei | | | | | 605 | 2.5 | |
| FDP | Stephan Freiherr von Hundelshausen | 458 | 1.9 | ▲0.3 | 591 | 2.5 | ▲1.1 |
| ÖDP | Dr. Dirk Lorenzen | 350 | 1.5 | | 201 | 0.8 | |
| Independent | Silvio Herbig | 320 | 1.3 | | | | |
| Pirates | | | | | 146 | 0.6 | ▼0.7 |
| German Conservative | Uwe Kozian | 40 | 0.2 | | | | |
| V-Partei3 | | | | | 36 | 0.2 | |
| Informal votes | | 360 | | | 333 | | |
| Total valid votes | | 23,846 | | | 23,873 | | |
| Turnout | | 24,206 | 56.0 | ▲12.8 | | | |
| AfD gain from CDU | Majority | 819 | 3.4 | | | | |

=== 2014 election ===
State election (2014): Uckermark III/Oberhavel IV
| Notes: | Blue background denotes the winner of the electorate vote. Pink background denotes a candidate elected from their party list. Yellow background denotes an electorate win by a list member, or other incumbent. A ✓ or ✗ denotes status of any incumbent, win or lose respectively. | | | | | | |
| Party | Candidate | Votes | % | ±% | Party votes | % | ±% |
|---|---|---|---|---|---|---|---|
| CDU | Henryk Wichmann | 7,198 | 38.0 | ▲10.5 | 5,086 | 26.8 | ▲4.8 |
| SPD | Lothar Kliesch | 5,230 | 27.6 | ▼2.0 | 6,277 | 33.1 | ▲0.8 |
| Left | Isabelle Vandre | 3,211 | 16.9 | ▼14.2 | 3,555 | 18.8 | ▼10.4 |
| AfD | Jan-Ulrich Weiß | 1,454 | 7.7 | | 1,932 | 10.2 | |
| Greens | Dr. Jan Bartholdy | 733 | 3.9 | ▼0.4 | 850 | 4.5 | ▲0.6 |
| NPD | Detlef Appel | 459 | 2.4 | | 448 | 2.4 | ▼0.4 |
| BVB/FW | Lutz Pape | 359 | 1.9 | ▼0.4 | 242 | 1.3 | ▲0.1 |
| FDP | Andreas Büttner | 308 | 1.6 | ▼3.7 | 271 | 1.4 | ▼4.7 |
| Pirates | | | | | 242 | 1.3 | |
| REP | | | | | 23 | 0.1 | ▼0.1 |
| DKP | | | | | 17 | 0.1 | ▼0.1 |
| Informal votes | | 287 | | | 296 | | |
| Total valid votes | | 18,952 | | | 18,943 | | |
| Turnout | | 19,239 | 43.2 | ▼19.2 | | | |
| CDU gain from Left | Majority | 1,968 | 10.4 | | | | |

=== 2009 election ===
State election (2009): Uckermark III/Oberhavel IV
| Notes: | Blue background denotes the winner of the electorate vote. Pink background denotes a candidate elected from their party list. Yellow background denotes an electorate win by a list member, or other incumbent. A ✓ or ✗ denotes status of any incumbent, win or lose respectively. | | | | | | |
| Party | Candidate | Votes | % | ±% | Party votes | % | ±% |
|---|---|---|---|---|---|---|---|
| Left | ✓ Torsten Krause | 8,639 | 31.1 | ▼3.6 | 8,217 | 29.2 | ▼2.6 |
| SPD | Lothar Kliesch | 8,236 | 29.6 | ▼0.9 | 9,097 | 32.3 | ▲1.5 |
| CDU | Henryk Wichmann | 7,656 | 27.5 | ▲7.0 | 6,198 | 22.0 | ▲3.5 |
| FDP | Johannes Pogoda | 1,478 | 5.3 | ▲0.6 | 1,728 | 6.1 | ▲3.2 |
| Greens | Regine Kik | 1,183 | 4.3 | ▲1.4 | 1,105 | 3.9 | ▲1.3 |
| NPD | | | | | 794 | 2.8 | |
| BVB/FW | Olaf Discher | 628 | 2.3 | | 341 | 1.2 | |
| DVU | | | | | 280 | 1.0 | ▼5.8 |
| 50Plus | | | | | 126 | 0.4 | ▼0.6 |
| RRP | | | | | 123 | 0.4 | |
| Die-Volksinitiative | | | | | 60 | 0.2 | |
| REP | | | | | 55 | 0.2 | |
| DKP | | | | | 48 | 0.2 | ▲0.1 |
| Informal votes | | 1,178 | | | 826 | | |
| Total valid votes | | 27,820 | | | 28,172 | | |
| Turnout | | 28,998 | 62.4 | ▲11.8 | | | |
| Left hold | Majority | 403 | 1.5 | ▼2.7 | | | |

=== 2004 election ===
State election (2004): Uckermark III / Oberhavel IV
| Notes: | Blue background denotes the winner of the electorate vote. Pink background denotes a candidate elected from their party list. Yellow background denotes an electorate win by a list member, or other incumbent. A ✓ or ✗ denotes status of any incumbent, win or lose respectively. | | | | | | |
| Party | Candidate | Votes | % | ±% | Party votes | % | ±% |
|---|---|---|---|---|---|---|---|
| PDS | Torsten Krause | 8,232 | 34.73 | | 7,606 | 31.80 | |
| SPD | Lothar Kliesch | 7,239 | 30.54 | | 7,357 | 30.76 | |
| CDU | Ingo Mader | 4,853 | 20.47 | | 4,427 | 18.51 | |
| DVU | | | | | 1,635 | 6.84 | |
| FDP | Eberhardt Feige | 1,111 | 4.69 | | 691 | 2.89 | |
| Familie | | | | | 635 | 2.65 | |
| AfW (Free Voters) | Karin Kaden | 1,040 | 4.39 | | 216 | 0.90 | |
| Greens | Eckhard Gorontzi | 687 | 2.90 | | 626 | 2.62 | |
| 50Plus | | | | | 237 | 0.99 | |
| Gray Panthers | | | | | 126 | 0.53 | |
| Schill | Karl-Heinz Eberwein | 543 | 2.29 | | 120 | 0.50 | |
| BRB | | | | | 96 | 0.40 | |
| Yes Brandenburg | | | | | 63 | 0.26 | |
| AUB-Brandenburg | | | | | 52 | 0.22 | |
| DKP | | | | | 31 | 0.13 | |
| Informal votes | | 715 | | | 502 | | |
| Total valid votes | | 23,705 | | | 23,918 | | |
| Turnout | | 24,420 | 50.64 | | | | |
| PDS win new seat | Majority | 993 | 4.19 | | | | |

== See also ==
- Politics of Brandenburg
- Landtag of Brandenburg
