= Isabelle Vandre =

German politician (born 1989)

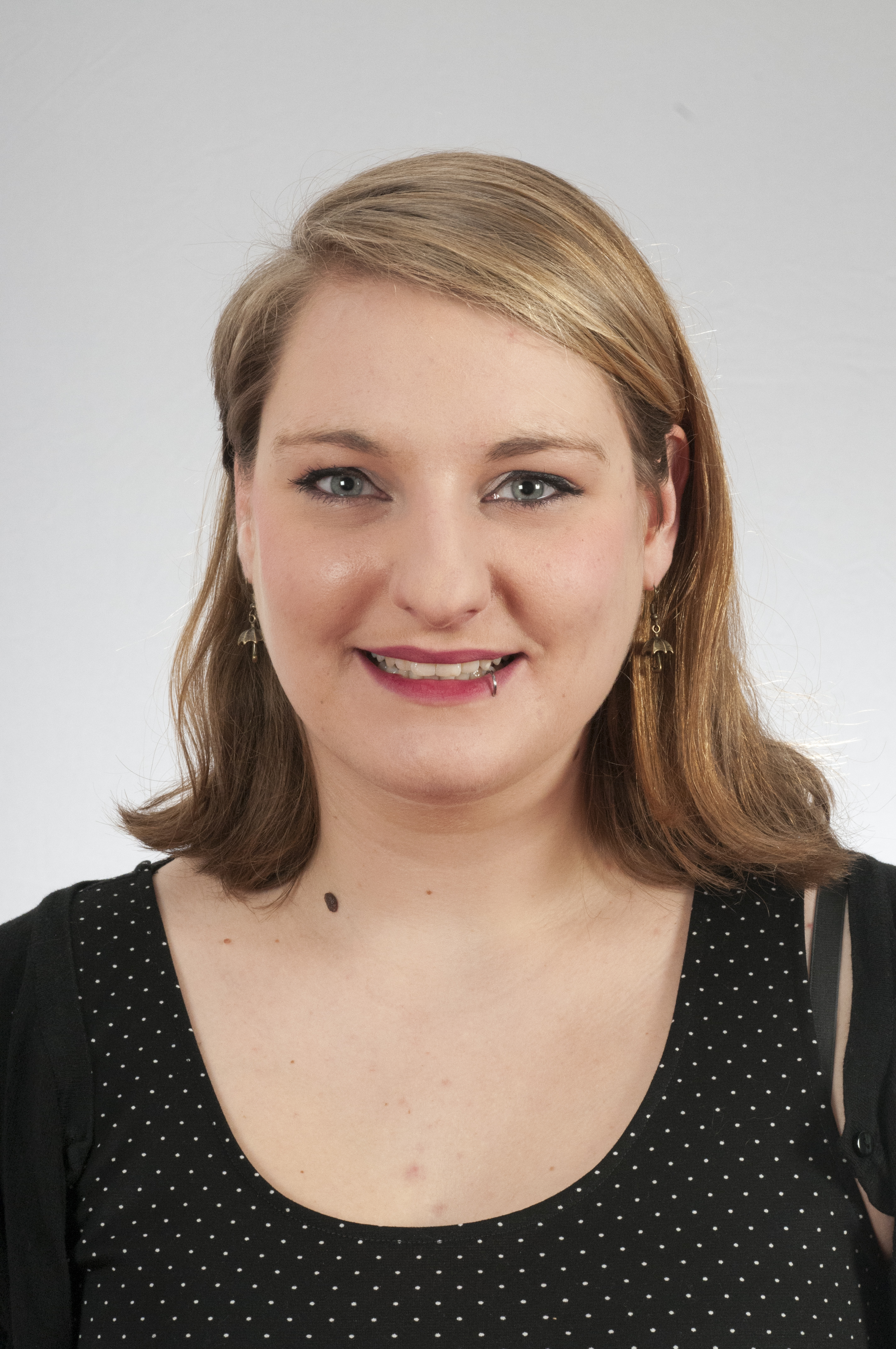
- Isabelle Vandre in 2016

Member of the Bundestag from Brandenburg
- Incumbent
- Assumed office 2025

Member of the Landtag of Brandenburg
- In office 2014–2024

Personal details
- Born: 27 July 1989 (age 37) Eberswalde, East Germany
- Party: Die Linke
- Education: Free University of Berlin

Isabelle Vandre (born 27 July 1989) is a German politician from Die Linke. She was a member of the Landtag of Brandenburg from 2014 to 2024 and was elected to the 21st Bundestag in the 2025 German federal election via the Brandenburg state list.

== Life ==
Isabelle Vandre graduated from high school in 2009. She then studied political science at the Free University of Berlin, where she received her bachelor's degree in 2018. During her studies, she was a member of the Free University's student parliament from 2011 to 2012 and a member of the Department of Political and Social Sciences from 2011 to 2013.

Vandre has been a board member of the SV Babelsberg 03 sports club since 2019. She is also a member of the Education and Science Workers' Union, the Berlin Brandenburg Education Partisans, the Education Institute for Politics and Culture, the Rote Hilfe e.V., the Association of Democratic Scientists, the Women's Summer Academy and the Association of Persecutees of the Nazi Regime – Federation of Antifascists.

== Political career ==
=== Party politics ===
She is a member of the Left Youth Solid and has been a member of the Left Party since 2011. In the Brandenburg state association of Linksjugend solid, she was a member of the state spokesperson's council. Vandre was a member of the district executive committee of the Uckermark district association of the Left Party from 2014 to 2019 and deputy state chairwoman of The Left Party Brandenburg from 2018 to 2020.

=== Local politics ===
Vandre has been a member of the Potsdam Potsdam City Council since 2019, where she is the parliamentary group leader of the Left Party, as well as a member of the Main Committee and the Committee on Health, Social Affairs, Housing and Inclusion.

=== State politics ===
In the 2014 Brandenburg state election, she won a mandate via her party's state list. She was a member of the Committee for Science, Research and Culture, as well as spokesperson for higher education, science and research policy for her parliamentary group. Since 2015, she has also been a member of the parliamentary group's executive committee. She was a deputy member of the Brandenburg NSU investigative committee for her parliamentary group. She campaigned against the tightening of Brandenburg's police law and voted against the reform, despite the majority of her parliamentary group in the state parliament. In the 2024 Brandenburg state election, The Left Party were wiped out losing all their seats. Vandre thus left the state parliament.

=== Federal politics ===
Vandre ran as a direct candidate in the 2025 German federal election in the Potsdam – Potsdam-Mittelmark II – Teltow-Fläming II constituency. She received 13.8 percent of the first votes. She nevertheless entered the Bundestag via the Brandenburg state list. Since the reconstitution of the Left Party parliamentary fraktion in the Bundestag on February 25, 2025, she has been a member of it.
