= Parchim =

Town in Mecklenburg-Vorpommern, Germany

- Town
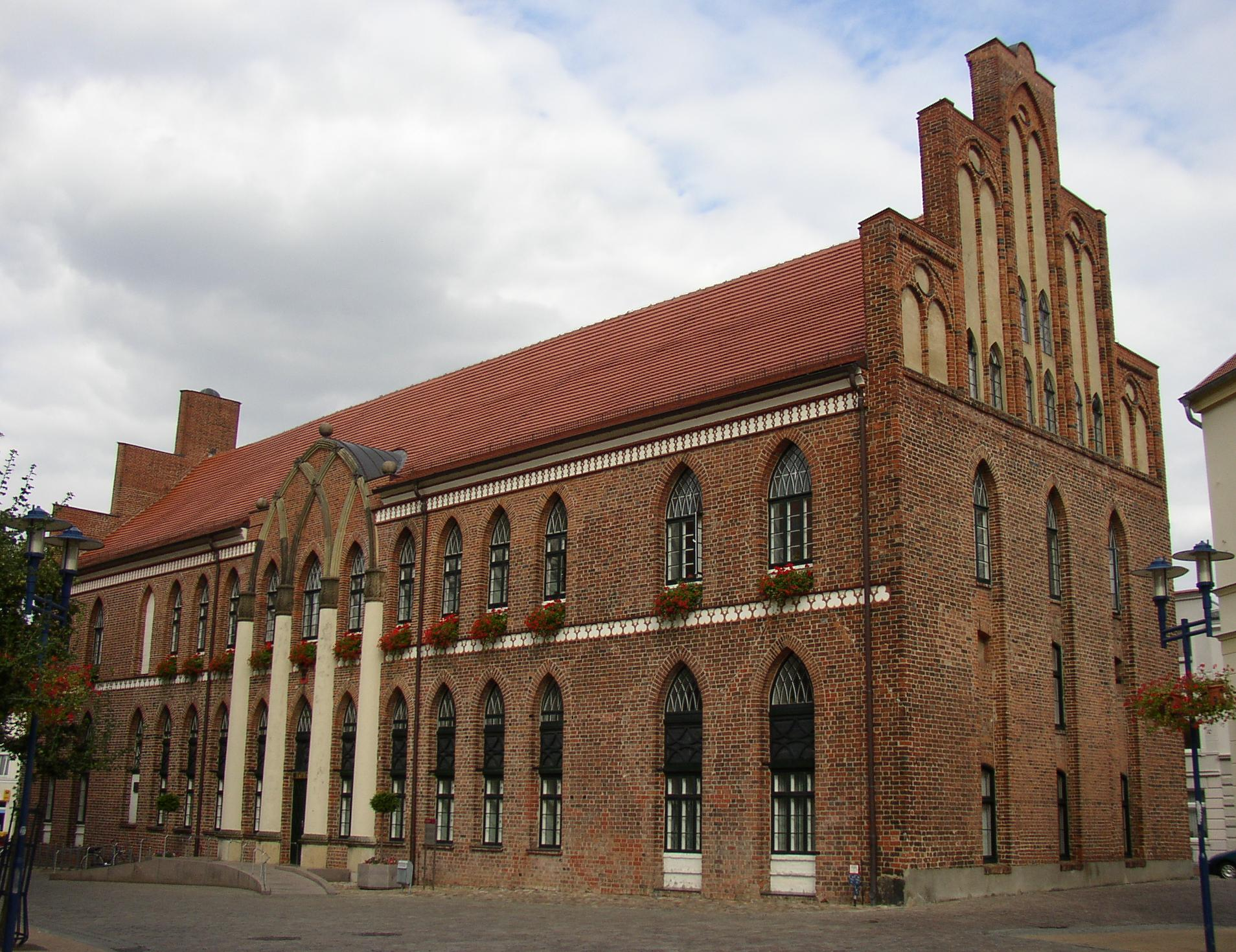
- Town hall

- Coat of arms

- Location of Parchim within Ludwigslust-Parchim district
- Interactive map of Parchim
- Location within Germany Location within Mecklenburg-Vorpommern
- Coordinates: 53°25′N 11°50′E
- Country: Germany
- State: Mecklenburg-Vorpommern
- District: Ludwigslust-Parchim

Government
  - Mayor: Dirk Flörke (CDU)

Area
  - Total: 124.82 km^{2} (48.19 sq mi)
- Elevation: 50 m (160 ft)

Population (2025-12-31)
  - Total: 17,825
  - Density: 142.81/km^{2} (369.86/sq mi)
- Time zone: UTC+01:00 (CET)
  - Summer (DST): UTC+02:00 (CEST)
- Postal codes: 19370
- Dialling codes: 03871
- Vehicle registration: PCH
- Website: www.parchim.de

Parchim (German: [ˈpaʁçɪm]; Mecklenburgisch-Vorpommersch: Parchen) is a town in Mecklenburg-Vorpommern, Germany. It is the capital of the Ludwigslust-Parchim district. It was the birthplace of Helmuth von Moltke the Elder, to whom a monument was erected in 1876.

Founded about 1210, it was the seat of the short-lived Lordship of Parchim-Richenberg, a partition of the Duchy of Mecklenburg, from 1226 until 1248 when the lord relocated to Richenberg. Parchim was absorbed into the Lordship of Werle in 1255. In 1277 Werle was partitioned and Parchim became the seat of Werle-Parchim until it was reunited with Werle-Güstrow in 1307. One branch of the family of the duke of Mecklenburg resided in Parchim during part of the 14th century. It became a prosperous industrial town during the 16th century, but this prosperity was destroyed by the Thirty Years' War.

== Gallery ==
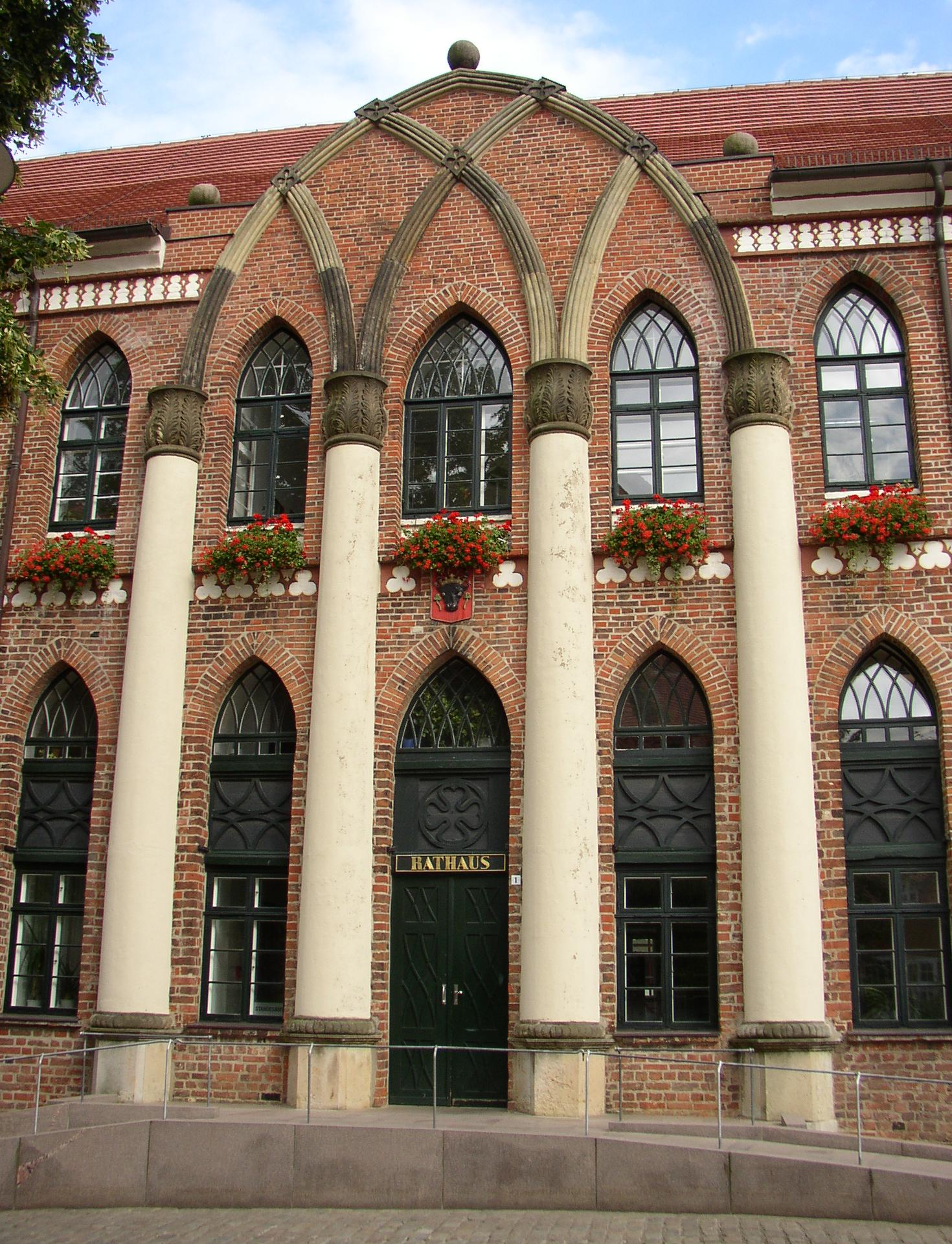
Town Hall

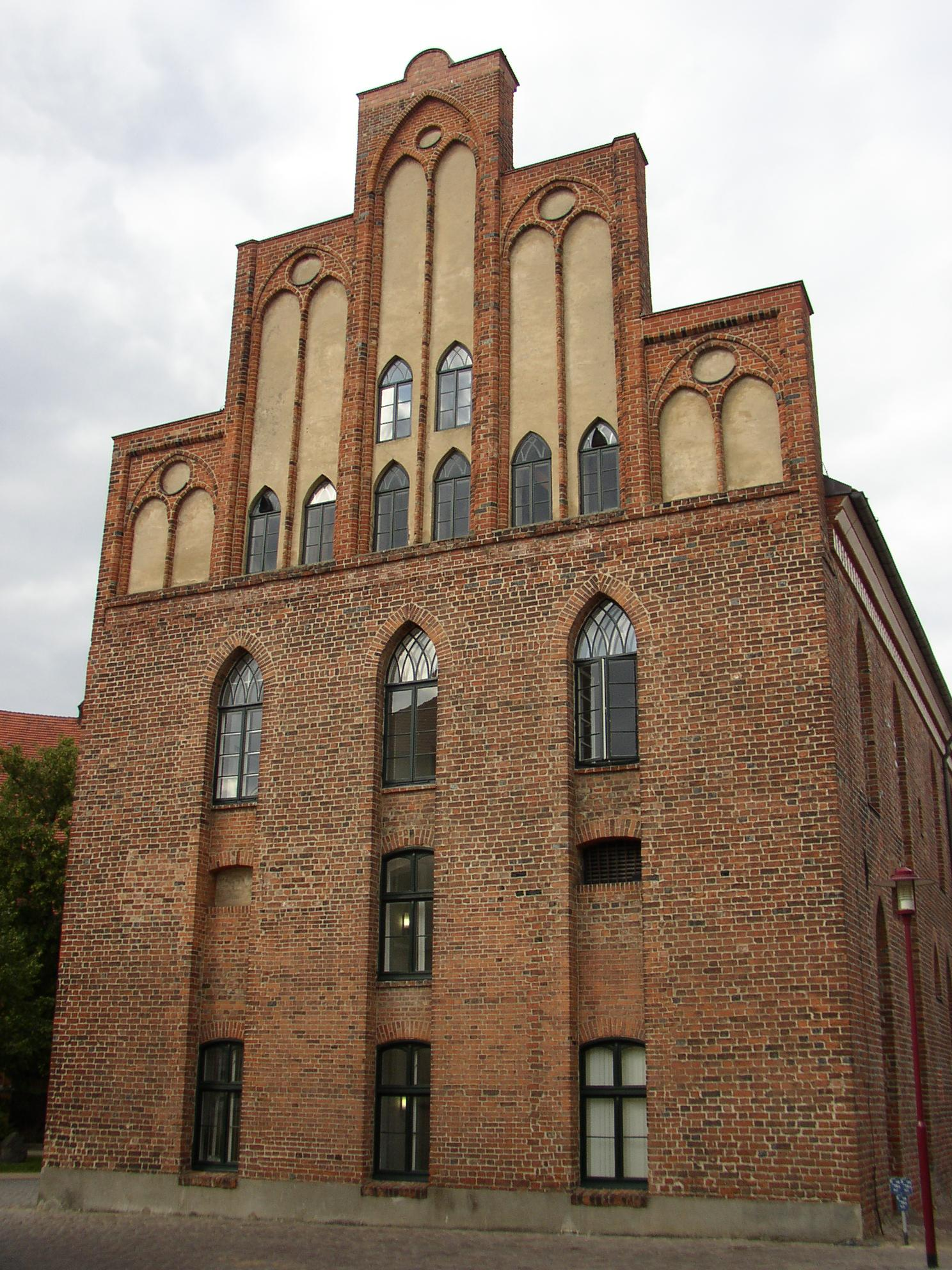
Town Hall

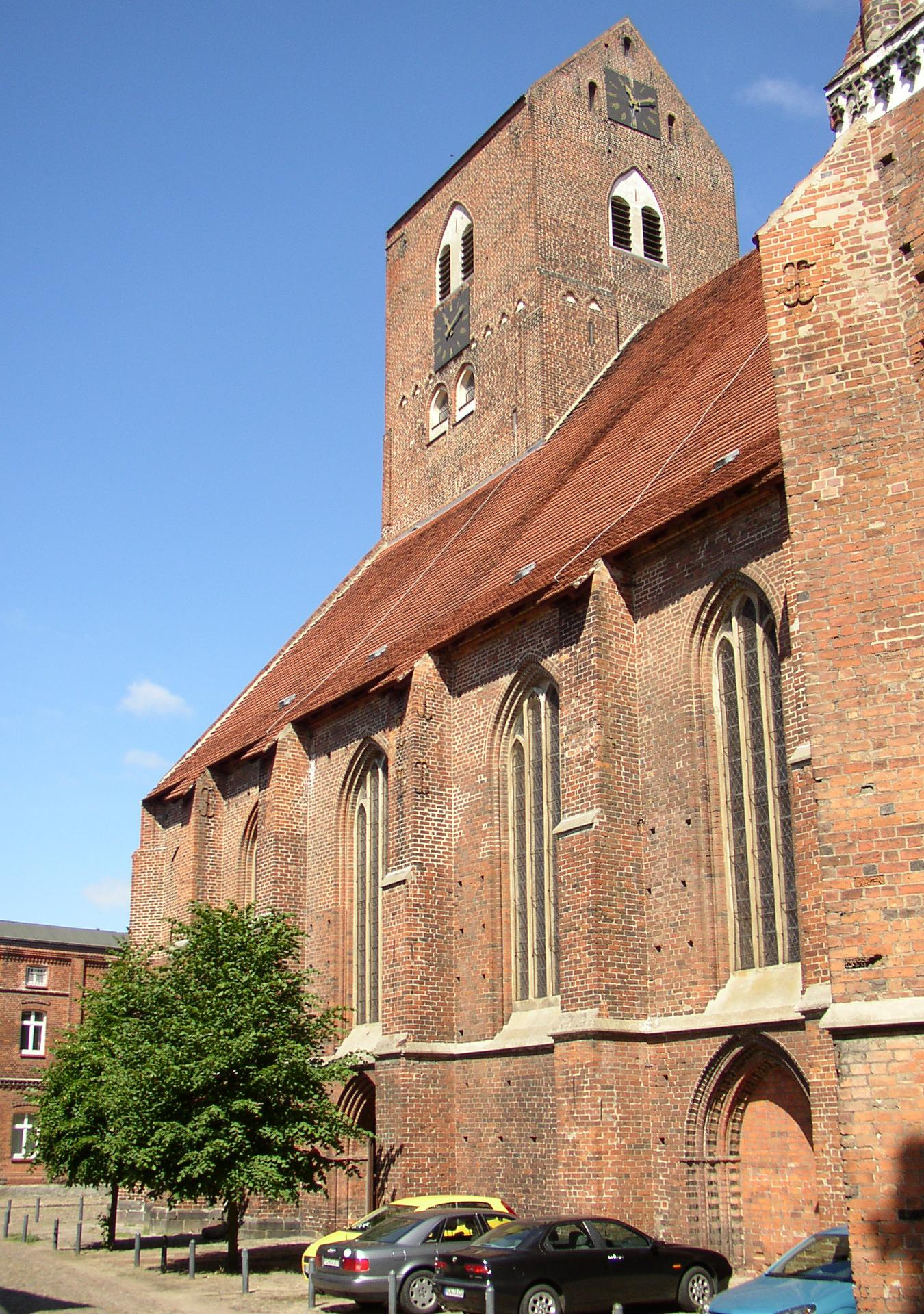
Saint George's Church

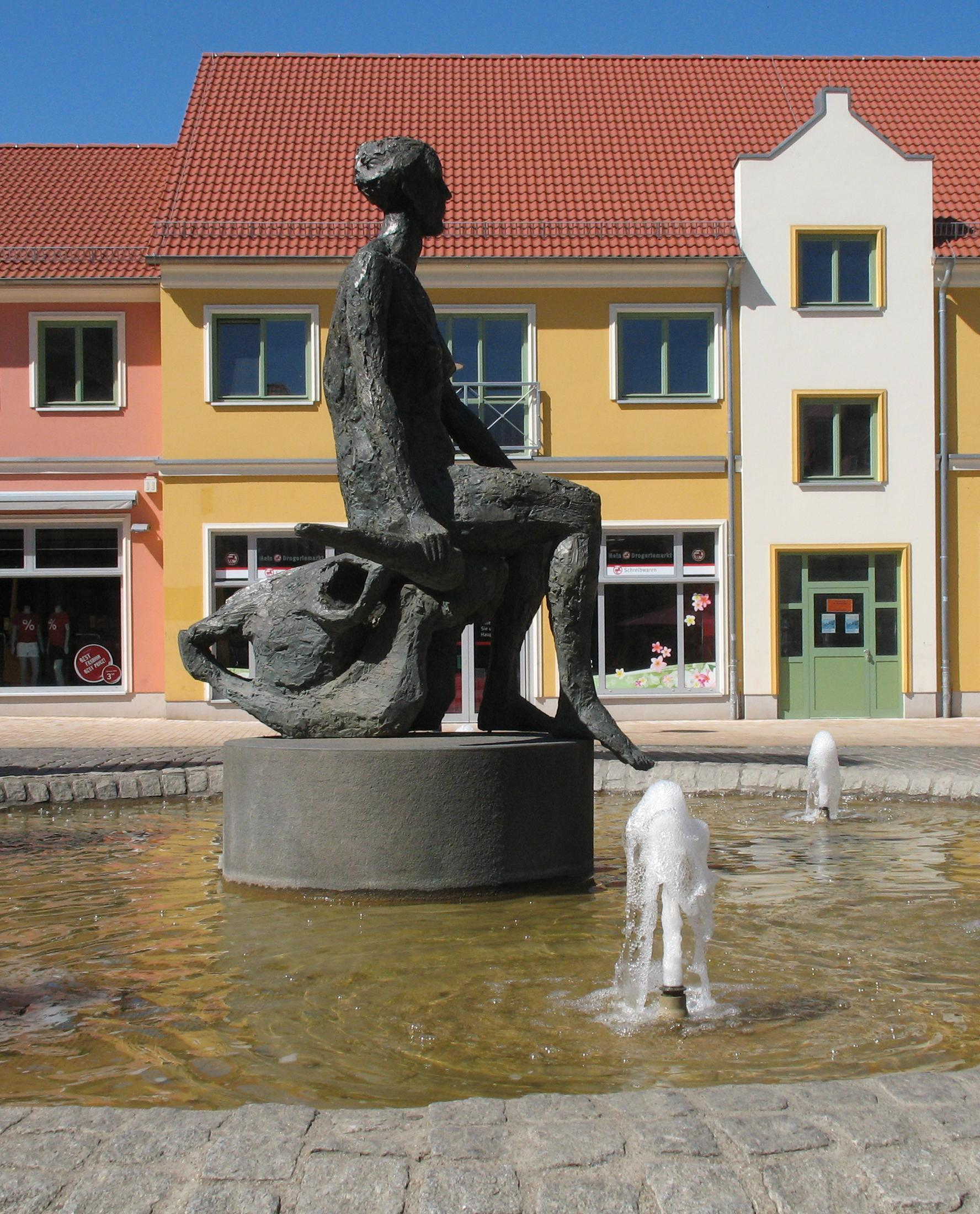
Fountain

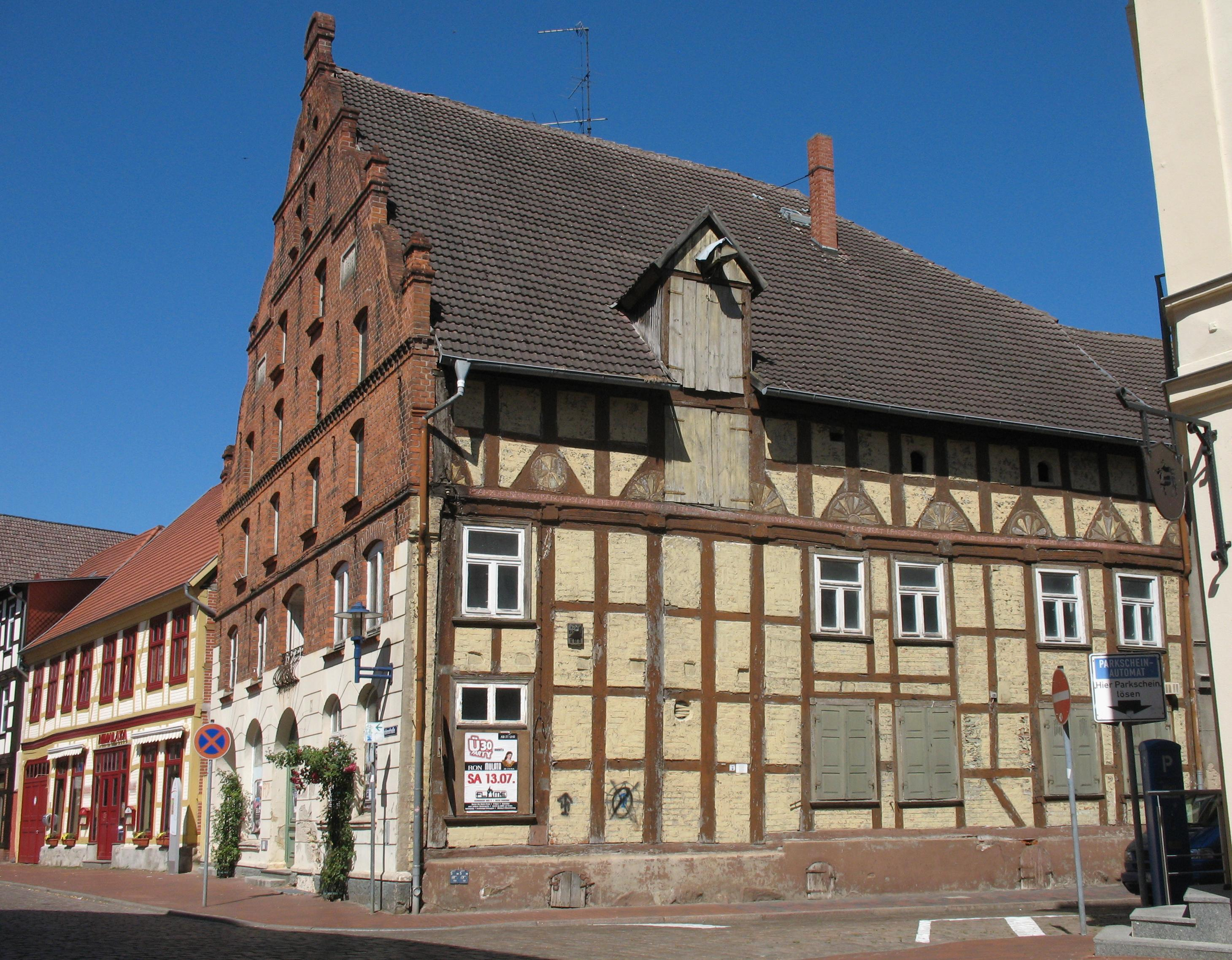
Timber-framed house

== Population development ==
Year	Population
1648	1,300
1789	4,000
1830	5,800
1850	6,270
1910	12,804
1939	16,000
1974	23,000
1990	23,800
2000	20,048
2005	19,348

== Climate ==
Climate data for Parchim (Marnitz), (1991–2020 normals)
Month	Jan	Feb	Mar	Apr	May	Jun	Jul	Aug	Sep	Oct	Nov	Dec	Year
Mean daily maximum °C (°F)	3.0 (37.4)	4.5 (40.1)	8.2 (46.8)	14.3 (57.7)	18.8 (65.8)	21.8 (71.2)	23.9 (75.0)	23.8 (74.8)	19.1 (66.4)	13.4 (56.1)	7.5 (45.5)	3.9 (39.0)	13.6 (56.5)
Daily mean °C (°F)	0.9 (33.6)	1.6 (34.9)	4.2 (39.6)	8.9 (48.0)	13.2 (55.8)	16.3 (61.3)	18.4 (65.1)	18.1 (64.6)	14.0 (57.2)	9.4 (48.9)	4.9 (40.8)	2.0 (35.6)	9.3 (48.7)
Mean daily minimum °C (°F)	−1.6 (29.1)	−1.2 (29.8)	0.4 (32.7)	3.5 (38.3)	7.2 (45.0)	10.6 (51.1)	12.9 (55.2)	12.9 (55.2)	9.6 (49.3)	6.0 (42.8)	2.5 (36.5)	−0.3 (31.5)	5.2 (41.4)
Average precipitation mm (inches)	59.5 (2.34)	46.7 (1.84)	47.6 (1.87)	35.8 (1.41)	50.9 (2.00)	60.3 (2.37)	72.0 (2.83)	61.3 (2.41)	51.0 (2.01)	55.3 (2.18)	47.8 (1.88)	56.6 (2.23)	646.3 (25.44)
Average precipitation days (≥ 1.0 mm)	17.7	15.4	15.1	12.4	13.9	13.9	15.4	14.0	12.9	15.1	15.8	18.1	179.4
Average snowy days (≥ 1.0 cm)	8.4	8.4	4.0	0.4	0	0	0	0	0	0	1.7	5.8	28.7
Average relative humidity (%)	88.0	84.0	79.1	71.9	71.5	72.3	73.3	74.2	79.8	85.0	89.4	89.3	79.8
Mean monthly sunshine hours	43.2	71.5	122.1	189.1	231.2	228.1	216.9	204.3	167.0	103.2	50.7	35.8	1,661.6
Source: World Meteorological Organization

== Sport ==
Motorcycle speedway is held at the Mecklenburgring, in the north west outskirts of the town off the Dammer Weg. The club Motorsportclub Mecklenburgring Parchim e.V. organise race meetings at the site and between 2002 and 2005, the team merged with Speedway Wolfslake and won the 2004 Bundesliga as RG Parchim/Wolfslake.

== Notable residents ==
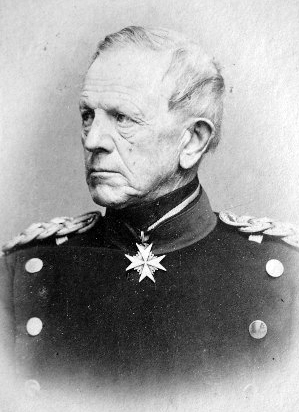
Helmuth Karl Bernhard von Moltke

- Johann Jakob Engel (1741–1802), author.
- Helmuth von Moltke the Elder (1800-1891), Prussian general field marshal, honorary citizen.
- Rudolf Tarnow (1867-1933), low German writer
- Elise Blumann (1897-1990), German-Australian expressionist painter
- Friedrich Hildebrandt (1898–1948), German SS Obergruppenführer, Gauleiter, executed for war crimes
- Ernst Goldenbaum (1898-1990), politician, chairman of the DBD and Minister of Agriculture and Forestry of the GDR, 1949-1990
- Éric Weil (1904-1977), self described as a post-Hegelian Kantian philosopher, studied violence
- Heinrich Alexander Stoll (1910-1977), author of adventure and historical novels.
- Hans-Wilhelm Ebeling (1934-2021), Lutheran clergyman and politician, chairman of the DSU, Minister for Economic Cooperation, 1990
- HA Schult (born 1939), object and action artist
- Jana Gerisch (born 1978), volleyball player
- Stefanie Weichelt (born 1983), football player
- Laura Larsson, (DE Wiki) (born 1989), podcast and radio host

== See also ==
- Wockersee
