= Ulrich Junghanns =

East German politician

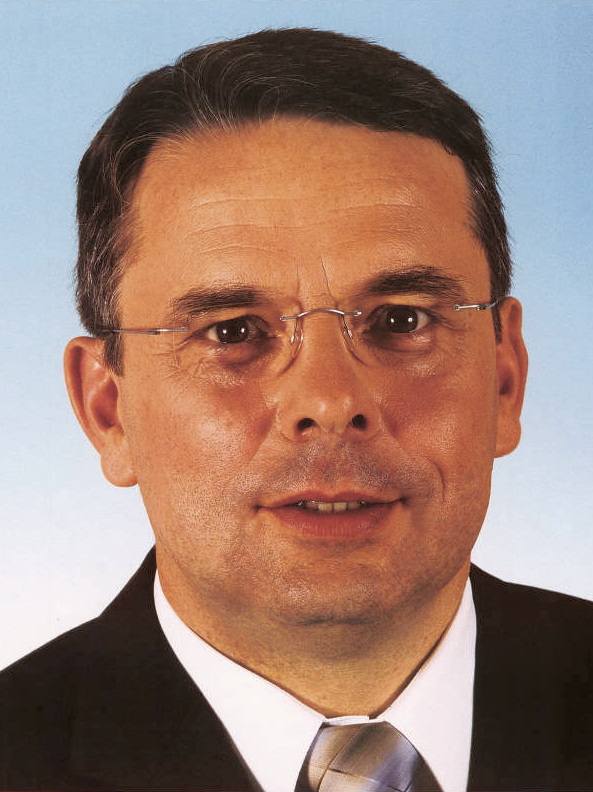
- Junghanns in 2004

Minister for Economic Affairs of Brandenburg
- In office 14 November 2002 – 6 November 2009
- Minister-President: Matthias Platzeck
- Preceded by: Wolfgang Fürniß
- Succeeded by: Ralf Christoffers

Deputy Minister-President of Brandenburg
- In office 20 February 2007 – 20 October 2008
- Minister-President: Matthias Platzeck
- Preceded by: Jörg Schönbohm
- Succeeded by: Johanna Wanka

Member of the Landtag of Brandenburg
- In office 13 October 2004 – 21 October 2009
- Constituency: State list

Member of the Bundestag; from Brandenburg
- In office 20 December 1990 – 26 October 1998
- Preceded by: Constituency established
- Succeeded by: Multi-member district
- Constituency: Frankfurt (Oder) – Eisenhüttenstadt – Beeskow (1990–1994); State list (1994–1998)

Leader of the Democratic Farmers' Party
- In office 25 June 1990 – 15 September 1990
- Preceded by: Günther Maleuda
- Succeeded by: Position abolished

Personal details
- Born: 25 May 1956 (age 70) Gera, East Germany
- Party: Christian Democratic Union (since 1990)
- Other political affiliations: DBD (1974–1990)
- Children: 2
- Awards: Patriotic Order of Merit (1988)
- Military Service
- Allegiance: (East Germany) German Democratic Republic
- Branch: National People's Army
- Service years: 1974–1976

Ulrich Junghanns (born 25 May 1956) is a German politician. From 2002 to 2008, he was Minister of Economy in the German state of Brandenburg and deputy Minister-President from 2007 till 2008.

Junghanns went to a Polytechnic Secondary School and later became an apprentice at the national stud farm at Moritzburg. In 1986, he graduated from a correspondence course of State sciences. In 1974, he joined the Democratic Farmers' Party of Germany (DBD), a satellite party of the ruling Socialist Unity Party of Germany (SED). In 1990, Junghanns was elected as the deputy chairman of the DBD and shortly after that became the acting chairman of the party. In September 1990, the DBD fused with the CDU and until 1992 Junghanns was member of the board of the German Christian Democratic Union.

In 1990, he was elected to the board of the CDU organisation in Brandenburg and as chairman of the CDU faction in the Landtag. From 1990 to 1998, Junghanns was a member of the Bundestag and chairman of the Brandenburg delegacy in the CDU faction. In 2007, he followed Jörg Schönbohm as chairman of the Brandenburg CDU, but resigned from this post after the electoral defeat of the CDU in the 2008 Local Elections in Brandenburg.

== Decorations ==
- Order of Merit of the German Democratic Republic
