= Wockersee =

Lake in Germany

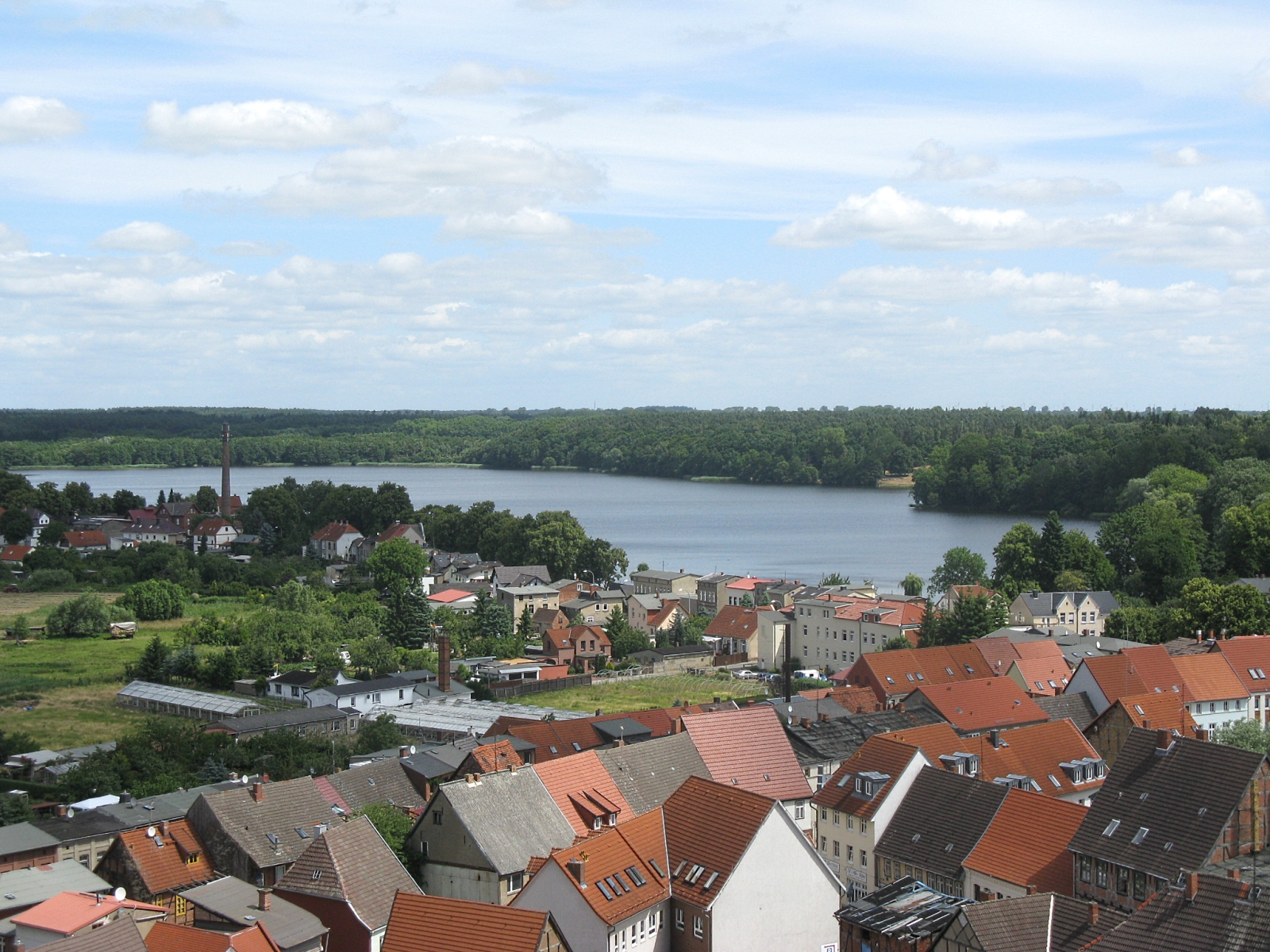

- Location within Mecklenburg-Vorpommern
- Location: Parchim, Mecklenburg-Vorpommern
- Coordinates: 53.436728°N 11.858558°E
- Primary inflows: Wocker
- Basin countries: Germany
- Max. length: 1.487 km (0.924 mi)
- Max. width: 0.598 km (0.372 mi)
- Surface area: 0.6 km^{2} (0.23 sq mi)
- Average depth: 3.8 m (12 ft)
- Max. depth: 6.4 m (21 ft)
- Water volume: 2,260,000 m^{3} (80,000,000 cu ft)
- Surface elevation: 44.1 m (145 ft)
- Settlements: Parchim

Wockersee is a lake in Parchim, Mecklenburg-Vorpommern, Germany. At an elevation of 44.1 m, its surface area is 0.6 km^{2}.
