= Bauern Echo =

East German newspaper (1948–1990)

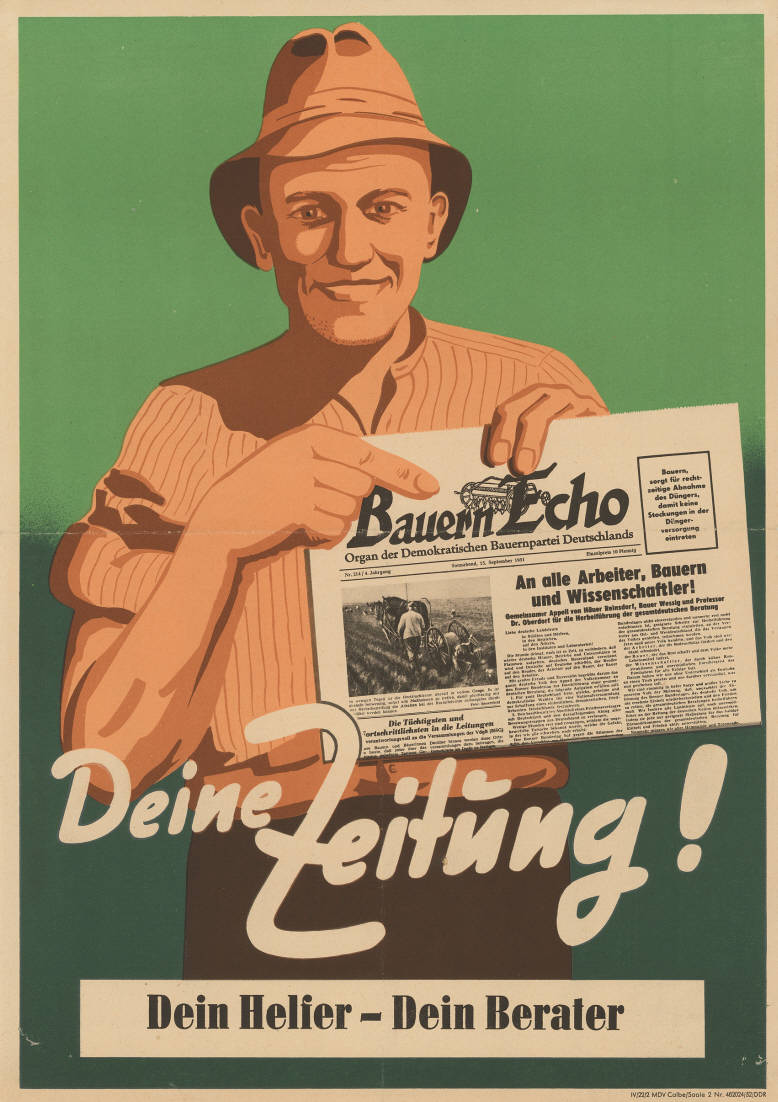
- Type: Weekly newspaper (1948–1962); Daily newspaper (1962–1990)
- Owner: Democratic Farmers' Party of Germany
- Publisher: Deutscher Bauernverlag
- Founded: July 18, 1948
- Ceased publication: 31 July 1990
- Political alignment: Communist
- Language: German
- City: East Berlin
- Country: East Germany
- OCLC number: 20805377

Bauern Echo was one of the newspapers which was published in East Germany. It was the official organ of the Democratic Farmers' Party of Germany and was in circulation between 1948 and 1990. Its subtitle was Organ der Demokratischen Bauernpartei Deutschlands (German: Organ of the Democratic Farmers' Party of Germany).

== History and profile ==
Bauern Echo was first published on 18 July 1948 and was owned the Democratic Farmers' Party of Germany. The paper was published by the Deutscher Bauernverlag in Berlin. Its target audience was East German farmers. The paper frequently emphasized the common interests of the farmers and industrial workers in the country. In January 1954 Bauern Echo published an article concerning the visit of an Iranian communist exile, Bozorg Alavi, to Aschersleben where he met with the farmers.

The frequency of Bauern Echo was weekly from its start to 1962 when it became daily. As of 1959 it had eleven district editions. In the early 1970s its circulation was 150,000 copies. The paper ceased publication on 31 July 1990 with the issue 176.
