= Ernst Mecklenburg =

East German politician (born 1927)

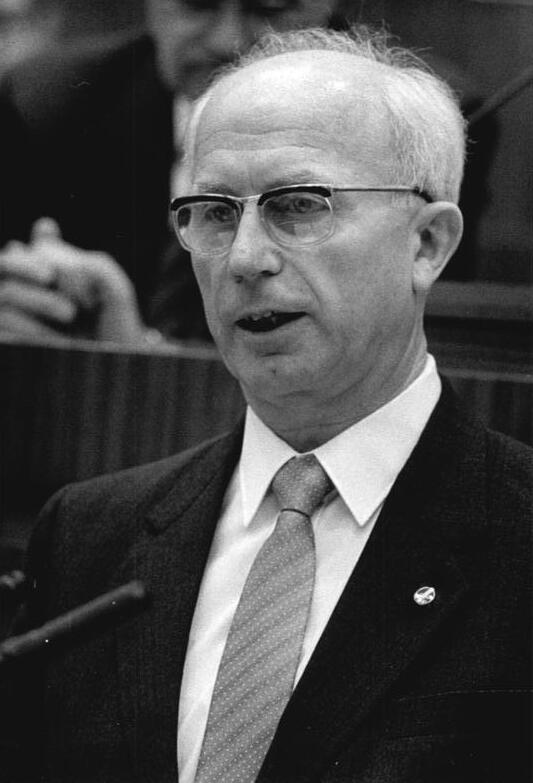

Chairman of the Democratic Farmers' Party of Germany
- In office 1982–1987
- Preceded by: Ernst Goldenbaum
- Succeeded by: Günther Maleuda

Member of the Volkskammer
- In office 1971–1987

Mayor of Rehna
- In office 1950–1952

Personal details
- Born: 3 June 1927 (age 98) Blöcken, East Prussia, German Reich (now Osokino, Russia)
- Party: Democratic Farmers' Party of Germany (1950–1990)
- Other political affiliations: NSDAP
- Profession: Politician
- Awards: Order of Karl Marx; Patriotic Order of Merit

Military service
- Allegiance: Nazi Germany
- Branch/service: Wehrmacht
- Years of service: 1945–1945
- Battles/wars: Second World War

Ernst Mecklenburg (born 3 June 1927) is a former East German politician who served as Chairman of the Democratic Farmers' Party of Germany (DFD).

== Biography ==
Mecklenburg was born in Blöcken (now Osokino in Guryevsky District, Kaliningrad Oblast) in East Prussia in 1927 to a farming family. He attended school to be trained as a teacher in Memel during World War II and was recruited into the Wehrmacht shortly before the war's end in January 1945. After the war, Mecklenburg was active in both agriculture and mining in the newly-formed German Democratic Republic. In 1950 he joined the Democratic Farmers' Party of Germany and the Free German Youth.

His first political office was that of mayor of the town of Rehna from 1950 to 1952. In 1954, he became district secretary of the DFD in Rostock and in 1963 was made a member of the executive committee of the party. He was elected to the Volkskammer as a member of the DFD in 1971. In 1982, Mecklenburg succeeded Ernst Goldenbaum as chairman of the party and served in this capacity until his own retirement from politics for health reasons.
