= Ernst Goldenbaum =

East German politician

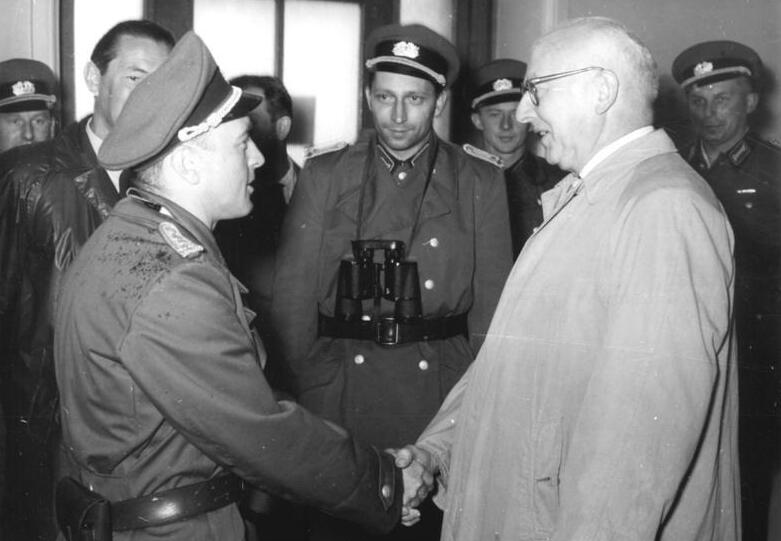
- Goldenbaum and members of the Volkspolizei near the Berlin Wall, 1961

Chairman of the Democratic Farmers' Party of Germany
- In office 29 April 1948 – 1982
- Preceded by: Office established
- Succeeded by: Ernst Mecklenburg

Minister of Agriculture and Forestry
- In office 7 October 1949 – 7 November 1950
- Preceded by: Edwin Hoernle (as President of Agriculture and Forestry of the German Economic Commission)
- Succeeded by: Paul Scholz

Member of the Volkskammer
- In office 1949–1990

Mayor of Parchim
- In office 1945–1945
- Preceded by: Rudolf Prestien
- Succeeded by: Otto Schmidt

Member of the Landtag of Mecklenburg-Schwerin
- In office 1924–1932

Personal details
- Born: December 15, 1898 Parchim, Grand Duchy of Mecklenburg-Schwerin, German Empire
- Died: March 13, 1990 (aged 91) East Berlin, East Germany (now Berlin, Germany)
- Party: Democratic Farmers' Party of Germany (1948–1990); Socialist Unity Party of Germany (1946–1948); Communist Party of Germany (1920–1946); Independent Social Democratic Party of Germany (1919–1920)
- Spouse(s): Käte Goldenbaum; Margarete Goldenbaum (1925-1951)
- Children: Klaus Goldenbaum; Ursula Goldenbaum
- Awards: Order of Karl Marx (1973); Star of People's Friendship (1969); Hero of Labour (1968); Patriotic Order of Merit, honor clasp (1965); Banner of Labor (1964); Medal for Fighters Against Fascism (1959); Patriotic Order of Merit, in gold (1958); Patriotic Order of Merit, in silver (1955); German Peace Medal (1955)

Military service
- Allegiance: German Empire
- Branch/service: Imperial German Army
- Years of service: 1917-1918
- Unit: 89th Grenadier Regiment
- Battles/wars: First World War; Western Front (WIA)

Ernst Goldenbaum (15 December 1898, Parchim – 13 March 1990, East Berlin) was a German politician who served as the chairman of the Democratic Farmers' Party of Germany from 1948 to 1982.

== Biography ==
Goldenbaum was born in Parchim, Grand Duchy of Mecklenburg-Schwerin. During World War I, he served in the Imperial German Army and he participated in the German November Revolution. In 1919, he joined the left-wing USPD and a few years later the Communist Party of Germany.

From 1923 to 1925, he was a member of the city council of Parchim, and from 1924 to 1932 he was a member of the Landtag of Mecklenburg-Schwerin. From 1932 to 1933, he was the editor of Volkswacht, a communist newspaper. After the Nazis seized power, he became a farmer and a member of the German resistance.

In 1944, he was arrested and he spent the last year of the war in Neuengamme concentration camp. In 1945, he was one of very few who survived the sinking of the SS Cap Arcona which claimed over 4000 lives.

After the war, he joined the Socialist Unity Party (SED), but in 1948, he co-founded the communist-sponsored Democratic Farmers' Party of Germany (DBD). The DBD was a close ally of the SED as a bloc party or a satellite party. Until 1982, Goldenbaum was the chairman of the party.

From 1949 to 1990 Goldenbaum was a member of the People's Chamber (Volkskammer). From 1949 to 1950, Goldenbaum was East Germany's first Minister of Agriculture and Forestry. Goldenbaum supported the SED's collectivisation in the 1950s and 1960s. From 1950 to 1963, he was the deputy chairman of the People's Chamber. After 1963, he was a member of the Presidium of the People's Chamber.
