= Günther Maleuda =

East German politician

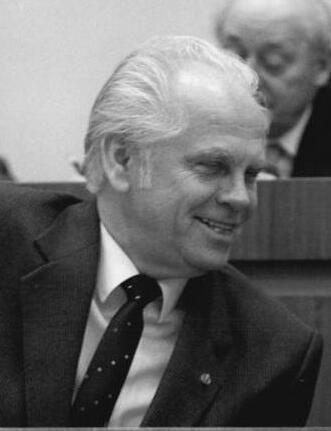
- Maleuda in 1989

Leader of the Democratic Farmers' Party
- In office 27 March 1987 – 25 June 1990
- Preceded by: Ernst Mecklenburg
- Succeeded by: Ulrich Junghanns

President of the Volkskammer
- In office 13 November 1989 – 5 April 1990
- Deputy: Gerald Götting
- Preceded by: Horst Sindermann
- Succeeded by: Sabine Bergmann-Pohl

Leader of the DBD/DFD group in the Volkskammer
- In office March 1990 – 1 September 1990
- Preceded by: Erwin Binder (DBD); Hannelore Hauschild (DFD)
- Succeeded by: Position abolished
Parliamentary constituencies
Member of the Bundestag for Mecklenburg-Vorpommern
In office 10 November 1994 – 26 October 1998
Preceded by	multi-member district
Succeeded by	multi-member district
Constituency	Party of Democratic Socialism List
Member of the Volkskammer for Schwerin (Arnstadt, Apolda, Weimar-Stadt, Weimar-Land; 1981–1990)
In office 5 April 1990 – 2 October 1990
Preceded by	Constituency established
Succeeded by	Constituency abolished
In office 25 June 1981 – 5 April 1990
Preceded by	multi-member district
Succeeded by	Constituency abolished

Personal details
- Born: 20 January 1931 Alt Beelitz, Province of Brandenburg, Free State of Prussia, Weimar Republic (now Drezdenko, Poland)
- Died: 18 July 2012 (aged 81) Bernau bei Berlin, Brandenburg, Germany
- Party: Independent
- Other political affiliations: Party of Democratic Socialism (Bundestag group); Democratic Farmers' Party (1950–1990)
- Children: 3
- Occupation: Politician; civil servant; party clerk; Farmer; Economist

Günther Maleuda (20 January 1931 – 18 July 2012) was an East German politician. From November 1989 to April 1990 he was the President of the People's Chamber (East German Parliament).

== Early years ==
He was born in Alt Beelitz, (today Stare Bielice, Poland). In 1950 he joined the Democratic Farmers' Party of Germany (Demokratische Bauernpartei Deutschlands). From 1952 to 1955 he studied Economics.

== Career ==
From 1958 to 1967 Maleuda was a member of the district council of Königs Wusterhausen, from 1967 to 1976 a member of the district council of Potsdam and from 1976 to 1982 he was a member of the district council of Halle. In 1981 he was elected as a member of the People's Chamber.

From 1977 to 1990 he was a member of the Presidium of the Democratic Farmers' Party of Germany (DBD). On 27 March 1987 Maleuda became chairman of the DBD and at the same time a deputy chairman of the Council of State.

On 13 November 1989 he was the successor of Horst Sindermann as President of the People's Chamber (until March 1990). Maleuda supported the reforms and took part in the round table negotiations.

Although his party merged with the CDU in October 1990, Maleuda refused to be a member of the Christian Democratic Union.

In 1994 he was elected as a (non-party) member of the Bundestag (German Parliament) on the PDS list. He remained a member until 1998.

Political offices
Preceded by Horst Sindermann	President of the Volkskammer; 1989–1990	Succeeded by Sabine Bergmann-Pohl
