= Éric Weil =

German-born French philosopher

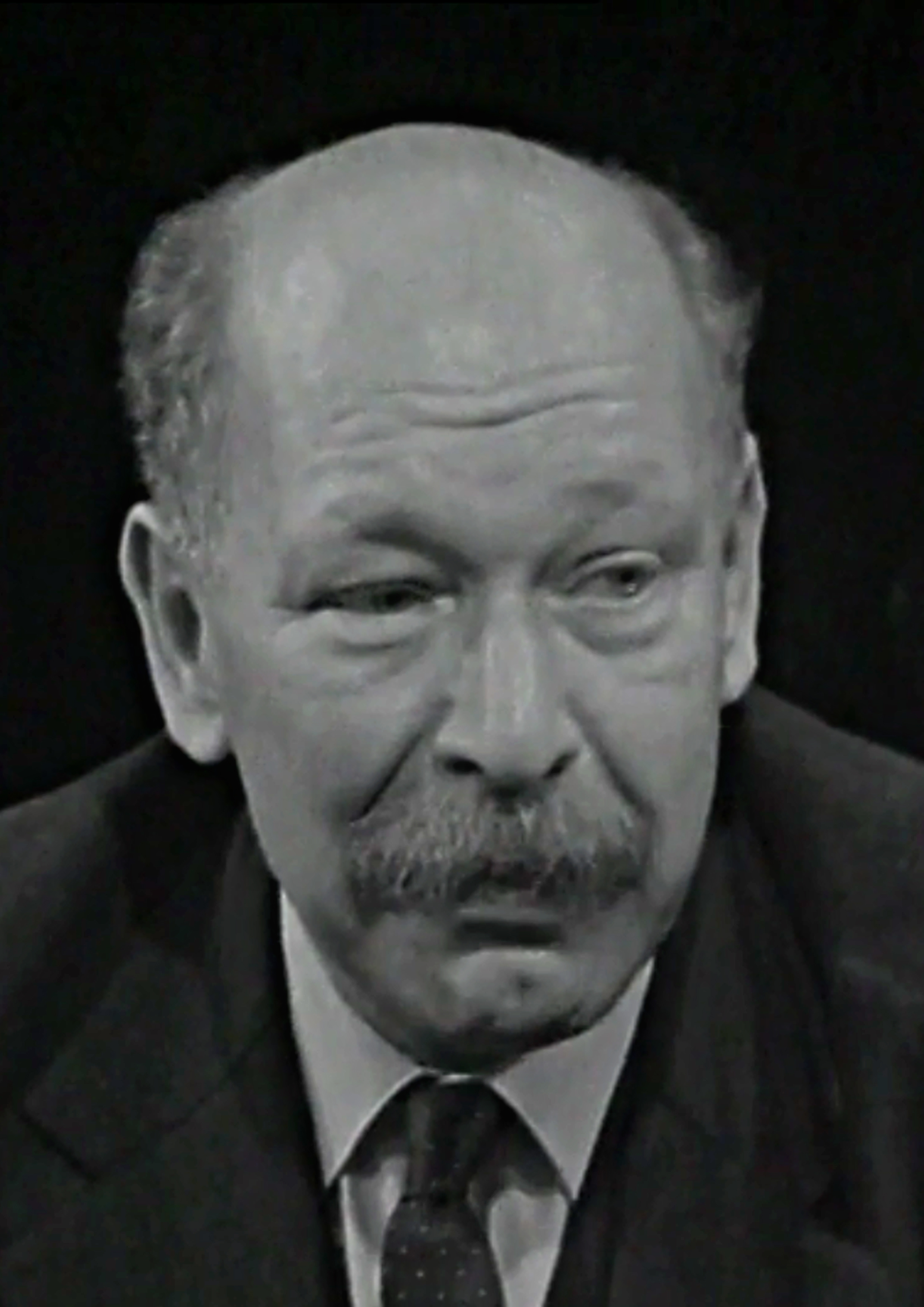
Éric Weil

Éric Weil (/veɪ/; French: [vɛj]; 4 June 1904 – 1 February 1977) was a French-German philosopher noted for the development of a theory that places the effort to understand violence at the center of philosophy.

Calling himself a post-Hegelian Kantian, Weil was a key figure in the 20th-century reception of Hegel in France, as well as the renewed interest in Kant in that country. The author of major original works, critical studies, and numerous essays in French his adopted language, as well as German and English, Weil was both an active academic as well as public intellectual. Involved in various fecund moments of French intellectual life, Weil was, for example, a participant in the famous lectures given by Alexandre Kojève on Hegel's Phenomenology of Spirit, and would go on to play an instrumental role at the journal Critique during its start and then serve as one of its editors for a number of years. An influential teacher, his students, such as Bourdieu, have noted Weil's formative role in their intellectual development. This influence was also at the origin of the creation of the Institut Éric Weil, a foundation and research library created by a group of his former students after his death.

A systematic thinker, Weil's works follow Kant's divide between practical and theoretical philosophy, a complete statement of his thought is developed in his Logique de la philosophie (1950), Philosophie politique (1956), and Philosophie morale (1961). These books show how the effort to understand violence by subsuming it under a discursive form is the basis of philosophical reflection. Because there are always novel forms of violence that grow out of older already understood and subsumed forms of violence, Weil insists on the role of history in philosophical discourse. The role of history is seen in Weil's political thought, for instance, where he rejects the contractualist notion of an original position and instead underlines the historic, context specific, and often violent, origin of political formations, usual by territory-grabbing military leaders. This historical origin is used to explain how cultural and political traditions are often inhabited by antique forms of violence that can resurge at any moment or can have perverting effects on the formation of political identity.

== Early life and education ==
Weil was born June 8, 1904, in the town of Parchim in the German Empire, to Louis and Ida (née Löwenstein) Weil. The Weils were a well-to-do Jewish family. He spent his entire childhood in Parchim where he was first a student at the Parchim Vorschule and then at the Friedrich-Franz-Gymnasium. He finished his studies at the Gymnasium in the spring of 1922 and left Parchim to go to Medical School in Hamburg. Just after Weil matriculated into university, his father died. Louis Weil's death led the family into material difficulties that would persist all throughout Éric Weil's student years.

During Weil's medical studies his interest in philosophy was already evident: his university registration from 1922 includes one of Ernst Cassirer's courses on Philosophy of Language. The following year Weil would move to Berlin while still continuing his studies in medicine. Over the next decade, Weil, now studying philosophy full-time, would move back and forth between Hamburg and Berlin numerous times. Between Hamburg and Berlin, Weil started his doctoral studies and eventually wrote his dissertation "Des Pietro Pomponazzi Lehre von dem Menschen und der Welt" under Cassirer. It is during this period that he started to publish reviews and articles, as well as work as a private tutor. It was also during this period that he started an association with the circle around Aby Warburg and the Warburg Library. Moving again back to Berlin from Hamburg in 1930, Weil became the personal secretary to the philosopher Max Dessoir, and became involved in the publication of his journal Zeitschrift für Ästhetik und allgemeine Kunstwissenschaft. In 1932 Weil published his doctoral dissertation. During this tumultuous period Weil read Mein Kampf and understanding the political implications on him as a Jew, he started looking towards his options abroad. He notably applied for a position at the University of Puerto Rico, which he did not receive.

== Flight from Germany ==
In April 1933, Weil moved to Paris. It was during this period that he started to see Anne Mendelsohn, the childhood best friend of Hannah Arendt and herself a German immigrant of Jewish extraction. Weil's early years in France were tumultuous; he moved frequently and was often short of money. But despite this, it was during this period that he and Anne married, first in a civil ceremony in Paris on the 16th of October 1934 and then in a religious ceremony in Luxembourg a week later. Luxembourg was to be the point of interaction between Weil and his relatives, because after leaving Germany in 1933 he refused to return for many years. During this period, despite the instability, Weil started to integrate into French intellectual life in Paris. He naturalized as a French citizen and continued to pursue his work on Renaissance humanism. He produced his study "Ficin et Plotin" around the Neoplatonism of Marsilio Ficino and his attempts, through the work of Plotinus, to fuse Platonism and Christianity. This work would remain unpublished until 2007. Around this time, he started the work that would culminate in the Logique de la philosophie as a reflection around the role that philosophical categories and discursive rationality play in history. His association with Alexandre Koyré, to whom the Logique de la philosophie was dedicated, also started during this period, collaborating with him on the journal Recherches Philosophiques from 1934 to 1938. He participated in Koyré's seminar on the Phenemonology of Spirit, continuing when it was taken over by Alexandre Kojève. Koyré was also to be the director of the work that he defended at the École pratique des hautes études "La critique de l'astrologie chez Pic de la Mirandole" which extended his work on the Renaissance, in order to have an equivalence degree in France. The events at the end 1930's uprooted the lives of those around Weil. His mother was forced to sell the family home in Parchim. The home of his sister Ruth and his brother-in-law Dr. Siegfried Cohn was ransacked and Siegfried was arrested. The following year, in 1939, the Cohns sent their daughters to the Netherlands to be hidden. Only Siegfried and the girls would survive the war, organizing transport to Australia.

== War years ==
The Second World War was to have, like for so many of his generation, a profound effect on Weil. This was not only because he was a German Jew, and so felt more deeply than gentile Europe the initial, and final, pressures of the Nazi regime, but also because this war provides and clear picture of Weil's philosophical, political, and human commitments. A shift had already happened in his thinking before the war. This fecund period in Paris marks the beginning of the reflection that was to become the Logique de la philosophie. Weil started to work out his theory about how fundamental philosophical concepts come to organize and structure the world. In this work Weil sets up a fundamental antinomy between liberty and violence, and shows how discursive rationality is the result of the interplay between these two forces. This is because, for Weil, discursive rationality is the product of the overcoming of violence by the interpretation of it under the logical form of contradiction. In a way, Weil's whole project can be understood as trying to understand attribution of meaningful content, whether it be to actions, propositions, or feelings, and how that meaning can be used as a resource to help individuals overcome violence. This however was not merely a theoretical engagement. At the start of the war Weil took a fake name, Henri Dubois, and enlisted in the French army and go to the front to combat the Nazi regime. In June 1939, 6 months after his enlistment Weil, as Henri Dubois, was taken prisoner and interned at Fallingsbostel. There he became an organizer of the prison resistance and wrote for its clandestine newspaper. He was to spend the rest of the war interned as a German prisoner. It was not until 1945, when the camp was liberated that Weil was able to return to Paris.

== Academic career ==
Returning to Paris, Weil almost immediately secured a post as a researcher at CNRS, and within the year he was able to finish writing the Logique de la philosophie. It was also during this period that Weil reformed his relationship with Georges Bataille, who he had met years before in the Hegel seminars. This relationship continued after the formation Critique, and led to Weil's involvement with the journal. During this period he defended a doctoral dissertation at the Sorbonne using the Logique de la philosophie as well as the slender Hegel and the State as the texts. His jury consisted of Jean Wahl, Henri Gouhier, Jean Hyppolite, Maurice Merleau-Ponty, and Edmond Vermeil.

Over the next several years Weil would be active in Parisian philosophical and intellectual circles, organizing numerous conferences, participating in seminars, writing articles. It was also during this period that Weil started teaching, notably as an instructor at the École pratique des hautes études. He was able to secure entrance into French higher education as a Maître de Conférences (Junior Professor) and found his first permanent post at the University of Lille. At 52, Weil finally had the security of a regular position. Over the next several decades, Weil would publish the two other major books completing his system, Philosophie politique, and Philosophie morale. In addition he would publish a book dealing with Kant, Problèmes Kantiens, and at the urging of his students two collections of his articles and shorter works, Essais et Conférences I (1970) and II (1971).

During this time his position as a recognized public intellectual grew, as he published in international journals, gave numerous international conferences, and was a visiting professor in the United States. In 1968, after 12 years in Lille, Weil took a position at the University of Nice and he and his wife moved to the south of France.

Weil was to be active up until his death, giving a final conference on Hegel just months before his death on February 1, 1977, at his home in Nice.

== Recognition ==
During his lifetime Weil was both a widely known and widely recognized public intellectual. He was one of the philosophers chosen to participate in the UNESCO Symposium on Democracy, alongside the likes of John Dewey, Henri Lefebvre, C. I. Lewis, Richard McKeon and others. He also participated in the famous colloquium at Royaumont that would be one of the first encounters between the newly self-consciously analytic and continental philosophical schools. Present at this meeting were philosophers including P. F. Strawson, Chaïm Perelman, J. L. Austin, Maurice Merleau-Ponty, W. V. Quine, and Jean Wahl. In addition to his selection among such thinkers, Weil was also honored with a variety of distinguished awards. In 1965 he was named a chevalier of the French Légion d'Honneur, in 1969 he received an honorary doctorate from the University of Münster. In 1970 he was elected as a member of the American Academy of Arts and Sciences, and in 1975 he was elected a member of the French Académie des Sciences Morales et Politiques de l'Institut de France. Other honors include numerous tributes and special editions of reviews and journals celebrating his work.

== Philosophical work ==
Analyses of Weil's work often split his practical philosophy and his theoretical philosophy. Following this traditional distinction largely inherited from Kant, we see the fullest expression of his theoretical philosophy in his Logique de la philosophie, and that of his practical philosophy in his Philosophie politique, and Philosophie morale. This distinction however is deceptive, because as is seen in all of these works and also in his numerous articles and critical studies, the distinction seems much less clear, and these two sides of his philosophical project mutually inform each other and work in unison. Nonetheless, there are significant distinctions between the two sides of Weil's philosophy.

=== The Logic of Philosophy ===
Weil's first major publication, as well as the work that treats the most thoroughly the theoretical aspect of Weil's philosophy, is the Logique de la philosophie. This work centers on how different philosophical discourses are articulated and how concepts acquire meaningful content. Through the progressive analysis of different types of philosophical discourses, this work also attempts to account for the possibility of understanding itself. In addition he shows how the concepts around which coherent discourse can be organized and the content that they articulate are irreducible, and that this content, under the name of categories, can be understood as the guiding concepts that organize human life and activity. Under these categories, coherent discourse can be understood as a "comprehensive grasp" of the real, which itself is born out of what Weil refers to as attitudes, otherwise understood as a specific normative stance in the individual's existence. Attitudes and categories both have specific relationship to meaning. The attitude is the "lived meaning" both in the invention of the meaning of a "form of life" as well as in its opposition to other forms of life themselves understood as attitudes. On the other hand, the category is this lived meaning taken now in the form of a concept, that is in a coherent discourse. Weil presents these philosophical discourses as being historically formed responses to the problem of violence. In the introduction to the Logique, Weil insists that any start to the project of philosophy is arbitrary, because nothing is proved and "nothing is established". Weil uses this contingency to present one of his major theses, and one of the concerns that runs throughout his philosophical work, the role of liberty understood as a choice between violence and discourse, or said otherwise, violence and meaning, or violence and reasonable action, all of which come back to being the same thing. The reason for this is that Weil's work does not overlook the possibility of violence as an absolute refusal of meaning, that is, as a refusal of discourse understood as reasonable action and justification through arguments. However, Weil does not limit his analysis of violence to this absolute refusal. His work also thematizes the violence that wants to impose meaning, wants to be the creation of meaning. In this way he shows how meaning can be more or less reasonable, as for instance the Hitlerian myth of a superior race. This reflection highlights the importance that Weil places on the criteria of universalizability, that is, to understand the meaning of meaning, whereby meaning is structured in a discourse that attempts to seize reality in its entirety and to give rational beings a domain of reasonable action.

The structure of the Logique is integral to the understanding of the text itself. Weil initially wrote the body of the text, that is, the exposition of categories, and then went back and wrote a long introduction that makes up nearly a quarter of the text. The introduction is itself an interpretative gesture of the work that follows it. One of the difficulties of understanding the Logique specifically, more so than Weil's other works, is that it is difficult to pinpoint exactly what Weil's own position is. Even from the start, in the introduction, Weil presents a protean view of philosophical discourse. One of the reasons for this is that according to Gilbert Kirscher, other philosophies concern themselves with trying to give positive theories of Being or of the Object or the Subject whereas the philosophical project of Weil is not interested in establishing an ontology or a metaphysics or even an anthropology, but is rather concerned with the "possibility of any thematization to come". In the introduction itself starts this multiform gesture whereby Weil gives a plurality of positions from which to view the project. In fact pluralism is one of the most important aspects of the philosophical effort of Weil. Since he understands philosophy as a project that an individual comes to in medias res their sole resource in order to start the project is the scraps and fragments of previous philosophical discourses that persist in their historical tradition. This position shows two aspects of the thrust of the Logique. On the one hand, these fragments that are left over in the tradition shows the target of philosophical discourse, which is an attempt to seize reality as it is lived as a coherent whole, on the other hand it shows the insufficiency of past attempts at universalization.

This search for coherency, and the drive towards the universalization of meaning by the elimination of incoherencies highlights the way that Weil thematizes violence. To seize reality as it is lived as a coherent whole means that even those things that resist thematization must find a place within the discourse, this includes violence. Weil notes "it is language that brings out violence. Man, speaking being, or if we prefer, thinking being – is the sole to reveal violence, because he is the sole to look for a meaning, to invent, to create a meaning to his life and to his world, a meaning to his life in an organized and understandable world, a world organized and understandable through reference to his life, as the country of the meaning of his life". In this sense, in order to be able to seize violence in discourse, and to subsume it in order to overcome it, violence must take on a discursive form. For Weil, violence is brought into discourse by giving it the logical form of contradiction. In this way, the irreducible philosophical categories that have at one point ordered and structured human understanding are discourses that have also arrived at overcoming pure violence for a time and have defined a specific notion of contradiction that has helped organize human society and understanding. However, as these discursive forms have been unable to achieve absolute coherence, new forms of discourse are elaborated that ask questions that the dominant discourse is unequipped to answer or even to recognize as valid.

Therefore, the introduction to the Logique, which presents the critical project, does so by taking on a diversity of viewpoints and examining different possibilities in order to situate the rest of the text in a philosophical continuity. Part of this effort is to show how specific philosophical discourses have come about, and the historicity of its own elaboration. In this way, Weil leans on a sociology and on an anthropology that the non-specialist would recognize specifically because it is built around definitions that have endured in the tradition. In order to start, many concepts, such as the notion of desire and satisfaction, or of reason and violence, are initially taken as unproblematic. However, the entire introduction is a sustained effort to highlight the difficulty of the project of definition and how the attribution of conceptual content is itself a problematic endeavor, and centers the body of the text's theme on discourse.

The rest of the text is broken into 18 chapters each corresponding to the 18 philosophical categories that are elaborated. The categories are: Truth, Nonsense, The True and the False, Certainty, Discussion, The Object, The Self, God, Condition, Conscience, Intelligence, Personality, The Absolute, The Oeuvre, The Finite, Action, Meaning, and finally, Wisdom. These categories correspond to historic philosophical discourses that have been elaborated, however their logical order is something that appears a posteriori and something that does not have a direct correspondence with the historic appearance of these discourse. Each category has a tripartite structure. There is the category itself, which is the discursive elaboration of a concrete content, and there is also the attitude, which can be seen as the source of categories, which is the pre-discursive normatively implicit ground for the content of the category as lived practices. Finally there is the reprise, which has been called "the most important concept from the Logique", and roughly sketched is the way that the content of an attitude or of a category is taken up and expressed in the language of another attitude or category.

==== Categories ====
Within the tripartite division on how conceptual content is attributed in attitudes, categories, and reprises Weil makes other important distinctions. In a long footnote in the Logique Weil makes an initial important distinction between categories:

Metaphysical categories: that is, the categories developed by metaphysics for use by particular sciences. It is these that we ordinarily have in mind when we speak of categories: from Aristotle (if not Plato) until Hegel and beyond, we understand, as categories, the fundamental concepts determining the questions according to which it is necessary to consider or analyze or question everything that is in order to know that it is so. They are metaphysical in this sense, that only the first science, that of Being as such can provide them; but they are essentially scientific in their use; said otherwise: elaborated by metaphysics, they don't guide it. In order to found his ontology, Aristotle doesn't use the concepts of essence, of attribute, of place, etc.; he uses the principle according to which reasoning can't go on infinitely — a principle that isn't founded on ontology and its categories, but which allows the conception of an original science. Kant doesn't build his transcendental ontology with the help of his table of categories but the help of the "ideas" of liberty and eternity, of the transcendental ideal, of the kingdom of ends. Hegel himself recognizes the difference between the Logic of Being (that of metaphysical categories), that of the Essence and that of Reality, the last of which must, among other things, make the meaning of the first part of the entire logic, starting, from the metaphysical categories, understood. It is essential that the two senses of the word be clearly distinguished in the whole course of this work, which is only interested in metaphysical categories to the extent that they reveal the philosophical categories, these centers of discourse starting from which an attitude expresses itself in a coherent fashion (or, in the case of categories refusing all discourse, can be grasped by philosophy's discourse).

Metaphysical categories can in this way be understood as meta-scientific or often as pre-scientific as they are attempts at grasping reality and at organizing scientific activity, however metaphysical categories claim nonetheless to create a correspondence between what they describe and how reality is. However, "Weil for his part rigorously abandons, in starting by truth, any representative, epistemological, ontological aims". Weil's interest in this work is philosophical categories, which are "constitutive of the philosophical discourse as an absolutely coherent discourse". In this way, all the categories until The Absolute thematize the different manners that philosophical discourses have attempted to grasp reality in its entirety by placing meaning outside of the discursive act and making it correspond to some way that the world really is in itself. For this reason Weil calls The Absolute "the first category of philosophy… [and] in the category of philosophy, it is not only a matter of thinking, nor of thinking the thought, but of thinking the thinking". This passage is revealing of Weil's understanding of his categorical project, because the passage to The Absolute unfetters Weil's project from attempting to link or correspond philosophical categories to Being, or the One, or substance, but instead ties it to the semantic project of meaning. In this way the philosophical categories, "no longer target the creation of philosophy as a science, they define a certain relationship to philosophizing, that is, to discourse and to the coherence of discourse". The absolutely coherent discourse, which is the constituent feature of the category of The Absolute is one which has the discursive and semantic tools to be able overcome contradiction by means of language precisely because the question asked is one of meaning and not metaphysical or ontological. However the passage to The Absolute also highlights another feature of Weil's philosophical project, which is to create discursive tools to thematize violence in order to overcome it. This is because the categories after The Absolute thematize the relationship to discourse, as for example, the absolute and knowing refusal of discourse and meaning in The Oeuvre, the destruction (and deconstruction) of coherence in The Finite, the realization of discourse in Action, and then two reflections on the role of discourse and the individual's relation to it in the categories of Meaning and Wisdom. This is why the choice of coherence through philosophy is the fundamental choice, because the possibility to leave discourse always exists, but it is a knowing choice because it is a choice made from a previously articulated discursive background. That is, an individual is never choosing to not enter discourse: the individual, with the full weight of the tradition and the partial forms of coherence available to them is choosing to leave discourse. And in that way, this refusal of dialogue, of an agreement reached through discussion and comprises, defines pure forms of violence, which is violence understood as violence because it has already been subsumed by the tradition.

==== Attitudes ====
The discursive background, a discursive content organized around a central concept, from which the person acts without being aware that this background is just that, is what Weil calls the attitude. However, even though this content is organized around a central concept, it has not yet been formulated in a self-consciously aware way that makes claims to coherence. In this way attitudes are composite and "they are translated by a discourse that is itself composite, that is, ambiguous and contradictory". The attitude is a practical posture that does not necessarily require that contradiction be resolved, as long as the life moves forward, that is, as long as the discursive resources left over in the tradition are sufficient to organize and order the individual's lived experience. However it is also what grounds categories as the implicit normative practices that categories define and thematize as a doctrine. As Marcelo Perine has noted: "it is the category that determines the purity and the irreducibility of the attitude, but it is the attitude that produces the category". In this way the doctrine of the category sets out to explain the normative posture of the attitude, however, this can only happen after the category has reached a full measure of its content and sense. In that way the philosopher who undertakes explaining the attitude by structuring its conceptual elements into a coherent whole has in fact already surpassed the attitude being explained. Because the attitude is built around a concept that organizes human activity, that activity cannot be critically understood from inside the concept itself. That is not to say that the community living in normatively organized way defined by the attitude has to be aware of the limits of that concept. In fact, the articulation of the attitude into a category underlines Weil's understanding of the project of philosophy. Because the choice between philosophy and violence is a choice made in order to give meaning to human activity and made in order to overcome violence, philosophical discourse is born out of the need to reorganize a world that is no longer seen as coherent. In this way, the theorist who can coherently explain the world has already surpassed the previous conceptual content. Humanity then, always finds itself in a historically situated tradition. Thus, the question of how to ascribe meaning and how to understand the world and oneself as an individual always presents itself anew. Weil asks the question near the end of the Logique: "Attitudes, both unconscious and without category, do they not direct, ordinarily, life?"

==== Reprises ====
The interplay between the categories and the attitudes, as well as all of the fragments of historical attempts to overcome violence through the elaboration of coherent discourse that make up the language of the tradition, are mediated by what Weil calls reprises. The reprise is "first off an interpretive act". This interpretive act articulates itself in two ways. First, in terms of how the category that is being surpassed interprets the new attitude. The category explains this new content in development in its own language, which is itself inadequate to the content. Second, the way that the new attitude justifies this content by using the language of other attitudes and categories. In this way "the reprise, to use a Kantian concept, is the Schema which makes the category applicable to reality and which thus allows concretely realizing the unity of philosophy and of history". However, because the reprise appropriates other discourses to explain a content which overflows a given discourse's capacity to adequately express it, the reprise allows an interpretation of the multiple centers of discourse that inhabit the lived human experience. Categories are a crystallization of a form of life that is actually lived as an attitude into a doctrine. Following that definition, it is the reprise that allows the different aspects of this form of life, as well as the different commitments, discursive, religious, political, held by those within this form, to explain and understand the extension and weight of these commitments.

=== Moral philosophy ===
There is a distinction that is normally drawn between Weil's practical and his theoretical philosophy, however an analysis of his practical philosophy also reveals how deeply intertwined the two are. Weil's practical philosophy can be understood as expressions of specific philosophical categories, specifically for Weil, moral philosophy is a development of "the content […] of the conscience". Which, following Kant, tries to articulate the "coexistence of nature and freedom". In order to show this development, Weil makes a distinction between formal morality and concrete morality. To start, formal morality is the philosophical analysis and elaboration of the moral criteria of "universality formulated by Kant" as well as its source in the notion of autonomy. This Kantian foundation leads to a development of a reflection on notion of rules, starting from "rule of the universalization of maxims". This development is a necessary step that is born out of the "loss of certainty" or a loss of confidence in concrete morality. If formal morality is the philosophical reflection that tries to reconcile autonomy, rules and the criteria of universality, concrete morality is the morality of a community that just up until the loss of certainty had claimed to fill that role. In this way there is a constant tension between what is seen as the rules of a community and the ever-developing exigency to universalize the content of moral concepts. Moral action for Weil is born out of the confrontation of different moralities, this recognition forces moral agents to conduct a reflection on the content of their moral system. Starting from this reflection, the agent is confronted with a moral choice that is decided by a criterion of universalizability. Therefore, Weil's moral theory places an emphasis on how individuals become aware of the criteria of universalizability in order to see themselves as the seat of moral law. This highlights one of the largest distinctions between Weil and Kant, because for Weil, this realization of the moral law, and this self-consciousness of the individual as a moral agent is only ever a possibility. Any individual, in any historic situation can just as well never become aware of their role as a moral agent responsible for the elaboration and practice of a moral content. This difference leads Weil to assert that "the essential task of the moral man is to educate men so that they obey on their own the universal law" Education plays a central role in Weil's philosophy in general, where the summit of moral and political action is to lead people to reason so that they can become reasonable for themselves. In this way the interplay between coherence, universality and reasonability forms a framework that defines moral action. Thus, an important distinction is the movement from the moral law towards the moral life, whereby notions such as happiness, satisfaction, desire, or duty start to take on a new concrete content, however a content which is now critical, having passed through the filter of the criteria of universalizability. In order to do so, "it is necessary to take a further step and consider morality as a relation to others, in the context of a concrete morality". This step, which is the transition from morality, understood as the conscientious action of the individual trying to reconcile a conditioned nature over which the individual has no control and the expressive invention of human freedom, leads directly to Weil's political thought. For Weil, political action is mediated by this responsibility towards others that translates the criteria of universalizability into a reflection around the notion of justice. This is because justice implies "both equality and legality" and requires the reconciliation of the universal and an actual concrete system of laws that, in a given historical context, can in fact prevent the realization of the universal. Thus the notion of justice demands a critical stance towards the actual legal practices of a given community in order to bring about this reconciliation.

=== Political philosophy ===
Weil's political philosophy is a further development of his theoretical thought. In this way, Philosophie politique, as well as the political thought that can be teased out of his other works, is an expression of the philosophical category of Action. The categories following The Absolute correspond to "a revolt against coherence". In this way, these categories respond to individual action in the face of the project of absolute coherence. The category of The Oeuvre highlights the possibility of a rejection of discourse because, "the language of the man of […] [this category] does not make a claim to universality or to truth. It is the language of an individual who wants to control the world, of an individual who is all for himself". This category is in part Weil's response to the possibility of totalitarian violence that ravaged much of the 20th century. Although Weil's political philosophy is strongly influenced by notions that are passed down from Aristotle, Kant, Hegel, and Marx, his focus is on the concrete aspects of human life as it is lived. The project of coherence for Weil is one that must constantly restart, and it always risks being disrupted by novel forms of violence. Weil has noted that Action is "the last category of discourse", and in this way it is the category in which human activity is understood as a "the unity of life and discourse", that is, the category which gives new concrete content to both actual lived human attitudes and to the discursive categories that elaborate concepts in order to understand that activity. All Weil's political thought starts in this way from the view point of the individual, that is from the moral question of freedom, and leads to a reflection on political organization. This political organization is to be understood organically, as are his analyses of the social mechanism and the relationship, which Weil develops from Ferdinand Tönnies between the community and civil society. But this organic development of communities and their interaction, often antagonistic with civil society, also leads to a reflection of the development of a theory of the State. In this way, the requirement for justice, which helps to enlarge the moral requirement of universalizability to a fully-fledged political requirement, goes hand in hand with the requirement that modern society provide a framework in which the individual's goals, objectives and projects are meaningful. This requirement of meaning reconnects political activity to Weil's larger project of coherence, because it is only within an organized State that such a requirement for meaning can be fulfilled. This return of the theoretical aspect of Weil's theory corresponds to the place that discursiveness takes in his practical philosophy. For Weil, the choice of philosophy, which is the choice of coherence, is a choice made in order to overcome and subsume violence by giving it a discursive form. In order for that coherence to be an actual concrete articulation of meaning, this leads the individual to become aware of their discursive commitments through open discussion. In this way, discussion because a serious mode of political action, because for Weil "acting is deciding after having deliberated" and it is only through open discussion that the conflicts, problems and differences see the light of day in order to afterwards be resolved through political compromises that reconcile different social strata and communities based around a criterion of justice. This criterion gives voice to the plurality of goals, needs, struggles, and values that exist at the interior of a given political organization. The historic and contingent content of theses commitments are developments of the natural evolution of the State, which Weil defines as "the organic set of institutions of a historic community". Thus, in Philosophie politique, Weil analyzes the State from a variety of perspectives. He provides a formal analysis of the modern State, which is based on a "formal and universal" notion of law, and provides an encyclopedic analysis of different forms of political organization from autocratic to constitutional. Underlying these analyses is a defense of constitutional democracy whereby "each citizen is considered as a potential ruler, and not only as ruled". This notion of potentiality implies a State defined by all citizens' capacity and eligibility to decision-making positions. It also implies a process of decision-making defined by open, public, transparent discussion involving all citizens, which is therefore universal in scope. In this sense, and by the general criteria of universalizability present in his thought, the notion of the State, and the objective to understand and overcome violence implies a form of cosmopolitanism whereby the progressive globalization of society leads to a global form of political organization. This global political organization would allow individuals to participate in an actual concrete form of freedom that gives voice to their concrete particularity and to the concrete particularity of their community. In this way a cosmopolitan global structure of States links back to the ultimate goal of Weil's theoretic philosophy, which is to explain the unity of action and discourse. Because, for Weil, it is in political organization that humanity's activity, as well as history itself, becomes meaningful, political organization is the backdrop against which moral action is possible and the concrete content of an individual's life can be articulated.
