= Democratic Farmers' Party of Germany =

East German political party

Democratic Farmers' Party of Germany Demokratische Bauernpartei Deutschlands
- Chairman: Ernst Goldenbaum (1948–1982); Ernst Mecklenburg (1982–1987); Günther Maleuda (1987–1990); Ulrich Junghanns (1990)
- Founded: 29 April 1948
- Dissolved: 15 September 1990
- Merged into: CDU
- Headquarters: East Berlin, East Germany
- Newspaper: Bauern Echo
- Membership (1988): 122,000
- Ideology: Agrarianism; Agrarian socialism (until 1989)
- National affiliation: Democratic Bloc (1948–1950); National Front (1950–1990)
- Colours: Green

Party flag

The Democratic Farmers' Party of Germany (German: Demokratische Bauernpartei Deutschlands, DBD) was an East German political party. The DBD was founded in 1948. It had 52 representatives in the Volkskammer, as part of the National Front. The DBD participated in all GDR cabinets (with the exception of the last GDR cabinet). The founding of the DBD was an attempt by the SED to weaken the influence of CDU/LDPD in the rural community by establishing a party loyal to the SED. The leadership cadre came mainly from the ranks of the SED. In the late 1980s, the party had 117,000 members.

After the fall of Berlin Wall, the party initially tried to find itself a niche as ecological agrarian party, but the first free Volkskammer election (1990) netted it only nine seats. In 1990 the DBD merged with the Christian Democratic Union.

== International contacts ==
The DBD had friendly relations with peasants' parties in other Eastern Bloc countries. It had close contacts with the Polish United People's Party (Zjednoczone Stronnictwo Ludowe, ZSL) and the Bulgarian Agrarian National Union (Bǔlgarski Zemedelski Naroden Sǔyuz, BZNS). Besides that, there were some contacts with farmers' associations in West Germany. They had also some contacts with agrarian parties in Finland (Centre Party) and in Sweden (Centre Party).

== Electoral history ==
=== Volkskammer elections ===
Election	Votes	%	Seats	+/–
1949	as part of Democratic Bloc		15 / 330 (Note: The 1,400 elected members of the Third German People's Congress selected the members of the second German People's Council.)	–
1950	as part of National Front		30 / 400	▲15
1954	as part of National Front		45 / 400	▲15
1958	as part of National Front		45 / 400	Steady
1963	as part of National Front		45 / 434	Steady
1967	as part of National Front		45 / 434	Steady
1971	as part of National Front		45 / 434	Steady
1976	as part of National Front		45 / 434	Steady
1981	as part of National Front		52 / 500	▲7
1986	as part of National Front		52 / 500	Steady
1990	251,226	2.2%	9 / 400	▼43

== Chairmen of the DBD ==
- Ernst Goldenbaum, 1948–1982
- Ernst Mecklenburg, 1982–1987
- Günther Maleuda, 1987–1990
- Ulrich Junghanns, 1990
