= Ralf Christoffers =

German politician (born 1956)

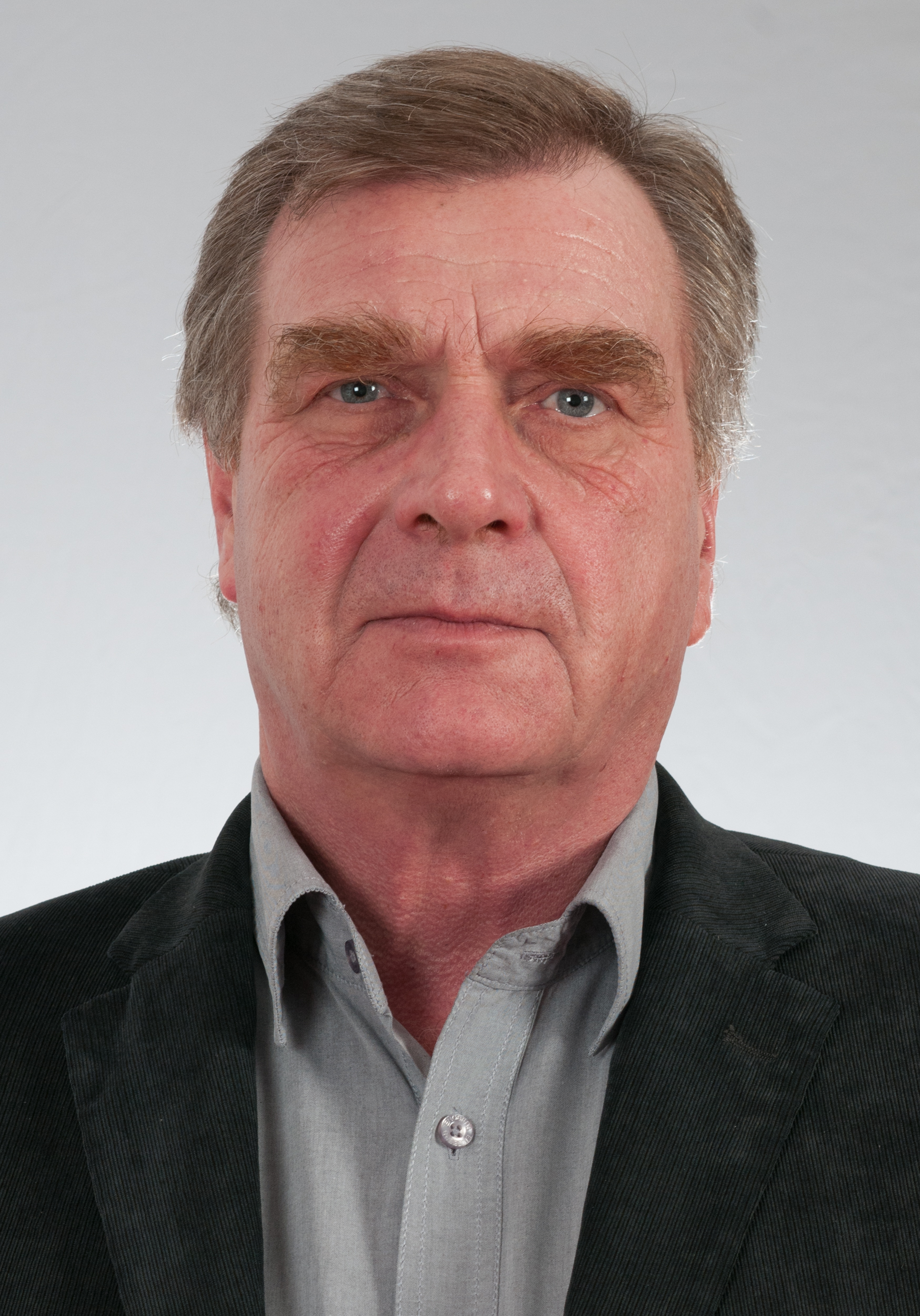

Minister of Economic Affairs and European Affairs of Brandenburg
- In office 2009–2014

Member of the Landtag of Brandenburg
- In office 1994–2019

Personal details
- Born: October 8, 1956 (age 69) Rostock, then East Germany, now Federal Republic of Germany
- Party: PDS (pre-2007) Die Linke (2007-present)

Ralf Christoffers (born October 8, 1956) is a German politician who served in the Landtag of Brandenburg from 1994 to 2019 and as Minister of Economic Affairs and European Affairs of Brandenburg in the Cabinet of Ministers-President Matthias Platzeck and Dietmar Woidke from 2009 to 2014.

== Life ==
Christoffers was enrolled in vocational training as a shipbuilder and locksmith from 1973 to 1981. He later studied social science at the Parteihochschule Karl Marx, the party school of the Socialist Unity Party of Germany, and worked as a philosophy lecturer at the Free German Youth-administered Wilhelm Pieck youth academy in Bogensee until 1990. From 1991 to 1994 he served as a research associate in the PDS Group of the Landtag of Brandenburg.

== Early political career ==
Christoffers joined the Party of Democratic Socialism (PDS) in 1990 and remained a member of the party until 2007, when PDS, which was renamed The Left Party. PDS in 2005, merged with the Electoral Alternative for Labor and Social Justice (WASG) to form a new party, The Left (Die Linke). From October 1994 to 2019, he served as a member of the Landtag (State Parliament) of Brandenburg.

== Ministerial career ==
After the 2009 state election, which produced a so-called “red-red coalition” composed of the SPD and Die Linke, Christoffers was appointed Minister of Economic Affairs and European Affairs in the 3rd Cabinet of Social Democratic Party (SPD) Minister-President Matthias Platzeck, succeeding Ulrich Junghanns of the Christian Democratic Union. He remained in this position under Minister-President Dietmark Woidke until retiring from the post in 2014.

Christoffers faced criticism from within his party for his support of the continuation of lignite mining in the region of Lusatia in southeast Brandenburg. In a 2010 interview, Wolfgang Nešković, Die Linke Member of the Bundestag for Cottbus – Spree-Neiße, criticized Christoffers’ position for both environmental and political reasons, arguing that support for lignite mining could result in Die Linke being perceived as being to the right of the SPD, their coalition partner.

== Other activities ==
Christoffers is a member of the Board of Directors of the Sparkasse Barnim, a public savings bank based in Eberswalde in the district of Barnim, Brandenburg, and the Investment State of the State of Brandenburg (ILB).

From 2010 to 2014, Christoffers was one of four representatives of the State of Brandenburg on the supervisory board of state-owned airport operator Flughafen Berlin Brandenburg GmbH.
