= Katharina Slanina =

German politician (born 1977)

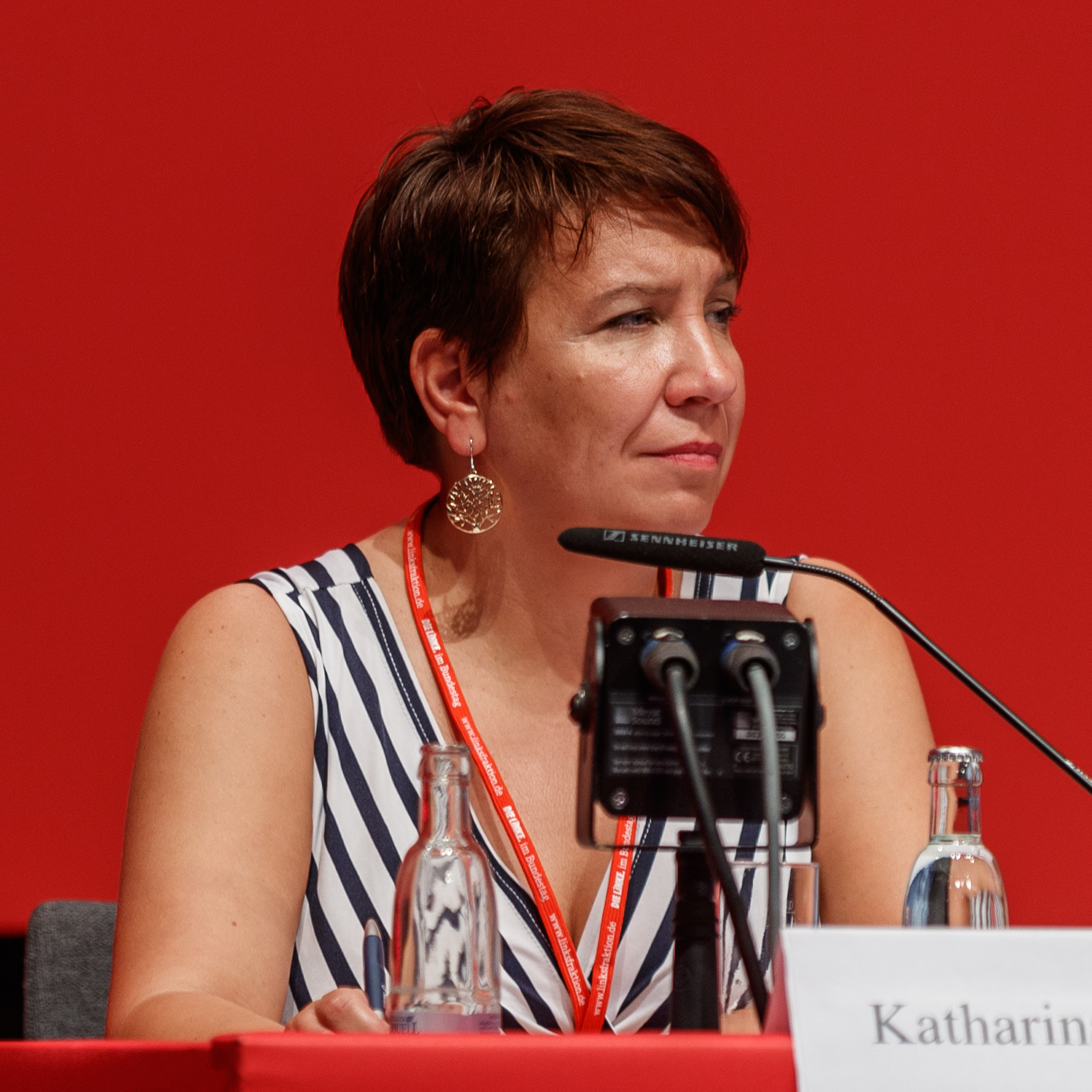
Slanina in 2022

Katharina Slanina (born 30 May 1977) is a German politician (Die Linke). She has been the state chairwoman of The Left Brandenburg since 2020 and the association council chairwoman of People's Solidarity Brandenburg since 2023.

== Life ==
Slanina studied legal science at the Humboldt University of Berlin and has a degree in business administration (FH). She works as a lawyer and was initially a human resources officer and then head of human resources until her appointment as parliamentary group manager of the Left Party in the Bundestag on 1 March 2022. She held this position until the parliamentary group was dissolved on 6 December 2023. Before that, she worked in various investigative committees in the Brandenburg state parliamentary group.

In addition to her position as state chairwoman of the Left Party in Brandenburg, Slanina is also deputy district chairwoman of the Left Party in Barnim. From 2016 to 2020, she was a member of the state arbitration commission of her state association for four years. In 2019, she ran for full-time mayor of Schorfheide and lost to the mayoral candidate of the Schorfheide Alliance by a margin of 29 votes.

In November 2023, she was elected chairwoman of the Association Council of People's Solidarity Brandenburg State Association.
