= Andreas Galau =

German politician (born 1967)

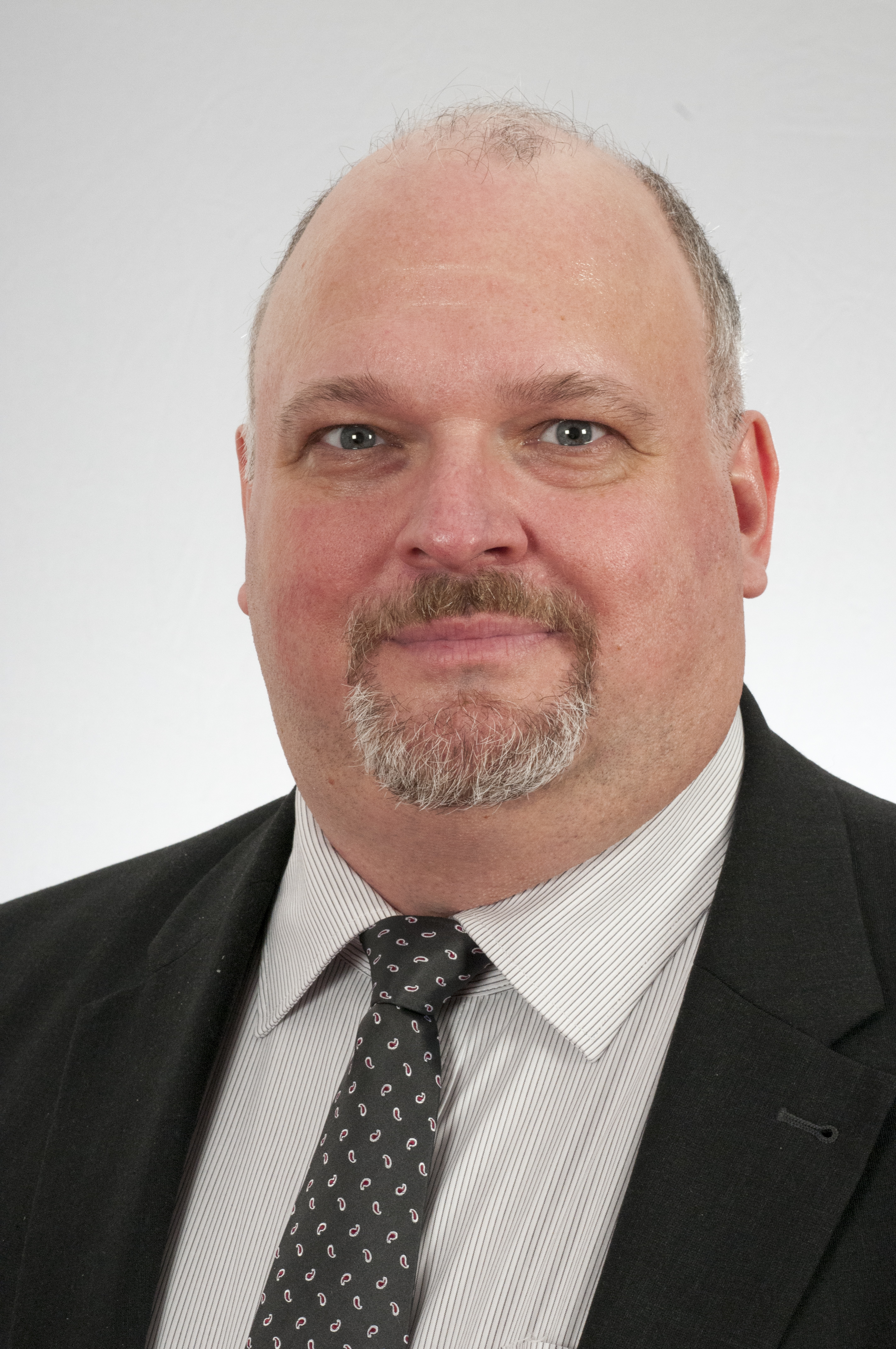
- Galau in 2016

Member of the Landtag of Brandenburg
- Incumbent
- Assumed office 8 October 2014
- Constituency: Uckermark III/Oberhavel IV (2024–present)

Personal details
- Born: 12 December 1967 (age 58) Berlin
- Party: Alternative for Germany (since 2013)

Andreas Galau (born 12 December 1967 in Berlin) is a German politician serving as a member of the Landtag of Brandenburg since 2014. From 2019 to 2024, he served as vice president of the Landtag.
