= Andreas Büttner =

German politician (born 1973)

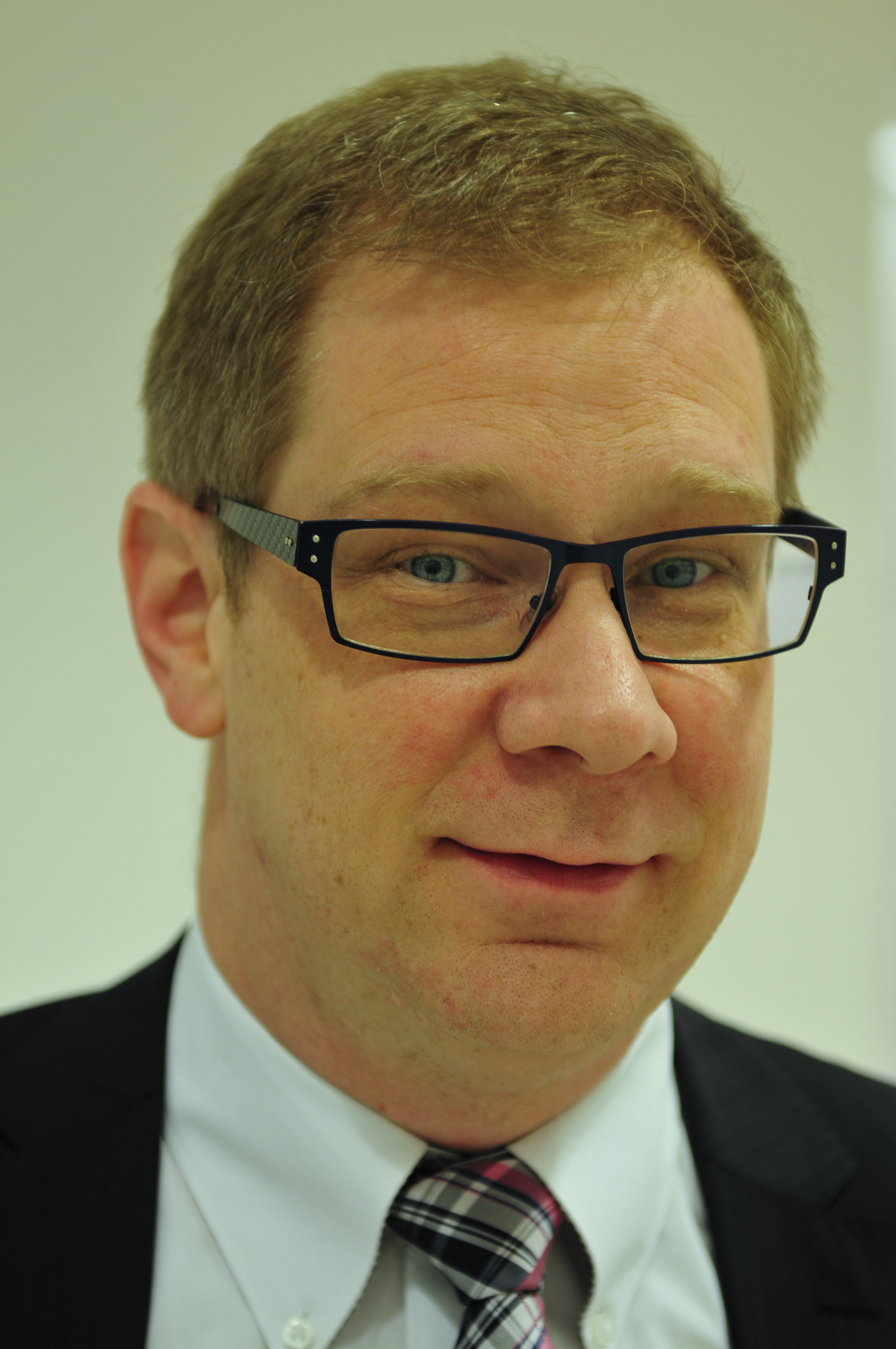
- Büttner in 2014

Member of the Landtag of Brandenburg
- In office 25 September 2019 – 19 June 2024
- Succeeded by: Carsten Preuß
- In office 21 October 2009 – 8 October 2014

Personal details
- Born: 3 July 1973 (age 52) Kassel
- Party: Die Linke (since 2015, until 2026)

Andreas Büttner (born 3 July 1973 in Kassel) is a German politician serving as antisemitism commissioner of Brandenburg since 2024. He was a member of the Landtag of Brandenburg from 2009 to 2014 and from 2019 to 2024.
