= Left Youth Solid =

Youth organization of the German political party The Left

Left Youth ['solid] Linksjugend ['solid]
- Founded: 1999 ('solid); 20 May 2007 (Left Youth Solid)
- Headquarters: Berlin, Germany
- Membership: 14,300
- Ideology: Socialism; Anti-fascism; Grassroots democracy
- Position: Left-wing to far-left
- Mother party: The Left
- Website: http://www.linksjugend-solid.de/

The Linksjugend ['solid] (en: Left Youth ['solid]) is a political youth organisation in Germany. It is the official youth wing of the political party The Left. It was formed in 2007 as the legal successor to ['solid] – die sozialistische jugend (en: Solid: the socialist youth) which was the unofficial youth wing of the Left Party and its predecessor PDS. The name "solid" comes from sozialistisch, links, demokratisch (socialist, left, democratic.) As of 2026, it has about 14,300 members. Its membership has doubled from 2024 to 2026.

== History ==
Old logo

Solid: the socialist youth was formed in Hanover in June 1999 and was accepted by the Party of Democratic Socialism as a youth organisation "close to PDS" in March 2002. Membership is for people between the ages of 14 and 35 and in March 2005 they had 1,500 members.

Before 1999 the PDS's youth organisation was Arbeitsgemeinschaft Junge GenossInnen; since then, most young members of the Left-Party have concentrated within ['solid]. But due to differences, other young members formed the "PDS Youth", a youth organisation integrated within the party and by self-definition of the group serving to form future cadres for the full-fledged party. The PDS-youth was small compared to ['solid] and only represented in a small number of the federal States of Germany.

On Solid's federal delegate congress on 20 May 2007, the organisation reorganised to the present structure including the former PDS Youth and the youth organisation of WASG. This was a response to the fusion of the Left Party/PDS and WASG.

Following the Left's strong performance and renewed image in the 2025 German federal election, Left Youth Solid began to advance its hitherto ambiguous stances on revolution and the Israel-Gaza war, supporting a socialist revolution in Palestine and recognising Israel's 'colonial character'.
