= Fritze =

Fritze is both a surname and a given name. Notable people with the name include:

- Caroline Fritze (born 2000), German judoka
- Georg Fritze (1874–1939), German theologian and anti-fascist
- Gregory Fritze, American classical composer and tubist
- Ronald H. Fritze (born 1951), American encyclopedist, historian and writer
- Fritze Carstensen (1925–2005), Danish swimmer
