= Grete Keilson =

German politician

Head of the International Relations Department of the Central Committee
- In office 1948–1952
- Secretary: Wilhelm Pieck; Walter Ulbricht
- Deputy: Peter Florin
- Preceded by: Position established
- Succeeded by: Peter Florin

Head of the Personnel Policy Department of the Central Committee
- In office 21 April 1946 – 1948 Serving with Alexander Lösche
- Secretary: Erich Gniffke; Franz Dahlem
- Preceded by: Position established
- Succeeded by: Philipp Daub

Personal details
- Born: Margarete Schnate; 21 December 1905 Berlin, Kingdom of Prussia, German Empire (now Germany)
- Died: 4 January 1999 (aged 93) Dresden, Saxony, Germany
- Party: Socialist Unity Party (1946–1989)
- Other political affiliations: Communist Party of Germany (1947–1946)
- Spouse(s): Max Keilson 1927 - 1953 (his death); Klaus Fuchs 1959 - 1988 (his death)
- Occupation: Politician; Party Functionary
- Awards: Patriotic Order of Merit, 1st class; Star of Peoples' Friendship

Margarete "Grete" Fuchs-Keilson (21 December 1905 – 4 January 1999) was a German politician and official in the Communist Party of Germany (KPD) and the Socialist Unity Party of Germany (SED).

== Biography ==
Margarete Schnate was born in Berlin on 21 December 1905, the daughter of a labourer. She attended Volksschule (elementary school) and Handelsschule (trade school) there. She joined the Young Communist League of Germany (KJD) in 1922, and the Communist Party of Germany (KPD) in 1925. She went to work as an assistant to Ernst Thälmann, the General Secretary of the KPD. In 1927 she married the graphic artist and journalist Max Keilson, who accompanied her as part of the 1928 delegation of the Central Committee of the Communist Party to the 6th World Congress of the Communist International (Comintern) in Moscow in 1928. The following year she became assistant to Georgi Dimitrov, the manager of Western European offices of Comintern, who was living in Berlin under the pseudonym of Rudolf Hediger, having fled his native Bulgaria and been sentenced to death in 1924. Working under the codename of Marianne, she helped prepare and assemble forged visas and travel documents that were produced by a counterfeiting group in the Berlin suburb of Wilmersdorf.

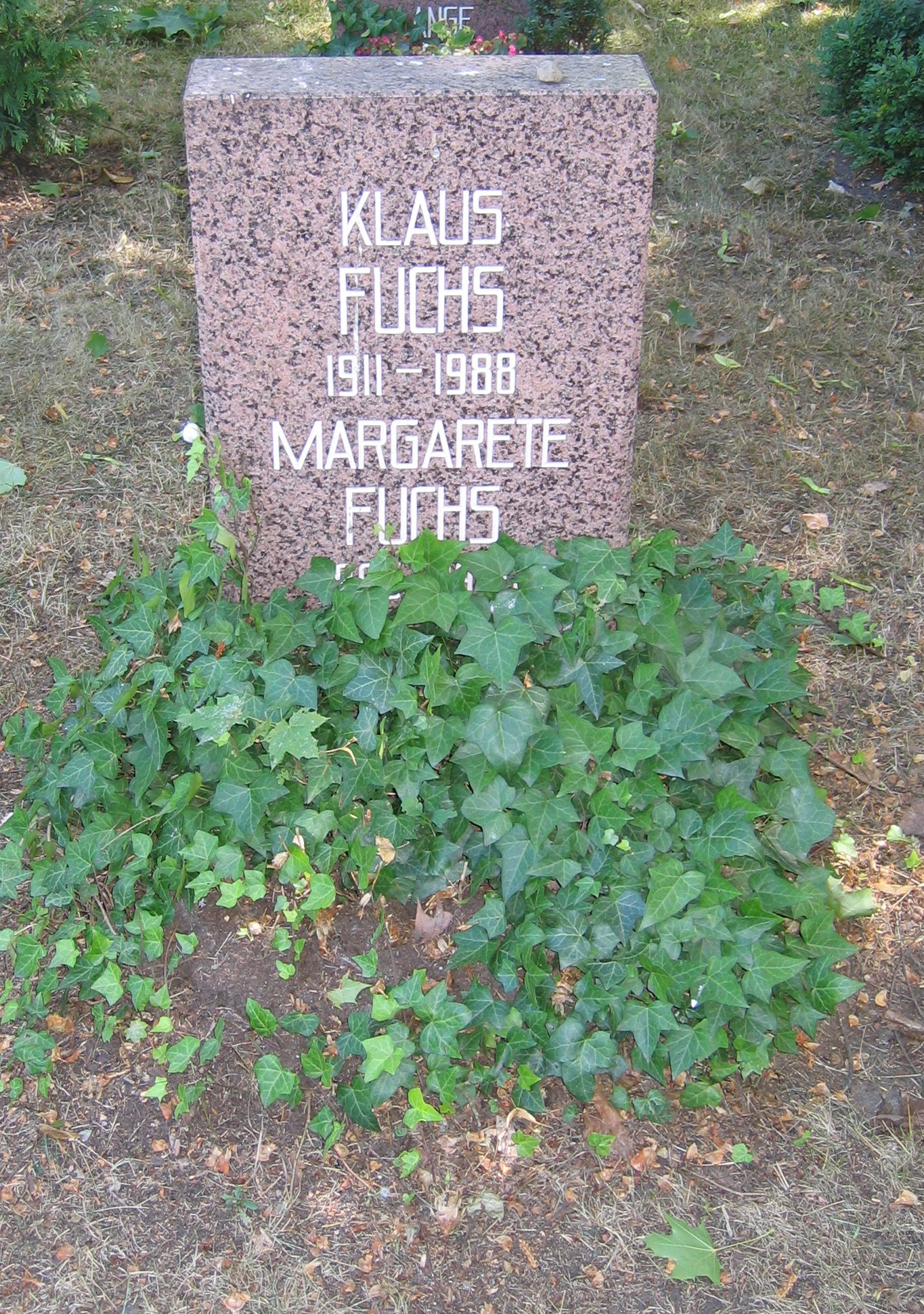
The grave of Margarete Fuchs-Keilson in Berlin

After Dimitrov was arrested on 9 March 1933 for alleged complicity in starting the Reichstag fire, for which he was later acquitted, Keilson used forged documents herself to flee to Copenhagen. She then relocated to Paris, where she worked for the Congress against Fascism and War under the codename Agnes. While there, she met the physicist Klaus Fuchs, whom she helped to escape to Britain. She then worked for the Central Committee of the KPD, coordinating KPD cells operating outside Germany under the code names Agnes, first in Prague in 1935 and 1936, and then back in Paris. She travelled to the Soviet Union under the name of Anni Grob, her Russian visa endorsed by Wilhelm Pieck and Walter Ulbricht.

The German occupation of Czechoslovakia ended the mission there, and in 1939 Grete and Max sought asylum in the Soviet Union. The Molotov–Ribbentrop Pact made this a dangerous time for German communists in the Soviet Union; thousands were deported to Germany. Grete worked at the Comintern office in Moscow as an assistant to Pieck. In 1943 she became involved with the National Committee for a Free Germany (NKFD) and the League of German Officers (BDO), and visited prisoner of war camps to find recruits.

Keilson returned to Germany in June 1945, where she was Head of the Personnel Policy Department of the Central Committee of the KPD, and then, after the 1946 merger of the Social Democratic Party of Germany (SPD) with the KPD, of the new Socialist Unity Party of Germany (SED). From 1948 to 1953, she was the director of the Department of International Relations of the Central Committee of the SED. She was superseded by Peter Florin, and became one of his deputies. In this role, she was a member of the Foreign Affairs Commission at the SED Politburo under the direction of Ulbricht and then Heinrich Rau. In this role she was a member of the Central Committee Commission for travelling abroad, led by Secretary of State William Zaisser that approved any travel abroad by SED officials.

Keilson's husband Max died 9 November 1953. After Klaus Fuchs was released from prison in Britain where he had been convicted on espionage charges and deported to East Germany in 1959, Keilson greeted him on arrival at Berlin Schönefeld Airport and they married later that year. From 1959 until her retirement in 1970, she worked in the press department of the East German Ministry for Foreign Affairs. For her achievements in East Germany and her support for the SED she received numerous awards including the Patriotic Order of Merit in silver in 1955, the Banner of Labour in 1960, the Patriotic Order of Merit in gold in 1970, and the Star of People's Friendship in 1985. She died in Dresden in unified Federal Germany on the 4th of January 1999. She was cremated and her ashes interred with those of Klaus Fuchs in the "Pergolenweg", the memorial to the socialists in the Zentralfriedhof Friedrichsfelde in Berlin.
