= Peter Florin =

East German politician and diplomat

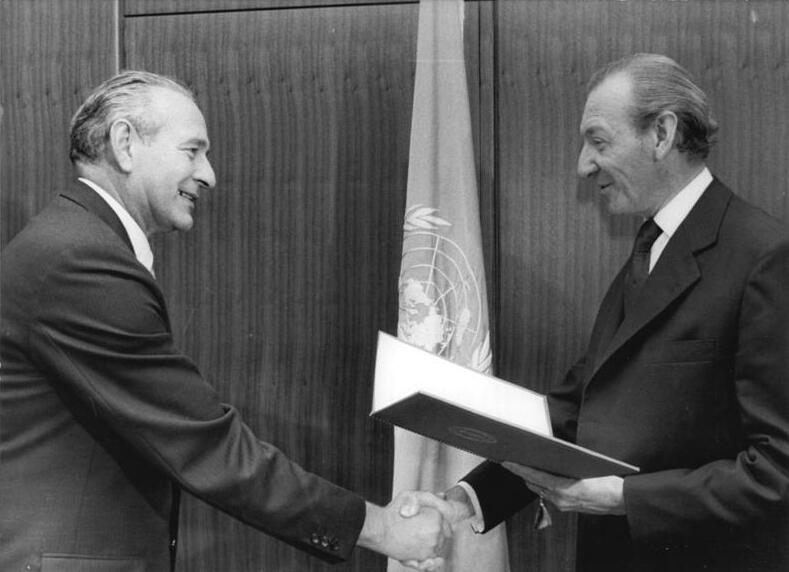
- Florin (left) and Kurt Waldheim, 1973

President of the United Nations General Assembly
- In office 1987–1988
- Preceded by: Humayun Rashid Choudhury
- Succeeded by: Dante Caputo

East German Ambassador to the United Nations
- In office 1973–1982
- Preceded by: Horst Grunert
- Succeeded by: Harry Ott

East German Ambassador to Czechoslovakia
- In office 1967–1969
- Preceded by: Heinz Willmann
- Succeeded by: Herbert Krolikowski

Head of the International Relations Department of the Central Committee
- In office 1953–1966
- Secretary: Walter Ulbricht; Hermann Axen
- Preceded by: Grete Keilson
- Succeeded by: Paul Markowski
Volkskammer
Member of the Volkskammer for Dresden-Süd, Dresden-West, Dresden-Mitte
In office 19 November 1954 – 5 April 1990
Preceded by	Multi-member district
Succeeded by	Constituency abolished

Personal details
- Born: 2 October 1921 Cologne, Rhine Province, Free State of Prussia, Weimar Republic (now North Rhine-Westphalia, Germany)
- Died: 17 February 2014 (aged 92) Berlin, Germany
- Party: Socialist Unity Party (1946–1989)
- Other political affiliations: Communist Party of Germany (1945–1946)
- Parent: Wilhelm Florin (father)
- Education: D. Mendeleev University of Chemical Technology (Dipl.-Ing.)
- Occupation: Diplomat; Party Functionary
- Awards: Order of the Red Star; Patriotic Order of Merit, 1st class; Medal for Fighters Against Fascism; Banner of Labor; Order of the Patriotic War; Order of Karl Marx; Star of People's Friendship; Hero of Labour; Order of Karl Marx
- Military Service
- Allegiance: Soviet Union
- Branch: Red Army
- Service years: 1941–1944
- Conflicts: Second World War
- Central institution membership: 1958–1989: Full member, Central Committee; 1954–1958: Candidate member, Central Committee; Other offices held: 1973–1989: Deputy Minister, Ministry for Foreign Affairs; 1969–1973: State Secretary, Ministry for Foreign Affairs; 1949–1950: Deputy Head, International Relations Department of the Central Committee

Peter Florin (2 October 1921 – 17 February 2014) was an East German politician and diplomat.

== Early life ==
Florin was born in Cologne on 2 October 1921.

His father, Wilhelm Florin (1894–1944), was a leading figure in the pre-war Communist Party of Germany. and, between 1924 and 1933, a member of the Reichstag (national parliament).

Florin left Germany with his parents in 1933, when Adolf Hitler came to power and began persecuting Communists, moving first to France and then to the Soviet Union, where he attended the Karl Liebknecht School. There, he studied chemistry at the D. Mendeleev University of Chemical Technology.

During the Second World War, he fought with the Soviet partisans in Belarus. In 1944, Florin became editor of Freies Deutschland, a weekly anti-Nazi newspaper. At the end of the war, he returned to Germany as a member of the Ackermann Group, one of the regional groups sent to lay the groundwork for the Soviet Military Administration in Germany.

== Career ==
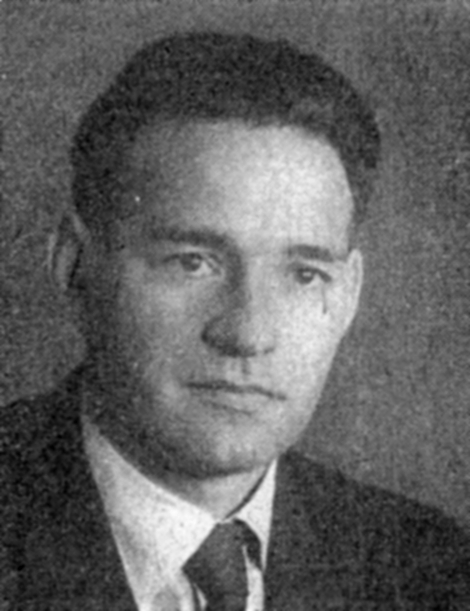
Florin's official Volkskammer portrait, 1954

Following the war, Florin entered politics in the German Democratic Republic and served as vice-president of the regional parliament of Wittenberg, while working as chief editor of the daily newspaper Freiheit. Then, from 1949 to 1952, he was an advisor for the East German ministry of foreign affairs. In 1953, he was promoted to the head of the Department for International Relations of the Socialist Unity Party of Germany's central committee. From 1954 to 1971, he was a member of the country's parliamentary committee on foreign affairs, which he presided over for a time.

From 1967 to 1969, Florin was East Germany's ambassador to Czechoslovakia. He supported the Soviet crushing of the Prague Spring uprising in 1968. In 1969, he was named secretary of state and first deputy foreign minister.

From 1973 to 1982, Florin was the German Democratic Republic's permanent representative to the United Nations. In 1982, he became president of the national commission for UNESCO in East Germany. In 1987 and 1988, he presided over the forty-second session of the United Nations General Assembly.

== Personal life ==
Peter Florin was married, and had three children. His wife Edel was, in the late 1980s, a professor of Russian literature at Humboldt University in East Berlin.

Florin spoke fluent German, Russian and English, and good French. During his presidency of the United Nations General Assembly, he was, according to the New York Times, "nicknamed 'Comrade Glasnost' by delegates, who s[aw] him as him a symbol of the modern Communist of the Gorbachev era."

He died on 17 February 2014, aged 92.

Diplomatic posts
Preceded by Humayun Rashid Choudhury	President of the United Nations General Assembly; 1987–1988	Succeeded by Dante Caputo
