= Herbert Krolikowski =

German politician and diplomat

- Born: 15 March 1924; Oels, Province of Lower Silesia, Germany
- Died: 28 November 2012 (aged 88); Berlin, Germany
- Occupations: Politician; Diplomat
- Political party: SED

Herbert Krolikowski (15 March 1924 – 28 November 2012) was an East German diplomat and politician. At various stages he was a government minister and his country's ambassador to Czechoslovakia. Because of the way power in the German Democratic Republic was concentrated on the ruling Socialist Unity Party of Germany (SED / Sozialistische Einheitspartei Deutschlands), Herbert Krolikowski's most important appointment almost certainly came in 1976 when he became one of the 145 members of the Central Committee of the SED (party).

== Life ==
Herbert Krolikowski was born into a working-class family in a small industrial town near Breslau (as it was then known) in Lower Silesia, some four years before the birth of his brother Werner Krolikowski. He undertook a commercial apprenticeship and was in 1942 enrolled for Labour service which at this time meant joining the army. In 1945 he became a Soviet prisoner of war: while in captivity he attended an "Anti-fascist School".

In November 1949 he was released to the newly founded German Democratic Republic, which till the previous month had still been designated the Soviet occupation zone in what remained of Germany. He obtained a clerical job with a Co-op in Malchin. In addition, from March till August 1950 he served as First Secretary of the local Society for German–Soviet Friendship, also becoming an instructor and section head with the society's national head office in Berlin. In 1952/53 he served as personal assistant to the Society's national General Secretary, Gottfried Grünberg.

Although the German Democratic Republic had been founded only in October 1949, the basis for a return to one-party government within the Soviet occupation zone had been established back in April 1946 with the establishment of the Socialist Unity Party of Germany (SED / Sozialistische Einheitspartei Deutschlands). The creation of the party came about through a contentious merger in the area under Soviet Administration of the old Communist Party and the more moderately left-wing Social Democratic Party. The merger was in theory one of equals, but by the time the German Democratic Republic was formally founded in 1949 the positions of party influence and leadership were almost all held by men who, like Koenen, had been members of the Communist Party until 1946. Herbert Krolikowski joined what was by now the new country's ruling SED (party) in 1952. In 1954/55 he underwent a course of study at the Party Academy in Berlin.

Herbert Krolikowski joined his country's diplomatic service in 1955: till 1958 he served as an attaché and third secretary in the East German embassy in Moscow. From 1958 till 1960 he was an acting director and then in 1960/61 in charge for Europe Division 4 (i.e. Scandinavia) at the East German Ministry for Foreign Affairs. He undertook a course of correspondence study at the country's "Walter Ulbricht" Academy for Law and Political Sciences at Potsdam during 1956–58, giving rise to the award of a degree in 1959. From 1962/63 he moved to head up the ministerial department for Europe Division 1 (i.e. the Soviet Union) at the Foreign Ministry, being promoted in 1963 to the position of Deputy Foreign Minister.

A further period of training followed from 1967 till 1969 at the Soviet Diplomatic Academy, leading to a doctorate. Dr. Krolikowski then served as his country's ambassador to Czechoslovakia in succession to Peter Florin and in the aftermath of the 1968 Warsaw Pact invasion of that country. He held this important diplomatic appointment from August 1969 till October 1973. At the eighth Party Congress in June 1971, Herbert Krolikowski's was one of the 54 names on the candidate list for membership of the SED Central Committee, and in May 1976, at the ninth party congress, he became one of the (by now) 145 Central Committee members. He retained his Central Committee membership till the mass resignation of the party Central Committee in December 1989, which took place in the context of the events leading to Germany reunification in October 1990. In terms of government positions, he was reappointed Deputy Foreign minister in November 1973, following his return from the Prague job, and in January 1975 became Secretary of State and First Minister for Foreign affairs - effectively deputy Foreign Minister - in succession to Oskar Fischer (who now headed up the foreign ministry). Krolikowski and Fischer both remained in post until 1990 and the final chapter in the forty-year existence of the German Democratic Republic.

In April 1986 he was chosen for the position of Secretary General at the regular meeting of the Warsaw Pact Political Advisory Meeting for member states, held in Berlin. He handed over to the Polish Foreign Minister, Henryk Jaroszek in May 1987 ahead of the subsequent meeting.

== Awards and honours ==
- 1964 Patriotic Order of Merit in bronze
- 1977 Patriotic Order of Merit in gold
- 1984 Hero of Labour
- 1987 Banner of Labor 1st class
- 1989 Order of Karl Marx
