= Klaus Fuchs =

German-born British physicist and atomic spy (1911–1988)

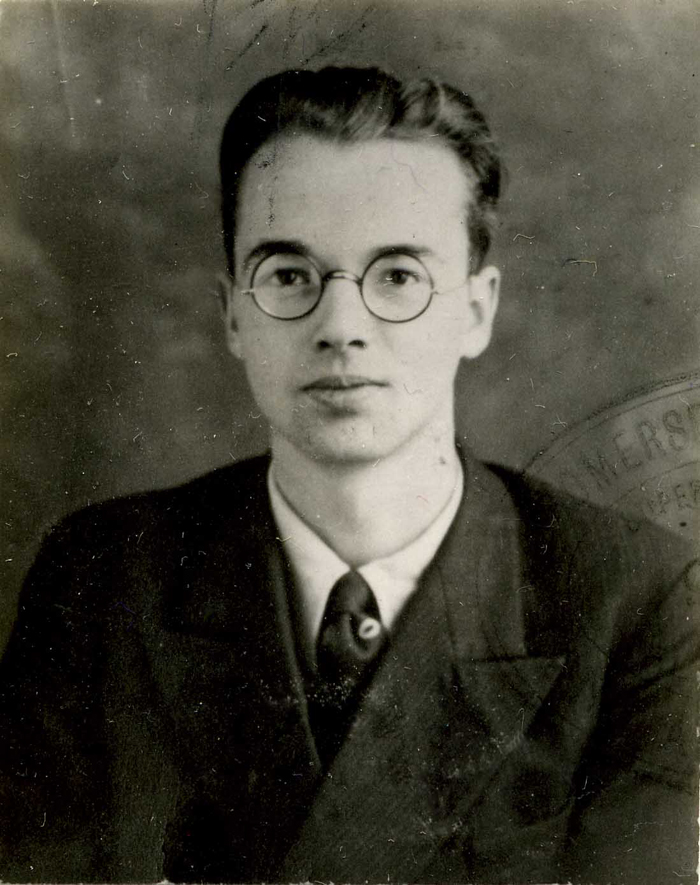
- Police photograph of Fuchs (c. 1940)
- Born: Klaus Emil Julius Fuchs; 29 December 1911; Rüsselsheim am Main, Grand Duchy of Hesse, German Empire
- Died: 28 January 1988 (aged 76); East Berlin, East Germany
- Citizenship: Germany; United Kingdom (1942–1951); German Democratic Republic
- Education: Leipzig University; Kiel University; University of Bristol; University of Edinburgh
- Spouse: Grete Keilson (m. 1959)
- Parents: Emil Fuchs (father); Else Wagner (mother)
- Scientific career
- Fields: Theoretical physics
- Workplaces: Los Alamos National Laboratory; Atomic Energy Research Establishment; Central Institute for Nuclear Physics
- Doctoral advisor: Nevill Francis Mott

Klaus Emil Julius Fuchs (29 December 1911 – 28 January 1988) was a German theoretical physicist, atomic spy, and communist who supplied information from the American, British, and Canadian Manhattan Project to the Soviet Union during and shortly after World War II. While at the Los Alamos Laboratory, Fuchs was responsible for many significant theoretical calculations relating to the first nuclear weapons and, later, early models of the hydrogen bomb. After his conviction in 1950, he served nine years in prison in the United Kingdom, then migrated to East Germany where he resumed his career as a physicist and scientific leader.

The son of a Lutheran pastor, Fuchs attended the University of Leipzig, where his father was a professor of theology, and became involved in student politics, joining the student branch of the Social Democratic Party of Germany (SPD), and the Reichsbanner Schwarz-Rot-Gold, an SPD-allied paramilitary organisation. He was expelled from the SPD in 1932, and joined the Communist Party of Germany (KPD). He went into hiding after the 1933 Reichstag fire and the subsequent persecution of communists in Nazi Germany, and fled to the United Kingdom, where he received his PhD from the University of Bristol under the supervision of Nevill Francis Mott, and his DSc from the University of Edinburgh, where he worked as an assistant to Max Born.

After the Second World War broke out in Europe, he was interned in the Isle of Man, and later in Canada. After he returned to Britain in 1941, he became an assistant to Rudolf Peierls, working on "Tube Alloys"—the British atomic bomb project. He began passing information on the project to the Soviet Union through Ursula Kuczynski, codenamed "Sonya", a German communist and a major in Soviet military intelligence who had worked with Richard Sorge's spy ring in the Far East. In 1943, Fuchs and Peierls went to Columbia University, in New York City, to work on the Manhattan Project. In August 1944, Fuchs joined the Theoretical Physics Division at the Los Alamos Laboratory, working under Hans Bethe. His chief area of expertise was the problem of implosion, necessary for the development of the plutonium bomb. After the war, he returned to the UK and worked at the Atomic Energy Research Establishment at Harwell as head of the Theoretical Physics Division.

In January 1950, Fuchs confessed that he had passed information to the Soviets over a seven-year period beginning in 1942. A British court sentenced him to fourteen years' imprisonment and he was subsequently stripped of his British citizenship. He was released in 1959, after serving nine years, and migrated to the German Democratic Republic (East Germany), where he was elected to the Academy of Sciences and became a member of the Socialist Unity Party of Germany (SED) central committee. He was later appointed deputy director of the Central Institute for Nuclear Physics in Dresden, where he served until his retirement in 1979.

Post Cold War declassified information states that the Russians freely acknowledged that Fuchs gave them the fission bomb.

== Early life ==
Klaus Emil Julius Fuchs was born in Rüsselsheim, Grand Duchy of Hesse, on 29 December 1911, the third of four children of a Lutheran pastor, Emil Fuchs, and his wife Else Wagner. His father served in the army during World War I but later became a pacifist and a socialist, joining the Social Democratic Party of Germany (SPD) in 1912. He eventually became a Quaker. Fuchs had an older brother Gerhard, an older sister Elisabeth, and a younger sister, Kristel. The family moved to Eisenach, where Fuchs attended the Martin-Luther Gymnasium, and took his Abitur. At school, Fuchs and his siblings were taunted over his father's unpopular socialist political views, which they came to share. They became known as the "red foxes", Fuchs being the German word for fox.

Fuchs was left-handed, but was forced to write with his right hand.

Fuchs entered the University of Leipzig in 1930, where his father was a professor of theology. He became involved in student politics, joining the student branch of the SPD, a party that his father had joined in 1921, and the Reichsbanner Schwarz-Rot-Gold, the party's paramilitary organisation. His father took up a new position as professor of religion at the Pedagogical Academy in Kiel, and in the autumn Fuchs transferred to the University of Kiel, which his brother Gerhard and sister Elisabeth also attended. Fuchs continued his studies in mathematics and physics at the university. In October 1931, his mother committed suicide by drinking hydrochloric acid. The family later discovered that his maternal grandmother had also taken her own life.

In the March 1932 German presidential election, the SPD supported Paul von Hindenburg for President, fearing that a split vote would hand the job to the Nazi Party (NSDAP) candidate, Adolf Hitler. However, when the Communist Party of Germany (KPD) ran its own candidate, Ernst Thälmann, Fuchs offered to speak for him, and was expelled from the SPD. That year Fuchs and all three of his siblings joined the KPD. Fuchs and his brother Gerhard were active speakers at public meetings, and occasionally attempted to disrupt NSDAP gatherings. At one such gathering, Fuchs was beaten up and thrown into a river.

When Hitler became Chancellor of Germany in January 1933, Fuchs decided to leave Kiel, where the NSDAP was particularly strong and he was a well-known KPD member. He enrolled at the Kaiser Wilhelm Institute for Physics in Berlin. On 28 February, while on a train to Berlin for a secret KPD meeting, he read a newspaper article on the Reichstag fire. Fuchs correctly assumed that opposition parties would be blamed for the fire, and surreptitiously removed his hammer and sickle lapel pin. Fellow party members urged him to continue his studies in another country. He went into hiding for five months in the apartment of a fellow party member. In August 1933, he attended an anti-fascist conference in Paris chaired by Henri Barbusse, where he met an English couple, Ronald and Jessie Gunn, who invited him to stay with them in Clapton, Somerset. He was expelled from the Kaiser Wilhelm Institute in October 1933.

== Refugee in Britain ==
Fuchs arrived in England on 24 September 1933. Jessie Gunn, as member of the Wills family, the heirs to Imperial Tobacco and benefactors of the University of Bristol, arranged for Fuchs to meet Nevill Francis Mott, Bristol's professor of physics, and he agreed to take Fuchs on as a research assistant. Fuchs earned his PhD in physics there in 1937. A paper on "A Quantum Mechanical Calculation of the Elastic Constants of Monovalent Metals" was published in the Proceedings of the Royal Society in 1936.

By this time, Mott had a number of German refugees working for him, and lacked positions for them all. He did not think that Fuchs would make much of a teacher, so he arranged a research post for Fuchs, at the University of Edinburgh working under Max Born, who was himself a German refugee. Fuchs published papers with Born on "The Statistical Mechanics of Condensing Systems" and "On Fluctuations in Electromagnetic radiation" in the Proceedings of the Royal Society. He also received a Doctorate in Science degree from Edinburgh. Fuchs proudly posted copies back to his father, Emil, in Germany.

In Germany, Emil had been dismissed from his academic post, and, disillusioned with the Lutheran Church's support of the NSDAP, had become a Quaker in 1933. He was arrested for speaking out against the government and was held for a month. His daughter, Elisabeth, married a fellow communist, Gustav Kittowski, with whom she had a child they named Klaus. Elisabeth and Kittowski were arrested in 1933, and sentenced to 18 months imprisonment but were freed at Christmas. Emil's son, Gerhard, and his wife Karin were arrested in 1934 and spent the next two years in prison. Gerhard, Karin, Elisabeth and Kittowski established a car rental agency in Berlin, which they used to smuggle Jews and opponents of the government out of Germany.

After Emil was arrested in 1933, his other daughter, Kristel, fled to Zurich, where she studied education and psychology at the University of Zurich. She returned to Berlin in 1934, where she too worked at the car rental agency. In 1936, Emil arranged with Quaker friends in the United States for Kristel to attend Swarthmore College there. She visited her brother, Klaus Fuchs, in England en route to America, where she eventually married an American communist, Robert Heineman, and settled in Cambridge, Massachusetts. She became a permanent resident in the United States in May 1938.

In 1936, Kittowski and Elisabeth were arrested again, and the rental cars were impounded. Gerhard and Karin fled to Czechoslovakia. Elisabeth was released and went to live with her father, Emil, while Kittowski, sentenced to six years, later escaped from prison and also made his way to Czechoslovakia. In August 1939, Elisabeth died by suicide by throwing herself off a bridge in the path of an oncoming train, leaving Emil to raise her young son, Klaus.

== Second World War ==
In August 1939, Fuchs applied to become a British subject, but his application had not been processed before the Second World War broke out in Europe in September 1939. There was a classification system for enemy aliens, but Born provided Fuchs with a reference that said that he had been a member of the SPD from 1930 to 1932, and an anti-Nazi. There matters stood until June 1940, when the police arrived and took Fuchs into custody. He was first interned on the Isle of Man. In July, he was sent to internment camps in Canada, first on the Plains of Abraham in Quebec City and later at a site near Sherbrooke, Quebec. During his internment in 1940, he continued to work and published four more papers with Born: The Mass Centre in Relativity, Reciprocity, Part II: Scalar Wave Functions, Reciprocity, Part III: Reciprocal Wave Functions and Reciprocity, Part IV: Spinor Wave Functions, and one by himself, On the Statistical Method in Nuclear Theory.

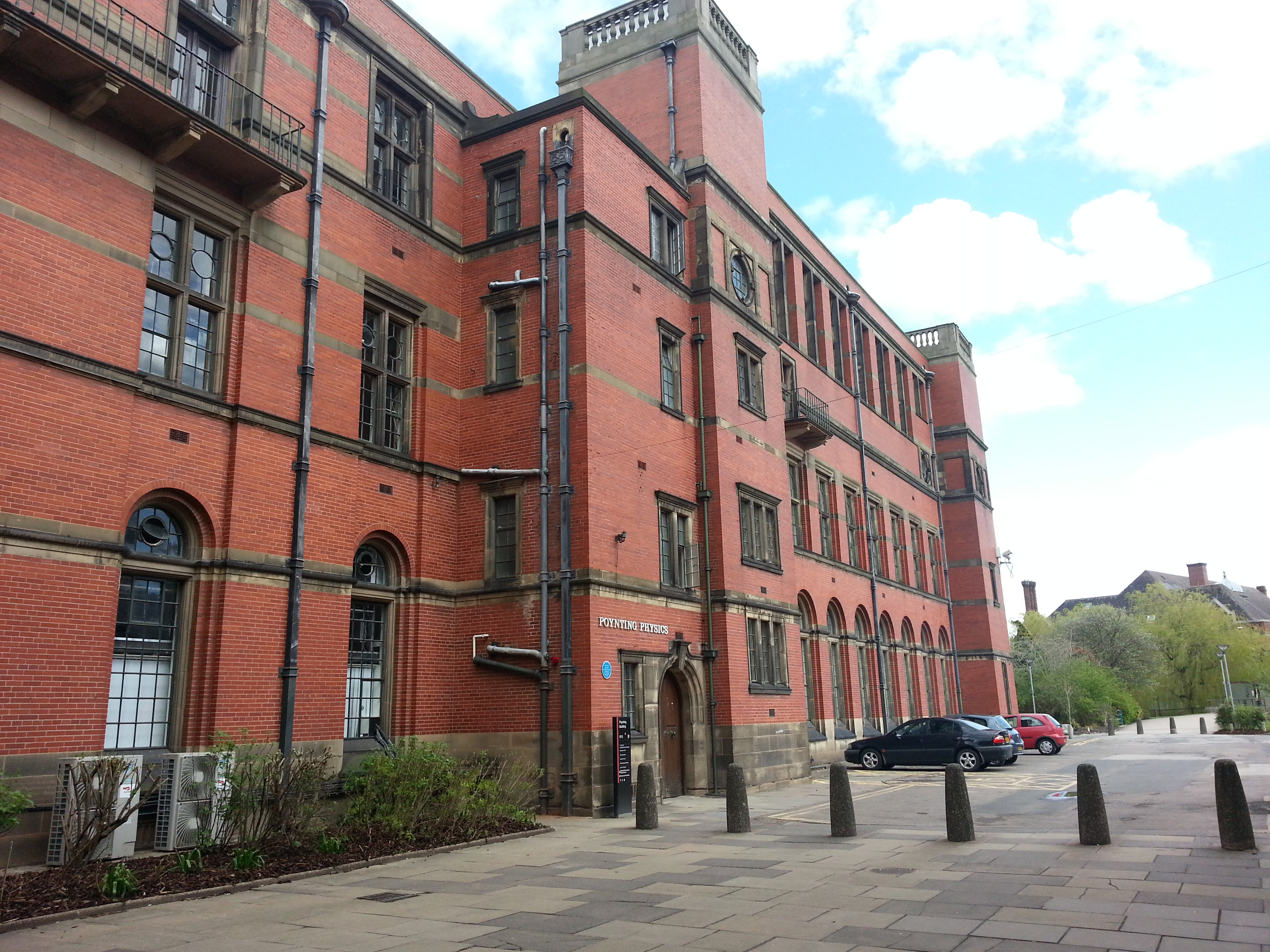
The Poynting Physics building at the University of Birmingham

While interned in Quebec, he joined a communist discussion group led by Hans Kahle. Kahle was a KPD member who had fought in the Spanish Civil War. After fleeing to Britain with his family, Kahle had helped Jürgen Kuczynski organise the KPD in Britain. Kristel arranged for mathematics professor Israel Halperin, the brother-in-law of a friend of hers, Wendell H. Furry, to send Fuchs some magazines, likely scientific journals. Max Born lobbied for his release. On Christmas Day 1940, Fuchs and Kahle were among the first group of internees to board a ship to return to Britain.

Fuchs returned to Edinburgh in January, and resumed working for Born. In May 1941, he was approached by Rudolf Peierls of the University of Birmingham to work on the "Tube Alloys" programme – the British atomic bomb research project. Despite wartime restrictions, he became a British subject on 31 July 1942 and signed an Official Secrets Act declaration form. As accommodation was scarce in wartime Birmingham, he stayed with Rudolf and Genia Peierls. Fuchs and Peierls did some important work together, which included a fundamental paper about isotope separation.

Soon after, Fuchs contacted Jürgen Kuczynski, who was now teaching at the London School of Economics. Kuczynski put him in contact with Simon Davidovitch Kremer (codename: "Alexander"; 1900-1991), the secretary to the military attaché at the Soviet Union's embassy, who worked for the GRU (Russian: Главное Разведывательное Управление, romanised: Glavnoye Razvedyvatel'noye Upravleniye), the Red Army's foreign military intelligence directorate. After three meetings, Fuchs was teamed up with a courier so he would not have to find excuses to travel to London. She was Ursula Kuczynski (codename: "Sonya"), the sister of Jürgen Kuczynski. She was a German communist, a major in Soviet Military Intelligence and an experienced agent who had worked with Richard Sorge's spy ring in the Far East.

In late 1943, Fuchs (codename: "Rest"; he became "Charles" in May 1944), transferred along with Peierls to Columbia University, in New York City, to work on gaseous diffusion as a means of uranium enrichment for the Manhattan Project. Although Fuchs was "an asset" of GRU in Britain, his "control" was transferred to the NKGB (Russian: Народный Kомиссариат Государственной Безопасности, romanised: Narodnyy Komissariat Gosudarstvennoy Bezopasnosti), the Soviet Union's civilian intelligence organisation, when he moved to New York. He spent Christmas 1943 with Kristel and her family in Cambridge. He was contacted by Harry Gold (codename: "Raymond"), an NKGB agent in early 1944.

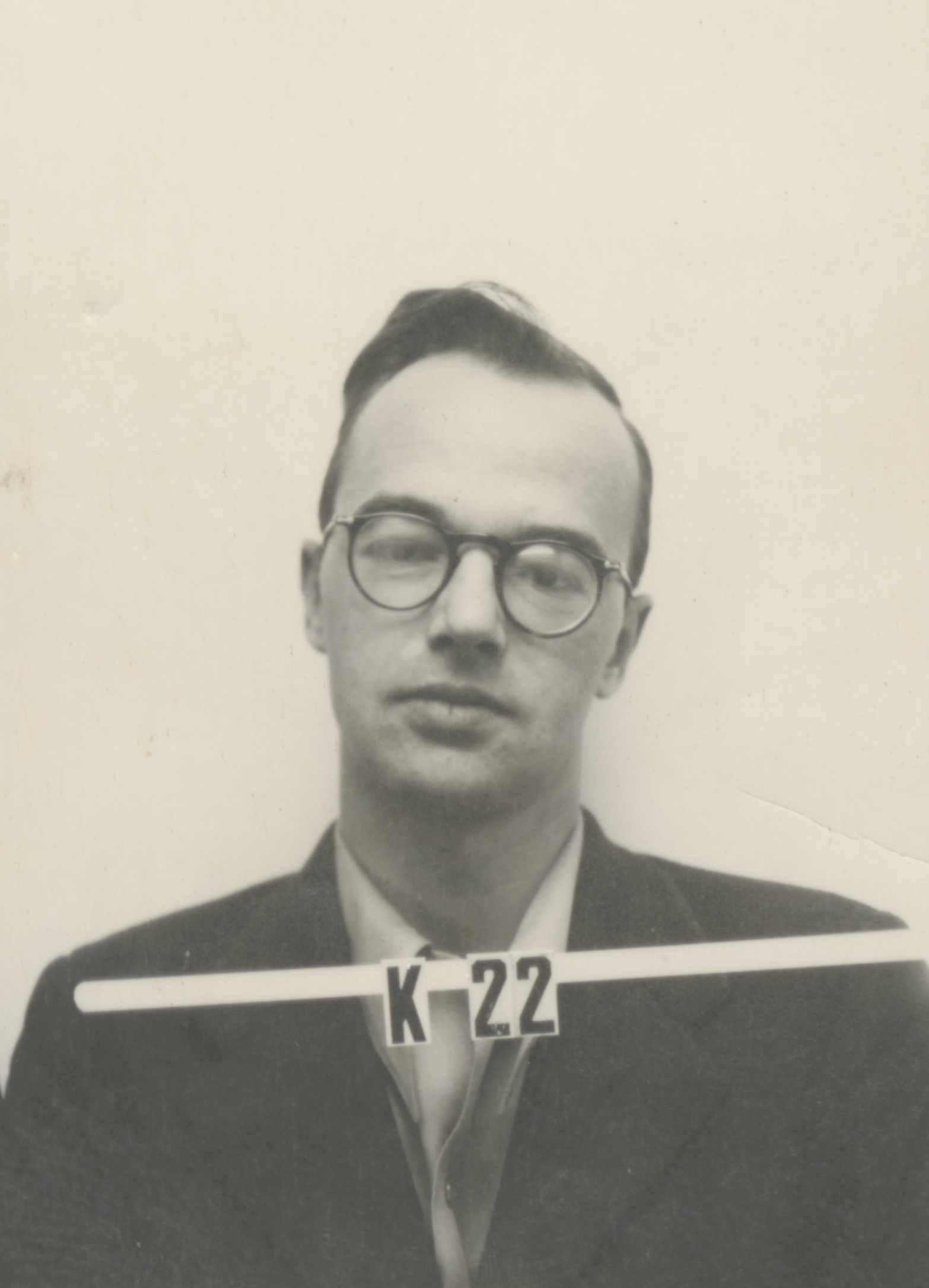
Fuchs's Los Alamos ID badge

From August 1944, Fuchs worked in the Theoretical Physics Division at the Los Alamos Laboratory, under Hans Bethe. His chief area of expertise was the problem of imploding the fissionable core of the plutonium bomb. At one point, Fuchs did calculation work that Edward Teller had refused to do because of lack of interest. He was the author of techniques (such as the still-used Fuchs–Nordheim method) for calculating the energy of a fissile assembly that goes highly prompt critical, and his report on blast waves is still considered a classic. Fuchs was one of the many Los Alamos scientists present at the Trinity test in July 1945.

Socially, Fuchs was later judged as someone who kept to himself, and never talked about politics. He was fairly well-liked. He dated grade school teachers Evelyn Kline and Jean Parker, and occasionally served as a babysitter for other scientists. He befriended Richard Feynman. Fuchs and Peierls were the only members of the British Mission to Los Alamos who owned cars, and Fuchs lent his Buick to Feynman so Feynman could visit his dying wife in a hospital in Albuquerque. When Fuchs was discovered to be a spy, his former colleagues were shocked. The postwar director of Los Alamos, Norris Bradbury, later said that:

Fuchs was a strange man. I knew him, though not well. A very popular, very reticent bachelor, who was welcome at parties because of his nice manners. He worked very hard; worked very hard for us, for this country. His trouble was that he worked very hard for Russia, too. Basically, he hated the Germans bitterly. He had an undying hatred and he simply thought this country was not working hard enough to assist the Russians to defeat the Germans. Well, he was in his own odd way loyal to the United States. He suffered from a double loyalty.

Fuchs's main courier in the United States was Harry Gold, a chemist who lived in Philadelphia, but was willing to travel to wherever Fuchs was. Allen Weinstein, the author of The Haunted Wood: Soviet Espionage in America (1999), has pointed out: "The NKVD had chosen Gold, an experienced group handler, as Fuchs's contact on the grounds that it was safer than having him meet directly with a Russian operative, but Semyon Semyonov was ultimately responsible for the Fuchs relationship."

Gold reported after his first meeting with Klaus Fuchs:

He (Fuchs) obviously worked with our people before and he is fully aware of what he is doing. … He is a mathematical physicist … most likely a very brilliant man to have such a position at his age (he looks about 30). We took a long walk after dinner. … He is a member of a British mission to the U.S. working under the direct control of the U.S. Army. … The work involves mainly separating the isotopes... and is being done thusly: The electronic method has been developed at Berkeley, California, and is being carried out at a place known only as Camp Y. … Simultaneously, the diffusion method is being tried here in the East. … Should the diffusion method prove successful, it will be used as a preliminary step in the separation, with the final work being done by the electronic method. They hope to have the electronic method ready early in 1945 and the diffusion method in July 1945, but (Fuchs) says the latter estimate is optimistic. (Fuchs) says there is much being withheld from the British. Even Niels Bohr, who is now in the country incognito as Nicholas Baker, has not been told everything.

After the end of the war, in April 1946, he attended a conference at Los Alamos that discussed the possibility of a thermonuclear weapon; one month later, he filed a patent with John von Neumann, describing a thermonuclear weapon design the two had collaborated on. Though it was not a viable design, it was the first instance of the idea of radiation implosion being part of a weapon design. Radiation implosion would later become a core part of the successful Teller–Ulam design for thermonuclear weapons, but its importance was not appreciated at the time. Bethe considered Fuchs "one of the most valuable men in my division" and "one of the best theoretical physicists we had".

== Post-war activities ==
At the request of Norris Bradbury, who had replaced Robert Oppenheimer as director of the Los Alamos Laboratory in October 1945, Fuchs stayed on at the laboratory into 1946 to help with preparations for the Operation Crossroads weapons tests. While US Atomic Energy Act of 1946 (McMahon Act) prohibited the transfer of information on nuclear research to any foreign country, including Britain, without explicit official authority, Fuchs, nevertheless, supplied highly classified U.S. information to nuclear scientists in Britain as well as his Soviet contacts.

As of 2014, British official files on Fuchs were still being withheld. As of 2020, the National Archives listed one dossier on Fuchs, KV 2/1263, including the "Prosecution file. With summary of early interrogations ... and details of the scientific/technical information passed to the Russians," which was released in 2003. According to an October 2020 book review, author Nancy Thorndike Greenspan "appears to have had access to some of the Fuchs files that have been withheld at Kew, such as the AB/1 [Tube Alloys] series, which has been closed for access for most human beings," although others are available to view onsite, or are available to download, such as KV 2/1263 and some AB 1 files.

Fuchs was highly regarded as a scientist by the British, who wanted him to return to the United Kingdom to work on Britain's postwar nuclear weapons programme. He returned in August 1946 and became the head of the Theoretical Physics Division at the Atomic Energy Research Establishment at Harwell. From late 1947 to May 1949 he gave Alexander Feklisov, his Soviet case officer, the principal theoretical outline for creating a hydrogen bomb and the initial drafts for its development as the work progressed in England and America. Meeting with Feklisov six times, he provided the results of the test at Eniwetok Atoll of uranium and plutonium bombs and the key data on production of uranium-235.

In 1947, Fuchs attended a conference of the Combined Policy Committee (CPC), which was created to facilitate exchange of atomic secrets at the highest levels of governments of the United States, United Kingdom and Canada. Donald Maclean, another Soviet spy, was also in attendance as British co-secretary of CPC.

== Detection and confession ==
By September 1949, information from the American Venona project indicated to GCHQ that Fuchs was a spy, but the British intelligence services were wary of indicating the source of their information. The Soviets had broken off contact with him in February. Fuchs may have been tipped off by Kim Philby. After a great deal of research for his 2019 biography, Trinity, Frank Close confirmed that while MI5 suspected Fuchs for over two years, "it was decrypters at GCHQ who supplied clear proof of his guilt ... not the crack American team that is normally given all the credit", according to a review of the book.

Under interrogation by MI5 officer William Skardon at an informal meeting in December 1949, Fuchs initially denied being a spy and was not detained. According to Nancy Thorndike Greenspan, author of a 2020 book, Atomic Spy: The Dark Lives of Klaus Fuchs, Skardon told Fuchs that if he admitted his earlier espionage activity, he could be permitted to continue to work at Harwell. In October 1949, Fuchs had approached Henry Arnold, the head of security at Harwell, with the news that his father had been given a chair at the University of Leipzig in East Germany, and this information became a factor as well. In early January Fuchs was informed that he must resign his position at Harwell because of his father's appointment in East Germany. He was offered help in finding a university post.

Meeting with Skardon for a fourth time on 24 January 1950, Fuchs voluntarily confessed that he had shared information with the Soviets. According to Nancy Thorndike Greenspan, Skardon's report on their meeting "made no mention of his promise to Fuchs to stay on at Harwell if he confessed", but at the subsequent debriefing it was agreed "to maintain FUCHS in his present state of mind, and for this state of mind to be in no way disturbed". To make it possible to prosecute Fuchs, Skardon proposed that Fuchs be asked to prepare a signed statement, which he then did at the War Office in London. The document included the statement "I was given the chance of admitting it and staying at Harwell or clearing out."

Three days later, he also directed a statement more technical in content to Michael Perrin, the deputy controller of atomic energy within the Ministry of Supply. Fuchs told interrogators that the NKGB had acquired an agent in Berkeley, California, who had informed the Soviet Union about electromagnetic separation research of uranium-235 in 1942 or earlier. Fuchs's statements to British and American intelligence agencies were used to implicate Harry Gold, a key witness in the trials of David Greenglass and Julius and Ethel Rosenberg in the United States. Fuchs later stated that he passed detailed information on the project to the Soviet Union through courier Harry Gold in 1945, and further information about Edward Teller's unworkable "Super" design for a hydrogen bomb in 1946 and 1947. Fuchs stated that "The last time when I handed over information [to Russian authorities] was in February or March 1949".

Fuchs was arrested on 2 February 1950, charged with violations of the Official Secrets Act. Nancy Thorndike Greenspan quotes from police notes on a visit between fellow scientist Peierls and Fuchs in detention shortly after the news of the arrest broke. When Peierls asked Fuchs why he had spied, Fuchs answered: "Knowledge of atomic research should not be the private property of any one country but should be shared with the rest of the world for the benefit of mankind."

== Value of data to Soviet project ==
Hans Bethe once said that Fuchs was the only physicist he knew to have truly changed history. Considering that the pace of the Soviet programme was set primarily by the amount of uranium that it could procure, it is difficult for scholars to counterfactually judge how much time or effort was saved. Prior to the opening up of the Soviet archives in the early 1990s, scholars and analysts tended to assume that the Soviets would have applied any technical intelligence as directly as possible.

Historical work after the end of the Cold War revealed that the head of the Soviet atomic project, Lavrenti Beria, did not entirely trust either his intelligence sources, nor his own scientists, and so instead used the intelligence information as a third-party check and guide, rather than exploiting it directly. Most of the scientists working on the Soviet bomb project were, accordingly, unaware that they were using any intelligence information as part of their research.

Because of these conditions, it is hard to evaluate whether Fuchs's information had an accelerating effect on the research, or if it even saved much effort, as the Soviets tended to re-do the research results independently anyway. And in many respects, the Soviet programme was not simply a recapitulation of the Manhattan Project: it explored several approaches that were not done during the war, such as the successful development of the gas centrifuge method of enrichment.

Fuchs's own assessment of the effects of his actions, as reflected in an interview with Perrin after his arrest, was he thought he could have saved the Soviets "several years" time ("one year at least") because they could have started the development of the weapon design so that it was ready by the time sufficient fissile material became available:

He stated that his best estimate is that the information furnished by him speeded up the production of an A-Bomb by Russia by several years because it permitted them to start on the development of the explosion [sic: explosive] and have this ready by the time the fissionable material was ready. He concluded that the Russian scientists are as good as scientists in England and the United States but there are fewer good scientists in Russia than the other two countries. He stated that he gave the Russians nothing that would speed up the production of plutonium and estimated that if he had given the same data which he gave the Russians to the United States as of the date of his arrival in the United States, he would have speeded the U.S. production of the A-Bomb only slightly. He did pass on to his Russian espionage contact what he learned concerning the production of plutonium during the final period of his work at Los Alamos. He stated that the information furnished by him alone could have speeded up the production of an A-Bomb by Russia by one year at least. He indicated that if the Russians had information on the plutonium process from any other source, the data furnished by him could have been of material assistance on this plutonium phase.

Fuchs was not told how the Soviets would or would not use his information, and though certain questions from his espionage contacts suggested to him that the Soviets had additional sources within the Manhattan Project, he was unaware of their identities and knowledge. He told Perrin that he was himself "extremely surprised" at the speed at which the Soviets developed their own atomic bomb, "as he had been convinced that the information he had given could not have been applied so quickly and that the Russians would not have had the engineering design and construction facilities that would be needed to build large production plants in such a short time."

The information that Fuchs was able to give the Soviet Union about the Manhattan Project was much more extensive, and much more technically precise, than that available from other, later-discovered atomic spies like David Greenglass or Theodore Hall. According to Fuchs's interview with Perrin after capture, among his other disclosures, he gave the Soviets:

- As much information as he had available about the development of the implosion bomb, a topic he worked on substantially in a technical capacity. This included its theory, dimensions, components, and the justification for it being worked on (the fact that reactor-bred plutonium cannot be used in a gun-type design, something that had caught the United States by surprise in mid-1944). This included a "a sketch of the bomb and its components, with important dimensions indicated", as well as detailed information about the "urchin" neutron source (initiator) of the plutonium bomb, on which he was credited as a key inventor.
- Information about the gaseous diffusion process for enriching uranium that he worked on.
- The critical masses for plutonium-239 and uranium-235, which had taken the United States considerable time to finalize and were important to all matters of weapons design and stockpile size. He also provided metallurgical information about the allotrope of plutonium used in the final weapon, and information about its stabilization through alloying with gallium.
- In June 1945, he informed them that the US was planning to test an atomic bomb that July, and where it would take place, and that it was intended to be used against Japan.
- The approximate rates of production of plutonium-239 and uranium-235 by the United States, as well as the amounts of material used in each bomb type, from which the Soviets could estimate the US nuclear stockpile size and growth—a key secret in the early Cold War.
- Information about ideas for future fission weapon designs, including the use of composite cores to more effectively use fissile material supplies.
- What information he knew about the state of the US hydrogen bomb interest and effort, which Fuchs characterized as being a "confused picture". This included information that was contained in a series of lectures given by Enrico Fermi in the fall of 1945 on the fundamental physics of the "Super", information about the then-secret inverse Compton effect, the basic idea of Teller's "Runaway Super", and detailed information about the bomb design he had developed with von Neumann. All of the information on the hydrogen bomb work was delivered after Fuchs had left the United States, in 1947, and only after being directly prompted for it by his contact.

Whether the information Fuchs passed relating to the hydrogen bomb would have been useful is still debated. Most scholars agree with Hans Bethe's 1952 assessment, which concluded that by the time Fuchs left the thermonuclear programme in mid-1946, too little was known about the mechanism of the hydrogen bomb for his information to be useful to the Soviet Union. Fuchs's knowledge and own work was in the context of the original, erroneous "Runaway Super" idea, which was not abandoned until early 1950 in the face of new calculations that showed it would not work. The United States only developed a new, successful approach—the Teller–Ulam design—in early 1951. Fuchs could not give away the secret of the hydrogen bomb, as neither he, nor anyone else, knew it prior to his arrest in 1950.

The Soviet hydrogen bomb work also investigated the "Runaway Super" idea, and also found it to be a dead-end. Their own independent reinvention of the Teller–Ulam principle was accomplished through a different approach than in the United States. The Soviet physicist German Goncharov has noted that while Fuchs's early work did not help Soviet efforts towards the hydrogen bomb, it was in retrospect closer to the right approach than any scientists (Soviet or American) recognised at the time. It contained in it the seed of the idea of radiation implosion, which turned out to be of great importance to the final design. In this way, Fuchs's work was a "precursor" of the Teller–Ulam design, but only recognisable as such after the fact, as it was still missing some of the key elements of it and done in the context of a fundamentally different weapon.

The revelation of Fuchs's espionage increased the rift between the United States and the United Kingdom on matters of atomic energy. Prior to it, the US and UK had been planning to collaborate more fully again on nuclear matters, something that had been put on hold after the passing of the Atomic Energy Act of 1946. "Whatever hopes had existed for a tightly-integrated programme with the British and Canadians died with the Fuchs revelation", as historians Richard G. Hewlett and Francis Duncan put it. The Anglo-American "Special Relationship" would ultimately be repaired by the mid-1950s.

== Trial and imprisonment ==
Fuchs was prosecuted by Sir Hartley Shawcross and was convicted on 1 March 1950 of four counts of breaking the Official Secrets Act by "communicating information to a potential enemy." Fuchs had entered guilty pleas, and his barrister Derek Curtis-Bennett limited his case to a general plea in mitigation on the grounds of his state of mind and desire to assist the Soviets in defeating the Nazis and winning the war. Fuchs consented to the advice not to raise the question of inducement in his decision to admit guilt.

After a trial lasting less than ninety minutes that was based on his confession, Lord Goddard sentenced Fuchs to fourteen years' imprisonment, the maximum for espionage. The judge argued that his crime could not have been considered treason (which was a capital crime), because the Soviet Union was classed as an ally at the time. On 21 February 1951, he was formally stripped of his British citizenship.

The head of the British H-bomb project, Sir William Penney, visited Fuchs in prison in 1952. While imprisoned, Fuchs was friendly with, and played chess with, the Irish Republican Army prisoner Seamus Murphy - but declined an invitation to join in Murphy's successful escape attempt.

Fuchs was released on 23 June 1959 after he had served nine years and four months of his sentence (as was then required in England where long-term prisoners were entitled by law to one third off for good behaviour in prison) at Wakefield Prison and promptly emigrated to the German Democratic Republic (GDR).

== Career in East Germany ==
On arrival at Berlin Schönefeld Airport in the GDR, Fuchs was met by Margarete "Grete" Keilson, a friend from his years as a student communist. They were married on 9 September 1959.

In the GDR, Fuchs continued his scientific career and achieved considerable prominence as a leader of research. He became a member of the SED central committee in 1967, and in 1972 was elected to the Academy of Sciences where from 1974 to 1978 he was the head of the research area of physics, nuclear and materials science; he was then appointed deputy director of the Central Institute for Nuclear Physics in Rossendorf, Dresden, where he served until he retired in 1979. From 1984, Fuchs was head of the scientific councils for energetic basic research and for fundamentals of microelectronics. He received the Patriotic Order of Merit, the Order of Karl Marx and the National Prize of East Germany.

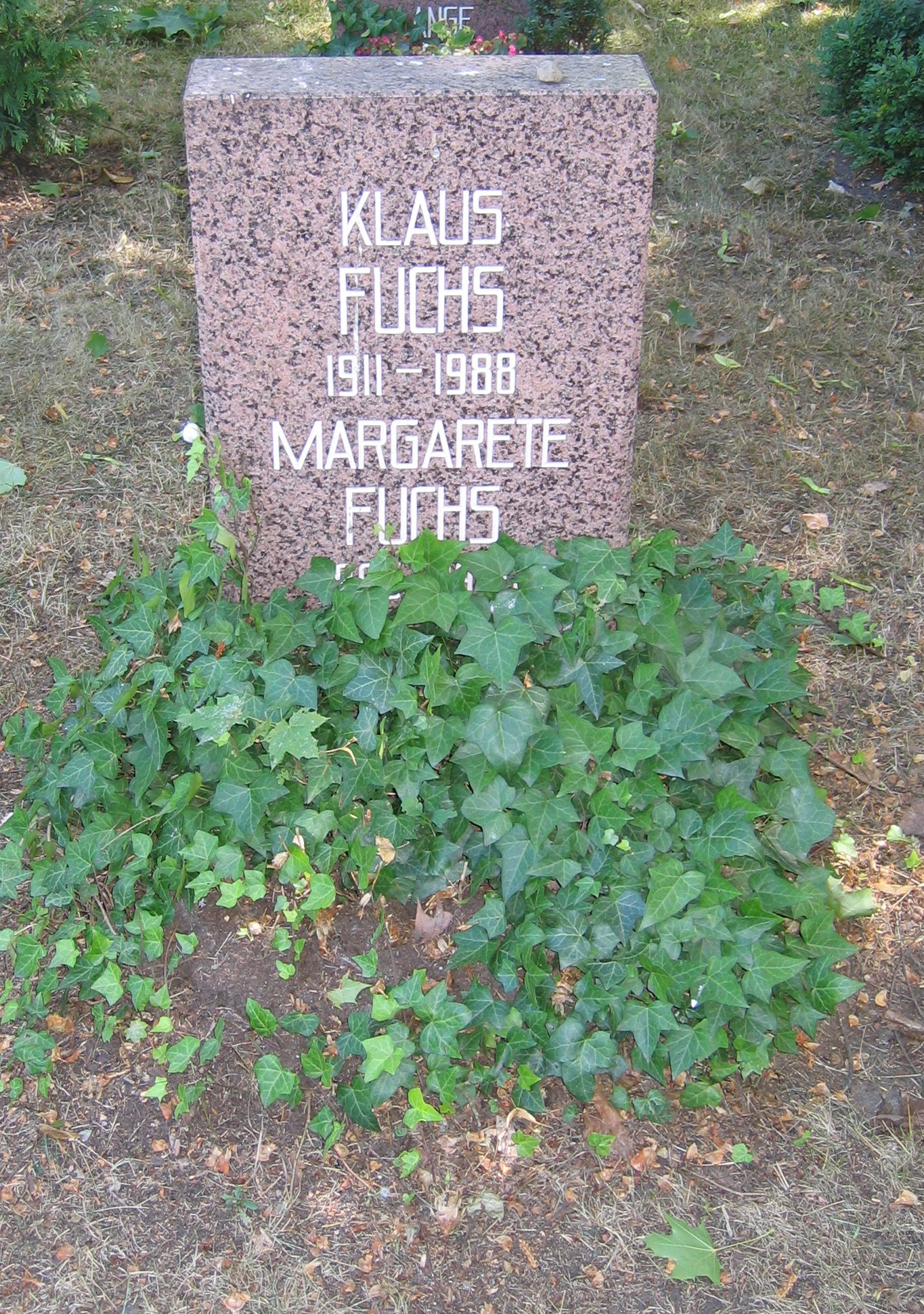
The grave of Klaus Fuchs and his wife Margarete in Berlin

In The Nuclear Express: A Political History of the Bomb and Its Proliferation (2009) by Thomas Reed and Daniel Stillman, it is argued that a tutorial Fuchs gave to Qian Sanqiang and other Chinese physicists helped them to develop the first Chinese atomic bomb, the 596, which was tested five years later. Three historians of nuclear weapons history, Robert S. Norris, Jeremy Bernstein, and Peter D. Zimmerman, challenged this particular assertion as "unsubstantiated conjecture" and asserted that The Nuclear Express is "an ambitious but deeply flawed book".

== Death ==
Fuchs died in East Berlin on 28 January 1988. He was cremated and honoured with burial in the Pergolenweg Ehrengrab section of Berlin's Friedrichsfelde Cemetery.

== In popular culture ==
Fuchs was portrayed by Denis Forest in the 1987 television miniseries Race for the Bomb. He was portrayed by American actor Christopher Denham in the 2023 film Oppenheimer.

A documentary film about Fuchs, Väter der tausend Sonnen (Fathers of a Thousand Suns), was released in 1990. In 2022, he was the primary focus of the second season of the BBC World Service's podcast The Bomb.

Dark Sun (1995) by Richard Rhodes features a clerihew about Fuchs:

Fuchs
Looks
Like an ascetic
Theoretic
