= Georg Fritze =

German pastor, theologian and anti-fascist, born 1874

- Born: 1 August 1874; Magdeburg, German Empire
- Died: 3 January 1939 (aged 64); Cologne, Nazi Germany
- Education: Martin Luther University of Halle-Wittenberg, University of Marburg
- Notable work: "Carthusian parish leaves", "The Church and Social Democracy"
- Title: Pastor; Theologian
- Spouse: Katharina "Cato" Havelaar
- Children: Klaus; Dorothée; Berta; Ulrich
- Theological work
- Era: Christianity in the 20th century
- Tradition or movement: Neo-Orthodoxy, Liberal theology

Georg Fritze (1 August 1874 – 3 January 1939) was a German theologian, Protestant pastor, religious socialist and anti-fascist.

== Career ==
Fritze studied Evangelical Theology in Halle (Saale) and Marburg. He sat his first theological exam in the Martin Luther University of Halle-Wittenberg in 1896, and his second exam in the University of Marburg in 1898. He then did military service from 1889 to 1890. He became an assistant preacher, and later "second pastor" in the Belgian Mission Church in Charleroi, where he ordained on 30 September 1900. After four years he returned to the Prussian Provincial Church in Saxony, where he made up the vicariate. After a year he was elected as a pastor in the parish of Nordhausen. In 1905 he married Katharina Havelaer from Haarlem in the Netherlands; together, they had four children.

In April 1916, Fritze took up the parish position in the Trinitatiskirche in Cologne. On 15 and 19 January 1919 he spoke in the Cologne Gürzenichsaal to a full crowd about the then unusual topic of "The Church and Social Democracy". Georg Fritze called for an end to the church's opposition to the labour movement and at the same time criticized the Social Democratic Party of Germany concerning its contemporary hostility to religion. As a result, a group of active religious workers became Fritze's dedicated followers. Fritze thus was a follower of Christoph Blumhardt, who had to give up his pastorship in 1899. Along with Erwin Eckert and Emil Fuchs, they were the first pastors in Germany who became widely recognized as socialists.

In September 1919 Georg Fritze traveled to the Tambach meeting of Protestant theologians (which also gave rise to the so-called dialectical theology of the 1920s) and met Karl Barth, who, like Fritze, was one of the few prominent Protestant pastors, until he was later expelled from Germany. However, Fritze remained more of a liberal theologian. Fritze only turned to dialectical theology, and in particular the ideology of Karl Barth, in the early 1930s, after Barth became active in Bonn, which was very close to Fritze's home in Cologne.

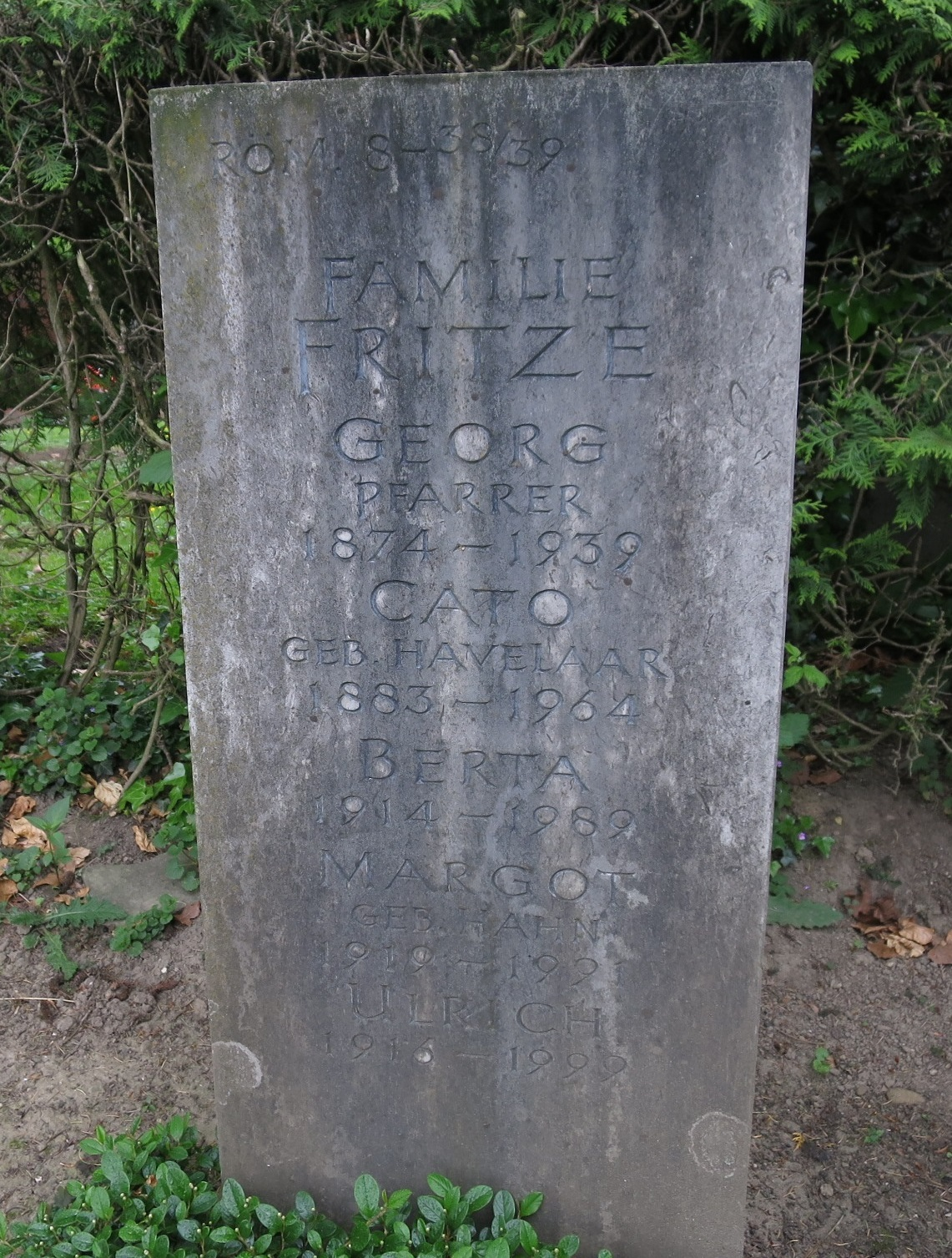
The family grave of Georg Fritze, located in Cologne's South Cemetery (hall 71).

During the 1920s, Fritze also campaigned for the ordination of women; at least four women completed his time as vicars with him, which was unusual at the time. In 1928 Georg Fritze became the first pastor in the restored Carthusian church in Cologne . In the "Carthusian parish leaves" he repeatedly warned of fascism . In December 1930, he and his colleagues from the Association of Religious Socialists in Cologne discussed the issue of violence in the resistance against National Socialism. They were already afraid of "possibly impending struggles" and discussed whether they could be countered in a non-violent manner in principle, or whether violent conflicts should be expected and one should prepare for them.

From 1933, the growing number of so-called German Christians in Cologne communities exacerbated the conflicts. Fritze participated in the founding of the Confessing Community, which tried to evade the National Socialist appropriation of the church, but beyond that it did not have a significant anti-fascist effect. Finally, representatives of the Confessing Church also advised Fritze to distance himself from socialism and to bow to Nazi demands. In 1938 Fritze was asked to take an oath of allegiance to Adolf Hitler. His refusal was used as an excuse to remove him from the pastorate on 17 October 1938.

After intense debates, Georg Fritze's health was severely impaired. On 3 January 1939 he died after a stroke and heart failure. Three days later he was buried in Cologne's South Cemetery.

== Legacy ==
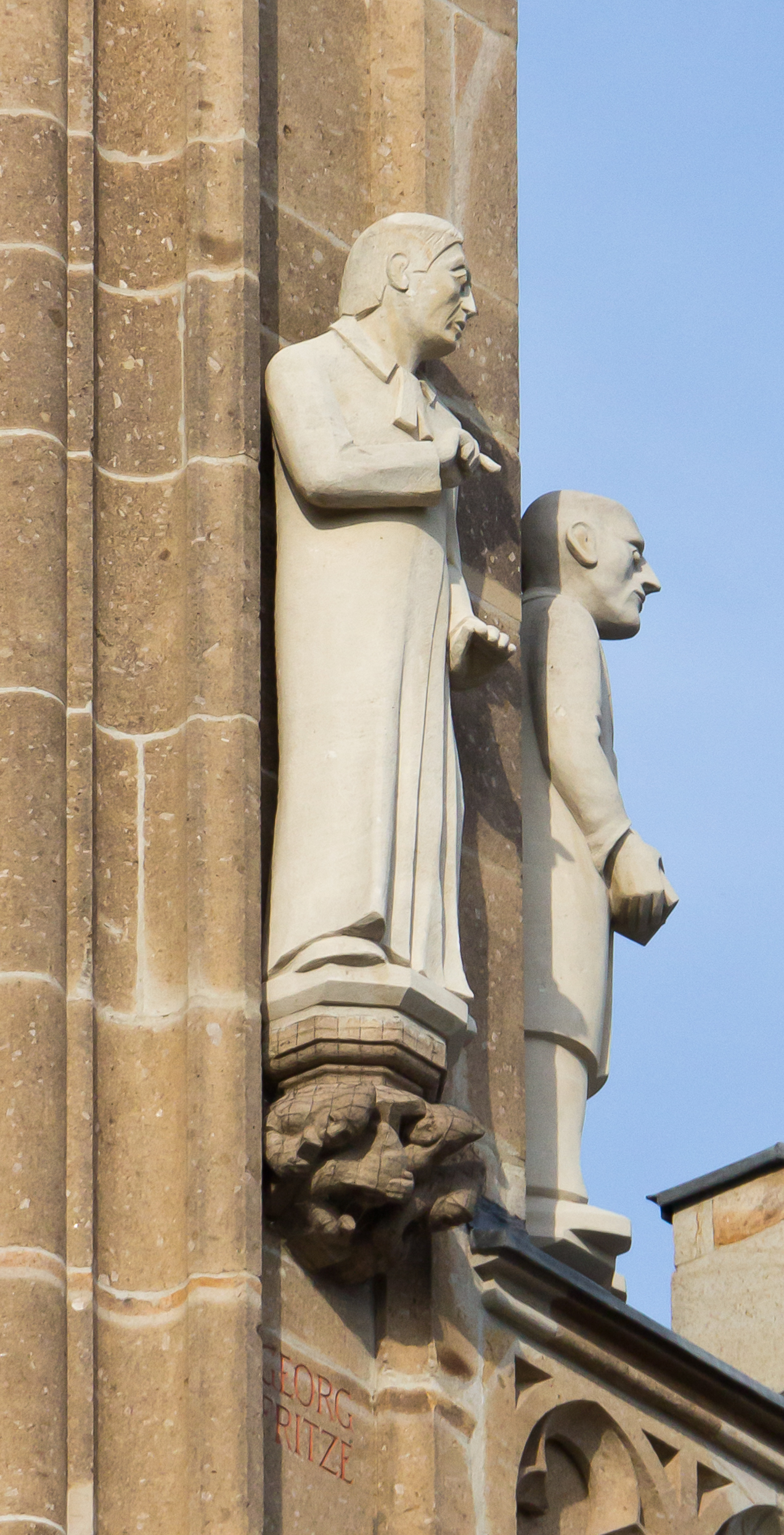
Figure of Georg Fritze on the tower of Cologne City Hall.

In 1980 there was a public apology on the part of the church, issued by the Cologne City Church Association. In 1981, a commemorative plaque for Georg Fritze was installed in the inner courtyard of the Kartäuserkirche, designed by the Cologne artist and architect Rudolf Alfons Scholl. Since the same year, the church district of Cologne-Mitte has been giving the Georg Fritze commemorative gift every two years to “people and groups who work for the victims of dictatorship and violence”.

In Cologne-Seeberg, a side street to Karl-Marx-Allee was called Georg-Fritze-Weg. In 1992 the Evangelical Community donated a Georg Fritze statue by the sculptor Joachim G. Droll for the tower of the Cologne town hall.
