= Werner Krolikowski =

German politician

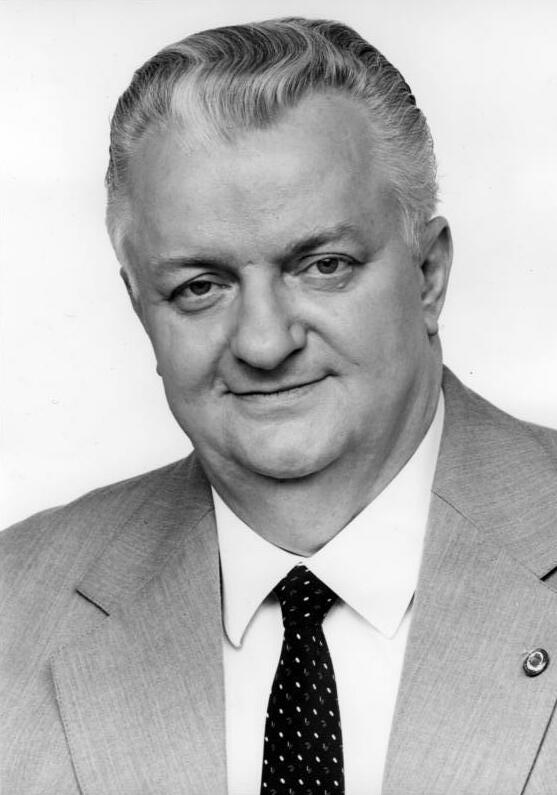
- Krolikowski in 1985

Secretary for Agriculture of the Central Committee Secretariat
- In office 4 November 1988 – 8 November 1989
- General Secretary: Erich Honecker
- Preceded by: Werner Felfe
- Succeeded by: Johannes Chemnitzer

First Deputy Chairman of the Council of Ministers
- In office 1 November 1976 – 4 November 1988 Serving with Alfred Neumann
- Chairman: Willi Stoph
- Preceded by: Günter Mittag
- Succeeded by: Günther Kleiber

Secretary for the Economy of the Central Committee Secretariat
- In office 2 October 1973 – 22 May 1976
- General Secretary: Erich Honecker
- Preceded by: Günter Mittag
- Succeeded by: Günter Mittag

First Secretary of the Socialist Unity Party in Bezirk Dresden
- In office May 1960 – 3 October 1973
- Second Secretary: Werner Eidner; Lothar Stammnitz
- Preceded by: Fritz Reuter
- Succeeded by: Hans Modrow
Volkskammer
Member of the Volkskammer for Brandenburg-Stadt, Brandenburg-Land, Belzig, Rathenow (Magdeburg; 1963-1986)
In office 14 November 1963 – 16 November 1989
Preceded by	multi-member district
Succeeded by	Gudrun Spelly

Personal details
- Born: Werner Krolikowski; 12 March 1928 Oels, Province of Lower Silesia, Free State of Prussia, Weimar Republic (now Oleśnica, Poland)
- Died: 27 November 2016 (aged 88)
- Party: Socialist Unity Party (1946–1989)
- Occupation: Politician; Party Functionary; Civil Servant
- Awards: Patriotic Order of Merit, 1st class; Order of Karl Marx
- Central institution membership: 1971–1989: Full member, Politburo of the Central Committee; 1963–1989: Full member, Central Committee; Other offices held: 1988–1989: Member, State Council; 1960: Second Secretary, Socialist Unity Party in Bezirk Rostock; 1958–1960: Secretary for Agitation and Propaganda, Socialist Unity Party in Bezirk Rostock; 1953–1958: First Secretary, Socialist Unity Party in Greifswald

Werner Krolikowski (12 March 1928 – 27 November 2016) was a German politician and high-ranking party functionary of the Socialist Unity Party (SED).

In the German Democratic Republic, he served as the First Secretary of the SED in Bezirk Dresden and was a member of the Politburo of the Central Committee of the SED. In the 1970s and in the late 1980s, he was a member of the Central Committee Secretariat, as powerful Economy and Agriculture Secretary respectively. Krolikowski, alongside Willi Stoph and Erich Mielke, was regarded as belonging to the pro-Moscow faction of the Politburo.

== Life ==
=== Early years ===
Werner Krolikowski was born into a working-class family on 12 March 1928. He trained for office work. By the time the war ended the frontier between Poland and Germany had moved west and Krolikowski, along with millions of other Germans, had also moved, the town of his birth now being part of Poland. In 1946 he joined the newly formed Socialist Unity Party of Germany (SED / Sozialistische Einheitspartei Deutschlands) in the Soviet occupation zone of what was left of Germany.

=== Party worker ===
He worked till 1950 for the council in the Malchin district, some 75 km (40 miles) south-east of Rostock, then from 1951 till 1952 for the regional party leadership at Mecklenburg. In 1952 he was appointed First Secretary of the party district leadership at Ribnitz-Damgarten on the north coast. Then, in December 1952, he was relieved of his functions "on account of gross breach of party rules".

Nevertheless, between 1953 and 1958 he was Second and then First Secretary to the party district leadership at Greifswald, then till 1960 he was secretary for Agitation and Propaganda for the party district leadership in the Rostock region in succession to Karl Zylla before, in 1973, moving to the other end of the country and taking a position as First Secretary of the Dresden district leadership, where his predecessor had been Fritz Reuter.

=== National politics ===
In 1963 Krolikowski became a member of the Party Central Committee, and in 1970 he became a member of the national People's Chamber ("Volkskammer"), where his responsibilities included membership of the assembly's National Defence Committee. In 1971 he joined the party politburo's central committee. Between 1973 and 1976 he was Secretary of the Party's Central Committee, and from 1976 right up till 1989 he was a member of the Economics Commission and of Central Committee Working Groups on the Balance of Payments and on inter-German Economic Relations. From 1976 till 1988 he was First Deputy Chairman of the German Democratic Republic's Ministerial Council. In 1988, following the sudden death of Werner Felfe (who had suffered the misfortune to be identified in western media as a possible successor to First Secretary Erich Honecker) Krolikowski regained the Central Committee secretaryship for agriculture.

=== Various reverses ===
In November 1989 The Wall came down. In November 1989 Werner Krolikowski resigned from his various public offices and on 3 December 1989 he was expelled from what had till very recently been the unchallenged ruling party in East Germany. An investigation was launched, based on "suspicions of abuse of office and corruption" ("Verdachts auf Amtsmißbrauch u. Korruption"). In May 1990 he was charged with "misappropriation of state funds" ("Veruntreuung von Staatsgeldern") and arrested before being released on bail. However, the case was dropped on health grounds.

== The ambassador's insight ==
The extent to which East Germany's leader Erich Honecker and his inner circle felt unsettled and undermined by on-going Perestroika in the Soviet Union became more widely known after Honecker himself had retired. The Soviet ambassador in East Berlin from 1983 till 1990 was a man called Vyacheslav Kochemasov, a diplomat whose experience of politics in Moscow and in East Berlin went back a long way. He gave an interview to the western press in 1992 in which he disclosed that as far back as 1986 Werner Krolikowski had told him, in confidence, that the situation in the SED Politburo had become "unbearable": policy decisions were totally driven by dogma, there was no longer any discussion, there was an absurd level of centralisation and an utterly implausible communications strategy. Something must be done: the leader must be replaced.

== Werner's brother ==
Werner Krolikowski's elder brother, Herbert Krolikowski (1924-2012) was also an East German politician of eminence. Herbert never rose quite as far as Werner, but he did serve as East Germany's deputy foreign minister between 1963 and 1967 and again between 1975 and 1990.

== Death ==
Krolikowski died on 27 November 2016, at the age of 88.

== Awards ==
- 1964 Patriotic Order of Merit
- 1970 Patriotic Order of Merit
- 1978 Order of Karl Marx
- 1980 Patriotic Order of Merit

After 1966 the "Patriotic Order of Merit", which Krolikowski received " ("for services to the people and the fatherland" ("Für Verdienste um Volk und Vaterland") was awarded at three different levels, designated respectively bronze, silver and gold, so that particularly long standing providers of exceptional service not infrequently won it more than once.

== Publications ==
- Zu einigen Fragen der Führungstätigkeit der Kreisleitungen der SED, Berlin 1972
- Der Kampf um die Verwirklichung der vom VIII. Parteitag beschlossenen Hauptaufgabe und die Bedeutung des wissenschaftlich-technischen Fortschritts, Berlin 1974
- Zu einigen Grundfragen der Wirtschaftspolitik der Sozialistischen Einheitspartei Deutschlands unter dem besonderen Blickpunkt der 13. Tagung des ZK der SED, Berlin 1975
- Für wachsende und wirksamere Solidaritätsleistungen, Berlin 1976
- Der IX. Parteitag der SED über die Fortsetzung des politischen Kurses der Hauptaufgabe. Die Einheit von Wirtschafts- und Sozialpolitik, Berlin 1976
- Die Intensivierung der gesellschaftlichen Produktion. Hauptweg der wirtschaftlichen Entwicklung der DDR, Leipzig 1977
- Die Verantwortung der sozialistischen Staatsmacht bei der Verwirklichung der Wirtschaftsstrategie des X. Parteitages der SED, Potsdam 1983
- DDR. Bollwerk des Sozialismus und Hort des Friedens, Potsdam 1984
- Je stärker der Sozialismus - desto sicherer der Frieden. Ausgewählte Reden und Aufsätze., Berlin 1988
