= Emil Fuchs (theologian) =

German theologian (1874–1971)

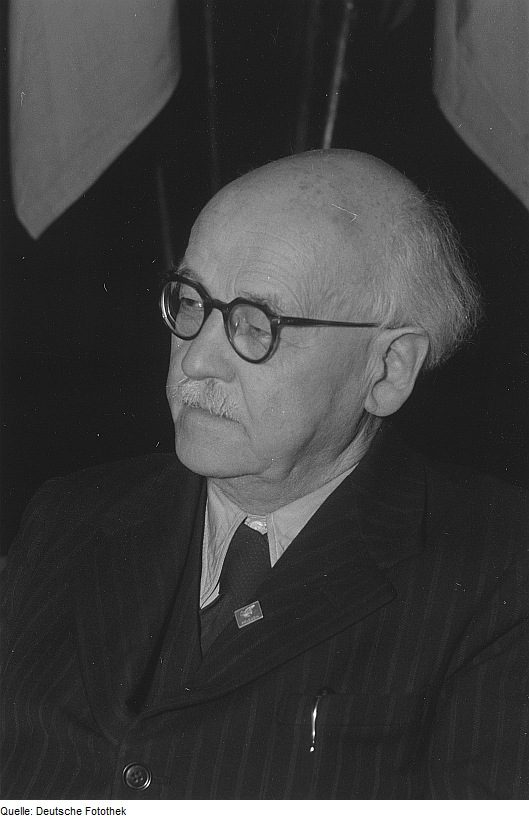
Emil Fuchs, 1952

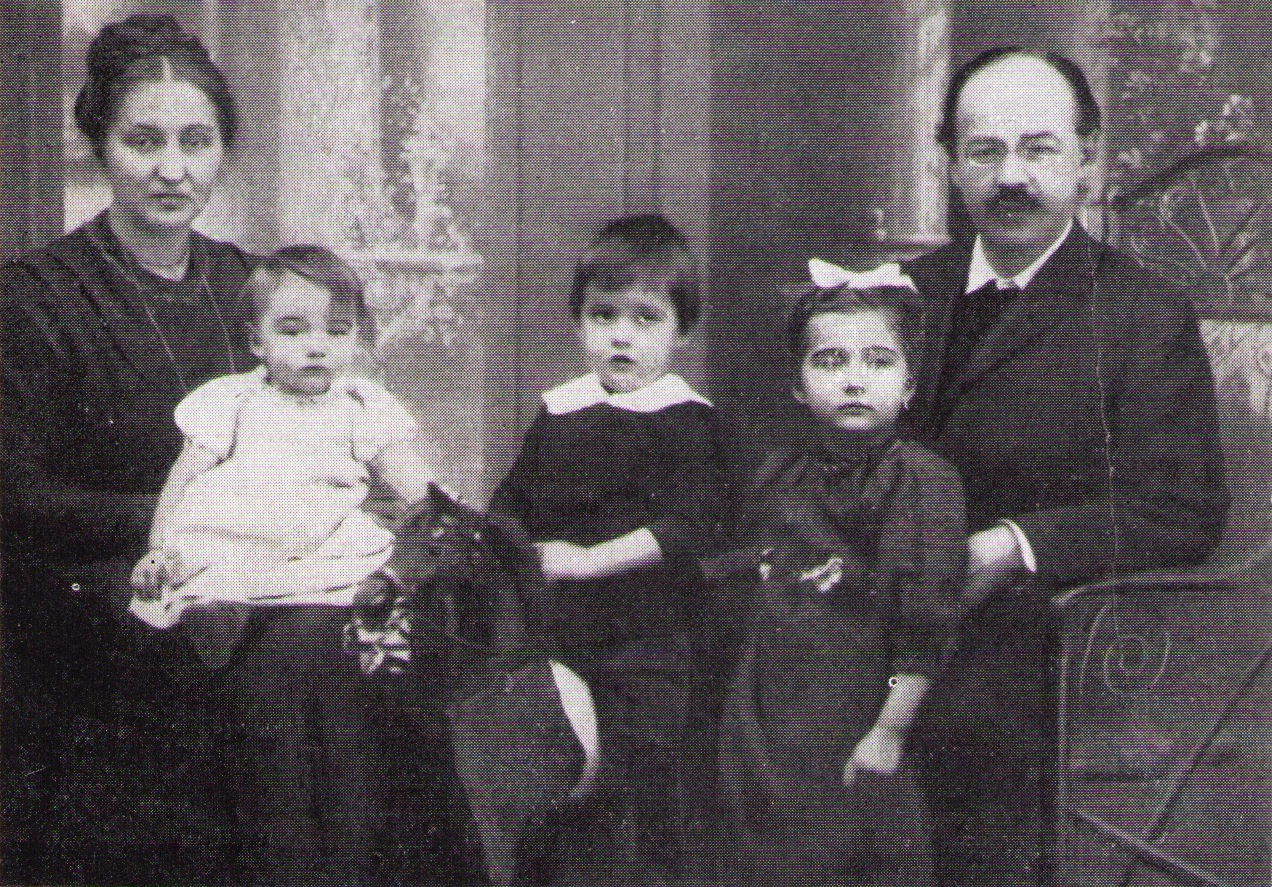
Fuchs in 1912 with his wife and three oldest children; Klaus is on his mother's lap.

Emil Fuchs (13 May 1874 – 13 February 1971) was a German theologian, the son of Georg Friedrich Fuchs and Auguste Louise Wilhelmine Lonni Hauss.

A religious socialist, Fuchs was one of the first Lutheran pastors to join the Social Democratic Party of Germany. As a devoted pacifist, he later joined the Religious Society of Friends (Quakers). He was a Fellowship holder at Woodbrooke College (now Woodbrooke Quaker Study Centre), Selly Oak, Birmingham from 1934 to 1935.

Fuchs was both a committed Christian and socialist and wrote numerous books on the relationship of Marxism and Christianity. In 1958 Fuchs became honorary member of the East German CDU, that was part of the East German government and pursued a pro-communist course. In February 1961 Fuchs was member of a Christian commission that was charged with discussing issues of state and church with the GDR leader Walter Ulbricht. Afterwards, Emil Fuchs engaged for normalisation of relations between the state and church in East Germany.

Though a loyal GDR supporter, Fuchs occasionally opposed the party line. He was against the persecution of the Young Congregations (Junge Gemeinden) in the 1950s. When conscription was introduced in East Germany, he managed to persuade the communist leadership to allow an alternative for military service. Men who refused usual service in the army could accordingly serve as 'construction soldiers', who did mostly construction work.

== Personal life ==
In 1906, Fuchs married Else Wagner (1875–1931), who later committed suicide. They had four children: Elisabeth (1908–1939, suicide), Gerhard (1909–1951), Klaus (1911–1988) and Kristel (1913–2008). His son Klaus Fuchs, a physicist, was an atomic spy, convicted of supplying information from British and American atomic bomb research to the USSR during, and shortly after, World War II.
