= Gregory Fritze =

American classical composer

Gregory Fritze (b. 1954) is a prize-winning American composer and Fulbright Scholar. His compositions have been performed more than a thousand times in 26 countries, and he has written over a hundred compositions for orchestra, band, chamber ensembles and soloists. He is a former chair of the Composition Department at the Berklee College of Music. Fritze has also been a performer with Boston Ballet, Rhode Island Philharmonic, and other orchestras.

== Accomplishments ==
Fulbright scholar to Spain.

Recipient of a Walt Disney Fellowship

Recipient of several composition awards from ASCAP

Awarded First Prize in T.U.B.A. composition contest.

Received 1996 composition award "Menzione d'Onore del Premio" from Accademia Angelica Constantiniana.

A Meet the Composer grant.

Winner of the 1998 IBLA Grand Prize in Composition by the European International Competition Ibla, Sicily.

He has Compositions performed nationally and internationally with recordings on Mark Records, Crystal Records, and CRI.

== Biography ==
Gregory Fritze was born in Allentown, Pennsylvania in 1954. Taking up the Tuba as his principal instrument, he received his bachelor's degree in Composition from the Boston Conservatory. At the Boston Conservatory he studied composition with John Adams and Tuba with Chester Roberts. He then went on to receive his master's degree in 1979 in Composition from Indiana University School of Music, where he studied Composition with Thomas Beversdorf, John Eaton and Fred Fox, while studying Tuba with Harvey Phillips. Fritze then went on to become Principal Tubist with the Rhode Island Philharmonic Orchestra, as well as a member of the Cambridge Symphonic Brass Ensemble, and Colonial Tuba Quartet.

In addition to composing over forty compositions for orchestra, band, chamber music and soloists. He has premiered many works for Tuba, several of which, written for him, such as the Concerto for Tuba and Band by John Bavicchi and the Concerto for Tuba and Jazz Ensemble by Ken Pullig. Fritze's compositions have been published by SeeSaw Music, Minuteman Music, TUBA Press and Musica Nova.

Fritze has served as a faculty member at the Berklee College of Music since 1979. While in attendance served as Conductor of the Berklle Concert Wind Ensemble from 1983–98. An advocate for new music, he began the annual Berklee student composition competition, which has produced hundreds of new compositions since its initiation in 1983.

In addition to his capacity as an educator, conductor, composer, and performer; Fritze has been a guest lecturer at many colleges, and festivals spanning from the United States, Canada, Japan and Europe. These include Convegno Bandistico Cantonale in Mendrisio, Switzerland, Sapporo Music Festival, Musicfest Canada Ottawa, Musicfest Canada Calgary, Musicfest Canada Winnipeg, Musicfest Canada Toronto, Musicfest Canada Vancouver, Massachusetts Instrumental Conductors Association, Rhode Island Music Educators Association, Pennsylvania Music Educators Association, American Band Association, The Mozart Festival, New York Brass Conference, New England Tuba Festivals, and Berklee College of Music High School Jazz Festivals.

== Compositions ==
Orchestra:

Wollaston Beach

Wheaton Overture

Prelude for Orchestra

Three Pieces for Orchestra

London Overture

A Day in Valencia

Waterplace Park

Wind Ensemble and Concert Band:

La Playa de Wólaston

Sinfonía de Valencia

Concertino for Euphonium and Band

Mare Nostrum Fanfare

Festival Overture

Jupiter Effect

Two Pieces for Concert Band

Invertebrate

A Day in Valencia

Flor de Azahar

Bocetos de Cullera

Variaciones Sinfónicas

Magallón Instrumento de Civilizaciones

Vadit Super Pozolum

Chamber:

The Broadway Limited

Prelude and Rondo

Kilimanjaro

Prelude and Dance

Salutation Fanfare

Basso Concertino

Pacman Gets Caught

Vertigo

Fantasia

Quintet for Brass Instruments

Piece for Trumpet Octet

Solo Music:

Sonata for Piano

Basso Concertino

Three Pieces for Solo Flutes

Yevrah Yad Thrib Bypah

Sonata

Six Pieces
