= Siegfried Reiprich =

German human rights activist and author (born 1955)

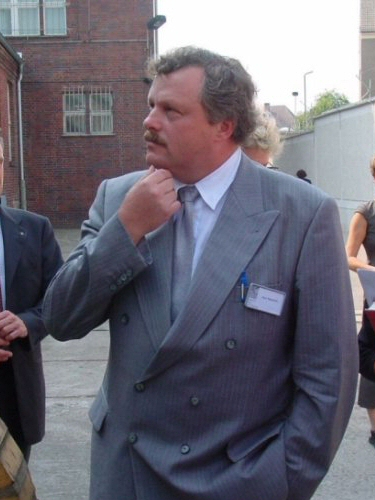
Siegfried Reiprich (2002)

Siegfried Reiprich (born 15 February 1955 in Jena) is a German human rights activist and author. He was involved in the resistance against the communist regime of the German Democratic Republic (GDR), which led to him being expelled from university and eventually banished from the GDR. In 2009, he was appointed by the Government of Saxony as the Director of the Stiftung Sächsische Gedenkstätten. In 2011, he was elected as a member of the Executive Board of the Platform of European Memory and Conscience.

In 1981, he was forced to leave East Germany and settled in West Berlin. He became active in the peace movement in West Germany and joined the SPD in 1983. In 1992, he left the SPD, and in 1998, he joined the CDU along with several other former human rights activists from East Germany.

== Publications ==
- Der verhinderte Dialog. Meine politische Exmatrikulation. Eine Dokumentation, Schriftenreihe des Robert-Havemann-Archivs, Berlin 1996, ISBN 978-3-9804920-2-7
- Die linke Opposition in der DDR als eigene Größe zwischen Prag 1968 und westeuropäischer Studentenrevolte, in: Geschichtswerkstatt Jena (Hg.): Linke Opposition in der DDR und undogmatische Linke in der BRD, Dokumentation einer Tagung von Friedrich-Ebert-Stiftung und Heinrich-Böll-Stiftung, Jena 1996, S. 37–54.
- Stasi in der Offensive - der 14. März 2006 in Berlin-Hohenschönhausen, in: Gerbergasse 18. Thüringer Vierteljahresschrift für Zeitgeschichte und Politik, Heft 41 (II/2006), , ISSN 1431-1607.
- Zu den Mechanismen ideologischer Disziplinierung an DDR-Universitäten, in: Deutscher Hochschulverband (Hg.): Zeitzeugen berichten. Wie die DDR die Universitäten unterdrückte, Forum des Hochschulverbandes Heft 67 (März 1999).
- Eroberung und Konsolidierung der Macht – zwei Phasen in der Geschichte der Stasi, in: Karsten Dümmel, Christian Schmitz (Hg.): Was war die Stasi? Einblicke in das Ministerium für Staatssicherheit der DDR (MfS), Sankt Augustin 2002, ISBN 3-933714-02-8.
- Aufbau Ost: Geld statt Geist, in: liberal 3/2004, , ISSN 0459-1992.
- Vakuum und nostalgische Legendenbildung. Vom Umgang mit der DDR-Geschichte an der Berliner Schule., in: Zeitschrift des Politisch-Akademischen Clubs e. V. Neue Folge Nr. 15 (75) 2006, ISSN 1433-4178.

== Literature ==
- Hildigund Neubert: Siegfried Reiprich, in: Veen, Hans-Joachim/Knabe, Hubertus/Neubert, Ehrhart/Wilke, Manfred u.a. (Hrsg.): Lexikon Opposition und Widerstand in der SED-Diktatur, Propyläen Verlag, Berlin 2000, ISBN 3-549-07125-6, S. 296.
- Freya Klier: Matthias Domaschk und der Jenaer Widerstand, Berlin 2007, , ISBN 978-3-00-021021-1.
- Udo Scheer: Kritisches oder oppositionelles Verhalten? Die Exmatrikulationen von Jürgen Fuchs, Siegfried Reiprich, Roland Jahn und Lutz Rathenow, in: AHF, Jahrbuch der Historischen Forschung 2005.
- Jürgen Fuchs (1991), "Landschaften der Lüge", Der Spiegel, 25 November 1991, no. 48, pp. 87–89
- Udo Scheer: Jürgen Fuchs. Ein literarischer Weg in die Opposition, Jaron Verlag, Berlin 2007, ISBN 3-89773-573-3.
- Udo Scheer: Vision und Wirklichkeit. Die Opposition in Jena in den siebziger und achtziger Jahren, Ch. Links Verlag, Berlin 1999, ISBN 3-86153-186-0.
- Baldur Haase: Mielke kontra Pegasus, LStU Thüringen, Erfurt 2001, ISBN 3-932303-32-6, S. 140–147.
- Jürgen Fuchs: Magdalena: MfS, Memfisblues, Stasi, Die Firma, VEB Horch & Guck – ein Roman. Rowohlt Verlag, Berlin 1998, ISBN 3-87134-051-0.
- Ehrhart Neubert: Geschichte der Opposition in der DDR 1949-1989, Ch. Links Verlag, Berlin 1997, ISBN 3-86153-163-1, S. 240f.
- Henning Pietzsch: Jugend zwischen Kirche und Staat. Geschichte der kirchlichen Jugendarbeit in Jena 1970-1989, Böhlau Verlag, Weimar 2005, ISBN 3-412-17204-9.
- Sandra Pingel-Schliemann: Zersetzen. Strategie einer Diktatur, Schriftenreihe des Robert-Havemann-Archivs, Berlin 2004, ISBN 3-9804920-7-9.
