= Evelyn Zupke =

German care and social worker

- Born: Evelyn Wiehler; 28 February 1962 (age 64); Binz, East Germany
- Occupations: Care and Social worker
- Known for: Democracy activist
- Children: 1

Evelyn Zupke (born Evelyn Wiehler; 28 February 1962) is a specialist care and social worker who came to prominence in the German Democratic Republic (East Germany) during the 1980s as a democracy activist.

She was a co-organiser of the project to uncover and publicise state mandated electoral fraud in the local government elections of 7 May 1989, which was a key step in the buildup to the Peaceful Revolution and prepared the way for reunification, formally in October 1990.

== Life ==
Evelyn Wiehler was born in Binz, the largest coastal resort on the East German island of Rügen. Her mother was a school teacher. In 1980 Evelyn successfully passed her school leaving exams (Abitur) which for most people would have opened the way to a university level education. When she was 18 she resigned from the FDJ, which was the youth wing of the country's ruling Socialist Unity Party (Sozialistische Einheitspartei Deutschlands / SED). By the time she left school she had been identified as a political non-conformist and a university level education was therefore not available to her. Instead she trained for work in the catering sector.

Rügen was a major holiday destination and she was able to work as a waitress and selling ice cream with the holiday service of the National Trades Union Federation. She resisted pressure to study for further qualifications since this would have necessitated becoming a member of the ruling SED (party). In 1984 she refused to take part in phony "Zettelfalten" local government elections, which led to further problems in her work.

She then switched sectors to work in the "Care of the mentally disabled", which in East Germany was organised partly under the auspices of the evangelical churches alliance diaconate. In 1987 she relocated to East Berlin. Her son Philipp was born iaround 1986. She now came into contact with the Weißensee Peace Circle ("Friedenskreis Weißensee"), one of the opposition groups emerging in East Germany in response to the changing political mood coming out of Moscow. By 1987 she was a member of the Weißensee Peace Circle.

For the local government elections held on 7 May 1989 a number of East German opposition groups co-ordinated their activities to evaluate the fairness of the process, through simple observation at the polling stations and counting. The implausibility of reported election results in East Germany was nothing new, but the mood of openness and the increase in citizen dissatisfaction with the system supported a move to identify and publicise what was done. Although observation and analysis took place across the country, the election monitoring undertaken by citizens in the Berlin quarter of Weißensee was particularly detailed, due in part to Evelyn Zupke's careful organisation of it and in part to the number of people participating in the exercise. In contrast to other towns and districts, in Weißensee there were observers at virtually every polling station. Of the 66 polling stations only one operated unobserved. This was the polling station at the prestigious Weißensee Arts Academy where, as Zupke later observed, the opposition groups had no contacts. "Students did not belong to the opposition circles" ("Studenten gehörten nicht zum oppositionellen Milieu."). Elections in the German Democratic Republic were organised according to a "Single list" system. Voters were given a piece of paper listing the officially approved candidates and could endorse it by placing their voting slip in the appropriate ballot box. For voters not wishing to endorse the candidates listed there was a separate ballot box at the far end of the polling station. This was intended to discourage people from voting the wrong way, but it also made it relatively easy for observers to count the votes, independently of any officially declared results. In Zupke's apartment there was a parallel counting station operated by the Peace Circle. Actual results were communicated by the opposition groups to western media, as a result of which the election details were reported widely in West Germany.

The East German authorities were not insensitive to the public relations impact of the attention paid by the western media to their election process. The chairman of the electoral commission, better known to later generations as the country's last leader, was Egon Krenz. He was able to announce that 12.2 million of those entitled to vote had voted in favour of the ruling party's candidate list. This represented 98.85% of those entitled to vote. It was the first time in the country's forty-year history that the authorities had announced fewer than 99% of eligible voters in support of their list, which was a clear acknowledgement of an increase in the registered negative votes. However, the opposition groups were able to report, based on their observation, that the total proportion of votes against the party list stood between 3% and 30%, and they computed that overall voter turnout had been between 60% and 80% of those entitled to vote. Scholars subsequently questioned some of the extrapolations involved, but there was clearly a massive discrepancy between the election results announced by the authorities and the actual results observed by the opposition groups.

During the next few months Zupke was centrally involved in organising follow-up protest actions. On 7 June 1989, exactly one month after the fraudulent local election, a major commemorative celebration of it was held in Belin's Sophienkirche (Church of St. Sophia) under the slogan "Nie genug vom Wahlbetrug" (loosely: "never enough [attention paid to] election fraud"). Exactly a month after that, on 7 July 1989, a larger demonstration highlighting the issue was held in the Alexanderplatz. The demonstration on 7 August took place at the Church of Hope in Berlin-Pankow. On 7 September and 7 October the commemorative demonstration returned to the Alexanderplatz. In the course of these demonstrations she was arrested and briefly detained by the Ministry for State Security (Stasi) on 7 July and again on 7 September. The Stasi arrest on 7 September 1989 was combined with a particularly vicious assault. All this was taking place in the context of a rising tide of street protest in the East German cities more generally. Zupke was also working on the ad hoc telephone call centre which opposition activists had been able to set up at the Gethsemane Church, and taking part in the "Dauermahnwache" (vigil) set up on 2 October in support of demonstrators in Leipzig who had been arrested the previous month and remained in detention.

More significant than the breach of the Berlin Wall on 9 November 1989 was the dawning realisation that the Soviet troops in East Germany had no orders to intervene. This triggered a succession of steps along the path to German reunification. Evelyn Zupke participated in these political developments in various ways. She participated in the "Round Table" forums of 1989/90 in Berlin-Weißensee and worked on the Committee for the Dissolution of the Stasi. In March 1990 she was a member of the electoral commission for the first and, as matters turned out, last democratic election in the German Democratic Republic. Along with that she worked in the Initiative for Peace and Human Rights (Initiative Frieden und Menschenrechte / IFM) and in the Matthias Domaschk Archive at the newly created Robert Havemann Society.

She subsequently returned to her career as a specialist care and social worker, having relocated to Hamburg.

On 5 March 2009 The Green Party group in the Berlin regional parliament nominated Zupke as one of several "alternates" to the Federal Convention, which is periodically convened when it becomes necessary to elect a new German President. The effect of this was that Zupke was a member of the "electoral college" that on 23 May 2009 elected Horst Köhler to the presidency (although it seems likely that her own vote will have gone to a rival candidate).

== Awards and honours ==
- 2001 Order of Merit of Berlin
- 2008 Foundation Prize (2007) of the Ludwig Schlaich foundation for "Die Spuren der Vergangenheit als Chance für die Zukunft"
