= Stephan Krawczyk =

German writer and songwriter (born 1955)

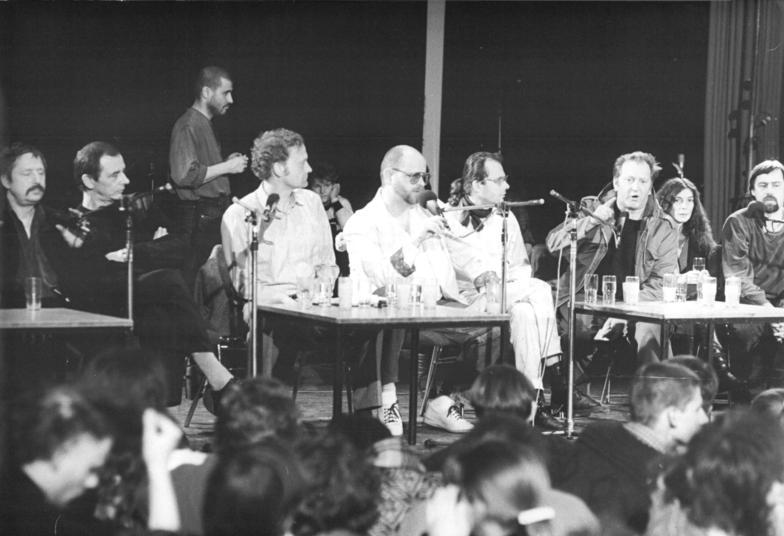
- Stephan Krawczyk (standing behind Friedrich Schorlemmer). Left Wolf Biermann, right Jürgen Fuchs Gabriele Senft,1989
- Born: 31 December 1955 (age 70); Weida, Bezirk Gera, East Germany (now Germany)
- Occupations: Writer, singer-songwriter
- Political party: SED (till 1985: resigned and then expelled)
- Spouse: Freya Klier (1986–1992)

Stephan Krawczyk (born 31 December 1955) is a German writer and songwriter. Before 1989 he was a noted East German dissident.

== Life ==
=== Provenance and early years ===
Stephan Krawczyk was born in Weida, a small industrial town in the hilly countryside between Erfurt and Karl-Marx Stadt (as Chmenitz was known at that time). His father, a miner, was employed in the uranium mines to the east and died while he was still a child. His mother worked for the postal service. Krawczyk passed his school final exams ("Abitur") in 1974 which would normally open the way to a university level education. Before that, however, between 1974 and 1976 he undertook his national/military service. He then worked variously as a concierge and as an administrative assistant at an arts institution.

=== Career in music ===
In 1976, like many ambitious people, Krawczyk became a member of the country's ruling Socialist Unity Party ("Sozialistische Einheitspartei Deutschlands" / SED). The party would play a central part in his life during the next ten years. In 1978 he embarked on a distance-learning study course with the "Franz Liszt" music academy at Weimar, covering the concert guitar, after which he launched himself as a freelance singer-songwriter. Between 1978 and 1983 he built a significant reputation within East Germany as a member of the Gera-based folk group Liedehrlich. In 1981 the Minister for Culture and the Arts awarded him first prize in the National Chanson Contest ("Chansontage der DDR"). The Amiga record label issued a Liedehrlich album on which he starred, and which under the conditions operating in the German Democratic Republic was tantamount to recognition as a "national artist".

=== After Liedehrlich ===
"The authorities wanted to stifle individual expression, which of course is the essence of being an artist, .... I asked myself, “But why shouldn’t I sing as I want?” If I agreed to their constraints, I would no longer be an artist."

Stephan Krawczyk, interviewed by Rory MacLean

December 2012

Liedehrlich had been launched as a folk trio in 1978. At the end of 1982 it became a duo when Stephan Krawczyk withdrew from it. In or before 1984 he relocated to Berlin where he became part of the arts scene in the city's Prenzlauer Berg quarter. Many of those whom he met were involved in the underground but increasingly resolute and sometimes outspoken East German opposition movement. He took an increasing interest in abuses of power by government authorities, environmental degradation, individual rights and the lack of choices. In February 1984 he met the stage-director Freya Klier: during the next few months the two became life-partners. In April 1985 he resigned his party membership and the party reacted by expelling him. He was also served with a performance ban. From now on if he and his partner wished to perform music on a public stage they could do so only in a church. Far from being silenced, because of the reputation he had established with Liedehrlich, he became overnight one of the most high-profile opposition figures in East Germany. The authorities responded by identifying him as an "enemy of the nation" ("Staatsfeind") or even as "the new Wolf Biermann".

=== Life as a dissident ===
Over the next twelve months Krawczyk and Klier worked together on a programme of dramatic pieces and prose readings critical of the "socialist" society. These received supportive responses from audiences of church groups and in community halls. The authorities responded by pressuring the church authorities to block their appearances. But as matters turned out there were more and more churches and community groups that continued to provide them with venues for their presentations. Klier and Krawczyk (who married in 1986) also found themselves deluged with official fines, ordinances and injunctions.

Krawczyk found himself subjected to a sustained programme of Stasi surveillance and harassment. Early in November 1987 Krawczyk and Klier jointly sent a letter - which quickly became an "open letter" - to the party's top ideologist, Kurt Hager. Copies of this letter were widely distributed through the usual informal channels across East Germany and it was also published in the West German media. It was read out at a church concert on 9 November 1987. The letter criticised social conditions in East Germany and called for extensive reforms. It demanded respect for human rights, the reversal of the performance ban that had been served on the two of them, and freedom from state control for the arts and culture sector. Freya Klier believes that the authorities made several attempts on their lives. Krawczyk was deprived of his driving permit for a trifling offence and their car, driven by Klier, was tampered with. On one occasion the brake connections were cut. On another occasion they presumably suffered a nerve gas attack by the car door as a result of which Klier, at the wheel, suffered delusions and narrowly avoided crashing into a tree.

=== Arrest ===
On 17 January 1988 Krawczyk was arrested while making his way to the officially backed Liebknecht-Luxemburg Demonstration, the mass parade was held each year in January to honour Rosa Luxemburg and Karl Liebknecht, two pioneers of German Communism who had been assassinated during months of revolution that followed the First World War. Klier and Krawczyk intended to join in so as to display banners of their own devising. The idea was to draw attention to their own work bans and to highlight more generally their criticisms of the East German social structure. However, at the last minute they learned that other dissident demonstrators had planned to use the event to highlight government refusal to permit them to emigrate to the west, an issue that had never gone away. It was anticipated that western television teams would attempt to report the demonstration, and in order to avoid the risk of "mixed messaging" Klier and Krawczyk decided to leave their own alternative banners at home. Weeks in advance, and well informed as ever, the Ministry for State Security had made their own plans to deal with dissident disruption of the 17 January 1988 celebration. In a series of house arrests immediately before the event approximately 120 civil rights activists were arrested and held for (and in some cases beyond) the duration of the event. (Other sources give the number arrested as 160.) Along with Krawczyk, those arrested directly ahead of the event included Vera Wollenberger and Herbert Mißlitz. Some dissidents nevertheless did participate in the demonstration, and despite the best endeavours of Ministry for State Security officials, several "unauthorized" banners appears on international television reports. The one that resonated most widely used a quote from Rosa Luxemburg herself: "Freedom is always the freedom to think differently" ("Die Freiheit ist immer die Freiheit des Andersdenkenden").

=== Detention and expulsion ===
The arrests during the hours before the demonstration were widely reported in East Germany and West Germany. That was not apparent to the detainees themselves, however. Krawczyk and the others were isolated in the Stasi's special Hohenschönhausen jail. The only people from "outside" to whom they were given access were lawyers provided by the authorities. Not only did these lawyers fail to tell their clients what was going on "outside": they also assured their "clients" that no one "outside" was showing the slightest interest in their fate. At the same time, with the eyes of the media pointing towards them, the East German authorities were keen to avoid a high-profile Wolf Biermann-style deportation. The government objective became to ensure a "voluntary" expulsion to West Germany for Krawczyk and many other of the dissidents who had been arrested at the same time. At the same time, the party's national mass-circulation newspaper, Neues Deutschland published reports of his "secret service connections" and work began on a legal case against him involving "Association with enemies of the state" ("Landesverräterische Beziehungen").

"For my whole first year in the West I had nightmares every night, waking up screaming the second before being shot. I knew I had to be rational about that time, not to become trapped by it, to figure out who I was and to move forward .... At the same time it was only on coming here [to West Germany] that I first confronted my mortality, my humanity. In East Germany all my actions had been seen as political. I’ve come to believe that the most important thing is for us to learn to love ourselves."

Stephan Krawczyk, interviewed by Rory MacLean

December 2012

The rest was left to Krawczyki's lawyer, a man called Wolfgang Schnur who enjoyed the full confidence of fellow dissidents in the local evangelical church community. (In March 1990 it would be discovered that Schnur had been working secretly for the Stasi since 1965, identified in their files variously as "IM-Torsten" or "Dr. Ralf Schirmer".) Through his lawyer Krawczyk was told to expect a twelve-year prison sentence. Alternatively, he could agree to deportation to the west. Although held in isolation, Krawczyk and Klier were able to communicate by passing messages through their lawyer, Wolfgang Schnur, whom they had both known for a long time and in whom they had complete trust. Having both agreed to deportation, on 2 February 1988 Stephen Krawczyk and Freya Klier were unceremoniously delivered across the border to West Berlin. Recovering from his experiences of persecution took a long time. After the changes, which led to surviving Stasi archives becoming accessible to the public, Krawczyk discovered that more than 80 former friends and associates had spied on him for the Stasi.

=== After the changes ===
Directly after reunification, Krawczyk was less frequently in the public eye than his wife. The marriage ended in divorce in 1992. In 1994 Krawczyk was a prominent supporter of the successful independent candidate Stefan Heym in the Bundestag (national parliamentary) election.

Since the 1990s, he has published several books, strongly autobiographical, and dealing in particular with the life-experiences of the generation subjected to East Germany's take on socialism as they were growing up, such as "Das irdische Kind" (loosely: "The worldly/mortal child"). He also returned to his career as a musician, for instance issuing as "Stephan Krawczyk and Band" the CD album "Die Queen ist in der Stadt" ("The Queen's in town"). After the old Stasi jail at Berlin-Hohenschönhausen was converted into a memorial-museum, in 2002 Krawczyk was one of the first to use it as a concert venue. During the 2007/2008 winter season he undertook a performance-tour in the east of Germany with his former wife, Freya Klier. Further stage appearance together followed.

=== Unintended faux pas ===
In 2009 Krawczyk was present at a ceremony at the Bellevue Palace at which twelve former East German civil rights activists received the Order of Merit from the president. The president at one stage turned to Krawczyk and asked him to provide an impromptu rendering of the national anthem. Krawczyk did so, beginning with the first verse. Although the anthem had been reinstated in West Germany in 1952, only the third verse is normally used. The first verse was considered gratuitously bombastic and within Germany carried painful associations in the aftermath of the Nazi years. In East Germany, till 1990, a completely different national anthem had been used. Klier was also present and intervened, causing Krawczyk to break off his rendering, and start again, this time with the third verse. He subsequently issued a public apology for the "unintended lapse" ("unbeabsichtigten Lapsus").

== Output (selection) ==
=== LPs and CDs as a solo artist ===
- 1987: Wieder stehen
- 1989: Wie geht s
- 1990: Schöne wunde Welt
- 1993: Terrormond
- 1995: Milonga
- 2000: Die Queen ist in der Stadt
- 2002: Kontrastprogramm (Live in Bremen-Vegesack)
- 2004: Heute fliegt die Schwalbe hoch
- 2009: Lieber Lieder
- 2009: Ein All
- 2012: Erdverbunden, luftvermählt (Stephan Krawczyk and Martin Luther)

=== Opera and theatre ===
- Der Taubstumme. Opera libretto (Komposition: Rolf Baumgart). Premier performance, Sächsische Staatsoper Dresden (Kleine Szene), 1993
- Faustchen. Schauspiel. Kunsthaus Verlag, Boddin 2000, ISBN 3-933274-36-2

=== Prose and lyrics ===
- Wieder stehen. song lyrics. Knaur, München 1988, ISBN 3-426-02050-5
- Schöne Wunde Welt. Prose, lyrics. self-published, Berlin 1990
- Das irdische Kind. Tales. Verlag Volk und Welt, Berlin 1993, ISBN 3-353-01062-9
- Bald. Novel. Verlag Volk und Welt, Berlin 1998, ISBN 3-353-01138-2
- Steine hüten. Musings. Verlag Volk und Welt, Berlin 2000, ISBN 3-353-01175-7
- Feurio. Musings. Verlag Volk und Welt, Berlin 2001, ISBN 3-353-01195-1
- Der Narr. Novel. Pendo Verlag, Zürich 2003, ISBN 3-85842-547-8
- Das Wendedankfest. Satire. Illustrationen: Rainer Hofmann-Battiston. Kunsthaus Verlag, Boddin 2005, ISBN 3-933274-53-2
- Der Himmel fiel aus allen Wolken. Eine deutsch-deutsche Zeitreise. Evangelische Verlagsanstalt, Leipzig, 2009, ISBN 978-3-374-02709-5

== Awards and honours (selection) ==
- 1981: Main prize at the National Chanson Contest ("Chansontage der DDR").
- 1992: Bettina von Arnim short story prize
- 2001: Order of Merit of Berlin
- 2005: The word not silenced ("Das unerschrockene Wort")“, Prize from the "Association of Luther towns".
