= Hildigund Neubert =

German politician

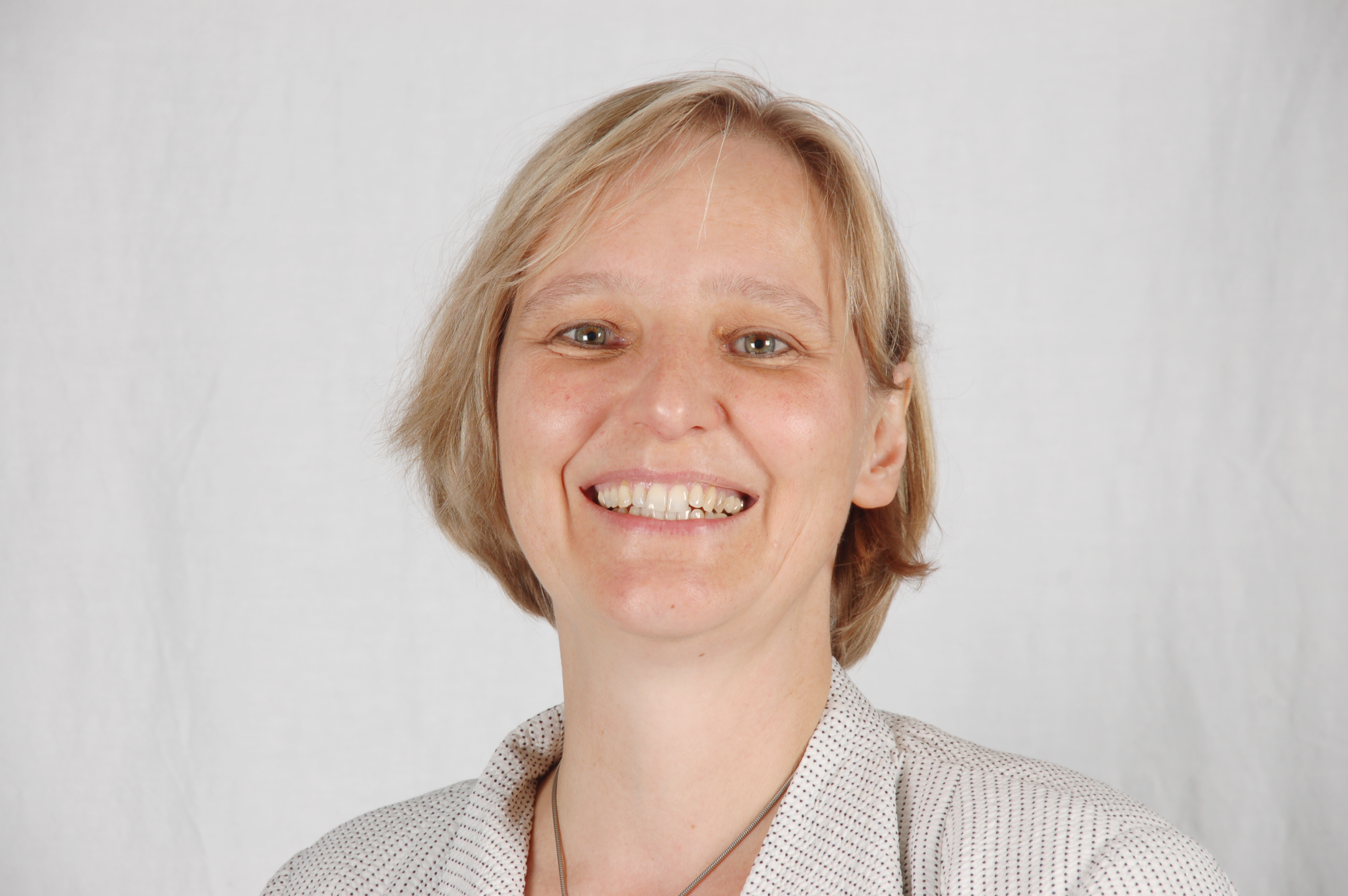
- 2011
- Born: Hildigund Falcke; 1960 (age 65–66); Quedlinburg, Harz, East Germany
- Education: Hochschule für Musik "Franz Liszt", Weimar
- Occupations: Musician (singer); Democracy activist politician Thuringia State Commissioner for Stasi records
- Political party: Demokratischer Aufbruch (DA); CDU
- Spouse: Ehrhart Neubert
- Children: 4
- Parent: Heino & Almuth Falcke

Hildigund Neubert (born Hildigund Falcke) is a German politician. At the time of East Germany's "peaceful revolution" she was a member of Demokratischer Aufbruch (DA, "Democratic Awakening"), one of the political organisations that advocated for democracy and helped bring about the 1990 East German general election.

After reunification she remained active on the centre-right of German politics.

== Life and works ==
=== Early life and education ===
Hildigund Falcke was born in Quedlinburg. Her father is the Evangelical theologian Heino Falcke. She grew up in Gnadau, a village to the north of Quedlinburg. Unlike in most other towns in the German Democratic Republic, Christian belief and engagement was mainstream in Gnadau.

Her mother, Almuth Falcke, had trained and qualified as a nurse. The Falcke children enjoyed a varied musical education and were encouraged to read extensively. Heino Falcke's standing as a theologian and church minister meant that the family were less isolated from western Christendom than most East German children. Hildigund became familiar with the children's books of Erich Kästner, James Krüss and Astrid Lindgren. Both Heino and Almuth Falcke had lived in the West in the past, but during the 1950s they had moved to the GDR to spread and support Christian beliefs.

Because of her father's influential position in the church community she was accepted for admission to the Extended Secondary School in Erfurt when she was thirteen, and permitted to sit for the Abitur (school final exams), which she passed in 1979. She would have liked to study foreign languages, but her background meant that she would never be considered for any job that came with foreign travel privileges, so that there was no question of her being permitted to study foreign languages through the East German education system. Instead she focused on music, and she passed the entrance exam of the Franz Liszt Music Academy in Weimar.

She studied at the academy between 1979 and 1984 and met Ehrhart Neubert, who was working at the academy as part-time student chaplain. He was also employed at the time as a parish priest and was emerging as a leading figure in the East German peace movement. Hildigund and Ehrhart Neubert married in 1987 and moved to Berlin the same year.

=== Berlin ===
In Berlin they lived in a relatively small first-floor apartment by a busy road junction with its own set of traffic lights. Hildigund Neubert's first impression of Berlin was that it was, after Weimar, noisy, cold and dirty. (She and her husband already had two small children two care for.) The "Democracy Now" citizens' movement was also a more obvious reality in Berlin than in Weimar. Two weeks after the young family moved into their little apartment the so-called "Environment Library" at the nearby Church of Zion ("Zionskirche") was stormed by the security services. The Church of Zion was a well-known meeting centre for people engaged with the pro-democracy church-based political reform movement ("Kirche von Unten") and the raid was accompanied by arrests. Neubert hurried over with the babies' pram filled with thermos flasks of hot tea to try and help.

Ehrhart Neubert had many friends and contacts in the citizens' movement: many of its Berlin-based protagonists, such as Bärbel Bohley, Rainer Eppelmann, Rudi Pahnke, Hans-Jochen Tschiche and Edelbert Richter, became regular visitors to the couple's home. The conversations between the friends reflected an awareness of the growing signs of the social and political crisis that was developing in East Germany, still large unreported in the west. Reflecting the church connections of those involved, there was earnest discussion of prayers for peace, and of the growing demand for citizens to be permitted to travel abroad. There was also an effective informal news network: arrests of democracy activists quickly became common knowledge.

=== Demokratischer Aufbruch ===
As the Neuberts returned from a holiday in Saxony they stopped off in Dresden and met up with some of the democracy activists there. At that meeting the establishment of Demokratischer Aufbruch (DA, "Democratic Awakening") was agreed. One of those invited to the movement's inaugural meetings was Wolfgang Schnur who at that time, with his legal training and experience, was seen by many of the activists as a natural leader. Schnur was a close confidant of the respected pastor Horst Kasner A few months later Schnur would be unmasked as a long-standing Stasi spy. Kasner became better known to commentators after his daughter became Germany's chancellor (head of government) in 2005.

The meeting for the foundation of DA was to take place on 1 October 1989 at the Neuberts' apartment, which was conveniently located near to the Alexanderplatz. Ehrhart was among those who would address the meeting: the couple were acutely aware of the danger in which they were placing themselves. By now there were three children, so consideration had to be given to what would happen to the children if their parents were both arrested. In the end they drafted a written power of attorney to be granted to Ehrhart's oldest daughter (from an earlier liaison) providing detailed instructions for taking care of each of the children. This document was carefully concealed inside the piano.

The meeting was scheduled for the afternoon. In 1989 the first of October fell on a Sunday, so all the anticipated participants would be in church for the service and the lunch that followed. When people started to leave they found Rainer Eppelmann waiting outside, and to each of the chosen few he whispered that they should come to the Neuberts' apartment at 15.00. At the time appointed Hildigund's father were already there. The others had only just started to arrive when a police minibus turned up and parked directly outside. After that no more people could be let in to the meeting, but 17 had nevertheless managed to get in before the arrival of the police surveillance team. Hildigund had already left the apartment with the children, so missed the opening hours of the meeting, but when she returned at around half past nine in the evening, the apartment was still full of people, and the "foundation congress" of Demokratischer Aufbruch (DA) was still in full swing. Over the next few days the Neuberts' apartment was the headquarters, the hotel, and by day the main office of DA. There was constant discussion (and eating). Political leaflets were prepared and laboriously copied onto the waxed paper for use on the copying machine. By this time events on the streets were moving fast, and often by the time leaflets were ready for distribution, the news they contained was often out of date. In the kitchen the radio played constantly, while main meals were generally consumed with at least six extra people round the table. Only the largest cooking pots were used for meal preparation. Meanwhile, the children played in their room. The three-year-old could be heard from time to time excitedly calling out something along the lines of, "...without Edon Denz, in time for next year's Lent", (Note: "Ohne Edon Denz in den nästen Lenz!) only to be corrected, in respect of the name of the party first secretary, by the five-year-old. (Note: Egon Krenz took over as First Secretary of the Party Central Committee – effectively East German head of state and government – on 18 October 1989 and remained in post till 3 December 1989.)

A few days later, on 9 October 1989 news came through that a mass pro-democracy demonstration in Leipzig had passed off without bloodshed. Evidently the security services had received no instructions to use "such means might be necessary" to prevent or terminate what turned out to be the first in a series of pro-democracy "Monday demonstrations". Over the next couple of weeks, bolstered by the moral authority of the church and (mostly "below the radar") organisational skills of church leaders, mass demonstrations calling for an end to the one-party dictatorship proliferated. On 4 November the Alexanderplatz demonstration, close to the Neuberts' home in north-central Berlin, is believed to have attracted between half a million and a million protestors. Again, there was huge relief at the absence of bloodshed. First Secretary Honecker had resigned a couple of weeks earlier, responding to a rising tide of pro-democracy street demonstrations and his own increasingly serious medical condition: leadership of the government had passed to Egon Krenz. It was clear, that without the certainty of intervention on the streets by the Soviet forces based in the country, East Germany's government could see no clear way to save their dictatorship using their tried and tested methods. For hundreds of thousands of supporters of the citizens' movement who believed in something better for the country, including Hildigund Neubert, it was immediately clear after the events of 4 November 1989 that the "German Democratic Republic", as it had hitherto existed, was finished. She later recalled an immense and sustained sense of relief that from now on people would be able to read, write and say/listen to whatever they liked. They could meet up with whom they wished without being afraid that they might unknowingly be talking to an "Inoffizieller Mitarbeiter(in)" who would later solemnly write down and report their conversation to the security services. The Neuberts' children could look forward to a "future ... [lived] in freedom".

=== The night the wall was breached ===
9 November 1989 was an important day because it marked the day after the first birthday of Wilhelm, the Neuberts' third (and at the time youngest) child. They remembered the anniversary only the day after it fell, and they hastily improvised an ad hoc ceremony involving a candle, a quick blessing, a hymn and a not quite random present that had been acquired some months earlier. That evening news came through on the radio in the kitchen (tuned to a West German news report) that in East Berlin protesters had breached the wall. There had been no serious attempt by the uniformed border guards and other security service personnel present to prevent the development, and Soviet soldiers looking on made no move. As usual, that evening the Neuberts were entertaining visitors to a meal: on this occasion guests included some "reform communists" from France. Their foreign visitors were convinced that the grapevine reports picked up by the western radio station could not possibly be true. While their German guests slipped off to make their way to the wall and investigate further, the Frenchmen stayed on, determined to pursue the serious discussion they were having at table about the possibility of a future communism with a human face. The Neuberts were therefore not present that evening as the gap in the Berlin Wall was breached and then enlarged so that incredulous East Berliners could pour through, most of them at this stage simply curious to find out how things looked on the other side. It was several days later, having accepted an invitation to give an interview to Radio Glasnost, that Hildigund Neubert undertook her own first visit to West Berlin.

=== Preparations for a democratic future ===
It was only in November 1989 that the Neuberts felt the more oppressive manifestations of party power had been sufficiently constrained for it to be safe to take the children with them on the mass-demonstrations that continued in East Berlin and other Eastern cities during the next few months. Meanwhile, the months and years of earnest citizens' movement discussions began to crystallise into something that might have been construed as a plan. A relatively sober meeting of the DA leadership had taken place on 29 October 1989 at which Hildigund Neubert had been appointed as deputy chair of DA's important Berlin association. With the familiar political and economic state structures having collapsed, there as a desperate appetite among people at every level for a political programme and guidance over what should happen next. There were meetings to be organised and ever more members of what was rapidly mutating into a western-style political party to be invited to them. There was also an endless succession of meetings with influential foreign representatives, who had many of the same questions as the East German citizens. Invited at short notice to a meeting at the US embassy, she was unable to find a baby sitter for the one year old who therefore accompanied her to the meeting. Wilhelm was already quite a mobile child: Neubert's only abiding memory of her meeting with the US diplomat would be of the man's irritation over the child's disruptive infantile antics. It was nevertheless only the first in a succession of meetings at the US embassy during the next three months that she would attend with an infant in her arms.

As deputy chair of the Berlin DA Neubert attended a succession of Berlin round table meetings during December. Eastern representatives of the "Magistrat" (city executive council) were keen to pin the blame for the economic collapse in East Berlin on opposition groups, represented at the discussions by DA delegates, but these attempts gained no traction. Agreement was reached on the future role of the hated East German security service. Its work must cease. The disintegrating ruling party must vacate its offices at the so-called Palace of Democracy and Human Rights, which would be taken over by "opposition groups and parties". At a DA party congress held in December 1989, the organisation's newly acquired similarity to a western-style political party was on display. Soviet-Socialist jargon had disappeared from the political lexicon and there was agreement to view German unity as a legitimate aspiration, even if at this stage there was no agreement among members as to its desirability (or likelihood). Meanwhile, there was a realignment among members, as some on the political left began to switch to the newly relevant Social Democratic Party (which would formally be reintegrated into its western counterpart in November 1990). From the other side of the political spectrum, members of New Forum, which since its foundation in September 1989 had been following a broadly similar trajectory to that followed by DA, now began to switch across to the rapidly evolving party of the citizens' movement. Sensing the political momentum in the east, the western political parties now came fishing. The East German Christian Democratic Union was not an appealing prospect, having been mutated into a Leninist style bloc party in the early 1950s, but several members of DA were attracted by the version of the Christian Democratic Union (CDU) based in West Germany. In April 1990 the political switches of individual members during the previous few months would be rendered inconsequential when both the eastern CDU and DA itself were merged into the now pan-German CDU. DA brought with them their impressive press spokeswoman, Angela Merkel: Merkel had demonstrated, during the early months of 1990, an uncanny ability to bring a level of calm respectability to DA's public face, which belied the frequently chaotic situation behind the scenes.

In October 1989, when it had been launched, it had been easy to agree on opposing the one-party dictatorship; but DA's rapid drift towards the political right led to a political splintering and alarmed, in particular, a number of members whose political involvement had originated with the politicisation of the Protestant churches. At the end of January 1990 Hildigund Neubert was among several prominent members of the leadership to resign their membership on account of the DA's "complete swivel towards the right".

At this stage Neubert was in no hurry to follow former DA colleagues into the CDU. Formed, it seemed to her, primarily by "West German lawyers" she found the party "culturally alien": "I looked different, I was different" ("Ich sah anders aus, ich war anders").

=== Refugees ===
The plight of refugees at this time still had a powerful resonance in East and West Germany, since many of the millions caught up in the ethnic cleansing of the later 1940s had settled in one or other of the two Germanies. During 1989/90 a new wave of westward bound refuges was being released - albeit in very much smaller numbers and under very different circumstances - by the break-up of the Soviet Union. Some were members of the ethnic Russian minorities in the soon to be independent Baltic states. Others were simply Soviet draft-dodgers or people who suddenly found themselves unexpectedly freed from Soviet labour camps. Ehrhart and Hildigund Neubert were instrumental in setting up the "Free Baltics Committee" ("Komitee Freies Baltikum") in order to help some of the escapees. They also participated in regular street demonstrations outside the Soviet embassy, demanding the ending of Soviet control from Estonia, Latvia and Lithuania, to be accompanied by the withdrawal of Soviet troops, after more than fifty years of occupation. On the domestic front, for a number of months the Neuberts accommodated a young Lithuanian deserter from the Soviet army in their Berlin home.

=== Unfolding of the Peaceful Revolution ===
Work in connection with what was becoming known as the "Peaceful Revolution" continued undiminished. The Neuberts' relatively high profile as the Peaceful Revolution unfolded meant that those in East Germany who had suffered government persecution between 1949 and 1989 turned to them for help and advice. Many hoped that perpetrators would now face justice and rehabilitation. In the event the few cases that progressed to trial were lengthy and in most cases disappointing. Rehabilitation laws were passed but proved largely ineffective. After reunification (formally in October 1990), the bloated administrative structures were mostly taken over as they were. Eventually, as the chronic overmanning became apparent, staff levels were reduced, but there were very few openings for those who had previously been considered East German "opposition figures" in the administrative structures that remained. There was also a striking failure to verify which government officials had been Stasi informers: this meant that the next couple of decades were punctuated by the clatter of a skeleton falling out of a closet, as another former collaborator with the hated East German security services was "unmasked" - often as the result of careful research in the surviving Stasi archives. Hildigund Neubert would become exasperated by the growth of "Ostalgie", a nostalgia for the old East German dictatorship. In the immediate aftermath of the collapse of the system, those who had enjoyed the privileges that the party had conferred on true believers had been shocked, depressed and silenced; but by the end of millennium there were plenty of people collecting the old uniforms, organising "Ostalgia" celebrations and relishing the Soviet-Socialist propaganda posters, while remaining content to forget or ignore the more abusive aspects of the East German political and social structures.

=== Bürgerbüro ===
In order to be able to organise and support victims of the East German dictatorship more effectively the Neuberts teamed up with others, such as Bärbel Bohley, an opposition comrade, along with Wolf Biermann and Jürgen Fuchs, former East German dissidents who had found themselves deported to the west in 1976 and 1977, to set up the "Bürgerbüro e.V.– Verein zur Aufarbeitung von Folgeschäden der SED-Diktatur" (Note: "Citizen's Bureau - Association for processing the damaging consequences of the SED dictatorship") in Berlin. Importantly, West German Chancellor Helmut Kohl and the opposition leader Rudolf Scharping were also involved. The office opened in Berlin on 17 June 1996 and was immediately overwhelmed by the sheer volume of enquiries. The association took upon itself the twin objectives both of helping the survivors of political persecution and of lobbying politicians for more effective actions to address some of the "unfinished business" left over from the dictatorship years. Initially on a voluntary basis, and later, till 2003, as a part-time employee, Hildigund Neubert became involved in the work of the office. In the process she became an expert on the many stages of the relevant laws on rehabilitation, the ground rules for press work and the mechanisms and responsibilities of the (West) German Bundestag. One important project on which she worked in depth was a witness survey, complemented by archival research, for a publication on forced labour in East German detention institutions. She continues [in 2020] to retain close links with the Berlin "Bürgerbüro".

=== CDU ===
In December 1996, together with a number of friends who might have been described by commentators as "former East German citizens' rights activists" (though Neubert and her political allies had never actually described themselves in those terms, despite being strongly in favour of citizens' rights), Hildigund Neubert joined the centre-right CDU, thereby reversing the decision implicit in her resignation from DA back in 1990. The powerful taint of the CDU's East German counterpart having operated as bloc party under a one-party dictatorship between 1949 and 1989 was beginning to recede into history. Neubert was attracted by the CDU's promotion of public, open and detailed re-appraisal of the forty years of one-party dictatorship between 1949 and 1989, with a particular emphasis on the conduct of the East German security services. With the centre-left Social Democratic Party (SPD) making its own highly effective pitch for the support of centrist German voters, the centre-ground of German politics was hotly contested during the mid-1990s: the CDU leaders were therefore under intensified pressure to attract support from formerly East German democracy activists such as Neubert. The appeal of the CDU was enhanced, for Neubert, by her conviction that it would never co-operate politically with the successor party to the old East German SED, which had been scrambling since 1990 - with some success - to reinvent itself as a democratic party of the left, able to compete for voter support under a multi-party West European political system. The SPD had at times been more equivocal when its leaders were invited to speculate about a future in which they might countenance future coalitions (or worse) with the PDS (formerly the SED). The clinching argument for Neubert was that the CDU held itself out as a Christian party. (Note: CDU stands for "Christian Democratic Union".) Traditionally the CDU heartland had been in the Catholic south and west of Germany, while Neubert's Christian background was Resolutely Protestant, but even in this respect the CDU was changing. Between 1994 and 1998, slightly implausibly, a rising star in Helmut Kohl's final government was a woman who had, like Neubert, grown up in the German Democratic Republic as the daughter of a Protestant pastor. Hildigund Neubert's decision to join the CDU certainly came as a shock to many friends and colleagues, but she herself would later insist that, ultimately, the Neuberts lost surprisingly few friends on account of her move. For a number of years after 1996 Hildigund Neubert served as a member of the CDU Regional Party Executive for Berlin.

Early experiences of life at the Alexanderplatz CDU office were disappointing. Forty-five years of east–west differentness were not to be so quickly buried. The regional party executive for Berlin contained far more members with roots in the West than in the East. Neubert's hope that as a member of the regional party executive she would enjoy better access to political information or more influence over CDU strategy in the Berlin senate (which at that time was controlled by the CDU) were quickly dashed. There were, to be sure, one or two familiar faces from her time with the DA, but as a rule the "not so youthful concrete squad" of western majority CDU members would take their decisions and vote in the Party Executive as a block, without paying too much attention to comrades from the east. The Berlin Bank scandal which surfaced in 2000 suggested that the city's CDU power brokers had been "spoiled by power". Constant calls for truth and transparency from a new female member of the regional party executive received very little attention at meetings. The political damage to the CDU in Berlin was immense. The political education from which Hildigund Neubert benefitted was salutary.

A further learning opportunity was presented by the elections to the Berlin Chamber of Representatives in 2001. Mindful of the political damage suffered from the previous year's bank scandal, the party were determined that they should at least offer a plausible directly electable candidate in each of the city boroughs. Hildigund Neubert was selected as the CDU candidate for Berlin-Lichtenberg. The seat had been won by Gesine Lötzsch of the PDS in every city election since reunification. Lichtenberg had been home to the vastly bureaucratic national headquarters of Erich Mielke's Stasi organisation: large numbers of former Stasi officers and officials still lived in Lichtenberg with their families. Neubert found her election posters were promptly defaced or torn down by the "comrades of the armed organs" who had served the East German state and still mourned its passing. Open discussion forums between the different candidates did not take place. As far as Lichtenberg was concerned, there was still only one political party that mattered, although Neubert was still able to engage in individual conversations on the streets. She would later describe the small local group of CDU stalwarts as "almost completely de-Christianised". Six months before the election she had managed a minor victory when, with extreme difficulty, she had managed to arrange a Maundy Thursday Easter egg hunt for the children of Lichtenberg. But when election day arrived on 21 October 2001 she received just 13% of the votes for a directly elected candidate. It was small consolation that this was more than the 11% that the party achieved in the electoral district in respect of its list candidates. Across Berlin, the 2001 state election was almost as disappointing. The party ended up with 35 deputies, in place of the 76 allocated following the previous election. The CDU was comfortably outpolled by the SPD.

=== State Commissioner for Stasi records ===
In 2003 her appointment as State Commissioner for Stasi records in Thuringia marked something of a new beginning. Ehrhart Neubert was by now 63 and nearing retirement, but Hildigund was still only 43, and keen to take on a new public role when Thuringia's new Minister-president, Dieter Althaus, proposed her for the Erfurt-based job in succession to Jürgen Haschke. The appointment was confirmed by a vote in the state parliament ("Landtag") on 23 October 2003. The term of her appointment was initially of five years, but in 2008 she was re-elected for a second five-year term, thereby staying in the post for ten years, just as her predecessor had done.

In some ways Neubert's responsibilities were not so different from those she had undertaken at the Bürgerbüro, but as only the second Thuringia State Commissioner for Stasi records she had the chance to set her own priorities according to her own assessments of what was needed. In a frantic evidence destroying exercise, back in 1989/90 as democracy activists stormed the main administrative offices of the Stasi, Stasi officers set about burning the files, but due both to the vast number of files and the speed with which democracy activists stormed the buildings and prevented the destruction of documents, many records survived. Roughly 50% of the surviving Stasi files on individual citizens were centrally archived at the Stasi Records Agency in Berlin. The other half were archived locally by the Stasi record agencies in each of the five new Federal States (former East Germany). (Note: A sixth regional Stasi record agency covering East Berlin was also established.) People who believe that the East German security Services might have been maintaining files on them have a legal entitlement to search in the records agencies to find out what information on them had been collected and filed. As commissioner for Stasi records, Neubert provided advice on how to locate and search the files that concerned them. She also prioritized helping former victims of state persecution with rehabilitation and restitution procedures. Advising employers who wished to use surviving Stasi records to find out if any of their current or potential employees had been registered as one of several hundred thousand Stasi informers during the dictatorship years was another important part of her responsibilities. There was also a large amount of work in supporting the work of journalists, historians and other researchers, young and old, many of them involved in education provision. Not infrequently she found herself in controversial situations involving the lives of individuals. Skills in conflict resolution were an important job requirement. One reason that she loved the job, as she herself recalled, was that during her ten-year term of office she never stopped learning.

Under the laws which had established the regional Commissioners for Stasi records, a third five-year term in office was not possible. When Neubert retired from the job in 2013, Landtag President Birgit Diezel, paid tribute to the great passion and unstinting commitment which she had applied to the job. Thanks to Hildigund Neubert, Thüringia had been the first German state to implement pensions for victims of particularly harsh treatment and/or imprisonment under the one-party dictatorship. Diezel also singled out for special mention the compensation fund that Neubert, through sheer persistence, had managed to establish for victims of the East German system of residential homes for orphaned children and young people. Responding to Diezel, Neubert commended the political establishment for never having attempted to apply pressure or influence to the commission. She explained that more than twenty years after the ending of the dictatorship, further examination of Stasi files to check out whether new applicants for jobs in the public and private sectors were in most cases superfluous, since younger job applicants were too young to have been involved with the Stasi, while the necessary checks had in most cases already been performed in respect of older applicants. But the educational role of the commission was undiminished. There were still plenty of people with curious questions about the history of the one-party dictatorship. And in the case of politicians, she firmly believed that on-going Stasi checks were necessary: "If someone has worked for the Stasi, that says something important about that person's respect for the personal rights and liberties of other people".

=== Retirement? ===
Since 2011 Hildigund Neubert has been a board member of the Konrad Adenauer Foundation and, since 2013, a vice-chairwoman of it.

== Recognition ==
In 2006 Hildigund Neubert was awarded the Order of Merit ("Bundesverdienstkreuz").
