= Stiftung Sächsische Gedenkstätten zur Erinnerung an die Opfer politischer Gewaltherrschaft =

German foundation

Stiftung Sächsische Gedenkstätten zur Erinnerung an die Opfer politischer Gewaltherrschaft is a public foundation founded by the Free State of Saxony, which owns and supports memorials to the victims of Communism and National Socialism. The foundation is a founding member institution of the Platform of European Memory and Conscience.

In the totalitarian communist regime of East Germany, only communist victims of national socialism were commemorated. Hence, after 1989, the need for institutions and memorials to other victims of national socialism and to victims of communism arose. The foundation was founded by the state government of Saxony on 15 February 1994. On 28 February 2003, the Landtag of Saxony adopted a law regulating the activities of the foundation (Sächsische Gedenkstättenstiftungsgesetz).

The foundation is headed by Siegfried Reiprich, who is also a member of the Executive Board of the Platform of European Memory and Conscience.
