= Matthias Domaschk =

Matthias Domaschk (born 12 June 1957 in Görlitz – 12 April 1981 in Gera) was a member of the civil rights movement within the German Democratic Republic and a victim of the Stasi.

== Life ==
In September 1974, Domaschk began an apprenticeship as a precision machinist with VEB Carl Zeiss Jena. From 1975 on, he was involved in the Junge Gemeinde Jena-Stadtmitte (evangelical youth organization). In 1976 after his participation in protests against the expatriation of Wolf Biermann from the GDR, he was interrogated for the first time by the Stasi. In 1977, he organized a relief action of letters and packages for opposition figures arrested in Jena and travelled with his partner Renate Groß to Prague, where they were both were among the founders of Charter 77 and reported on the events in Jena. This trip was regarded by the GDR authorities as an act of conspiracy. Because of his political activities, he was expelled from his Abitur class four weeks before the final oral examination and could not complete his last school year. This made it impossible for him to move on and study geodesy at a university level as he had intended.

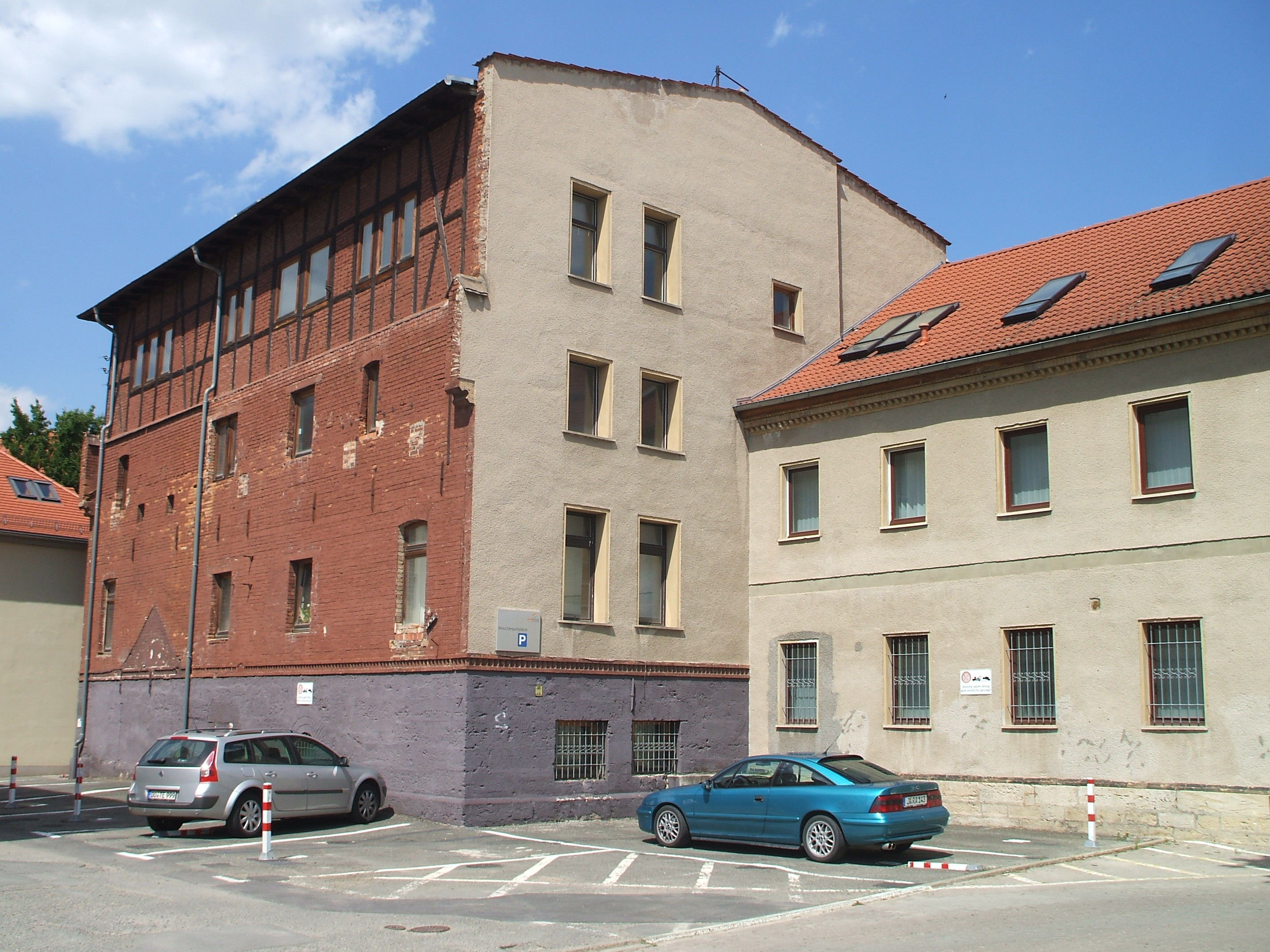
Former residence of Matthias Domaschk and Renate Groß (Am Rähmen 3, Jena)

From the autumn of 1977 until 1979 he performed military service for the National People's Army and then worked as a machinist at ZIMET (the Central Institute for Microbiology and Experimental Therapy) in Jena. In 1980 he took part in meetings of the peace group SoFd (Sozialer Friedensdienst, "Social Peace Service") in addition to an East-West meeting in Poland between former residents of Jena and current members of the Jungen Gemeinde. With his friend Peter Rösch (also from Jena) he visited Gdańsk, where he made contact with the Solidarity movement. A Stasi spy reported on 23 March 1981 to his commanding officer Roland Mähler that Domaschk had won the support of the dissident philosophy student Siegfried Reiprich to be the "ideological head" of a terrorist group along the lines of the Italian Red Brigades. The report was false.

On 10 April 1981, Domaschk was travelling with Rösch to a birthday celebration in East Berlin. On the same weekend, the Tenth Party Congress of the SED was to be held. On orders of the Stasi, Domaschk and Rösch were arrested on the train and after a first interrogation in Jüterbog, they spent the next day in the Stasi detention center in Gera. They were accused of having planned disruptive activities during the Congress.

On April 12, after many hours of interrogation, Domaschk wrote a handwritten pledge to employees of the Stasi. He was scheduled for release at 2:00 p.m. but died in the visiting room of the detention center under unclear circumstances. Stasi files offer conflicting reports on the time of death, varying by 15 minutes. The official Stasi report cites suicide as the cause of death; this is strongly doubted by Domaschk's friends and acquaintances.

== Consequences of his death ==
=== Reception in East Germany ===
The news of Domaschk's death spread like wildfire within opposition circles in Jena and other cities of the GDR. His funeral on April 16, 1981 was attended by more than one hundred friends, despite attempts to cancel the event by the Stasi. (The Stasi official count records 107 mourners.)

After Domaschk's death, Jena saw both an increase in protest activity and a rise in emigration applications.

Domaschk's friends Roland Jahn, Petra Falkenberg and Manfred Hildebrandt marked the first anniversary of his death with a memorial statement which they secretly placed at high-traffic locations in urban areas in order to draw attention to his unexplained death.

At Easter 1982, a commemorative sculpture by Jena sculptor Michael Blumhagen was installed in the Johannisfriedhof. It was stolen four days later by a task force working on behalf of the Stasi. Roland Jahn photographed the removal.

=== Legal review after 1990 ===
The question of whether Domaschk's death was suicide, accident, or murder remains officially unclear because the responsible Stasi officers continue to maintain the GDR's version of events. In September 2000, an investigation called Domaschk's friend Peter Rösch to testify as a witness. Because of the existing evidence against suicide, the charge of false imprisonment or other violations of the law could not be firmly established, according to the competent prosecutor in Gera. The court therefore dismissed the complaint of false imprisonment or death. The Stasi officers were sentenced to short terms for unlawful detention. The relatives and friends of Domaschk continue to maintain that the Stasi is responsible for his death.

In January 2015, the red-red-green government of Thuringia announced a review of the case.

== Honours ==
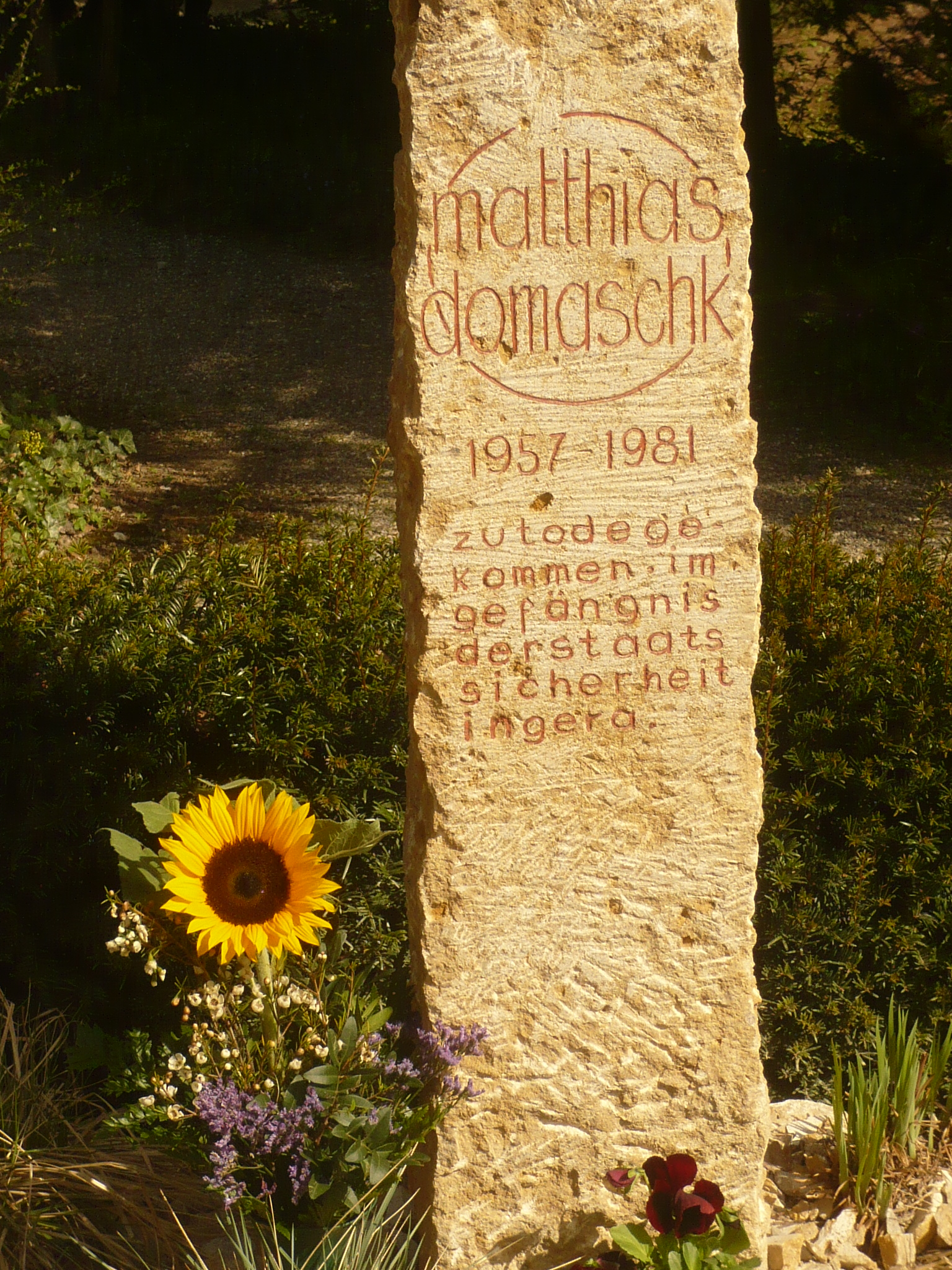
Matthias Domaschk grave, Jena 2011

In the Jena district Lobeda-West, a street is named after Matthias Domaschk. In 2009 following an initiative of the student council, the auditorium of the University of Jena was named in his honour. At the 30th anniversary of his death, a grave of honour (Ehrengrab) was opened at the Jena Nordfriedhof in Urnenhain IIIa.

Two archives of GDR-era surveillance records bear his name: the Matthias-Domaschk archive in the Robert-Havemann-Gesellschaft e. V. in Berlin, and the Thuringian Archive for Contemporary History (AfZ) "Matthias Domaschk", e. V. in Jena.

== Links ==
- Literature by and about Matthias Domaschk in the German National Library catalogue
- Der Fall Matthias Domaschk im Rahmen der Jugendopposition in der DDR (Bundeszentrale für politische Bildung / Robert-Havemann-Gesellschaft e. V.).
