= Ehrhart Neubert =

German evangelical minister and theologian (1940–2024)

- Born: 2 August 1940; Herschdorf, Gau Thuringia, Germany
- Died: 17 November 2024 (aged 84); Limlingerode, Thuringia, Germany
- Occupations: Theologian; Lutheran minister Dissident (East Germany); Writer (history and sociology)
- Spouse: Hildigund Neubert (born Hildigund Falcke)

Ehrhart Neubert (2 August 1940 – 17 November 2024) was a German evangelical minister and theologian.

During its final decade he emerged as an opponent of the East German one-party dictatorship, becoming a member of the League of Evangelical Churches in the German Democratic Republic (Bund der Evangelischen Kirchen in der DDR/BEK). Since the collapse of the East German political regime in 1989/90 he has participated prominently on committees and as an author seeking to understand and evaluate it.

== Biography ==
Neubert was born into the family of a Protestant minister in 1940 in Herschdorf, a hillside village near Erfurt in central southern Germany. He grew up in nearby Großenbehringen. Between 1958 and 1963 he studied Theology at Jena. After 1964 he worked at Niedersynderstedt initially as a vicar and later as the minister in charge for the parish. From 1973 he was combining his parish duties with work as a student chaplain at nearby Weimar. In 1976, probably on the advice of Robert Havemann, he joined the CDU, in western Germany a political party of the moderate right, but in the politically and by this time physically separated eastern German state, one of the so-called "block parties" controlled by the ruling Socialist Unity Party of Germany (Sozialistische Einheitspartei Deutschlands/SED) party through an organisation known as the National Front (Nationale Front der Deutschen Demokratischen Republik/NF). In 1984 Neubert resigned from the CDU. In 1984 he became community sociology secretary in the Theology Studies department with the Berlin-based East German League of Evangelical Churches.

From 1967 Ehrhart Neubert was also taking part in various informal discussion groups, focusing on theology, sociology and the interface between them. He was sympathetic to the civil right demands of Robert Havemann, who was seen by the regime as a high-profile political dissident. By 1979 Neubert was participating actively in Peace Groups of the Evangelical Students' Association and, during the 1980s, in other peace circles. He found himself increasingly in conflict both with the state authorities and with the inherently collaborationist leaderships of the official evangelical churches which were keen to retain a level of recognition and toleration from the party leadership. Neubert also produced a number of quasi-political sociological and theological studies: some of his work appeared in West Germany under the pseudonym "Christian Joachim".

During East Germany's Peaceful Revolution, Neubert was a co-founder of the Democratic Awakening movement, founded in 1989 in his apartment. He contributed to the new party's programme and served as its first vice-chairman. He represented Democratic Awakening at several of the East German Round Table sessions and served on various related investigatory commissions. A (relatively) young fellow activist in Democratic Awakening was Angela Merkel who later became Chancellor of Germany. Finding himself out of sympathy with what he saw at the time a shift towards the political right, in January 1990 Neubert resigned from Democratic Awakening. The crunch issue appears to have been the issue of its developing political alliances, notably with the CDU (party): Merkel stayed. After reunification, which formally took place in the late summer of 1990, in 1992 he became a member of the Brandenburg branch of the Alliance 90 (political party).

In 1976 the Stasi had attempted, without success, to recruit Neubert: sixteen years later, as a member of the "Law and reconciliation" initiative, Neubert stood up for the rights of Stasi victims and for fair and consistent treatment of those involved in the endlessly complex interactions of the Stasi and the Protestant churches in former East Germany. In 1992 the Alliance 90 group in the Brandenburg Landtag ("regional parliament") nominated him as a member of the Stolpe inquiry committee. The committee concluded its work in 1994 (although many of the matters it investigated would not be so quickly laid to rest). In 1996 Ehrhart Neubart re-joined the Christian Democratic Union of Germany (Christlich Demokratische Union Deutschlands/CDU party). That same year, at the age of 46, he received his doctorate from the Free University of Berlin for a dissertation on the history of political opposition in the German Democratic Republic from 1949 to 1989. In 1998 the work was published, repackaged into a volume of approximately 1000 pages.

In 1997 Neubert took a post with the Stasi Records Agency (Bundesbeauftragten für die Unterlagen des Staatssicherheitsdienstes der ehemaligen Deutschen Demokratischen Republik/BStU), taking charge of the agency's research and education department. Together with the agency's commissioner of the time, Joachim Gauck, Neubert compiled the German contribution to the German-language version of The Black Book of Communism, writing the chapter entitled "Politische Verbrechen in der DDR" ("Political Crimes in East Germany"). Elsewhere he has made numerous further written contributions on resistance and opposition, and the position of religious people and institutions, in former East Germany. In 1998 he was co-opted as a board member of the Federal Foundation for the Reappraisal of the SED Dictatorship (Bundesstiftung zur Aufarbeitung der SED-Diktatur). By this time he had already become, in 1996, a founding member of the Bürgerbüro (Verein) Bürgerbüro - Verein zur Aufarbeitung von Folgeschäden der SED-Diktatur, a Berlin-based organisation established to provide practical and psychological advice and support for victims of East Germany's Socialist Unity Party version of socialism, subsequently becoming the organisation's president on the death of Bärbel Bohley.

Erhart Neubert retired in 2005, but still filled in as a Lutheran minister in the Limlingerode area. He married Hildigund (born Hildigund Falcke) in 1987: she shares his background as an East German opposition activist with evangelical church connections, also sharing his commitment since 1990 to researching and recording the dictatorship. She later served for ten years as State Commissioner for Stasi records in Thuringia.

Neubert died in Limlingerode, Germany on 17 November 2024, at the age of 84.
