= Friedrich Schorlemmer =

German Protestant theologian (1944–2024)

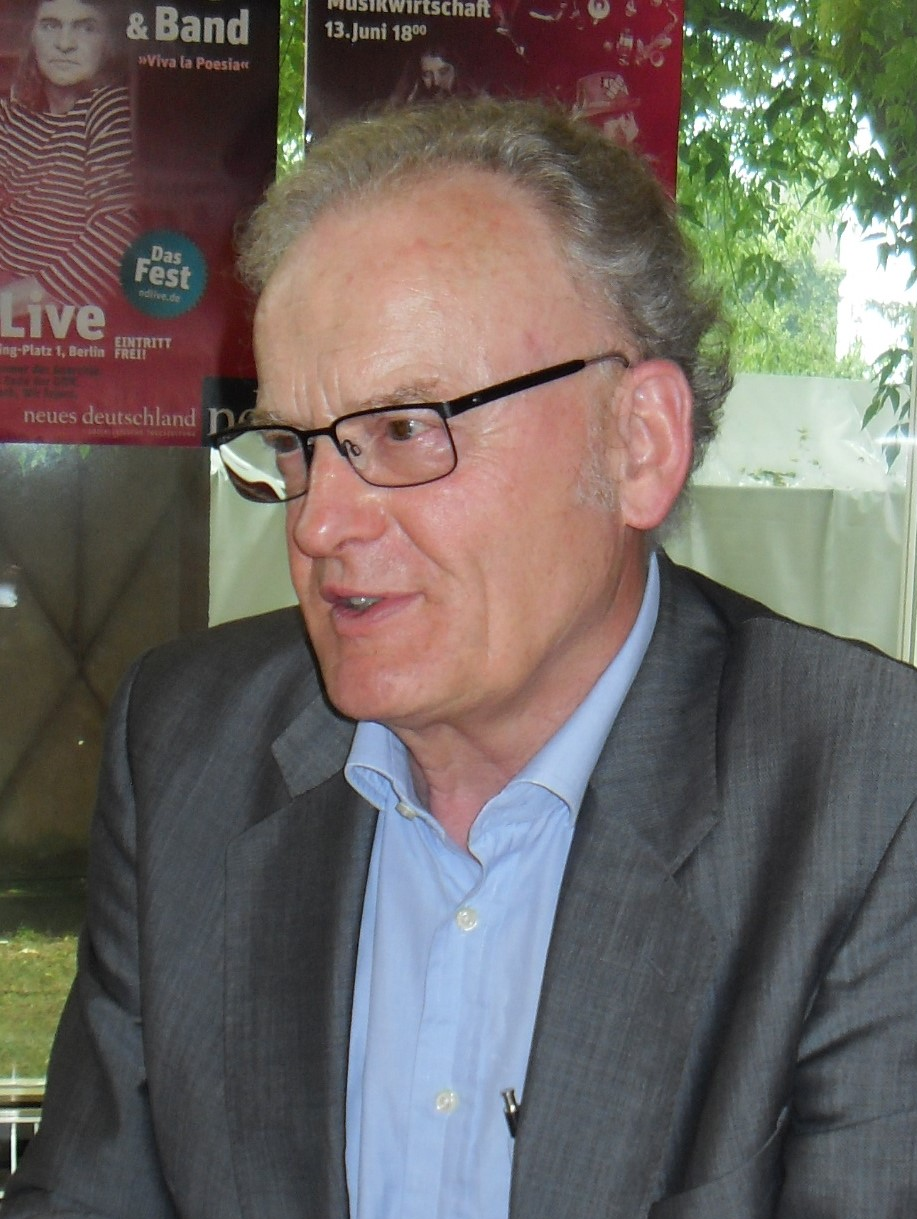
- Schorlemmer in 2015
- Born: 16 May 1944; Wittenberge, Gau March of Brandenburg, Germany
- Died: 9 September 2024 (aged 80); Berlin, Germany
- Education: Martin Luther University Halle
- Occupations: Protestant theologian; Civil rights activist; Peace activist
- Organizations: All Saints' Church, Wittenberg; Democratic Awakening
- Awards: Carl von Ossietzky Medal; Friedenspreis des Deutschen Buchhandels; Order of Merit of the Federal Republic of Germany
- Website: www.friedrich-schorlemmer.de/bio.html

Friedrich Schorlemmer (German pronunciation: [ˈfʁiːdʁɪç ˈʃɔʁlɛmɐ]; 16 May 1944 – 9 September 2024) was a German Protestant theologian. He was a prominent member of the civil rights movement in East Germany, leading to the Peaceful Revolution. Remaining active in politics and society after German reunification in 1990, he was engaged in the Wittenberg town council and several organisations as an activist for peace and nature preservation, and as a critical voice.

== Life and career ==
Friedrich-Wilhelm Schorlemmer was born in Wittenberge on 16 May 1944. He grew up in the small town of Werben in the region of Altmark. As the son of a Protestant pastor, Schorlemmer was not allowed by the East German authorities to take the exams at a normal secondary state school, but he passed his at an adult education centre. As a pacifist, he refused to perform military service in 1962. From 1962 to 1967 he studied Protestant theology at the Martin Luther University in Halle.

=== Theology ===
Schorlemmer worked as a vicar in Halle West and as a supervisor of studies in a students' home from 1968. After his ordination in 1970, he worked as a pastor in charge of young people and especially students in Merseburg from 1971. He was a member of the Protestant synods of Saxony and of East Germany from 1976. In 1978, he became both a lecturer at the Protestant pastors' seminary in Wittenberg and a pastor at All Saints' Church there, the church closely associated with Martin Luther and his 95 Theses.

Finally, from 1992 until his retirement in December 2007, he was head of studies of theology, culture and modern history at the Protestant Academy of Saxony-Anhalt in Wittenberg.

=== Politics ===
In 1968, when Alexander Dubček tried to reform communism in Czechoslovakia in the Prague Spring, Schorlemmer and his friends not only sympathized with that development but also spread information about it. In the 1980s, he worked for environmental, human rights and peace groups. He founded a peace group in 1980. The Stasi's department of "political underground" put him under observation. He was responsible for a symbolical action for peace at the Kirchentag national church assembly in Wittenberg on 24 September 1983, in which a sword was turned into a ploughshare by Stefan Nau, a local blacksmith. The Stasi did not interfere because Richard von Weizsäcker, then mayor of West Berlin, attended the action, as a representative of the Protestant Church in Germany, and the Western media reported about it. In 1988, Schorlemmer's Wittenberg peace group presented twenty theses at the Kirchentag in Halle, demanding more freedom, which was a provocation at the time.

On 21 August 1989, Schorlemmer was among the founders of a group called Democratic Awakening (Demokratischer Aufbruch) in Dresden. After this group became a political party in December 1989, and Wolfgang Schnur (who was later identified as a collaborator of the Stasi) and Rainer Eppelmann increasingly worked together with the Christian Democratic Union, Schorlemmer and various members left. Schorlemmer joined the East German Social Democrats in the beginning of 1989.

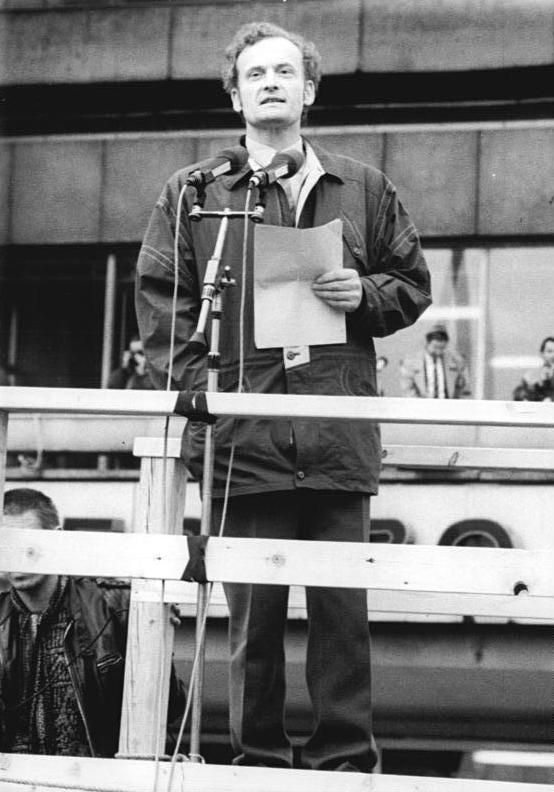
Speaker at the Alexanderplatz demonstration in Berlin, 4 November 1989

The largest mass meeting in East German history took place on Alexanderplatz in East Berlin on 4 November 1989. Many East Germans were no longer willing to accept the dictatorship of the ruling Socialist Unity Party of Germany (SED). It was a dangerous situation, with the possibility of a clash between the demonstrators and armed forces. Schorlemmer was one of the speakers at the Alexanderplatz demonstration. He called for change and a new beginning, but he also pleaded for nonviolence.

After the Fall of the Berlin Wall on 9 November 1989, many people left East Germany. Schorlemmer and others published a passionate appeal to stay and build up a new and better kind of society there: Für unser Land (For our country). Schorlemmer remained politically active. He was elected to the Wittenberg town council in 1990 and became speaker of the SPD fraction, serving until 1994. He was chairman of the Willy Brandt Society (Willy-Brandt-Kreis). He was one of the editors of the journal Der Freitag, a weekly with a daily online edition, and of the monthly Blätter für deutsche und internationale Politik. As a member of the German centre of International PEN, the association of writers, he was among the authors of an open letter in 2004 that asked Muslim intellectuals to protest against international terrorism. He joined the German Commission for UNESCO and the BUND, an organization for the protection of nature and the environment. In 2009, he joined ATTAC, the network of globalization critics. He was one of the founders of the Institut Solidarische Moderne in January 2010.

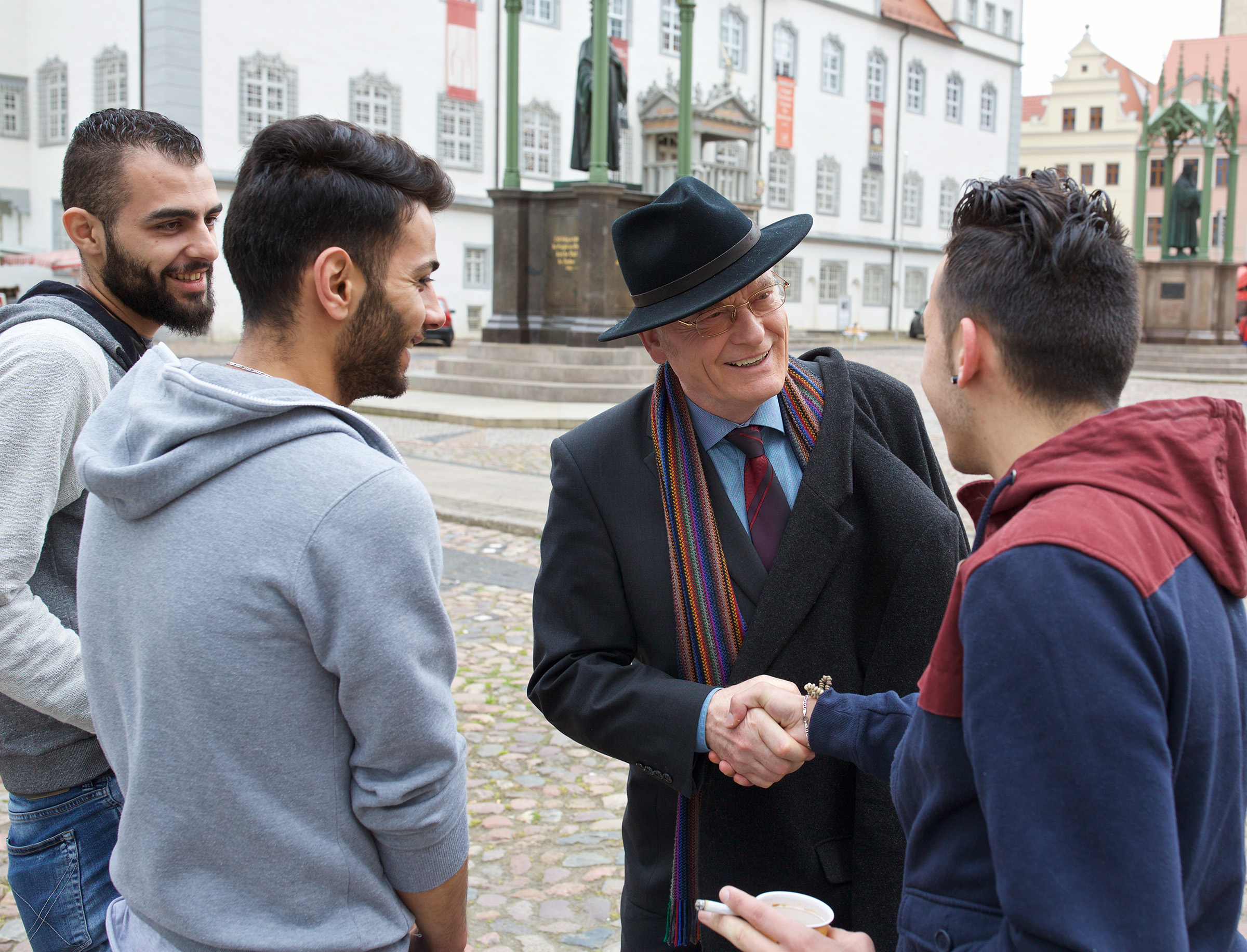
Friedrich Schorlemmer and refugees in Wittenberg, 2016

Schorlemmer spoke out against the wars in Afghanistan in 2001 and Iraq in 2003. He published Reformation in der Krise (Reformation in a crisis) on the occasion of the 500th anniversary of the Protestant Reformation, with a critical view of the celebrations and the position on Protestantism then.

He published numerous books, essays, speeches and sermons.

=== Personal life ===
Schorlemmer was married, the couple had a daughter, Uta. They lived in Wittenberg. His younger brother was Andreas Schorlemmer, pastor in Groß Kiesow. After his dementia diagnosis in 2022, Schorlemmer withdrew from the public and lived in a nursing home in Berlin.

He died in Berlin on 9 September 2024, at the age of 80. President Frank-Walter Steinmeier described him as a courageous fighter for freedom and democracy, one of the people who made the Peaceful Revolution possible.

== Publications ==
- Bis alle Mauern fallen. Berlin 1991. ISBN 978-3-373-00477-6
- Worte öffnen Fäuste. Die Rückkehr in ein schwieriges Vaterland. Munich 1992. ISBN 978-3-463-40169-0
- Zu seinem Wort stehen. Kindler Verlag, Munich 1994. ISBN 978-3-463-40253-6
- Eisige Zeiten – Ein Pamphlet. Munich 1996. ISBN 978-3-89667-008-3
- Die Wende in Wittenberg – Persönlicher Rückblick. Drei Kastanien Verlag, 1997, ISBN 978-3-933028-01-3.
- Absturz in die Freiheit – Was uns die Demokratie abverlangt. Berlin 2000. ISBN 978-3-7466-7029-4
- Die Bibel für Eilige. Aufbau-Verlag, Berlin 2003, ISBN 978-3-7466-1920-0.
- In der Freiheit bestehen. Aufbau-Verlag, Berlin 2004, ISBN 978-3-7466-7045-4.
- Hier stehe ich, Martin Luther. Aufbau-Verlag, Berlin 2003, ISBN 978-3-351-02563-2.
- Den Frieden riskieren. Sätze und Grundsätze, Pamphlete und Predigten, Reden und Aussprüche aus zwanzig Jahren. Stuttgart 2003. ISBN 978-3-87173-277-5
- (ed.) Lebenswege – Gespräche mit Zeitgenossen, von 1991–2006. Halle 1995–2006. ISBN 978-3-89812-457-7
- (ed.): Was protestantisch ist / Große Texte aus 500 Jahren. Freiburg i. B. 2008. ISBN 978-3-451-29845-5
- Wohl dem, der Heimat hat. Berlin 2009, ISBN 978-3-351-02679-0.
- Albert Schweitzer. Genie der Menschlichkeit. Aufbau Verlag, Berlin 2009, ISBN 978-3-351-02712-4.
- Zorn und Zuwendung. (Co-Autor: Hans-Dieter Schütt) Berlin 2011, ISBN 978-3-360-02122-9.
- Klar sehen und doch hoffen, Mein politisches Leben. Aufbau Verlag, Berlin 2012, ISBN 978-3-351-02750-6.
- Die Gier und das Glück. Wir zerstören, wonach wir uns sehnen. Herder, Freiburg im Breisgau 2014, ISBN 978-3-451-33515-0.
- (with Gregor Gysi): Was bleiben wird: Ein Gespräch über Herkunft und Zukunft. Aufbau Verlag, Berlin 2015, ISBN 978-3-351-03599-0.
- Unsere Erde ist zu retten. Haltungen, die wir jetzt brauchen. Herder, Freiburg im Breisgau 2016, ISBN 978-3-451-34978-2.
- Luther : Leben und Wirkung. Aufbau Verlag, Berlin 2017, ISBN 978-3-7466-3281-0.
- WORTmacht und MACHTworte. Eine Eloge auf die Leselust. Radius, Stuttgart 2018, ISBN 978-3-87173-067-2.

== Awards and honours ==
Schorlemmer was awarded the Carl von Ossietzky Medal of the International League for Human Rights in 1989, the Friedenspreis des Deutschen Buchhandels peace prize of the German Book Trade in 1993, the Order of Merit of the Federal Republic of Germany in 2009, and the Gold Medal from the Humboldt-Gesellschaft in 2014. In 2002 he was present to receive an honorary doctorate from Concordia University Texas.

He was awarded honorary doctorates, from the Concordia University Texas in Austin in 2002, and from the European University Viadrina in 2014. He became an honorary citizen of Wittenberg in 2015.
