= Freya Klier =

German author and film director (born 1950)

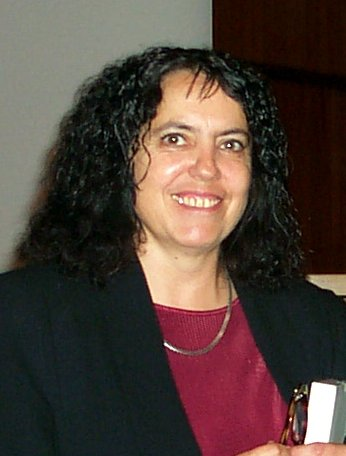
- Klier in 2001
- Born: 4 February 1950 (age 76); Dresden, Saxony, East Germany
- Occupations: Author; Stage and screen director Civil rights activist
- Political party: SED (till 1985)
- Spouse(s): Gottfried Klier; Stephan Krawczyk
- Children: 1

Freya Klier (born 4 February 1950) is a German author and film director. Before 1989/90, she was an East German civil rights activist.

== Life ==
=== Early years and confrontations with state authority ===
Freya Klier was born in Dresden, the child of working-class parents. Her father, who worked as a painter and decorator, became involved in a fight when she was three, defending his wife. The man whom he hit was an off-duty policeman. Klier's father spent the next twelve months in prison while her mother was switched to night shift work. Freya and her four-year-old brother were sent to a state orphanage. The family were reunited a year later, but the children were from this point marked out as the children of political prisoners, a stigma that affected them adversely until the East German dictatorship finally crumbled into history in 1990.

In 1966 her brother, at the time barely seventeen years old, was accused of "slandering the state" and sentenced to a four-year jail term, following which she resolved to emigrate. As a result of the slaughter of war in the 1940s and massive emigration in the 1950s East Germany was desperately short of working-age population. By 1966 leaving the country – even temporarily – was for most people "against the rules" and impossible. Freya Klier nevertheless devised a plan to escape with an acquaintance from a Swedish theatre group, armed with a false passport and travelling aboard a Swedish merchant ship. Shortly before the ship was due to sail, in July 1966, she was betrayed and arrested. She was sentenced "for attempting to flee the Republic" (wegen "versuchter Republikflucht") to a sixteen-month jail term but served only twelve months, after which the four month balance was "suspended" for two years.

=== After school ===
In 1968 she passed her school final exams ("Abitur") which under other circumstances would have opened the way to a university-level education, at the same time, due to the subjects studied, earning a diploma in mechanical draftsmanship. Her school years had involved a "twin-track" path, which for her generation was not unusual. Although she was a member of the party-backed Young Pioneers, outside school she was also participating in religious studies. Later, despite her membership of the party's youth wing (FDJ), she was also involved with the church-sponsored "Young Community". Once she had finished with school and prison she undertook various low status jobs including waitressing and post office work. She also took "behind the scenes" work with the Dresden Puppet Theatre.

=== Theatre career ===
In 1970, thanks to the intervention of a Socialist Unity Party of Germany secretary, Klier was able to embark on a study course at the Theatre Academy in Leipzig, emerging with a degree in 1975. Next she received a contract at the Neue Bühne (theatre) in Senftenberg, a small town in the flat countryside north of Dresden, where she worked as an actress. Alongside the acting she also became increasingly interested in directing. That led to a four-year period of study at the Berlin Institute for Theater direction, for which she received her diploma in 1982. During the early 1980s she worked on productions of works by Fernando Arrabal (at Halle), Friedrich Dürrenmatt (at Bautzen), Carl Sternberg and John Millington Synge (both at Berlin).

In the 1970s Klier developed a growing interest in the cultural scene in Poland. That led her, almost unavoidably, to become increasingly critical of the reality of the communist states in central Europe. She tried to present her criticisms both politically and through her artistic work. The East German authorities were never receptive to criticism, however finely it might or might not be nuanced. Accordingly, at this time most of Klier's theatrical productions in East Germany were met with official suspicion or open criticism from the many channels employed by the party. Most of her productions found themselves rapidly cancelled or reconfigured ("uminszeniert"), so that relatively little survives of her own work. She was, necessarily, a member of the official "East German Theatrical Union" ("Theaterverband der DDR"), but found herself prevented from accepting invitations to work in theatres abroad – for instance in Hungary, the Netherlands and West Germany. Sources attribute this to the critical stance detected in much of her theatre work and to her involvement, from 1981, in the church-backed peace movement. Nevertheless, in 1984 she received a director's prize for the premier of "Legende vom Glück ohne Ende" ("Legends of Endless Joy") by Ulrich Plenzdorf at the Schwedt Theatre where she was working between 1982 and 1984. Despite, or possibly because of this accolade, she left the theatre that year, and in 1985, after resigning her party membership in April, she was served with a ban on further professional work.

=== Beyond theatre ===
Klier became increasingly involved with the Pankow Peace Circle in East Berlin during the early 1980s. The Pankow circle was, for many years, one of the more active and high-profile (but still localised) opposition groups cautiously emerging at the time. She was nevertheless internally conflicted because of her professional goals, and tried to integrate her artistic ambitions and her political goals. That was not always easy. In July 1981 she staged a small production for a church peace festival despite the threat of exclusion from the Institute for Theater direction (at which she was studying). Her preference for true facts also made the authorities nervous. In order to provide a factual basis for the social critique incorporated in and promoted by her artistic work, in 1983 Freya Klier began to make systematic enquiries of women with children about their home lives. She had herself been a single mother since the birth of Nadja, her daughter, in 1973: she knew from personal experience that there was a stark contrast between official propaganda and the actual condition of women in society. But her questionnaire based approach threatened a national taboo. Sociological or demographic studies were to be undertaken only by a small number of researchers who enjoyed the confidence of the party. Otherwise there was an ever-present danger that "right theory" might be undermined by "false empiricism".

=== Stephan Krawczyk ===
In February 1984 Klier met the songwriter Stephan Krawczyk. At the start of the 1980s he was a member of the still younger generation of artists whom the authorities confidently saw as the great hope for the nation's artistic future. He had won first prize at the 1981 National Song Festival and was, naturally, a party member. It was only in April 1985 that he resigned his party membership". Krawczyk had by this time become something of an iconic figure, especially for younger East German fans: later in 1985 he and Klier were both served with what amounted to a nationwide ban on professional work (Berufsverbot), which was linked with exclusion from the national "Theatrical Union" ("Theaterverband"). The authorities, with a characteristic absence of subtlety, sought to destroy Krawczyk's fan base, describing him as a "national enemy" ("Staatsfeind") and even as the "new Wolf Biermann".

=== Opposing dictatorship ===
Over the next twelve months the two of them worked together on a programme of dramatic pieces and prose readings critical of the "socialist" society. These received supportive responses from audiences of church groups and in community halls. The authorities responded by pressuring the church authorities to block their appearances. But as matters turned out there were more and more churches and community groups that continued to provide them with venues for their presentations. Klier and Krawczyk (who married in 1986) also found themselves deluged with official ordinances and injunctions.

During 1985, believing that she had identified the roots of the country's dictatorship in its education system, Klier began a new questionnaire-based research project into the East German education and training system. She conducted structured interviews with young people and, from 1986, with teachers, revealing a picture of a society riddled with dishonesty, depression and hopelessness. At the same time she found that the limits of the state's ideological power to influence had been reached, and that most young people of the 80s generation – if only inwardly – resisted the party's preposterous claims for the society over which it presided. Klier's researches were written up and presented early in 1990 in her book "Lüg Vaterland. Erziehung in der DDR" (loosely: "Lie, Fatherland: Education in East Germany"), the publication of which excited much attention during a critical year in East German history.

While Klier and Krawczyk were still in East Germany she communicated the results of her researches in Samizdat publications, and incorporated them into presentations critical of the social system that she continued to give in churches or private homes. The Ministry for State Security (Stasi) subjected them both to a programme of intense monitoring, identified in their files as "Operation Sinus" ("OV Sinus"). As a result of Stasi interventions it became increasingly difficult to organise presentations. Their car was tampered with several times: on at least one occasion the brake cable on one side was cut. Krawczyk experience a nerve gas attack as he was opening the car door. In addition to conventional harassment techniques Klier and Krawczyk were subjected to the ministry's infamous Psychological Degradation ("Zersetzung") tactics which were, as intended, psychologically damaging. Nevertheless, unlike her sixteen-year-old self, Freya Klier was now determined to stay the course and not to abandon East Germany.

In October 1986 Klier was a co-founder of the "Solidarity Church", an opposition group that sought to create a network across the country that took a critical position in respect of the one- party dictatorship, and she became a member of its co-ordination committee. She was nevertheless not without her own criticisms of it. Her personal experiences made her all too conscious of the shortage of that "solidarity" which the group purported to represent, and she called for more radical thought and action. Her contribution was more individualistic and less "collegiate" than that of many of the opposition activists in the build-up to the so-called "Peaceful Revolution". She always remained in touch with the more important of the opposition groups, however. Because her activities involved much travelling between the country's various regions, she was able to network intensively between opposition groups on a personal level.

In November 1987 Klier and Krawczyk sent a joint open letter to the party's top ideologist, Kurt Hager. Copies of this letter were widely distributed through the usual informal channels across East Germany and it was also published in the West German media. It was read out at a church concert on 9 November 1987. The letter criticised social conditions in East Germany and called for extensive reforms. At the same time Klier and Krawczyk agreed together to take part in the annual mass parade held each year in January to honour Rosa Luxemburg and Karl Liebknecht, two pioneers of German Communism who had been assassinated during months of revolution that followed the First World War. The 69th anniversary of the killings was to be commemorated on 17 January 1988, a Sunday. It was an officially sanctioned and promoted celebration. However, Klier and Krawczyk intended to attend it in order to display banners of their own devising. The idea was to draw attention to their own work bans and to highlight more generally their criticisms of the East German social structure. However, at the last minute they learned that other dissident demonstrators had planned to use the event to highlight government refusal to permit them to emigrate to the west, an issue that had never gone away. It was anticipated that western television teams would attempt to report the demonstration, and in order to avoid the risk of "mixed messaging" Klier and Krawczyk decided to leave their own alternative banners at home.

Weeks in advance, and well informed as ever, the Ministry for State Security had made their own plans to deal with dissident disruption of the 17 January 1988 celebration. In a series of house arrests immediately before the event approximately 120 civil rights activists were arrested and held for (and in some cases beyond) the duration of the event. (Other sources give the number arrested as 160.) Those arrested included Vera Wollenberger, Herbert Mißlitz and Stephan Krawczyk. Some dissidents nevertheless did participate in the demonstration, and despite the best endeavours of Ministry for State Security officials, several "unauthorized" banners appears on international television reports. The one that resonated most widely used a quote from Rosa Luxemburg herself: "Freedom is always the freedom to think differently" ("Die Freiheit ist immer die Freiheit des Andersdenkenden").

Freya Klier, still at liberty, reacted to the arrests with an appeal, widely reported, to artists in West Germany that they should show solidarity with comrades in the east by not themselves performing in East Germany. A few days later there was another wave of arrests. Leading opposition figures targeted now included Regina and Wolfgang Templin, Werner Fischer, Bärbel Bohley, Ralf Hirsch and Freya Klier herself. East German media launched a reinvigorated defamation campaign against those detained, but in West Germany and from opposition groups in other Soviet sponsored states in central Europe there came various declarations of support and solidarity. Nevertheless, there were also certain West German politicians who placed on record their "understanding" for the measures taken.

=== Expulsion ===
Inside East Germany the arrests unleashed the largest wave of solidarity with political prisoners since 1953. That was not apparent to the detainees themselves, however, since the only lawyers to whom they were given access were some employed by the Stasi themselves. Not only did these lawyers fail to tell their clients what was going on "outside": they also assured their "clients" that no one "outside" was showing the slightest interest in their fate. Shortly afterwards the lawyer assigned to Freya Klier, Wolfgang Schnur, greatly surprised her when he went public with vehement criticism of his client. It was only some years later, when the Stasi files were opened up, that his role as a Stasi collaborator would become apparent.

In fact the demonstrations and the subsequent arrests were being discussed at the highest level. A Politburo meeting took place on Tuesday 2 February 1988. The government felt more insecure than many western commentators assumed at the time, faced with a growing surge of street protests at home and growing uncertainty over whether, in the era of Glasnost, the authorities could still rely on fraternal military support from the Soviet Union of the kind employed the last time total breakdown had threatened, back in 1953 (or more recently, in Czechoslovakia, in 1968). Applying a strategy of damage limitation the Politburo decided to expel the imprisoned dissidents to the west. As presented to media by the government lawyer Wolfgang Vogel, this meant that all the detainees would be released, including those in the Stasi's special Hohenschönhausen jail facing treason charges, and each one could freely choose whether he or she wished to be released in the east or in the west.

Threatened with long years of imprisonment, Klier and Krawczyk agreed to expulsion from East Germany. Most (though not all) of the other dissidents arrested at the same time, each subjected to their own differing sets of pressures and conditions, were persuaded to reach the same conclusion. However, in the west Klier and Krawczyk were the most "high-profile" of the dissidents expelled. All the expelled dissidents stated that one way or another they had been forced to agree to expulsion. On arriving in the west Klier's first public action was arrange for her lawyer to read a sixteen line prepared statement to the television cameras stressing that she and Krawcyk had not left their country voluntarily, and were keen to return home as soon as possible. There were nevertheless accusations of betrayal from a number of "left-wing" East German dissidents left behind. A few days later Klier and Krawczyk gave an interview to Der Spiegel setting out their situation and some of the background to it more fully, and describing the treatment to which they had been subjected following their arrest. They repeated in the strongest possible terms their insistence that there had been nothing voluntary about their sudden appearance in the west.

There were many church representatives and others, committed to a "softly softly" approach to trying to bring Glasnost to East Germany, who criticised the decision by Klier and Krawczyk to encourage publicity for their situation. However, neither Klier nor Krawczyk had, in recent years, shown much interest in "low-profile" activism. In the dissident congregations and meetings in East Germany there is reason to believe that the events that followed the 17 January 1988 demonstration, and the publicity they attracted, served only to increase pressure on the state authorities and to hasten the regime's demise and thereby the return of democracy after not quite 58 years of one-party dictatorship.

=== Life in the west ===
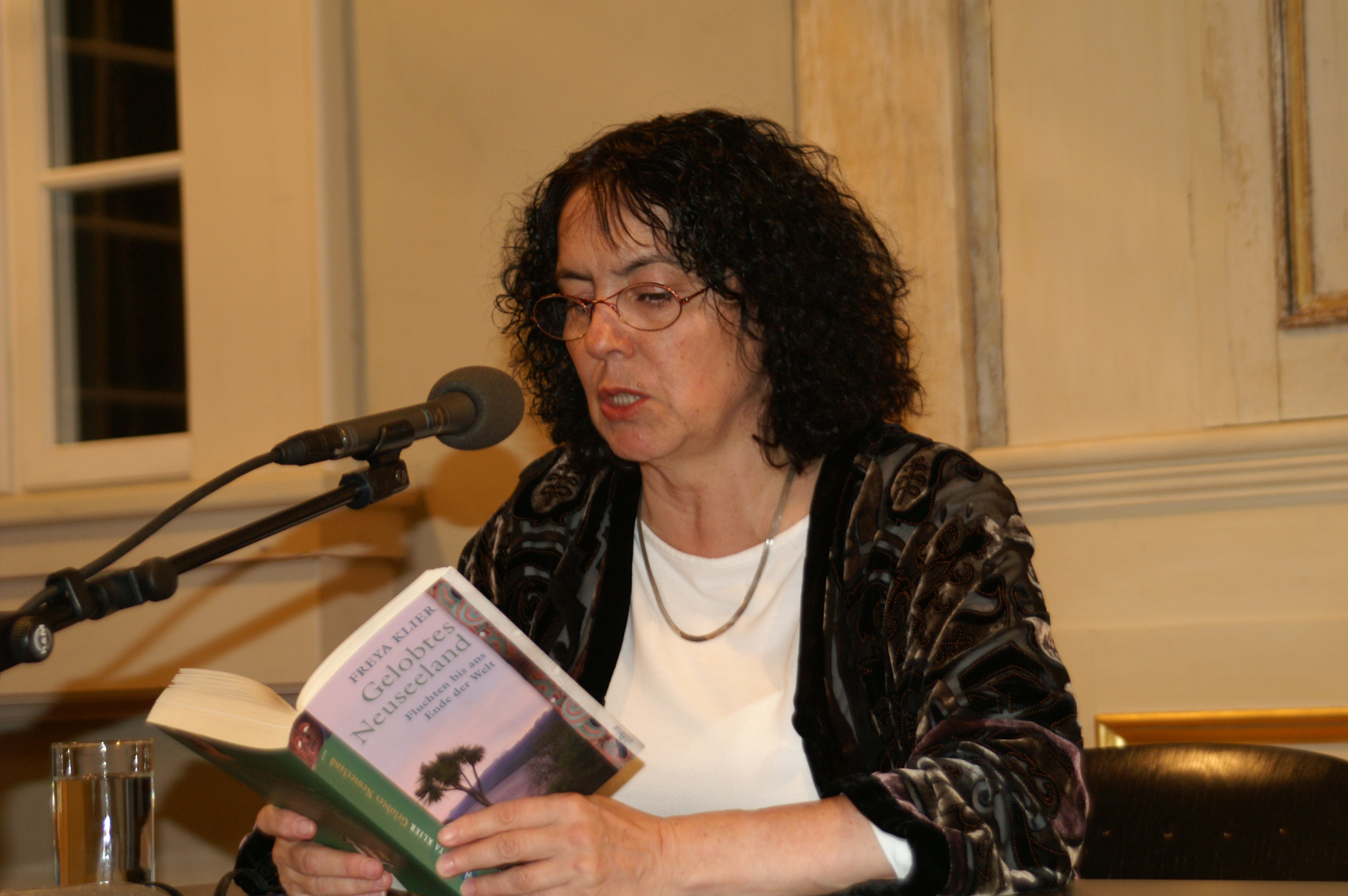
Klier in 2008 at the "Kleine Synagoge" (former small synagogue) in Erfurt, reading from her book "Gelobtes Neuseeland"

Freya Klier settled in West Berlin. Two years later Berlin was reunified in the wider context of the reunification process. Her marriage to Stephan Krawczyk lasted only till 1992. Today she lives as a freelance author, stage director and film maker. She ranges widely across political topics, but the East German dictatorship, along with the Nazi dictatorship that preceded it, feature prominently among her themes. She also retains a role as a political activist, working in political education and making regular presentations in schools. In 1996 she was a founding instigator of the Bürgerbüro initiative in Berlin which provides advice and support for surviving victims of East German's one-party dictatorship. She remains active in the movement which also provides support for her own research projects.

Since 2006, she has been a leading member of the P.E.N. international organisation for German-language authors abroad ("Deutscher PEN-Club im Exil"). Within the organisation, since 2006 she has headed up the "Writers in Prison" group.

== Family ==
Freya Klier's daughter, Nadja Klier, has achieved notability on her own account as a Berlin-based photographer and filmmaker.

== Output (selection) ==
=== Books ===
- Abreiß-Kalender – Ein deutsch-deutsches Tagebuch München: Kindler, 1988; 2. Aufl. München: Droemer-Knaur, 1989, ISBN 3-463-40101-0.
- Lüg Vaterland. Erziehung in der DDR München: Kindler, München 1990, ISBN 3-463-40134-7.
- Die DDR-Deutschen und die Fremden. Essay. In: Hans Eichel (Hrsg.): Hass & Gewalt – Halt! Brovi-Konzepte, Frankfurt am Main 1994, ISBN 3-930904-01-2. 55–59.pdf horch-und-guck.info (PDF; 43 kB; 5 Seiten) In: Horch und Guck, Heft 18, 1/1996.
- Die Kaninchen von Ravensbrück. Medizinische Versuche an Frauen in der NS-Zeit. 2nd edition. Droemer Knaur, München 1995, ISBN 3-426-77162-4. – on the Nazi criminal Karl Gebhardt.
- Penetrante Verwandte. Ullstein, Frankfurt am Main ISBN 3-548-33212-9.
- Verschleppt ans Ende der Welt. Ullstein, Frankfurt am Main ISBN 3-548-33236-6.
- Wir Brüder und Schwestern. Ullstein, Frankfurt am Main 2000 ISBN 3-548-36338-5.
- Gelobtes Neuseeland. Flucht deutscher Juden ans Ende der Welt. Aufbau, Berlin 2006 ISBN 3-7466-8145-6. (English translation: Promised New Zealand: Fleeing Nazi Persecution. Otago University Press, 2009 ISBN 9781877372766.)
- Oskar Brüsewitz. Leben und Tod eines mutigen DDR-Pfarrers. Bürgerbüro, Berlin 2004, ISBN 3-00-013746-7; 3., unveränderte Auflage bei: Polymathes, Leipzig 2013, ISBN 978-3-942657-08-2.
- Michael Gartenschläger. Kampf gegen Mauer und Stacheldraht. Bürgerbüro, Berlin, 2009, ISBN 978-3-00-027999-7.
- Wie schmeckte die DDR? Evangelische Verlagsanstalt, Leipzig 2010, ISBN 978-3-374-02754-5.
- Wir letzten Kinder Ostpreußens: Zeugen einer vergessenen Generation. Verlag Herder, Freiburg 2014, ISBN 978-3-451-30704-1.
- Die Oderberger Straße (co-written with Nadja Klier). be.bra verlag, Berlin 2017, ISBN 978-3-89809-140-4.

=== Films ===
- Verschleppt ans Ende der Welt – Dokumentarfilm 1993
- Johanna, eine Dresdner Ballade – Dokumentarfilm 1996
- Das kurze Leben des Robert Bialek – Dokumentarfilm 1997
- Die Odyssee der Anja Lundholm – Dokumentarfilm 1998
- Flucht mit dem Moskau-Paris-Express – Dokumentarfilm 2001
- Die Vergessenen. Tod, wo andere Urlaub machen – Dokumentarfilm 2011
- Wir wollen freie Menschen sein! Volksaufstand 1953 – Dokumentarfilm 2013

=== Stage presentation ===
- Schwarzer Rotgold – premier 1991 in "East" Berlin

=== Essays ===
- Links – eine Denkfalle SFB
- Im Takt des Fortschritts SFB
- Berlin ist nicht Bonn SFB 1999
- Wir müssen ja jetzt Westen sein SFB
- Die dritten Deutschen SFB
- Deutschland in der Schieflage SWR
- Gesichter des 17. Juni SFB 2003
- Der lila Drache und das Märchen von der schönen DDR WELT 2008
