= Hans-Joachim Veen =

German political scientist

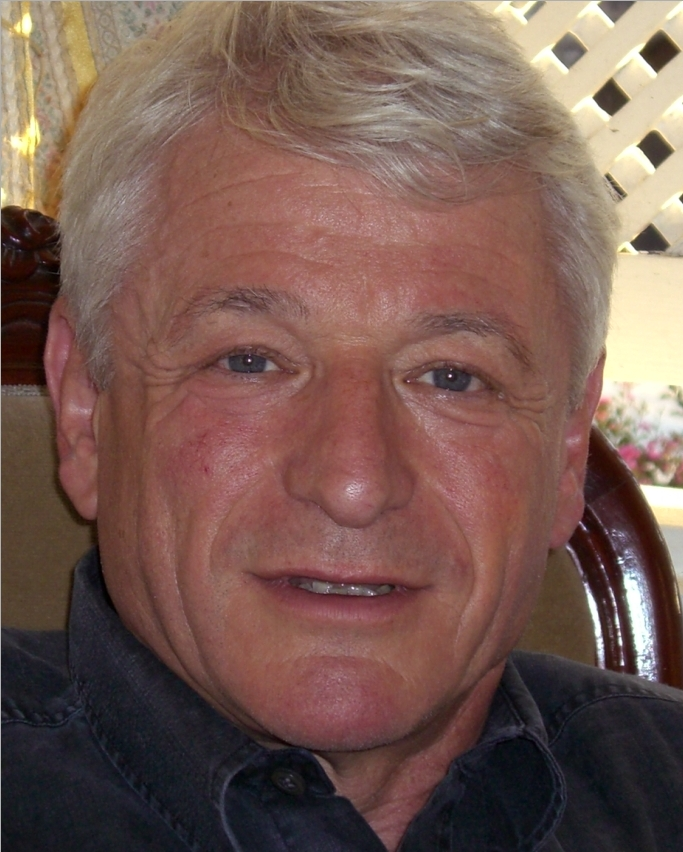
Hans-Joachim Veen

Hans-Joachim Veen (born 29 August 1944) is a German political scientist. He is the former director of research at the Konrad Adenauer Foundation, head of the scientific advisory committee to the Stasi Records Agency, and an honorary professor at the University of Trier.

== Early life, military service, and education ==
Veen was born in Strasbourg and took his Abitur in Bremen. He then served for two years with Reconnaissance Battalion 3 at Lüneburg. He has the rank of a full colonel (res.) and served as commander of Tank Battalion 524 in Lingen. His last reserve training was served as chief of staff of German Armed Forces Command USA and Canada in Reston, Virginia.

Following his military service, he studied political science, public law and history at the University of Hamburg and the University of Freiburg, earning a D.Phil. in 1976.

== Career ==
From 1983 to 1999 he worked as director of research at the Konrad Adenauer Foundation. Since 2000 he has been head of the project "Democracy and political party development in eastern Europe" within the foundation.

In 1994/95 he served as an interim professor for comparative government studies at the University of Trier; he has since held the rank of honorary professor.

Since 2002 Veen has been Chairman of the board of the Stiftung Ettersberg in Weimar, a foundation for the comparative study of European dictatorships and their democratic transition.

From 2007 to 2009 Hans-Joachim Veen also served as a head of the Thuringian governmental committee for violence prevention. From 2009 to 2012 he moderated the History Network Thüringen, a committee dealing with coming to terms with the history of the SED regime. In 2008 he became head of the scientific council attached to the Stasi Records Agency; he was reelected head of the council on 21 January 2013.

In 1993 he was awarded the Bundesverdienstkreuz for his contributions to the development of political, economic and historical studies at the universities of the formerly East German states through a multi-year program for visiting professors that he initiated and organised.

== Personal life ==
Veen married Marliese Veen in 1971; they have two sons.
