= Wolfgang Schnur =

German politician and lawyer (1944–2016)

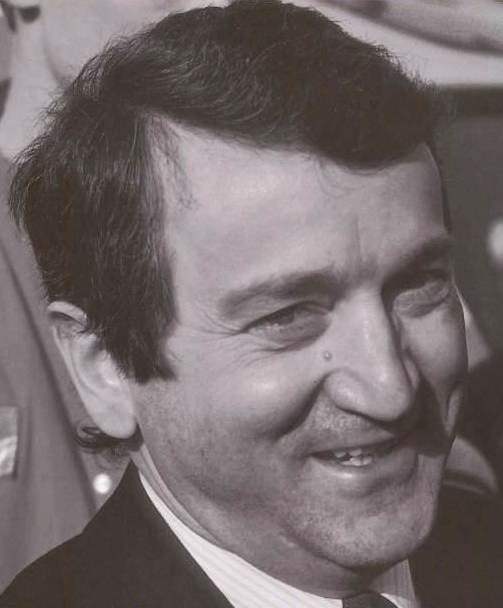
- Schnur in 1990

Leader of the Democratic Awakening
- In office 16 December 1989 – 14 March 1990
- General Secretary: Oswald Wutzke
- Preceded by: Position established
- Succeeded by: Rainer Eppelmann

Personal details
- Born: 8 June 1944 Stettin, Pomerania, Free State of Prussia, Nazi Germany (now Szczecin, Poland)
- Died: 16 January 2016 (aged 71) Vienna, Austria
- Party: Democratic Awakening (1989–1990)
- Children: 11
- Education: Humboldt University of Berlin
- Occupation: Politician; Lawyer; Stasi Agent

Wolfgang Schnur (8 June 1944 – 16 January 2016) was an East German civil rights lawyer and a longtime informer of the East German Stasi. He was closely involved with the Association of Evangelical Churches ("Bund der Evangelischen Kirchen" / BEK) and worked on many of the cases in which the BEK's leading figures were involved. He also became well networked, on more than one level, with the country's political establishment.

East Germany was a one-party dictatorship. During the 1970s and 1980s, the churches increasingly provided an outlet for alternative political views which, under a more decentralised system, would have been expressed through an effective multi-party parliamentary structure. Schnur was a founding member of the oppositional "Demokratischer Aufbruch" (DA, loosely "Democratic Awakening") in October 1989. He was one of the "new party" leadership team's most attractive and dynamic members: over the next few months there was talk of Wolfgang Schnur becoming prime minister in a new genuinely democratic German Democratic Republic. In February 1990 he appointed Angela Merkel as a press spokeswoman, the start of a remarkable political career. Wolfgang Schnur's political career had peaked, however. On 8 March 1990 he rejected allegations that he had been a Stasi informer. On 14 March 1990, less than a week before East Germany's first (and only) free parliamentary election, it was reported that Schnur had resigned from the presidency of Democratic Awakening. He was expelled from the party the next day.

== Life ==
=== Provenance and early years ===
Wolfgang Schnur was born in Stettin which at that time was in Germany. Stettin was a strategic port and as Schnur was born the city center and many of the surrounding residential and commercial districts were bombed by British bombers. Infection was rampant and very soon after his birth Wolfgang fell ill with Laryngeal Diphtheria. Wolfgang Schnur never knew his father: such vague and contradictory "facts" as have emerged about his paternity have been difficult to confirm and are likely to be, at least in part, incorrect. Wolfgang's mother, Erna Hermine Schnur had been born in Danzig on 24 July 1915. Schnur was her birth-name, so she was probably unmarried. At the time of Wolfgang's birth she was working as a domestic servant for a couple called "Piper". When, in the context of the ethnic cleansing of 1944/45, the Pipers moved to Lübeck, Erna Schnur went with them, leaving Wolfgang behind. She had already, in December 1941, given birth to Wolfgang's sister, Brigitte who had been taken from her mother within a few days and transferred to an orphanage. In the context of the chaos of the final part of the Second World War, records that may have been created concerning Wolfgang's paternity and first weeks of life do not survive, but it is known that once he had recovered from his Diphtheria he was moved directly from the hospital wing to the "Bergquell Children's Home" in Stettin, since "his mother did not want him".

By the time the Soviet army captured Stettin on 27 April 1945, inmates and patients from the children's home and the nearby children's hospital had been evacuated to the Island of Rügen a short distance to the west, where an abandoned barracks building was reassigned to accommodate them. The "Children's Barracks", as it became known, also accommodated the smaller infants. Meanwhile, following a redrawing of frontiers, Stettin had become part of Poland, ostensibly to compensate for the Polish lands now incorporated into the Soviet Union. Evacuation to the island meant that Schnur would grow up, classified as a "parentless child" ("elternloses Kind") in the part of Germany administered as the Soviet occupation zone. In April 1946 he was placed with foster parents at Natzevitz, a small village on the southern part of Rügen.

Martha and Rudolf Mummethei were so-called "new peasants", who had been allocated a parcel of land following the break-up by the military authorities of the great landed estates (and before the more long-lasting East German land reforms). Rudolf Mummethei had become a "milker" and Martha Mummethei, who before the war had worked as a domestic servant for one of the landowning families in the region, now ran the home and helped her husband with his agricultural work. Wolfgang spent his early childhood believing that Martha and Rudolf Mummethei were his parents. When he was five or six they carefully explained to him that they were not his "real parents", and that his real parents were "probably dead". Later Schnur would describe his shock at the revelation and also his anger that his foster parents had only told him the truth after the Children's Office of the local Welfare Department had intervened on several occasions, instructing them to do so. For the next ten years, he grew up believing himself a "full orphan", unaware that his mother was still alive. Despite his conflicted emotions, on learning that the Mummetheis were not his "real parents", Schnur had a mostly good relationship with his foster parents, who treated him "as their own". Files nevertheless refer to his having run away at least once, and having been removed from his foster parents home on several occasions, which Schnur later attributed to his foster mother's nervous illness on account of a bad nose fracture and resulting "substantial social difficulties". In many respects, Schnur's situation was not so different from that of many of his contemporaries. War had created many orphans.

In 1951 he was sent to the junior school at a village in the area called Seedorf. Interviewed sixty years later his former teacher, Horst Bürger, still recalled his deep interest in politics. He was a "good student" and engaged fully in the activities and trips of the Ernst Thälmann Pioneer Organisation and also stood out because of his contributions in school plays. He excelled in lessons and his teacher recommended, unusually in rural East Germany at this time, that he should be entered for the Abitur, which would have opened the way to university-level education. On 1 September 1959 he transferred to the senior school at Bergen auf Rügen in order to prepare for the exam.

=== Mother ===
At Christmas 1960 the sixteen-year-old Wolfgang Schnur discovered that he was not an orphan. His mother was alive and had been found living in the west.

The news came from Dr. Alfred Weckram, his former pediatrician at the little hospital in Bergen. The doctor also told him that as far back as 1946 his mother had posted a small "search advertisement" [in a newspaper]. The doctor showed him the "small ad". The doctor seems to have been operating on behalf of the East German tracing service. Schnur immediately became convinced that in the chaos of the final months of the war he and his mother had become separated against his mother's will. This is what he would write in an extensive autobiographical résumé that he provided to the Ministry for State Security much later, in March 1983. There could be no other explanation for the "search advertisement" from 1946. It was only much later that he learned from Erna Schnur's stepmother something of the difficulties that his mother had experienced during the National Socialist years. Erna Schnur was half Jewish and had herself spent the war years in Stettin, hidden by a succession of families in order to avoid being caught up in the Shoah. It was only with the arrival of the Red Army in April 1945 that she had been able to come out of hiding. (An explanation for her not having retrieved her child from the orphanage before leaving for Lübeck never emerged, however.)

By 1960 Erna Schnur had been living for fourteen years in Bad Homburg, near Frankfurt am Main. She was employed by the Waldkrankenhaus, a psychiatric hospital in the Köppern quarter of Friedrichsdorf, a couple of kilometers outside Homburg. Although she never married, she had told the tracing services in West Germany that the existence of her children should not be disclosed to her employers. In August 1961 (eight days before the sudden and unexpected erection of the Berlin Wall heralded a rapid intensification of east–west travel restrictions) Wolfgang Schnur booked himself time off work and set off excitedly for a joyful reunion with his mother, traveling via Berlin and passing through the Friedrichstraße passport control point without encountering any delays. Since Christmas mother and son had written to each other several times, but Wolfgang had not mentioned his plans for a visit. That would be a surprise. Since Christmas he had left school and embarked on an apprenticeship at the Stralsund shipyard. His school in Bergen had arranged the apprenticeship for him only after becoming convinced of his determination not to complete his academic course.

After crossing into West Berlin he stopped off at a Youth Camp where he was required to undergo a medical examination. A shadow in his lungs was identified. On 13 August 1961 the wall went up. On 23 August 1961 he was nevertheless able to leave the city, taking a flight from West Berlin to Giessen where he was accommodated at another Youth reception Camp, not far from his mother's home at Bad Homburg. When Wolfgang turned up, unannounced, at her front door, Erna Schur's reaction was not the one that her son had anticipated. There was no welcoming hug. She did not even invite him into her home. She was simply overwhelmed by the situation. She did, in fact, almost at once arrange for him to transfer from the Youth reception Camp in Giessen to an Internationaler Bund establishment in Homburg which specialised in preparing young refugees from East Germany for life in the west. Wolfgang was nevertheless desperately hurt that he had crossed the country in search of his long lost mother only to find himself an inmate of yet another institution. His relationship with his mother would never become close. Commentators have seen some of his more remarkable actions and character traits as evidence of a deeply seated search for an "alternative mother".

For the next few years, he stayed in the area. Between August 1961 and October 1962 he was able to support himself as a youth worker. The tasks were not so different from some of the activities in which he had been involved with the Young Pioneers. In October 1963 he was able to collect a western Middle School completion certificate. He was not unduly troubled by the political differences that had by now developed between east and west. There were people in charge who set the rules, and you did what you did within those rules. He was appointed, in May 1962, to the vice-presidency of a Youth Social Work forum in Hesse. In the longer term, he decided to build a career as a journalist, and he applied successfully for a traineeship with the Frankfurter Allgemeine Zeitung, which started in September 1962. The paper was keen to send him to East Berlin to gather material on politics, economics and sport. However, Schur was nervous about the idea, fearing (with good cause) that after his extended stay in the west he might find himself convicted of Escaping from the Republic ("Republikflucht"), a crime which under Paragraph 213 of the East German criminal code would normally lead to a prison sentence.

=== "Asylum" back home in the German Democratic Republic ===
At some stage Wolfgang Schur nevertheless decided to return to East Germany. He himself later explained that "there were two things that drew ... [him] ... back." One was that he badly missed his stepmother, whom he had neglected to tell about his plans when he had headed across to Bad Homburg, and the other was that in Oberursel he met up with a school teacher whom he identified, in the context of the times, as a Nazi. That may have been less than a total explanation, but it does appear that he could see no long-term future for himself in the west. On 21 October 1962 he crossed into the German Democratic Republic at the Wartha border crossing near Eisenach. As he had anticipated, the East German officials were unsure of how to deal with him. He was not a typical disillusioned westerner seeking a new life in the workers' and peasants' paradise. The question arose, as he had anticipated, of whether he might be charged with "Republikflucht". He was held at a detention centre in Eisenach while decisions were made about his future. There were questionnaires to be filled out. Then, after two days, he was permitted back into the country without further ado, and by the end of October 1962 he was back with his foster parents in Natzevitz. His foster mother welcomed him home with the immediate hug that his birth mother had not been able to provide. It was only later that various more intractable difficulties with the authorities, arising from his year in the west, became apparent.

In many ways, he had to start again. After intense investigations by the Ministry for State Security he was accepted under a conditional contract as a track construction assistant, working for the rail depot at Bergen. At the political and bureaucratic levels there was a powerful mutual suspicion between East and West Germany, and the authorities evidently thought that Schur might have been smuggled back into East Germany in order to spy for western intelligence. He himself was under intense surveillance from comrades looking for any signs that he might be a spy. After six months a back injury made it necessary for him to give up the labouring job on the railways, and in May 1963 he was assigned to an office job with the East German Trade Organisation, with which he remained till October 1966. Here the situation seemed more relaxed, and an older female comrade with a motherly touch took him in hand and showed him how to become a "good comrade". He soon worked out how to join the political mainstream and on 16 March 1965 his application to become a candidate for party membership was accepted and his name was added to the candidates list. He took on (unpaid) party work and became a local leader with the Free German Youth.

=== Free German Youth ===
Schnur's obvious intellectual ability and meticulous approach, combined with his determination to become a "good comrade" brought him to the attention of the authorities. His complicated childhood and relationship with his mother, along with questionable aspects of his year in the west, also opened up vulnerabilities which might turn out to be useful. He was headhunted to study Marxism–Leninism at the "Free German Youth Wilhelm Pieck Academy" ("Jugendhochschule Wilhelm Pieck" – housed in a lakeside villa which had been, in another time, the holiday home of Joseph Goebbels). The course commenced at the beginning of September 1965. By the end of October 1965 Schnur had withdrawn from it, ostensibly on health grounds. Ministry of State Security files disclose a more complicated reason. New information had come to the attention of FDJ officers concerning Schnur's time in the west when he had engaged in youth work in Oberursel. The Oberursel facility in which he had been based was believed – probably correctly – to be heavily infiltrated by US-Intelligence, and further enquiries failed to extinguish intensified security service suspicions about Schnur. The Ministry of State Security themselves had already investigated his background thoroughly and had already filled files with large amounts of information about his time in the west, but those details could not be disclosed in elaborate detail to the Free German Youth (FDJ) decision-takers who now simply asserted that no future FDJ official should have links to the west. And his mother actually lived in the west! Schnur was expelled from the FDJ which he himself always claimed to regard as a career catastrophe for his subsequent career prospects. The Ministry of State Security tended to take a more strategic view, however, and seem to have regarded the entire incident as no more than a setback. Their fundamental faith in Wolfgang Schnur's long term potential – of which Schnur himself still knew nothing – was not affected.

In the aftermath of the FDJ affair, Schnur's candidacy for party membership was set aside on 28 February 1966, which he himself regarded as a major punishment (ein "hohes Strafmaß"). Meanwhile, it turns out that he had already been providing information to Ministry of State Security ("Stasi") officers, possibly without even knowing that they were Stasi officers, in connection with "Operation Bussard". No surviving files describing Operation Bussard have been located and Schnur himself, when asked about it decades later, said he could not remember what it was all about. There is no equivalent uncertainty, however, concerning his signature, dated 4 June 1965, on the declaration agreeing to become a Stasi informer. The document includes his code name, "GI Torsten". (Note: The document of the time uses the term "Geheimer Informant" ("Secret Informant"). The term used since 1968, and frequently applied retrospectively in sources to earlier years, is "Inoffizieller Mitarbeiter" (loosely, "Unofficial [co-]worker") By now he was 21. Exceptionally ambitious personally and financially, he recognised that he still had much "catching up" to do if he ever wanted to be a "good comrade", following his year in the west. He chose the name Torsten because a friend at work had a son called Torsten.

=== Stasi ===
The meeting at which he had signed up had taken place in a "secret apartment" ("konspirative Wohnung") near his home somewhere on Rügen, and this apartment, made available by the elderly lady who lived in it and who was herself an IM, now became his Stasi contact location. His first operation - probably a test mission - announced itself in the form of a letter from a young woman in Hamburg who wanted to visit him on the island. He had originally met Marlies Bähr at a large FDJ east-west social event in East Berlin the previous year. Schnur wrote back just four days later, recommending a holiday apartment which the municipality rented out to holiday makers. When he reported back to his Stasi handler it was agreed that the authorities would arrange the Miss Bähr's holiday themselves, and a room was booked for her at a little guest-house in Binz. Marlies Bähr arrived and a "holiday romance" ensued although, as his handling officer's surviving report approvingly attests, his genuine infatuation did nothing to compromise the excellent quality of Schnur's "espionage" work with respect to the young women. Over several days, as they danced, walked, flirted and just sat and talked, he subjected her to a sustained and intensive interrogation which, it appears, she barely noticed, in order to evaluate her true feelings and motives in respect of political matters and her personal life. Officers who read his detailed reports of the social interaction between himself and Marlies compared him to an "uninterrupted continually running tape recorder". That quality is apparent from the level of detail in a succession of Stasi files covering Schnur's activity over the next 24 years. Marlies was a student at the (US-funded) Free University of Berlin. His Stasi handlers became satisfied that she was not an American spy, and they shared Schnur's conviction that she must have picked up a large amount of knowledge about East German students who had emigrated – after 1961 "escaped" – to the west. The opportunities were all too obvious. Marlies was just the person to convince "Torsten" about the superior freedoms available in the west, and to help him plan and organise an "escape to the west" on his own account. Marlies Bähr was of limited interest to the Stasi as a potential intelligence source, but as a possible route into the closed circle of FU students around Detlef Girrmann (and others) helping often desperate East German citizens escape to the west, she could be invaluable.

At the end of her holiday, Marlies Bähr was more unsure than ever of what to make of "Torsten". As he reported to his handlers, she had made clear that she had no wish to engage with him in any more discussions about politics. Possibly he had "gone too far". But she was happy to tell him what she knew about escaping from East Germany to the west. She knew it was very dangerous. To do it he must be 150% sure that it was what he wanted. She had heard of East German escaping via Turkish ships in the Mediterranean after managing to get themselves included on government-sponsored Mediterranean youth-holidays on an East German ship. But she very strongly counselled him to do everything he could to find a legal route for any escape to the west before involving himself with the illegal methods. "Torsten" was not successful in getting her to disclose whatever she knew about the "Fluchthelfer" (escape helpers) among her university contemporaries. He reported that she knew "nothing concrete" about that side of things. But Schnur's handlers were more interested in using Marlies to enable "Torsten" himself to become involved with the "traffickers". She introduced him to "Hendrik", a student at Technische Universität Berlin to whom "Torsten" confided that he still feared arrest, following the unpleasantnesses at the "Free German Youth Wilhelm Pieck Academy". Hendrik did not want to know the details, but he was indignant on Torsten's behalf and understood the point at once. He knew a man.... Somehow "Torsten" very soon broke off contact with both Marlies and Hendrik, but the exceptionally comprehensive and detailed nature of the reports of his various meetings that Schnur submitted to his handlers continued to impress. His progress may well still have been held up through suspicions generated on account of his connections with the west, but he was nevertheless given a succession of further assignments to investigate and report back. On his home base at Rügen he was employed as an "omni-directional radar" to identify and investigate possibly negative or hostile elements among the young people on the holiday island.

=== The church community and a first marriage ===
A possibly more important assignment came up in April 1966 when "Torsten" was sent to join the youth club attached to the Protestant church at Binzen. The Stasi knew that the church's youth community included conscript soldiers and so-called "Bausoldaten" (non-combatant conscientious objector soldiers) from the NVA barracks at Prora. The "Bausoldaten" were viewed with particular suspicion. "Torsten" reported back with characteristic detail and precision on conversations at the weekly "tea and sandwiches" functions held by the pastor – even in weeks when the pastor himself was unable to attend – enabling handlers to identify potential trouble makers and, indeed, potential informants among the coming generation. It was through the church youth community that "Torsten" met Bärbel, who on 1 July 1966 became the first of his several wives. Bärbel came to the marriage with a son from a previous relationship. She herself was part of a large and "interesting" extended family. The couple's three children together – believed to be the first three of Wolfgang Schnur's eleven children – had been born by 1974. Schnur was a restless and frequently absent father: childcare responsibilities fell almost exclusively to Bärbel. It was also Bärbel who "led him to faith": Wolfgang Schnur became a Christian.

=== Back to school ===
In June 1967 Schnur returned to his studies for the Abitur (secondary school final exam) in order, belatedly, to work towards a university degree. By now he had abandoned the idea of obtaining a degree in journalism, favouring instead "Wirtschaftsrecht" (loosely, "Economic Law") he undertook his Abitur course locally, through the "Kreisvolkshochschule" (large secondary school) in Putbus. As before, his unconventional past created suspicions on the part of local party officials which resulted in difficulties in securing a study place, but behind the scenes contacts via the Ministry of State Security in the end enabled those difficulties to be overcome. Then, in the Autumn term of 1967, he commenced his student career, studying law at (East) Berlin University. According to the relevant ministry files he had "organised his student place himself". His plan was to focus on his studies in order to become a full-time informer. A few weeks after becoming a student he informed his Stasi handlers that once he had his degree his future would undoubtedly involve a posting in the west, a plan which the responsible officer felt was at best "opaque". He was also beginning to lose a little of the trust he had formerly enjoyed from his handlers, after it was discovered from routine postal intercepts that "Torsten" still (or again) had on-going contacts with Marlies Bähr in Hamburg, but had neglected to mention the fact in his reports. One of her postcards to him was also copied for the Stasi files on him.

Despite an apparent cooling in the relationship with his Stasi handlers, "Torsten" was offered and accepted a mission to report "everything" about the youth community in Binzen. He was nevertheless encountering difficulties on obtaining law-related work because he had not been able to join the party and because the record of his expulsion from the FDJ remained on the files. He asked the ministry contacts for help, but it is not clear how much effort they were able or willing to exert on his behalf at this point. Nevertheless, with a family to support, he had no choice but to try and find a job at which he could work in parallel with his university law studies. Eventually, he accepted a job as a justiciar (legal officer) with a newly created abattoir ("VEB-Fleischkombinate") in Stralsund. He was appalled by the absence of effective political-ideological education taking place at the business, which is fully reflected in his reports to his handlers of the time. He seems to have become depressed and disillusioned at this time, and in around 1968, which was the year of the crushing of the Prague Spring, he ended his habit of regularly completing and submitting application forms for party membership. Much of his energy was necessarily devoted to his studies, but he was also spending more time involving himself with the Protestant church community at Binzen, and providing his handlers with the relevant reports.

=== The lawyer ===
Despite the distractions and difficulties, in 1973 Wolfgang Schnur finally received his law degree after what had become, by this stage, a "distance-learning" based degree course. He now supported himself as a lawyer, based in Binzen. In 1978 he opened his own legal practice in Rostock, along the coast on the mainland, to the west. This suggests that he was at the time well regarded by his handlers, since permission for a lawyer to set up in what amounted to a form of private practice was a "rare privilege" in the German Democratic Republic.

It was partly as a result of his engagement with the Protestant church community at Binzen since the 1960s that Schnur had established and sustained contacts with many former so-called "Bausoldaten", people conscripted for military service who served in non-combatant units for reasons of conscience. Some of these later went on to become high-profile artistic figures whose commitment to environmental protection and human rights brought them into serious conflict with the government. As a civil rights lawyer Wolfgang Schnur's clients included the songwriters Stephan Krawczyk and Freya Klier, along with civil rights activists such as Bärbel Bohley und Vera Wollenberger and many other less well remembered "dissidents" and objectors to the government's military service requirements. He also became one of East Germany's best-known church representatives, both as a lawyer and in the public sphere more generally. He was a member of the synod of the Evangelical Lutheran Church for Mecklenburg, and served for at least one term as vice-president of the national Evangelical Church synod.

Alongside his intellectual horsepower, endless energy and sheer ambition, there were those who thought they noticed something else a little odd about the church's increasingly high-profile lawyer. Bishop Horst Gienke of Greifswald described him as a "man with a devilish look" ("... als einen Mann mit diabolischem Blick"). His self-evident travel privileges, granted by the authorities, and his habit of driving a western car, were hard to miss. No one seems to have asked why a lawyer specialising in political dissidents could finance such a lifestyle. East Germans had learned not to ask questions.

=== The networker ===
Schnur always had a close working relationship with Horst Kasner, who had worked in Templin (near Berlin) for many years as head of the Evangelical Church's pastoral college for Berlin-Brandenburg. Kasner was a shrewd if cautious man who took his own decisions and who was seen as an important intermediary between the church nationally and the state. He was a member of the influential Weißensee Working Circle of senior churchmen and was viewed by the state authorities as one of the more progressive (i.e. pro-party church leaders. The working relationship between Schnur and Kasner extended to friendship between their families, and it placed Schnur for many years close to the critical fulcrum of East Germany's church-state relations.

A regular interlocutor for Schnur and Kasner in the context of the church's on-going conversations with the party was the lawyer-churchman Clemens de Maizière (1906–1980), whose son Lothar later became East German prime minister. Clemens de Maizière was both a member of the Berlin-Brandenburg synod and a leading member of the East German CDU (party). On the government side the principal interlocutor for all three men was the State Secretary for Church Affairs. Between 1979 and 1988 that office was held by Klaus Gysi.

=== The political pioneer ===
On 1 October 1989 Wolfgang Schnur was a co-founder of "Demokratischer Aufbruch" (DA, loosely "Democratic Awakening"), an organisation with many of the characteristics of a western-style political party. As the professional lawyer among the group it had fallen to Schnur to draft the party constitution, taking every possible care to try and ensure that DA could not legitimately be declared illegal. At the founding conference, held in East Berlin, he was elected "party president" – effectively the leader of the operation. The movement had grown out of various increasingly politicised elements from within the evangelical churches, and there are indications that one reason for Schnur's election was that he was "not a theologian", unlike Rainer Eppelmann who was also keen to take on the position, and indeed did so in succession to Schnur half a year later.

In December 1989, as the political changes gathered pace, Schnur was also an early participant at the National Round Table meetings ("Zentraler Runder Tisch"). Ominously, however, he withdrew from these meetings on 27 December 1989 following allegations (which he refuted) of "Corruption and abuse of office". As right-left tensions within DA were resolved in favour of the "moderate right", several of the founding leaders such as Friedrich Schorlemmer moved away, while the larger part that remained joined with the (East German) DSU and the (East German) CDU to form the Alliance for Germany, formally launched on 6 February 1990, with Schnur one of the co-founders. Wolfgang Schnur had for some months been spoken of as a "future East German prime minister" and at this point he retained his leading position in the enlarged party.

=== Nemesis ===
At the beginning of 1990 it was not clear to most people whether the path on which East Germany had embarked would lead to reunification. One person with rather fewer doubts on the matter was the West German chancellor, Helmut Kohl. He had already held in-depth discussions on the issues involved with Mikhail Gorbachev. Kohl held the view that Schnur would make an excellent East German prime minister through the run-up to German reunification. During the campaign for the East German General election scheduled for March 1990, Kohl even took time out to join Schnur on campaign trail. On 5 March 1990 Schnur's ambitions met with a setback, after disclosures surfaced concerning the nature, duration and extent of his activities as a Stasi informer. The information came from the carefully maintained and indexed files held by the Stasi at their Rostock office. The following afternoon, the Rostock regional party executives of DA were informed of the discoveries. They immediately sent an express courier with the news to Magdeburg, where Schnur was campaigning with Kohl. The following day, the Rostock branch confirmed to the DA national executive members Rainer Eppelmann, Oswald Wutzke and Fred Ebeling that there could be absolutely no doubt as to the authenticity of the files which had, during the intervening two days, been subjected to further scrutiny. That evening they confronted Schnur. Schnur's immediate reaction was that the files could not possibly refer to him, since he had never been a Stasi informer. He was thinking about taking legal action. Schnur rejected the allegations again the next day, 8 March 1990, then he collapsed and was taken to hospital. The same afternoon, his friend and party colleague Eppelmann read out a statement to the press defending Schnur and insisting that Schnur had never worked for the Stasi. He read out Schnur's own forthright denial. (Note: "Ich erkläre hiermit verbindlich, ich habe nie für die Staatssicherheit gearbeitet, ich habe nie einen Orden des Ministeriums für Staatssicherheit empfangen.") Eppelmann knew by then about the files in Rostock, but still could not believe them.

Sources differ over just how much evidence had been found against Schnur. Biographer Alexander Kobylinski, who interviewed Schnur at very great length, claimed 12,000 pages in 39 Stasi files. (Koblinski noted that two more of the Stasi files listed had disappeared.) After 1990, millions of Stasi files became accessible to researchers, causing widespread amazement and horror over the detailed extent of the close surveillance under which East Germans lived, but at the time of Schnur's unmasking it was not clear why so much detailed information should suddenly have become available to the DA regional leadership in Rostock, less than two weeks before the election which seemed more than likely to be followed by the appointment of Schnur as East Germany's prime minister. The Stasi offices in Rostock had been occupied and sealed since 5 December 1989 by a local "Citizens' Committee" determined to ensure no further destruction of Stasi files. The actual discovery of Schnur's name in the Stasi records came about on account of a "clumsy misfiling" as a result of which a reference to the succession of military awards awarded to "the lawyer Wolfgang Schnur", and a couple of unexpected references to "meetings", turned up in papers being reviewed by an investigation committee working for the Citizens' Committee in Rostock on the supervision of the winding-up of the Rostock regional Stasi administrative office. During the closing months of 1989, Schnur had presumably reported back with precision and insight on his participation in the Round Table meetings, but his own contributions must nevertheless have been particularly upsetting for senior Stasi officers. An important responsibility for the Round Table participants involved supervision of the winding-up of the detested Stasi. As a trained lawyer and as the representative at meetings of Democratic Awakening, it was principally Schnur who complained about the inadequacy of that supervision. Even after his twenty-five years as an exceptionally well-placed and productive Stasi informer, for his handlers and senior officers' doubts persisted as to which team Wolfgang Schnur was really part of.

Once the news broke, the first person to whom Schnur confessed his Stasi past, albeit only orally, was Helmut Kohl. From Kohl's own autobiography it appears that he may already have been aware of the breaking news, which he received from his own sources. Kohl immediately conferred with his party colleagues Eberhard Diepgen and Bernd Neumann, who handled the West German CDU's relationship with DA. Kohl's team were keen to establish whether Schnur really had been working for the Stasi for many years, or whether he was simply the victim of a high-level personal undermining programme, of the kind in which the Stasi were known to specialise, launched by political opponents. CDU Party Secretary Volker Rühe thought immediately of Stasi "dirty tricks". Once, however, it had been established that the reports were true, Neumann and others in Kohl's team were keen to obtain Schnur's confession in writing as a matter of critical urgency, in order to minimise the risk that on-going doubts or some subsequent retraction might undermine the electoral prospects of the CDU's eastern ally, the Alliance for Germany.

On 9 March 1990, nine days ahead of the election, Kohl was campaigning in Rostock on behalf of his Alliance for Germany allies. It was noticed that the DA leader was unexpectedly absent from Kohl's side. It was explained that reports had been received from his party that the previous day Schnur had collapsed. Over the previous couple of days, reports of the discoveries in the Rostock Stasi appeared in the press, along with Schnur's denials. On 12 March, the DA leaders issued a statement to the press focusing on Schur's health: it was still "very bad". Visited the previous day in hospital, his face had worn a "glazed look": he was affected by heavy medication. But he had nevertheless given a declaration concerning his personal honour with great "mental clarity". The matter of the Rostock files and a detailed follow-up report appearing in Der Spiegel could only be cleared up by Schnur himself. Meanwhile, the East German prosecutor's office had already confirmed that a preliminary investigation against persons unknown had already been launched in respect of an alleged defamation.

Schnur resigned the leadership of Democratic Awakening on 13 March 1990. Apparently unaware of this development, his party colleague Horst Schulz was addressing an election rally in Erfurt. Schulz told his 2,000 listeners that the allegations against party leader Schnur were a slander and a lie, meticulously prepared by Stasi experts over a long period for "disclosure" directly ahead of the election. He demonstrated this by holding up what he said was an almost perfect "Stasi file" on the poet Goethe, produced by a Citizens Committee and DA in the space of just 24 hours. (Note: Goethe died in 1832.) On 15 March 1990, it was reported that the DA party executive had excluded Schnur from the party at the same time as they had appointed Eppelmann as the new party leader. The election duly took place three days later. DA did not perform well, but the Alliance for Germany, the three-way grouping of which they were a part, received 48% of the votes cast.

=== After politics ===
In October 1990 the two German states were formally reunited. In 1991 Wolfgang Schnur set up a law firm in Berlin. In 1993, however, he lost his practicing certificate on account of his "unsuitability" ("Unwürdigkeit") and for "Mandantenverrat" (serious breach of clients' trust). The ban arose out of accusations (which Schnur always denied) that in his reports to his Stasi handlers he had breached his duty of professional confidentiality towards clients, especially dissidents planning their escape from East Germany and those objecting to military service on grounds of conscience. It was confirmed by the High Court the next year.

On 15 March 1996 he was convicted at the Berlin District Court on two counts under §241a of the Penal Code. §241a was added to the West German law in 1951 and was deemed to have applied across the reunified country even in respect of events predating reunification. It defines as a criminal offence the action of placing someone else in danger of political persecution. The case against Schnur involved Stephan Krawczyk and his wife Freya Klier, a dissident couple who were high-profile East German authors who had experienced difficulties with the authorities before 1990. It culminated with the pair being expelled to the west in 1988. Schnur was their lawyer and a longtime friend whom they trusted. The court determined that Schnur had breached §241a when he reported to his Stasi handlers his suspicion that Stephan Krawczyk had been in contact with western television companies. He was further convicted because the court determined that he had reported to the Stasi his suspicion that author Freya Klier had been hiding in her house a manuscript that was critical of conditions in the German Democratic Republic. Schnur was sentenced to a total of twelve months in jail, but the sentence was suspended on the condition that he should comply with the conditions of a probation order. Schnur appealed the judgement, citing an intervening decision in another case to argue that §241a had not applied in the German Democratic Republic at the time of the events giving rise to the charges, but on 27 November 1996 the court rejected his appeal.

The circumstances of the §241a case gave rise to a further conviction in September 1997, this time accompanied by a DM 1,320 fine. Schnur was found guilty of having disrespected a judge whom he had accused of antisemitic acts in the course of heated pleadings. Between 1990 and 2000, there were also criminal cases involving allegations of financial misconduct. By the turn of the century, Schnur was living in diminished circumstances with his latest wife and their two-year-old son in a poorly maintained "grey villa" in the Hessenwinkel district on the eastern edge of Berlin. At this stage he was describing himself as an investments and projects consultant, although according to one unsympathetic journalist his only client was a family in Niedergörsdorf who were committed to creating Europe's largest museum of agricultural machinery. The consultancy was not proving lucrative. He had acquired the house in which he lived under complicated circumstances before reunification. More recently he had sold it to a cousin, from whom he was renting it, but he was still by now badly indebted. His new wife had been deeply shocked when he had told her about his former double life.

Most recently Schnur lived impoverished and withdrawn from the public in Vienna, Austria. He died of prostate cancer on January 16, 2016, in Wilhelminenspital.
