= 1987 West German federal election =

- 25 January 1987

All 497 seats in the Bundestag (Note: As well as 22 non-voting delegates for West Berlin, elected by the West Berlin Legislature.) 249 seats needed for a majority
- Registered: 45,327,982 ▲2.8%
- Turnout: 38,225,294 (84.3%) ▼4.8 pp
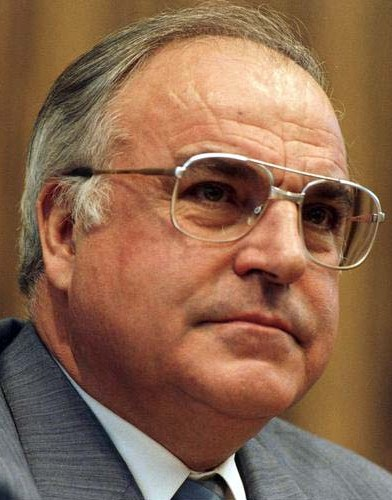

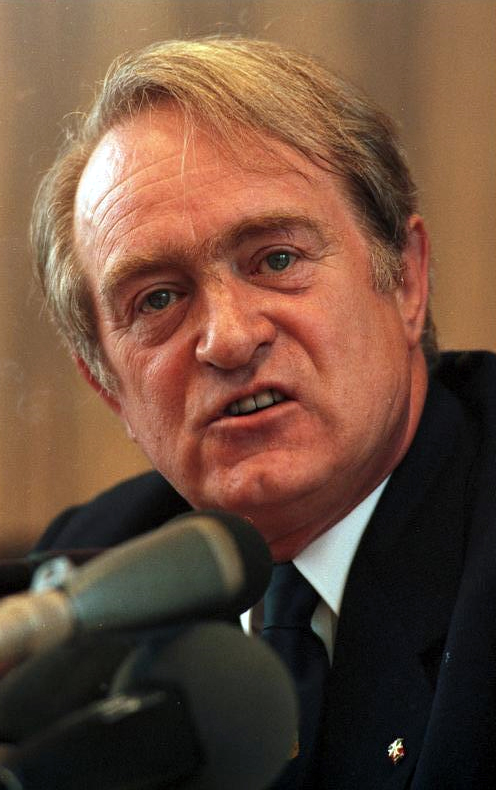

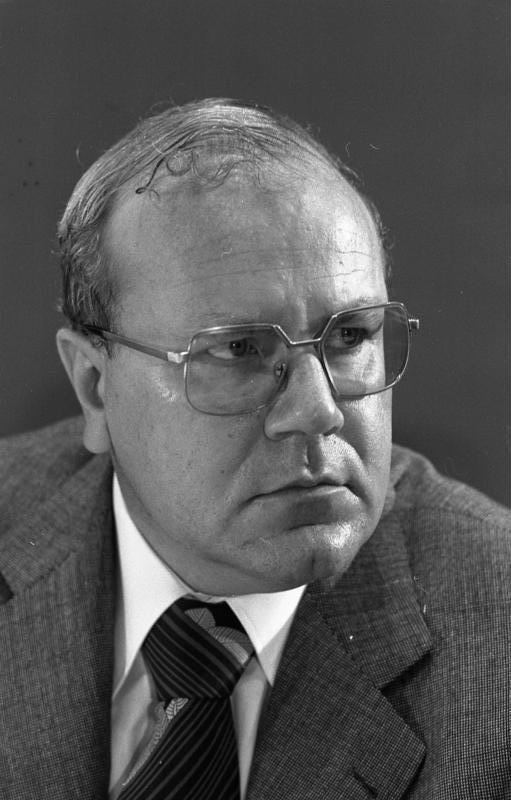

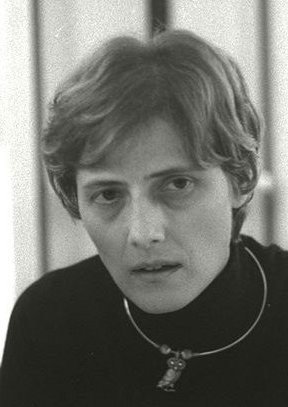
	First party	Second party
Candidate	Helmut Kohl	Johannes Rau
Party	CDU/CSU	SPD
Last election	48.8%, 244 seats	38.2%, 193 seats
Seats won	223 (Note: As well as 11 non-voting delegates for West Berlin.)	186 (Note: As well as 7 non-voting delegates for West Berlin.)
Seat change	▼21	▼7
Popular vote	16,761,572	14,025,763
Percentage	44.3%	37.0%
Swing	▼4.5 pp	▼1.2 pp
	Third party	Fourth party
Candidate	Martin Bangemann	Petra Kelly
Party	FDP	Greens
Last election	6.9%, 34 seats	5.6%, 27 seats
Seats won	46 (Note: As well as 2 non-voting delegates for West Berlin.)	42 (Note: As well as 2 non-voting delegates for West Berlin.)
Seat change	▲12	▲15
Popular vote	3,440,911	3,126,256
Percentage	9.1%	8.3%
Swing	▲2.2 pp	▲2.7 pp
- The left side shows constituency winners of the election by their party colours. The right side shows party list winners of the election for the additional members by their party colours.
Government before election
Second Kohl cabinet
CDU/CSU-FDP
Government after election
Third Kohl cabinet
CDU/CSU-FDP

A federal election was held in West Germany on 25 January 1987 to elect the members of the 11th Bundestag. This was the last federal election held in West Germany before German reunification.

== Issues and campaign ==
The SPD nominated Johannes Rau, their vice chairman and the Minister-President of North Rhine-Westphalia, as their candidate for Chancellor. However, the SPD suffered from internal divisions and competition with the Greens. It was also unclear as to how they would form a government, as the Greens were divided over whether to take part in governments.

One of the major issues in this election was the environment, after the Chernobyl disaster and other accidents.

== Results ==
Party	Party-list			Constituency			Seats			
Party	Votes	%	Seats	Votes	%	Seats	Elected	West Berlin	Total	+/–
Social Democratic Party	14,025,763	37.04	107	14,787,953	39.18	79	186	7	193	–9
Christian Democratic Union	13,045,745	34.45	50	14,168,527	37.54	124	174	11	185	–17
Christian Social Union	3,715,827	9.81	4	3,859,244	10.23	45	49	0	49	–4
Free Democratic Party	3,440,911	9.09	46	1,760,496	4.66	0	46	2	48	+13
The Greens	3,126,256	8.26	42	2,649,459	7.02	0	42	2	44	+16
National Democratic Party	227,054	0.60	0	182,880	0.48	0	0	0	0	0
Ecological Democratic Party	109,152	0.29	0	40,765	0.11	0	0	0	0	0
The Women	62,904	0.17	0				0	0	0	New
Bavaria Party	26,367	0.07	0	8,024	0.02	0	0	0	0	0
Responsible Citizens	24,630	0.07	0	611	0.00	0	0	0	0	New
Patriots for Germany	22,732	0.06	0	27,352	0.07	0	0	0	0	New
Centre Party	19,035	0.05	0	4,020	0.01	0	0	0	0	New
Marxist–Leninist Party of Germany	13,422	0.04	0	596	0.00	0	0	0	0	New
Christian Bavarian People's Party	5,282	0.01	0	741	0.00	0	0	0	0	0
All Social Insurants and Pensioners	1,834	0.00	0	3,151	0.01	0	0	0	0	New
Free German Workers' Party	405	0.00	0	349	0.00	0	0	0	0	New
Humanist Party				788	0.00	0	0	0	0	New
Solidarity				754	0.00	0	0	0	0	New
Independent Workers' Party				352	0.00	0	0	0	0	New
Family Party				130	0.00	0	0	0	0	New
Free Social Union				110	0.00	0	0	0	0	New
Independents and voter groups				246,511	0.65	0	0	0	0	0
Total	37,867,319	100.00	249	37,742,813	100.00	248	497	22	519	–1
Valid votes	37,867,319	99.06		37,742,813	98.74					
Invalid/blank votes	357,975	0.94		482,481	1.26					
Total votes	38,225,294	100.00		38,225,294	100.00					
Registered voters/turnout	45,327,982	84.33		45,327,982	84.33					
Source: Bundeswahlleiter

Seat results – SPD in red, Greens in green, FDP in yellow, CDU/CSU in black

=== Results by state ===
==== Constituency seats ====
State	Total seats	Seats won		
State	Total seats	CDU	SPD	CSU
Baden-Württemberg	37	36	1	
Bavaria	45			45
Bremen	3		3	
Hamburg	7	2	5	
Hesse	22	14	8	
Lower Saxony	31	18	13	
North Rhine-Westphalia	71	33	38	
Rhineland-Palatinate	16	11	5	
Saarland	5	2	3	
Schleswig-Holstein	11	8	3	
Total	248	124	79	45

==== List seats ====
State	Total seats	Seats won				
State	Total seats	SPD	CDU	FDP	Grüne	CSU
Baden-Württemberg	37	21		9	7	
Bavaria	42	24		7	7	4
Bremen	4		2	1	1	
Hamburg	7	1	3	1	2	
Hesse	23	10	5	4	4	
Lower Saxony	32	13	8	6	5	
North Rhine-Westphalia	72	24	25	12	11	
Rhineland-Palatinate	16	7	4	3	2	
Saarland	5	1	2	1	1	
Schleswig-Holstein	11	6	1	2	2	
Total	249	107	50	46	42	4

== Aftermath ==
The coalition between the CDU/CSU and the FDP returned to government, with Helmut Kohl as Chancellor. The Greens came into parliament for the second time and seemed to be established on federal level.

=== Co-option of East German Volkskammer after reunification ===
Co-optation of Volkskammer members into the Bundestag
- 3 October 1990
- All 663 seats in the Bundestag; 332 seats needed for a majority
Party	Leader	Seats	+/–
CDU	Helmut Kohl	248	+63
CSU	Theodor Waigel	49	0
SPD	Hans-Jochen Vogel	226	+40
FDP	Otto Graf Lambsdorff	57	+11
Greens	Petra Kelly	51	+9
PDS	Gregor Gysi	23	New
DSU	Hansjoachim Walther	8	New
United Left	Thomas Klein	1	New
This lists parties that won seats. See the complete results below.
Government before	Government after election
Third Kohl cabinet CDU/CSU-FDP	Third Kohl cabinet CDU/CSU/DSU–FDP

In order to determine the composition of the East German representatives in the Bundestag between German reunification and the first post-reunification elections in December 1990, the results of the 1990 East German general election were recounted, using the new states of Germany as constituencies. This was possible since the original election results were declared on the Kreis level, and the states were re-established by simply amalgamating Kreise together. The results in each Kreis forming a state were summed up to determine the statewide result. The recount fixed the number of Volkskammer members from each party who would be co-opted into the Bundestag elected in 1987. The 22 Non-voting representatives of West Berlin already became full voting members on 8 June 1990, in advance of unification.

=== Co-optation results ===
==== Votes ====
State	CDU		SPD		PDS		DSU		BFD		B90		DBD		G–UFV		DA		NDPD		DFD		VL		Others	
Brandenburg	615,975	33.6	548,912	29.9	335,822	18.3	61,001	3.3	86,188	4.7	59,945	3.3	51,678	2.8	39,359	2.1	13,869	0.8	8,392	0.5	2,763	0.2	3,637	0.2	7,763	0.4
East Berlin	161,960	18.3	308,833	34.8	267,834	30.2	19,733	2.2	26,591	3.0	56,078	6.3	4,065	0.5	23,565	2.7	9,032	1.0	1,558	0.2	–	–	2,863	0.3	4,070	0.4
Mecklenburg-Vorpommern	486,038	36.3	313,020	23.4	305,123	22.8	31,947	2.4	47,981	3.6	31,678	2.4	65,422	4.9	26,785	2.0	8,152	0.6	6,849	0.5	5,193	0.4	2,218	0.2	7,161	0.5
Saxony	1,506,832	43.4	522,580	15.1	472,037	13.6	454,298	13.1	197,644	5.7	102,987	3.0	65,274	1.9	60,667	1.7	32,282	0.9	13,711	0.4	13,955	0.4	5,348	0.2	23,739	0.7
Saxony-Anhalt	933,276	44.5	496,606	23.7	293,605	14.0	50,393	2.4	161,580	7.7	46,255	2.2	37,696	1.8	36,978	1.8	12,650	0.6	7,351	0.4	9,402	0.4	3,410	0.2	6,053	0.3
Thuringia	1,006,517	52.5	335,583	17.5	217,960	11.4	110,358	5.8	88,951	4.6	39,131	2.0	27,091	1.4	39,578	2.1	30,161	1.6	6,431	0.3	6,879	0.4	2,866	0.1	3,987	0.2

==== Seats ====
State		Total seats	Seats won						
State		Total seats	CDU	SPD	PDS	FDP	DSU	B90/G	VL
Brandenburg		22	8	7	4	1	1	1	
Berlin	Total	33	13	11	2	3		1	1
Berlin	East	11	2	4	2	1		1	1
Berlin	West	22	11	7		2		2	
Mecklenburg-Vorpommern		17	7	4	4	1		1	
Saxony		43	20	7	6	3	5	2	
Saxony-Anhalt		27	12	7	4	2	1	1	
Thuringia		24	14	4	3	1	1	1	
Total (East Germany Only)		144	63	33	23	9	8	7	1
Total (Including West Berlin)		166	74	40	23	11	8	9	1

== Sources ==
- The Federal Returning Officer
- Psephos
