= Rainer Eppelmann =

German politician

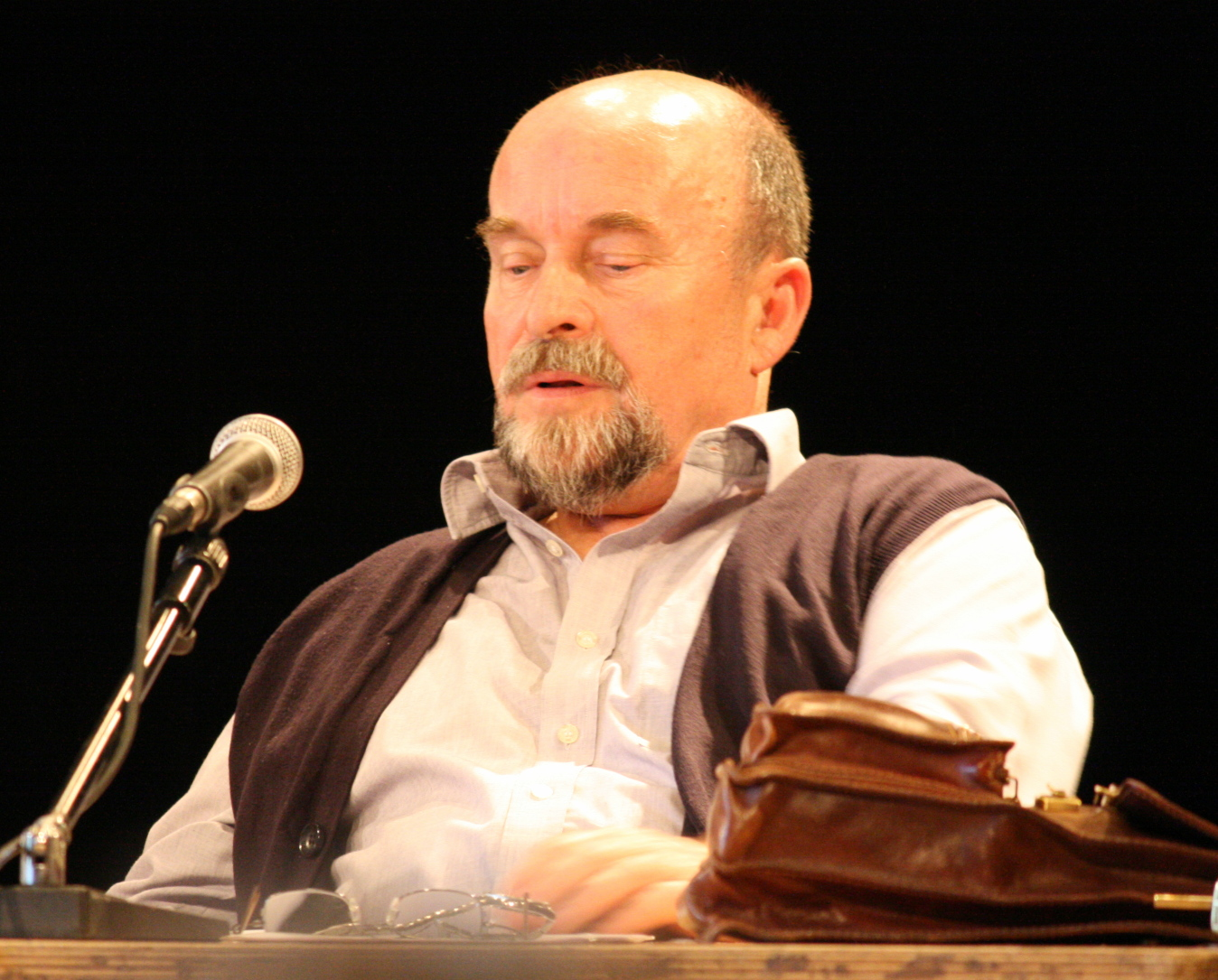
- Eppelmann in 2008

Minister for Disarmament and Defence of East Germany
- In office 12 April 1990 – 2 October 1990
- Minister-President: Lothar de Maizière
- Preceded by: Theodor Hoffmann (as Ministers of Defence)
- Succeeded by: Gerhard Stoltenberg (as Ministers of Defence)

Minister without Portfolio
- In office 5 February 1990 – 12 April 1990 Serving with Tatjana Böhm, Sebastian Pflugbeil, Gerd Poppe, Walter Romberg, Klaus Schlüter, Wolfgang Ullmann, Matthias Platzeck
- Chairman of the Council of Ministers: Hans Modrow
- Preceded by: Position established
- Succeeded by: Position abolished

Member of the Bundestag for Brandenburg (Fürstenwalde – Strausberg – Seelow; 1990–1994)
- In office 10 November 1994 – 18 October 2005
- Preceded by: multi-member district
- Succeeded by: multi-member district
- In office 20 December 1990 – 10 November 1994
- Preceded by: Constituency established
- Succeeded by: Mathias Schubert

Member of the Volkskammer for Berlin
- In office 5 April 1990 – 2 October 1990
- Preceded by: Constituency established
- Succeeded by: Constituency abolished

Personal details
- Born: 12 February 1943 (age 83) Berlin, Nazi Germany (now Germany)
- Party: Christian Democratic Union (1990–)
- Other political affiliations: Christian Democratic Union (East) (1990); Democratic Awakening (1989–1990)
- Spouse: Eva-Maria Strauth (m. 1969; div. 1988)
- Children: 5
- Education: Paulinum

Rainer Eppelmann (German pronunciation) (born 12 February 1943 in Berlin), is a German politician. Known for his opposition in the German Democratic Republic, he became Minister for Disarmament and Defense in the last cabinet. He is now a member of the CDU.

== Early life and education ==
The erection of the Berlin Wall forced him to drop out of the school he had attended in West Berlin in 1961 and he was forbidden from taking his Abitur exams in the East for refusing to join the Free German Youth movement.

He then worked as an assistant to a roofer before doing a job training for bricklayer. He is a pacifist. In 1966, for refusing both regular service and Bausoldat (construction soldier in the National People's Army), he was brutally beaten and arrested by the Stasi, and put into prison for eight months where he was starved, tortured, abused and interrogated.

Later, he studied Theology at the theological school in Berlin, an education he completed in 1974 with two exams. He then worked as a Lutheran pastor in at Samariterkirche in Berlin-Friedrichshain and took part in the opposition, such as being the editor of samizdat publications with Thomas Welz. It has been claimed that during this period Eppelmann had contact with the CIA.

== Political career ==
In 1990, Eppelmann was one of the founding fathers of the Democratic Awakening, becoming its president. Thus, he took an active part in the round table of 1990, preparing the German reunification. From 18 March 1990 to 2 October 1990 (when it ceased to exist) he was a member of the Volkskammer. He was Minister for Disarmament and Defence of East Germany in the cabinet of Hans Modrow and later in the one of Lothar de Maizière. When the Democratic Awakening joined the Christian Democratic Union in August 1990, Eppelmann became a member and, later, the assisting chairman of the worker's division of the CDU, the CDA.

He was a member of the Bundestag from 1990 to 2005 for the Christian Democratic Union. Then, he was chairman of the commission that coped with the history of the German Democratic Republic.

Eppelmann's trademark is his "Berliner Schnauze", an idiom that is supposed to bring him close to the people of Berlin.

== Personal life ==
Eppelmann is married and has five children. In April 2023, he was one of the 22 guests at the ceremony in which former Chancellor Angela Merkel was decorated with the Grand Cross of the Order of Merit for special achievement by President Frank-Walter Steinmeier at Schloss Bellevue in Berlin.
