= Hans-Wilhelm Ebeling =

German politician (1934–2021)

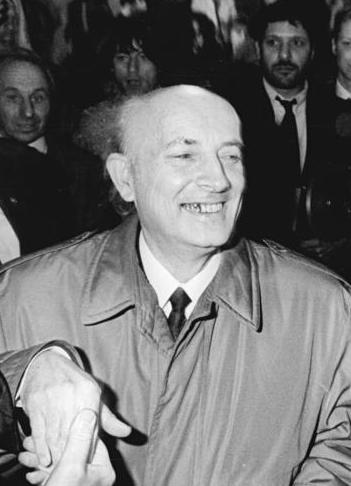
- Ebeling in 1990

Leader of the German Social Union
- In office 20 January 1990 – 30 June 1990
- First Deputy: Hansjoachim Walther
- General Secretary: Peter-Michael Diestel
- Preceded by: Position established
- Succeeded by: Hansjoachim Walther

Minister for Economic Cooperation
- In office 12 April 1990 – 2 October 1990
- Minister-President: Lothar de Maizière
- Preceded by: Position established
- Succeeded by: Position abolished

Member of the Volkskammer for Leipzig
- In office 5 April 1990 – 2 October 1990
- Preceded by: Constituency established
- Succeeded by: Constituency abolished

Personal details
- Born: Hans-Wilhelm Ebeling; 15 January 1934 Parchim, Mecklenburg, Nazi Germany (now Mecklenburg-Vorpommern, Germany)
- Died: 11 November 2021 (aged 87) Leipzig, Saxony, Germany
- Party: Christian Democratic Union (1990–1991)
- Other political affiliations: German Social Union (1990); Christlich-soziale Partei Deutschlands (1989–1990)
- Education: Karl-Marx-University Leipzig; Dresden University of Technology
- Occupation: Politician; Pastor; Locksmith

Hans-Wilhelm Ebeling (15 January 1934 – 11 November 2021) was a German Lutheran clergyman and politician.

He served as a pastor at the Leipzig St. Thomas Church from 1976 to 1990. During the German Democratic Republic (GDR) transition period, he was the leader of the German Social Union (DSU) from January to May 1990 and, from April 1990 until German reunification in October 1990, the first and last Minister for Economic Cooperation in the cabinet of Lothar de Maizière.

== Life and career ==
=== Early career ===
Ebeling's father was an officer with the Army High Command and was killed in 1945 near Danzig. A distant maternal ancestor was the poet Ernst Moritz Arndt.

He grew up in Greifswald, and after 1945 in Calau in Lower Lusatia. After completing his high school education in Forst (Lausitz), he briefly worked as a foundryman at the Eisenhüttenkombinat Ost and then completed a locksmith apprenticeship at the Reichsbahnausbesserungswerk Cottbus from 1952 to 1954.

=== East German pastor ===
From 1954 to 1957, Ebeling studied mechanical engineering at the Dresden University of Technology and from 1957 to 1962, he studied theology at the Karl-Marx-University Leipzig. After obtaining a diploma in theology, he served as a vicar in Vetschau/Spreewald until 1964 and as a pastor in Lieberose from 1964 to 1976.

He became the pastor at the St. Thomas Church in Leipzig from 1976 onwards.

He was considered particularly loyal to the GDR's authorities and was cited by Stasi officers as an example of seamless cooperation with the state. While peace prayers were held in other churches in the city from 1982, the Thomaskirche remained closed to the protest movement until 9 October 1989. Encouraged by Christian Führer to show solidarity with other pastors, he tried to prevent the upcoming Monday prayer service in early October 1989. Only under significant pressure, with the church council of the Thomaskirche forcing a vote, did he open the church doors on 9 October.

=== Reunified Germany ===
Until his early retirement in 1991, he worked for the Konrad-Adenauer Foundation, where he evaluated projects in Angola and Vietnam. In November 1998, Ebeling was awarded the Cross of Merit 1st Class of the Federal Republic of Germany. He lived in the Leipzig district of Gundorf in his later years. He had four children.

== Political career ==
=== East Germany ===
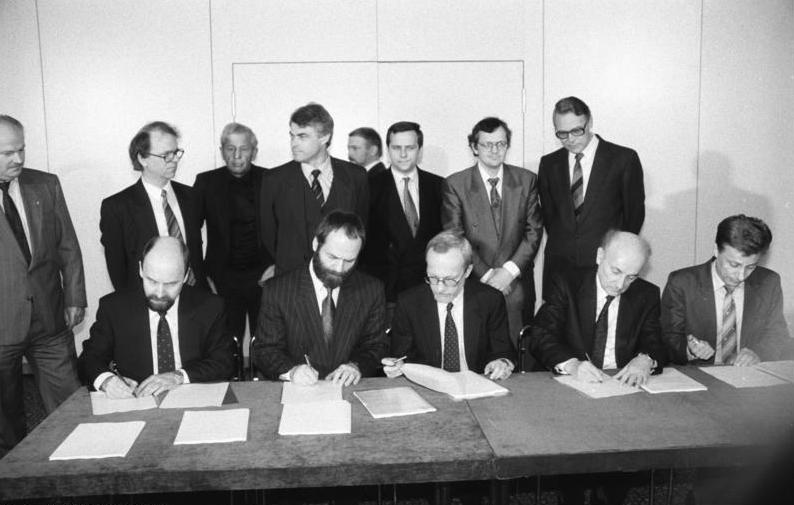
Ebeling (first row, second from the right) in April 1990 signing the coalition agreement.

During the peaceful revolution in the GDR, he, along with Peter-Michael Diestel, co-founded the Christian-Social Party of Germany (CSPD) in December 1989. On 20 January 1990, it merged with ten other small conservative and Christian parties to form the German Social Union (DSU), a right-wing party modelled after the Bavarian CSU, with Ebeling serving as its first leader. The CSU financially supported it in hopes of establishing a presence outside of Bavaria.

He led the DSU into an alliance with the East German CDU and the Democratic Awakening, forming the Alliance for Germany, which won the first and final free election on 18 March 1990. Ebeling was co-lead candidate of his party alongside Hansjoachim Walther.

Ebeling was a member of the Volkskammer until the end of the GDR and German reunification. In the de Maizière government, Ebeling served as Minister for Economic Cooperation from April to October. The GDR previously did not have a central institution for economic cooperation and economic aid. Ebeling appeared at the UN General Assembly on 25 April 1990.

Feeling the representative role would fit him best, Ebeling initially wanted to become President of East Germany, but de Maizière adamantly refused. de Maizière initially did not want to include him in cabinet at all, doing so only after pressure from Helmut Kohl.

When his successor as DSU chairman, Hansjoachim Walther, shifted the party further to the right, Ebeling left the DSU on 2 July 1990, and joined the CDU, which he left in 1991.
