= Hansjoachim Walther =

German politician (1939–2005)

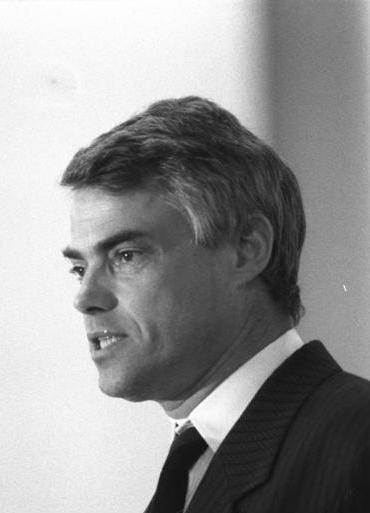
- Walther in 1990

Leader of the German Social Union
- In office 30 June 1990 – 25 May 1991
- First Deputy: Jürgen Schwarz
- General Secretary: Alexander Achminow
- Preceded by: Hans-Wilhelm Ebeling
- Succeeded by: Reinhard Keller

Minister for Special Affairs
- In office 3 October 1990 – 17 January 1991 Serving with Hans Klein, Rudolf Seiters, Lothar de Maizière, Sabine Bergmann-Pohl, Günther Krause, Rainer Ortleb
- Chancellor: Helmut Kohl
- Preceded by: Office established
- Succeeded by: Office abolished

Leader of the German Social Union in the Volkskammer
- In office March 1990 – 2 October 1990
- Whips: Timo Backofen; Joachim Schmiele
- Deputy: Karsten Degner
- Preceded by: Position established
- Succeeded by: Alfred Dregger (as Leader of the CDU/CSU/DSU in the Bundestag)
Parliamentary constituencies
Member of the Bundestag for Volkskammer
In office 3 October 1990 – 20 December 1990
Preceded by	Constituency established
Succeeded by	Constituency abolished
Member of the Volkskammer for Suhl
In office 5 April 1990 – 2 October 1990
Preceded by	Constituency established
Succeeded by	Constituency abolished

Personal details
- Born: Hansjoachim Walther; 16 December 1939 Bütow, Province of Pomerania, Free State of Prussia, Nazi Germany (now Bytów, Poland)
- Died: 17 January 2005 (aged 65) Stützerbach, Thuringia, Germany
- Party: Christian Democratic Union (1993–2005)
- Other political affiliations: German Social Union (1990–1991); German Forum Party (1989–1990)
- Education: TU Dresden; Technische Universität Ilmenau
- Occupation: Politician; Mathematician; Academic

Hansjoachim Walther (16 December 1939 – 17 January 2005) was a German politician and mathematician.

He was leader of the German Social Union, a right-wing party modelled after the Bavarian CSU, during the Wende, serving as their parliamentary leader in the Volkskammer. After German reunification, he was co-opted to the Bundestag and appointed as Minister for Special Affairs.

== Personal life and death ==
Walther was born in 1939 in Bütow, Farther Pomerania, now Bytów, Poland to Joachim Walther and Erika Dobat, two civil servants. His family fled to Zeitz in 1945. In East Germany, he first completed an apprenticeship as Spitzendreher, a metalworking profession, before studying mathematics at the Dresden University of Technology. Walther achieved a doctorate in 1966. Thereafter until his death, he followed a career as an academic at the Ilmenau University of Technology.

Walther, who is the namesake of the Walther graph, died in 2005 of a heart attack during a soccer game.

== Political career ==
=== East Germany ===
Walther about the principles of the DSU

"The first is Germany as soon as possible. The second, the social market economy here as quickly as possible. And thirdly, we want to be a union, a union of free states. We want our old structures, our state structures, back."

Hansjoachim Walther

During the Peaceful Revolution, Walther first cofounded the German Forum Party in 1989, before cofounding the newly established German Social Union in 1990. The DSU was a right-wing party modelled after the Bavarian CSU, which financially supported it in hopes of establishing a presence outside of Bavaria.

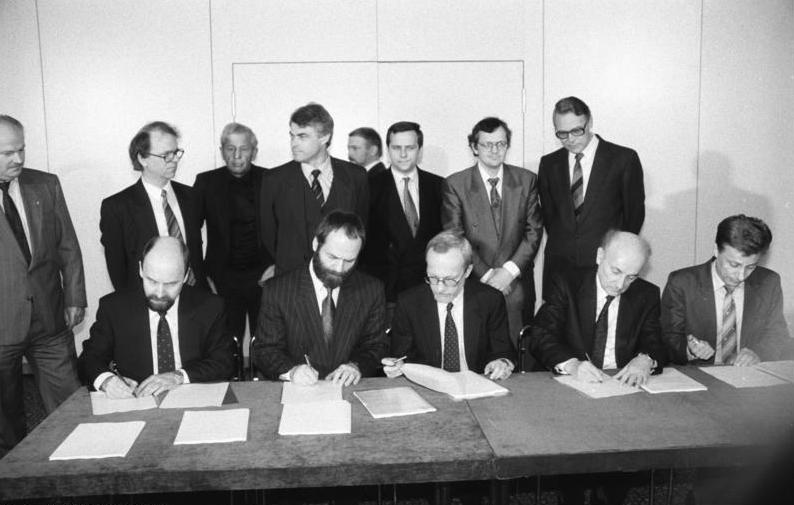
Walther (second row, left of center) in April 1990 at the signing of the coalition agreement

In the 1990 Volkskammer election, Walther was the lead candidate of his party. He was elected to the Volkskammer for Suhl. The German Social Union, as part of the victorious Alliance for Germany, entered government, Walther playing a role as leader of the DSU parliamentary group. In the Volkskammer, the DSU under his leadership advocated for an immediate German reunification, even as early as August. The DSU also, successfully, proposed the removal of the GDR's national emblem from all public buildings.

In June 1990, Walther, previously deputy leader since the founding in January, was elected leader of the German Social Union. His ascension to the leadership meant a further right-wing drift of the party, causing some, most notably former leader and Minister for Economic Cooperation Hans-Wilhelm Ebeling as well as Deputy Minister-President of East Germany Peter-Michael Diestel, to leave the party in protest.

Walther faced many problems as leader of the DSU. The party suffered from electoral decline, was disorganized, both in terms of the internal organisation, most notably membership records, of the party and the Volkskammer group; for example, the DSU held the deputy chairmanship of the Volkskammer's powerful Budget Committee of Bundestag, but the DSU swapped out its chairman two times in just half a year. The Volkskammer group under Walther also frequently clashed with its coalition partners, most notably on the issue of the date of German reunification; all other parties in the coalition discussed much later dates and had to resort to parliamentary maneuvering to shut down the DSU's frequent proposals of an immediate reunification.

The internal turmoil of the party also stoked conflict; ministers Ebeling and Diestel had left the DSU (both joining the CDU shortly thereafter), but stayed on as ministers. Walther called for their removal, but to no avail, meaning the DSU was technically part of the de Maizière cabinet, but without representation.

In the case of Deputy Minister-President Diestel, the DSU Volkskammer group had already tried to oust him back in May due to Diestel's alleged softness in dealing with employees that were former Stasi agents. Walther even proclaimed to have a successor to Diestel ready, but refused to name him.

=== Germany ===
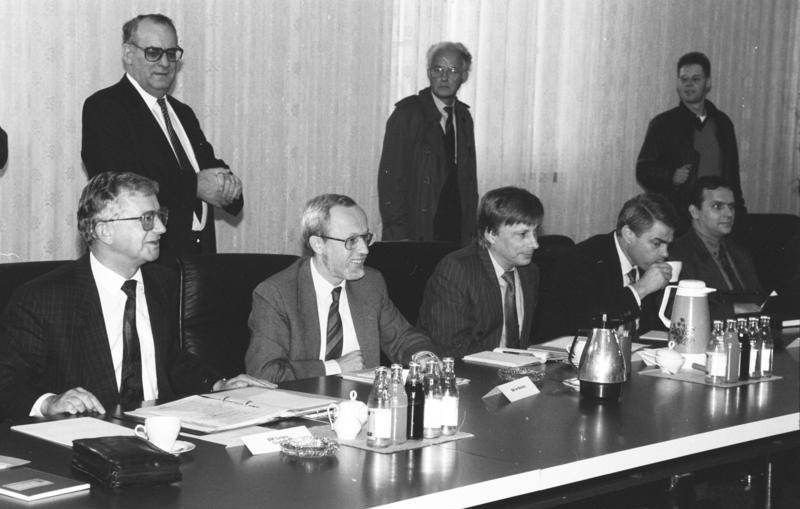
Walther (front row, second one from the right) in October 1990 at a meeting of the other East German political leaders with Head of the Chancellery Rudolf Seiters

Walther was one of 144 Volkskammer co-opted to the Bundestag following German reunification. Walther, alongside other East German political leaders, was appointed Minister for Special Affairs in the Third Kohl cabinet.

In the 1990 German federal election, the DSU under his leadership failed to pass the five-percent threshold. The party received only about 1% in the new states and 0,19 % nationwide. The DSU, already fearing it would miss the five percent threshold nationwide, had originally advocated for the five percent threshold being separate for former East Germany.

A large reason for their crushing defeat was the adamant refusal of the CDU and Helmut Kohl personally of a demand by the CSU, whereby the CDU would stand down in three single-member constituencies, which would have allowed the DSU to bypass the five-percent threshold. Walther had defended this so-called Huckepackverfahren (English: piggybacking), which has had historical precedent, for example in the 1957 West German federal election, from accusations of favoritism in the Volkskammer.

The party also failed to make inroads in the 1990 state elections in former East Germany and after the CSU dropped its immense financial support, the party quickly faded into irrelevancy. Walther himself joined the Christian Democratic Union in 1993, for which he was elected to the Ilm-Kreis district council.
