= Thomas Klein =

German politician (born 1948)

Member of the German Bundestag
- In office October 1990 – December 1990

Member of the Volkskammer
- In office March 1990 – October 1990

Personal details
- Born: April 14, 1948 (age 78) Berlin, Allied-occupied Germany
- Party: The Left; United Left
- Education: Humboldt University of Berlin

Thomas Klein (born April 14, 1948) is a German civil rights activist, historian, and politician.

== Life ==
Klein was born in Berlin on April 14, 1948. He trained as an electrical mechanic before enrolling at Humboldt University to study mathematics, where he received his doctorate in 1976. Meanwhile, Klein had begun working at the Central Institute for Economic Sciences, part of the Academy of Sciences of the GDR, in 1973. During the 1970s, Klein began to associate with opposition groups in the German Democratic Republic. As a result, he was arrested by the Stasi in September 1979, and taken to Berlin-Hohenschönhausen Prison. Klein was convicted of "unlawful contact" ("ungesetzlicher Verbindungsaufnahme") under section 219 of the East German criminal code. During his trial, Gregor Gysi served as his lawyer. He was held in the Bautzen II prison until his release in December 1980. Following his release, Klein was banned from working in the sciences, and was assigned to work at a state-owned furniture company.

In 1987, Klein was a founding member of the opposition Gegenstimmen Group. The group brought together leftist opponents of the ruling Socialist Unity Party, and included Marxists, Titoists, Trotskyites, and members of the Christian left. In a report from 1989, the Stasi counted Klein among the most ardent members of the opposition.

In 1989, Klein was one of the founding members of the United Left, and a co-author of the party's "Böhlener Platform". In the 1990 East German election, he was the United Left's lead candidate, and was the only member of the party elected to the Volkskammer. When Germany reunited, Klein then became a member of the Bundestag until a new federal election was held on December 2, 1990. The United Left began to disintegrate following German reunification, and during the 2000s Klein joined Die Linke.

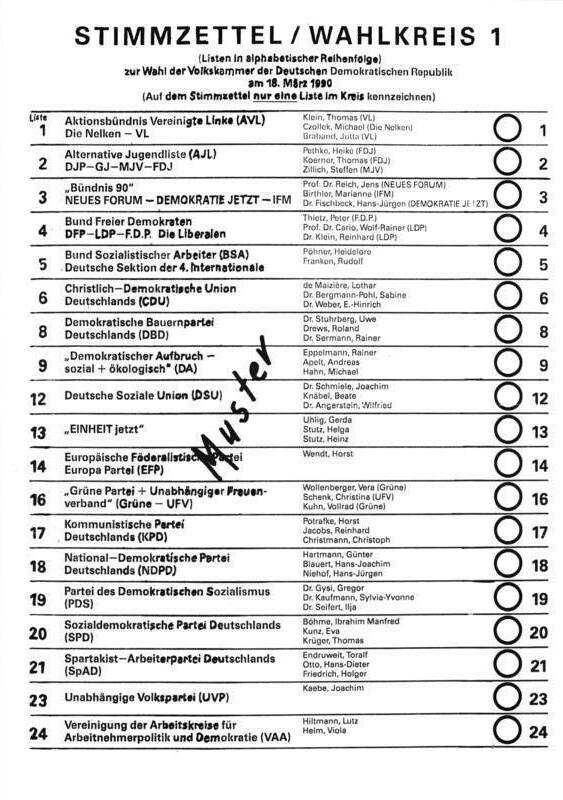
A ballot from the 1990 East German general election showing Thomas Klein as the lead candidate of the United Left (List 1)

Following his time as a member of the Bundestag, Klein then spent two years as an employee of the Bundestag. From 1996 to 2009 he worked at the Centre for Contemporary History in Potsdam as a historian specializing in the history of the German Democratic Republic and its opposition movements. In the course of this work, he has authored five books on East German political history.
