= Jürgen Schmieder =

German politician

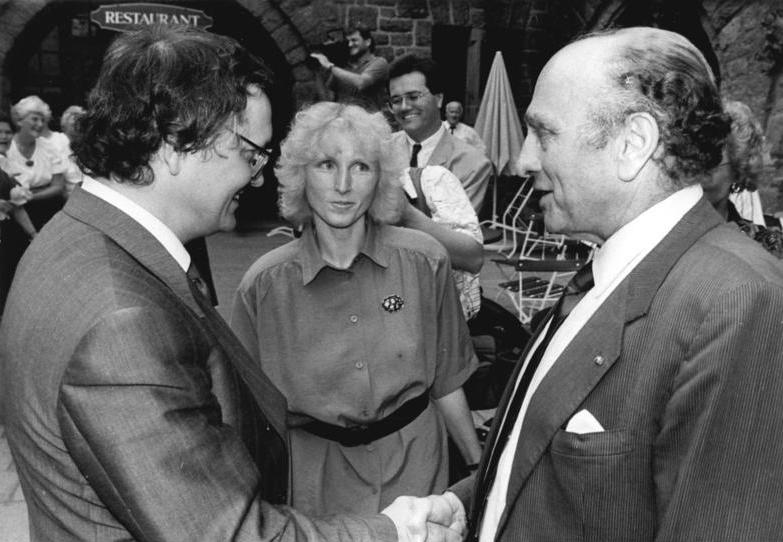
- East meets west: Jürgen Schmieder (left) greets Otto Graf Lambsdorff (right) at an inter-party meeting (1990).
- Born: 23 June 1952 (age 74); Jahnishausen (now part of Riesa), Saxony, East Germany
- Education: Dresden University of Technology
- Occupation: Politician
- Political party: LDPD; DFP; FDP
- Children: Married with 2 children

Jürgen Schmieder (born 23 June 1952) is a politician, originally from East Germany, who came to prominence during the months immediately preceding German reunification.

At the end of January in 1990 he became Chairman (leader) of the short lived German Forum Party (DFP / Deutsche Forumpartei) in East Germany where in 1990 he sat as a member of the country's first (and last) freely elected People's Chamber (Volkskammer).

Following the abolition of East Germany as a separate state, he became a member of the German National Assembly (Bundestag) between 1990 and 1994, his DFP (party) having merged with the German FDP in August 1990.

== Life ==
Schmieder was born during the early years of the German Democratic Republic in a small town roughly halfway between Leipzig and Dresden. His parents were in business. His secondary schooling was successfully concluded in 1971 with several years at a special maths & sciences school in Riesa and an apprenticeship as an electrician.

=== Professional career ===
After his military service, in 1973 he enrolled as a student at the Technological University in Karl-Marx-Stadt. (The town has subsequently reverted to its earlier name, Chemnitz.) In 1978 he graduated with a degree in thermal engineering. He then worked for a year as a project leader with the Leipzig-Grimma Chemical Plant Construction operation before returning to the Technological University, where he was employed, in the first instance, as a research assistant, and then from 1983 till 1984 as a development engineer.

In 1984 he received an engineering doctorate for work on "Vacuum Drying of Plastic Granules in a Rotating-drum Dryer in the presence of Inert Gas". He then became a senior employee with the Karl-Marx-Stadt district council for whom he worked till 1987. After that, till 1990, he was employed as a deputy team leader and patent engineer at the Karl-Marx-Stadt Research Centre. In parallel, in 1989 he started a correspondence course to become a patent attorney.

From 1995 he worked for some time as managing partner of a start-up and management consultancy. At the same time Schmeider has since March 2001 headed up the regional People's Solidarity (Volkssolidarität) organisation in Saxony.

=== Political career ===
Schmieder joined the Liberal Democratic Party of Germany (LDPD / Liberal-Demokratische Partei Deutschlands) in 1982. The East German LDPD was one of five constituent Bloc parties controlled by the country's ruling SED (party) through a political structure called the National Front. Between 1986 and 1988 Schmieder was district deputy party chairman for Karl-Marx-Stadt (Chemnitz) north. Karl-Marx-Stadt was the birthplace of the New Forum movement, and Schmieder was one of a group of New Forum activists who in December 1989 / January 1990 co-founded the German Forum Party (DFP / Deutsche Forumpartei). In January 1990 Schmieder was elected party chairman.

The DFP joined with other small liberal/centrist parties, forming the Association of Free Democrats (Bund Freier Demokraten) to contest the East German national election on 18 March 1990. Schmieder's name headed the Alliance's list for the Leipzig electoral district: he was elected a member of the country's first (and last) freely elected People's Chamber (Volkskammer), and was nominated as one of the assembly's six deputy presidents. In October 1990 Schmieder was not among the 144 deputies in the chamber who, as part of the German reunification process, became members of the Bundestag (National Assembly) of the reunited Germany. However, in the national election two months later his name was included on the FDP candidate list for the Saxony electoral district. The party's share of the vote in Saxony entitled it to five seats from its list for the district, and accordingly Schmieder, whose name was fifth on the party list for the electoral district, was able to take his seat in the Bundestag at the start of 1991.

As a member of the Bundestag he served as a full-time member of the Home affairs committee, the Post and telecommunications committee and more briefly (from August till October 1992) of the Legal affairs committee. He was also an alternating member of the Finance committee. At the same time he became district party Chairman for the FDP in Chemnitz and a member of the party's regional executive for Saxony. He held on to both these regional appointments till 1995.

On the national stage, he failed to be listed as an FDP candidate for the next Bundestag election, which took place on 16 October 1994. He nevertheless contested the election as a direct (i.e. not on a party list) candidate for the Chemnitz electoral district. As anticipated, he failed to get elected, receiving just 2.5% of the first preference votes.
