= Independent Women's Association =

Independent Women's Association Unabhängiger Frauenverband
- Spokesperson: Ina Merkel; Tatjana Böhm
- Founded: 1989
- Dissolved: 1998
- Headquarters: East Berlin, East Germany
- Ideology: Feminism

The Independent Women's Association was a political party that stood for election in the 1990 East German general election in coalition with the East German Green Party. The Independent Women's League placed seventh in the elections. It was the only women-only party to contest the 1990 election.

== Founded in 1989 ==
On 3 December 1989, the participants of a women's congress in the Volksbühne in East Berlin adopted the "Manifesto for an Autonomous Women's Movement". It was decided to form a political association in order to be able to participate in the Round Table, which was to meet for the first time on 7 December 1989. Ina Merkel and Walfriede Schmitt were appointed as representatives of the UFV. The UFV understood itself as an organizational reservoir of the autonomous women's movement of the GDR and thus goes back to older groups in the GDR, such as Women for peace and the beginnings of a women / lesbian movement. They also resigned themselves to the nationwide regime-loyal women's organization, the Democratic Women's Alliance of Germany (DFD).

On 17 February 1990 took place again at a congress in East Berlin the official establishment of the association. This second foundation was necessary to be able to compete in the upcoming elections. The spokespersons of the women's association were Ina Merkel and Tatjana Böhm. The association wanted to unite independent women's groups, women's initiatives, women's commissions and also the women's factions of the parties and mass organizations of the GDR. The UFV understood more as an umbrella organization, the autonomy of the individual women's organizations should be respected. The UFV called for the equal participation of women in all political and economic decisions. The interests of women in the situation of upheaval in the GDR should be taken into account and a worsening of the social situation of women prevented.

== Elections 1990 ==
At the 1990 East German general election on 18 March, the UFV entered into electoral alliance with the newly founded Green Party in the GDR, which holds 2.0% and eight seats won. Part of the joint election program was the drafting of a social charter for the two German states. After the People's Chamber elections, however, the association announced the electoral alliance, because the Green Party received after the election process all eight won mandates and refused, of which the UFV to cede.

For the first All-German 1990 federal election on December 2, the Independent Women's Association went to Democracy Now, the Greens, the Initiative for Peace and Human Rights (IFM), the United Left and the New Forum Party-list proportional representation under the name "Alliance 90 / Green - Citizen Movements" (B90 / Gr).

== Marginalization after reunification ==
The Independent Women's Association helped bring women's issues to the Unification Agenda, such as the more stringent reorganization of § 218, but quickly lost importance after reunification. At the end of September 1991, the 3rd Extraordinary Congress of the UFV in Weimar decided that the association should continue to work as a registered association in the future. This contributed to the political marginalization of the UFV. This club finally dissolved in the summer of 1998. For the most part, the founders went to the East German equality administration and the project scene. Individual local groups using the z. B. in the district of Harz.

== Literature ==
- Anne Hampele Ulrich: Der unabhängige Frauenverband. Ein frauenpolitisches Experiment im deutschen Vereinigungsprozeß. Berliner Debatte Wissenschaftsverlag, 2000, ISBN 3-931703-48-7 (Buchbesprechung)
