= Tatjana Böhm =

German politician

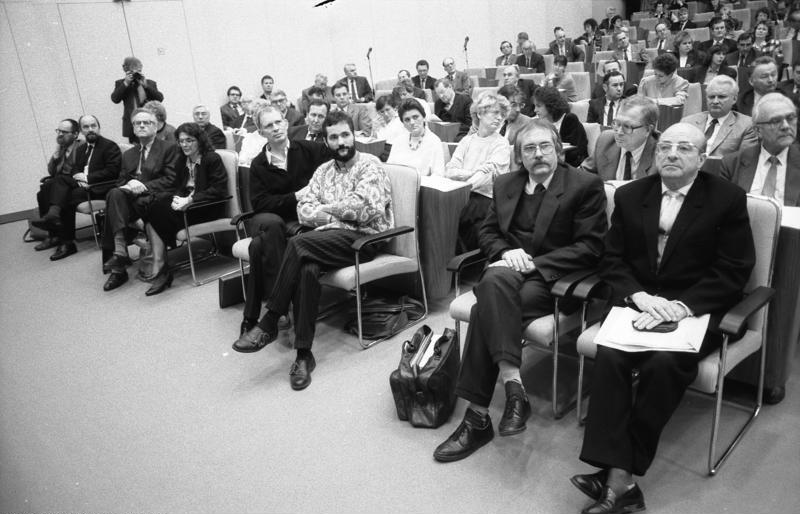
- Tatjana Böhm (fourth from left) as part of the East German Volkskammer in 1990

Personal details
- Born: 2 November 1954 (age 71) Karl-Marx-Stadt, East Germany (now Chemnitz, Germany)
- Party: Unabhängiger Frauenverband

Tatjana Böhm is a former German politician. She was co-founder of Unabhängiger Frauenverband (UFV).
