= 1990 East German general election =

- 18 March 1990
- All 400 seats in the Volkskammer; 201 seats needed for a majority
- Turnout: 93.38%
Party	Leader	Vote %	Seats
CDU	Lothar de Maizière	40.82	163
SPD	Ibrahim Böhme	21.88	88
PDS	Gregor Gysi	16.40	66
DSU	Hans-Wilhelm Ebeling	6.31	25
BFD	Rainer Ortleb; Bruno Menzel; Jürgen Schmieder	5.28	21
B90	Jens Reich	2.91	12
DBD	Günther Maleuda	2.18	9
Green–UFV	Carlo Jordan	1.97	8
DA	Wolfgang Schnur	0.92	4
NDPD	Wolfgang Rauls	0.38	2
DFD	Eva Rohmann	0.33	1
United Left	Thomas Klein	0.18	1
This lists parties that won seats. See the complete results below.

Government before	Government after election
Modrow cabinet National unity government	de Maizière cabinet Alliance for Germany–SPD–BFD

General elections were held in East Germany on 18 March 1990. These were the first free elections held in the region since the turbulent Weimar days of 1932 and would become the only truly democratic vote in the German Democratic Republic (GDR). The election stood as a final verdict on four decades of one-party rule by the Socialist Unity Party of Germany (SED)–led National Front. It took place against the backdrop of the German reunification process, which had already begun to gather momentum.

The contest was swept by the Alliance for Germany, a coalition led by the newly reconstituted East German Christian Democratic Union (CDU), which captured 192 of the 400 seats in the Volkskammer and had run on a promise of swift reunification with West Germany. The Social Democratic Party (SPD), re-established only months earlier after its forced 1946 merger with the Communist Party of Germany (KPD), was widely tipped to win but instead came second with 88 seats. In third was the former ruling SED, now rebranded as the Party of Democratic Socialism (PDS), which secured 66 seats. The Alliance fell just short of an outright majority having needed 201 seats to govern alone.

Lothar de Maizière, the CDU's leader, invited the SPD to join a broad coalition alongside the German Social Union (DSU) and Democratic Awakening (DA). The SPD hesitated, wary of the DSU's right-wing populist tone, having earlier vowed to collaborate with all but the PDS and DSU. However, a grand coalition was ultimately formed. This government, commanding a two-thirds supermajority in the Volkskammer, set about the task of dismantling the East German state and laying the legal groundwork for reunification, although the coalition would collapse later that August. On 3 October 1990, the GDR ceased to exist and all its territories joined the Federal Republic of Germany (FRG). 144 Volkskammer members were integrated into the West German Bundestag, serving until the all-German federal election on 2 December that year.

== Background ==
The Peaceful Revolution of 1989 resulted in the Socialist Unity Party of Germany giving up its monopoly on power, and permitting opposition parties to operate for the first time. They began to form in large numbers throughout November and December 1989. Opposition groups formed the East German Round Table, which was joined by representatives of the SED to negotiate reforms; at its first meeting on 7 December 1989, the Round Table agreed that elections to the Volkskammer would be held on 6 May 1990.

== Electoral system ==
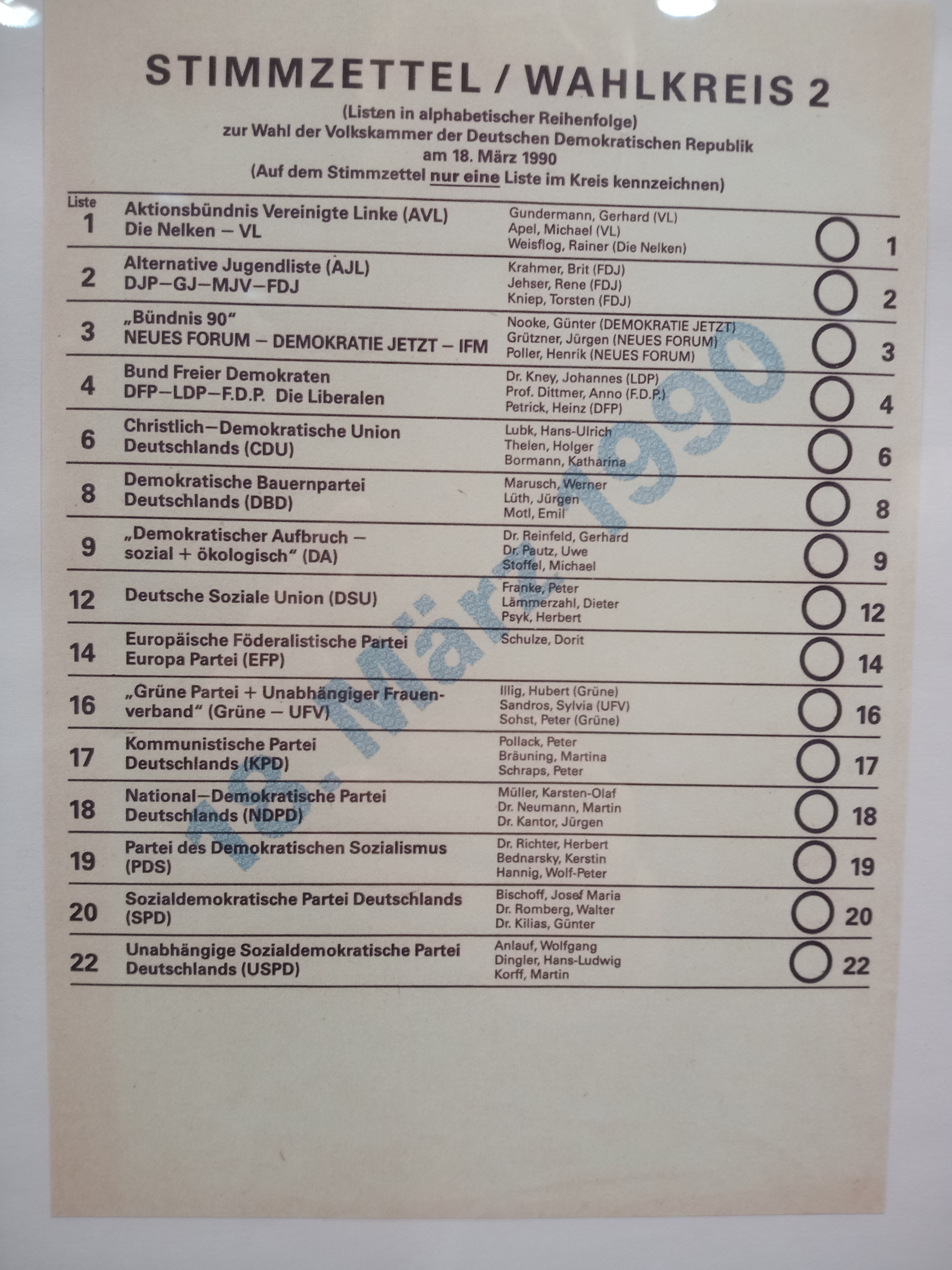
Ballot paper

On 20 February 1990 the Volkskammer passed a new electoral law, reducing it in size to 400 members elected via party-list proportional representation, with no electoral threshold. Joint lists between parties were allowed, and a number of parties formed alliances for the election, including the Association of Free Democrats, Alliance 90, and an alliance between the Green Party and Independent Women's Association. Seats were calculated nationally using the largest remainder method, and distributed in multi-member constituencies corresponding to the fifteen Bezirke.

== Campaign ==
The campaign for was unusually short, lasting only seven weeks after the vote was brought forward from May to 18 March following negotiations between the Round Table and the government of Hans Modrow on 28 January. This tight schedule posed significant organizational challenges. Only the PDS, as the successor to the SED, possessed the necessary infrastructure and financial resources for a full campaign. In contrast, newly formed opposition parties and civil rights groups were still defining their platforms and had minimal experience in electioneering. Their shortcomings were partially mitigated by substantial support from West German parties, which provided logistical and strategic assistance to their Eastern counterparts.

Western support facilitated the creation of several electoral alliances. The CDU partnered with the German Social Union and Democratic Awakening to form the Alliance for Germany. The FDP backed the Association of Free Democrats, which included the Liberal Democratic Party of Germany (LDPD) and the minor FDP of the GDR. These alliances were established only weeks before the election, relying heavily on Western assistance such as the CDU's "district partnerships" and the participation of West German campaigners. At the outset, the SPD appeared likely to win, benefiting from historical roots in the region and strong backing from the West German SPD. Early polls showed it leading with 54 percent support, ahead of the PDS and CDU.

Despite early advantages, the SPD's momentum declined as reunification became the dominant issue. West German SPD leader Oskar Lafontaine was cautious about unification and criticized possible NATO membership for a united Germany, which may have weakened the party's appeal. Meanwhile, Helmut Kohl and the Western CDU made unification the central theme of their campaign, drawing large crowds to rallies in cities such as Erfurt and Chemnitz. The Alliance for Germany organised over 1,400 campaign events and mobilised high-profile Western politicians. In a final blow to the opposition, Democratic Awakening's lead candidate Wolfgang Schnur was exposed by Der Spiegel as a Stasi informant just days before the vote, damaging the credibility of one of the key parties in the alliance.

=== Party programs ===
==== Alliance for Germany ====
The Alliance for Germany presented its election manifesto under the slogan "Never again socialism" („Nie wieder Sozialismus“). Its main objectives included achieving German reunification based on the Basic Law for the Federal Republic of Germany as a unified constitution, guaranteeing rights to private property and unrestricted freedom of trade, and removing all barriers to Western investment. The alliance called for the immediate introduction of the Deutsche Mark at a 1:1 exchange rate to the East German mark. Social policy commitments included establishing a social security network, environmental protection measures, securing energy supplies, and harmonising laws with the West, notably abolishing criminal offences linked to political activities. Other priorities were monument preservation, education reform, maintaining day nurseries, restoring the federal states (Länder), and ensuring press freedom.

==== Social Democratic Party of Germany ====
At the first party conference of the re-established SPD, held in Leipzig from 22 to 25 February 1990, the party adopted its basic programme and election manifesto centred on the promotion of an ecologically oriented social market economy.

==== Party of Democratic Socialism ====
The PDS campaign was titled "Democratic Freedom for All – Social Security for Everyone". It characterised itself as a democratic socialist party advocating a socially and ecologically oriented market economy that ensured social security based on merit. The PDS emphasised preserving the GDR's social achievements under the SED, including the right to work, childcare systems, cooperative and public ownership in the economy, and values of anti-fascism and internationalism. The programme demanded disarmament of both East and West and supported maintaining the status of former SED members and land reforms. Rejecting immediate unification, the PDS proposed a confederal structure between East and West Germany, preserving their separate statehood while gradually moving towards a neutral and demilitarised German confederation.

== Interference by West Germany ==
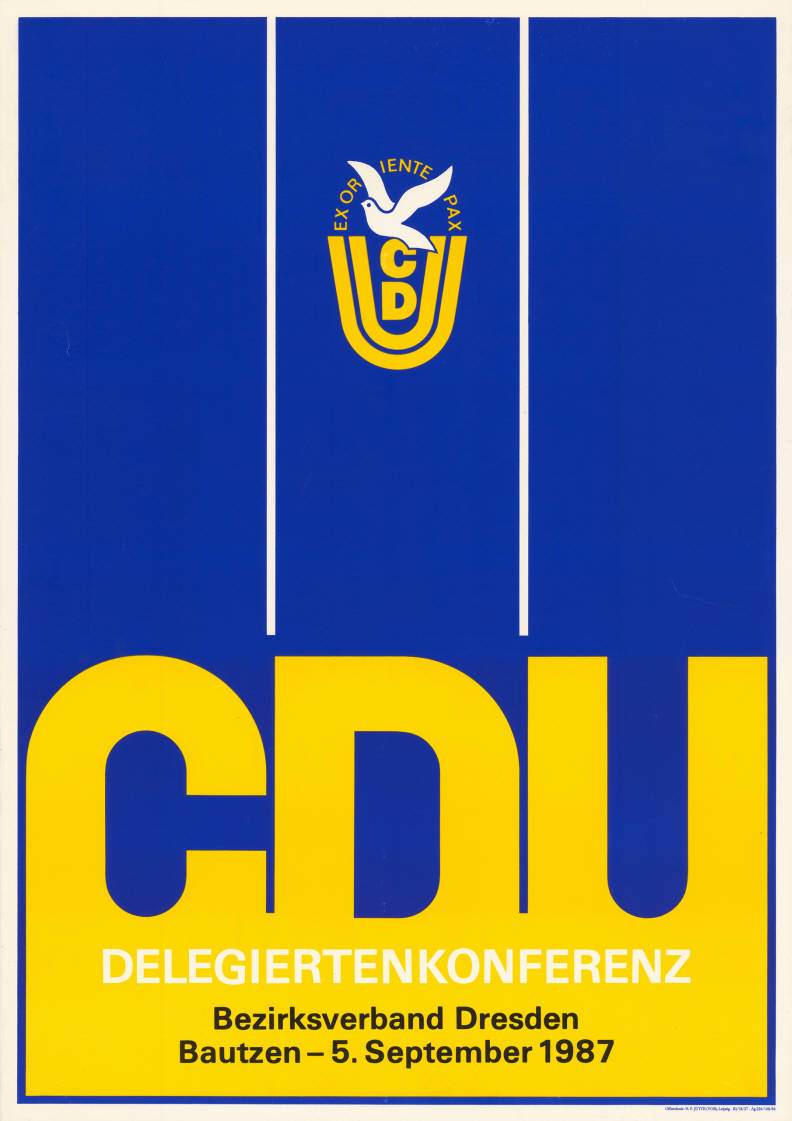
The posters used by the Christian Democratic Union (CDU) in the 1990 election (left) resembled those of its western counterpart (center) rather than its own distinct pre-1990 posters (right)

The elections, while a landmark of democratic transformation, were also shaped significantly by external influences particularly from West Germany. Writer Michael Schneider was among those who criticised what he viewed as overwhelming interference by West German politicians and institutions. In his work, he described the campaign environment as one saturated with West German personalities, party activists and messaging. West German political parties, especially its branches of the Christian Democratic Union (CDU) and Social Democratic Party (SPD), sent campaigners and resources across the border to bolster their East German affiliates. According to Schneider, taxpayer funds from West Germany were used to support this mobilisation, raising questions about the balance of influence and the fairness of the electoral playing field.

Civil rights activist and co-founder of the New Forum, Jens Reich, echoed these concerns from the perspective of the East German opposition. Speaking two decades after the vote, he reflected that the entire West German political apparatus had been transplanted into the East, overwhelming grassroots democratic movements that had played a key role in the Peaceful Revolution. In his words, "The Bonn hippopotamus came in such a mass that you were simply helpless." Reich observed that the election campaign bore little resemblance to a homegrown democratic process and instead felt like a western-style election exported wholesale into a fragile new democracy. This imbalance, he argued, made it difficult for indigenous East German parties and civic movements to compete on equal terms.

This large-scale West German involvement was not limited to campaign workers and funding. West German media, political advertisements and party materials flooded East German spaces in the run-up to the election, promoting a vision of rapid reunification under Western terms. While many East Germans were eager for economic stability and political freedom, critics argue that this form of campaigning blurred the lines between support and manipulation. The West German framing of the vote as a de facto referendum on reunification placed enormous pressure on the East German electorate and marginalised alternative visions for East Germany's future. Although the election was formally free, the conditions surrounding it raise ongoing debate over whether it represented a fully sovereign exercise in democracy or a lopsided contest shaped by the overwhelming influence of West Germany.

== Opinion polls ==
In 2005 Forschungsgruppe Wahlen researcher Matthias Jung, who was involved in organising opinion polling for the election, spoke of the difficulties of the task. He attributed this to the unpredictable behaviour of the electorate as well as the total lack of infrastructure and methods for gauging public opinion, which forced the institute to build an entirely new polling model. Despite beginning work at the end of 1989, FW only released one poll before the election, which Jung claimed accurately predicted the CDU victory. This may refer to a FW poll showing that 35% of voters believed an Alliance for Germany-led government would be most capable of solving the country's problems, while only 27% believed an SPD-led government would; 29% believed a grand coalition would be most capable. This starkly contrasted with other polls, conducted without reliable methods, which predicted a landslide SPD victory.

Firm	Date	Sample	Abs.	CDU	DSU	DA	SPD	PDS	LDPD	FDP	NDPD	B90	Grüne	DBD	VL	Und.	Lead
Election result	18 March 1990	N/A	6.6	40.8	6.3	0.9	21.9	16.4	5.3		0.4	2.9	2.0	2.2	0.2	–	18.9
Infratest	12 March 1990	Unknown	–	20	5	1	44	10	2	2	–	1	1	3	–	–	24
Central Institute for Youth Research Leipzig	8 March 1990	~1200	16	21	7	2	34	17	4	2	1	2 (Note: New Forum 1%, Democracy Now 1%.)	3	3	–	–	13
Society for Social Research and Statistical Analysis	2 March 1990	984	9	24			53	11	3			–	3	3	–	–	29
Central Institute for Youth Research Leipzig	6 February 1990	1,000	–	11	–	–	54	12	4	–	–	3 (Note: New Forum 3%.)	–	–	–	–	44
Academy of Social Sciences	30–31 December 1989	Unknown	7.3	7.9	–	2.0	5.4	34	2.6	–	2.0	5.8 (Note: New Forum 5.8%.)	1.0	1.6	0.7	28.2	26.1
Stern	17–19 November 1989	Unknown	–	12	–	–	10	14	15			22 (Note: New Forum 22%.)		–	–	24	7

== Results ==
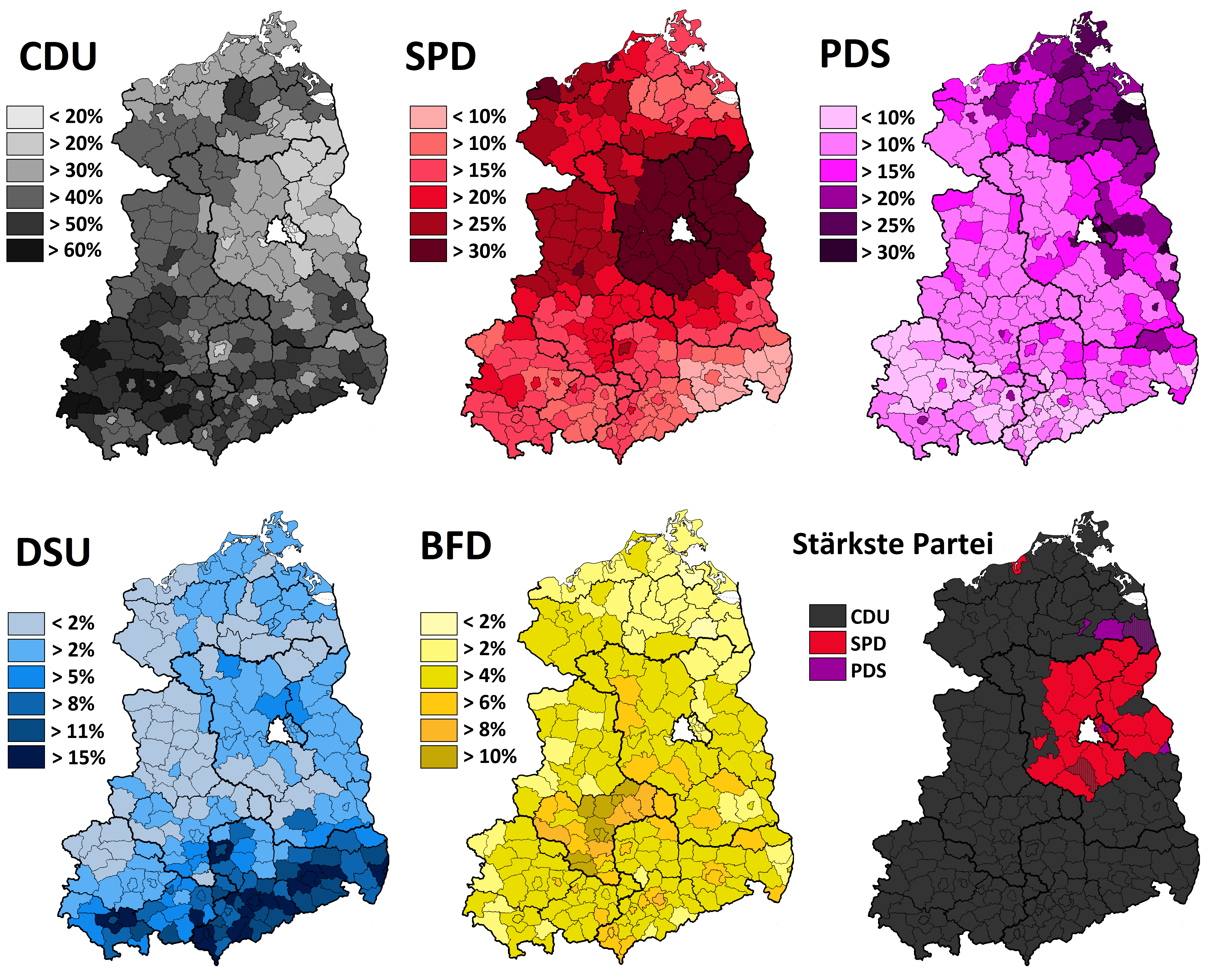
Maps showing the distribution of party votes per circle. The map in the bottom right shows the largest party in each district (several circles make a district).

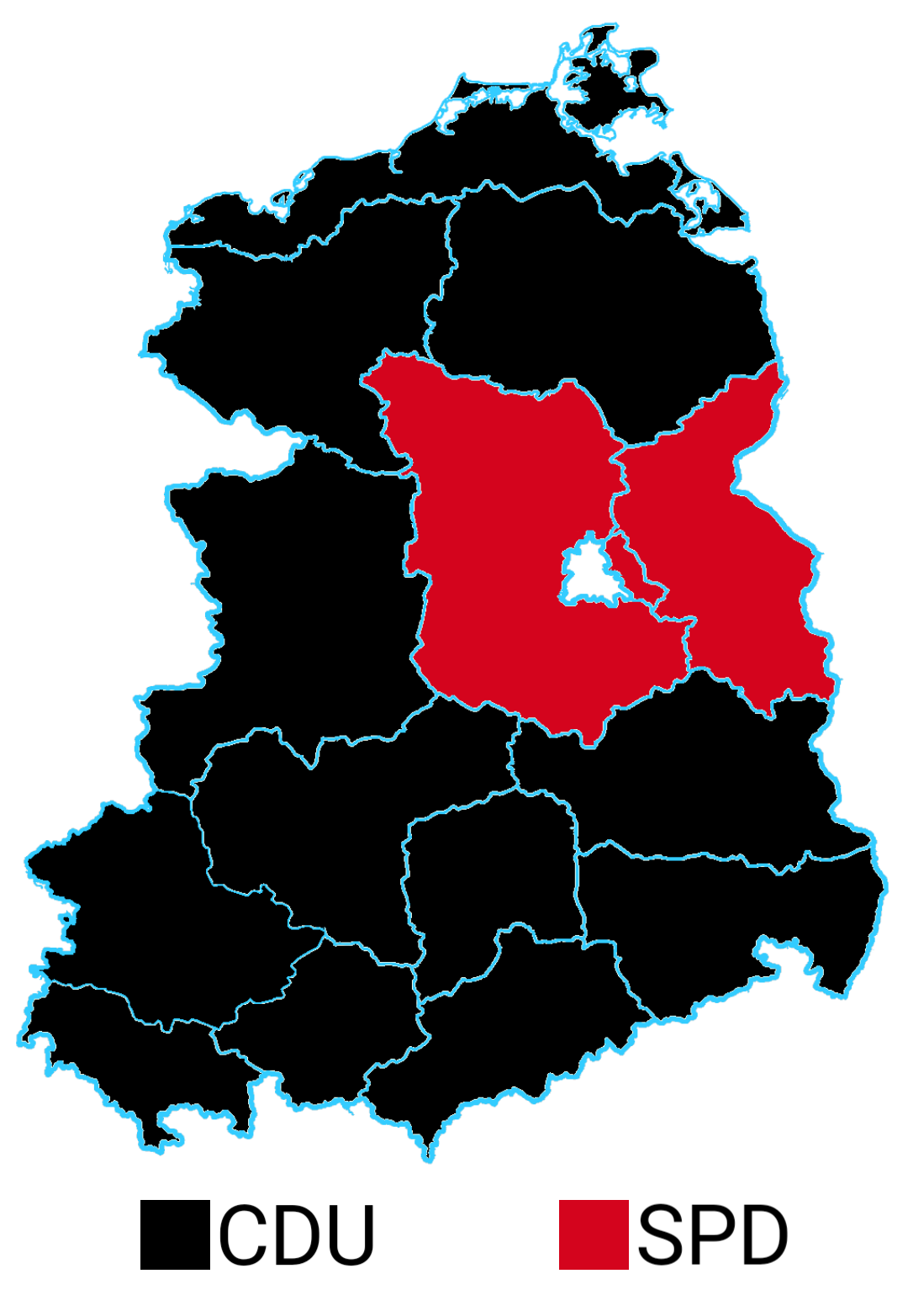
Strongest party in the districts

Party or alliance		Votes	%	Seats	+/–
Alliance for Germany	Christian Democratic Union	4,710,598	40.82	163	+111
Alliance for Germany	German Social Union	727,730	6.31	25	New
Alliance for Germany	Democratic Awakening	106,146	0.92	4	New
Alliance for Germany	Total	5,544,474	48.04	192	+140
Social Democratic Party		2,525,534	21.88	88	New
Party of Democratic Socialism		1,892,381	16.40	66	–61
Association of Free Democrats		608,935	5.28	21	–31
Alliance 90		336,074	2.91	12	New
Democratic Farmers' Party		251,226	2.18	9	–43
Green Party–Independent Women's Association		226,932	1.97	8	New
National Democratic Party		44,292	0.38	2	–50
Democratic Women's League		38,192	0.33	1	–31
United Left		20,342	0.18	1	New
Alternative Youth List (DJP–GJ–MJV–FDJ)		14,616	0.13	0	–37
Christian League		10,691	0.09	0	New
Communist Party		8,819	0.08	0	New
Independent Social Democratic Party		3,891	0.03	0	New
European Federalist Party		3,636	0.03	0	New
Independent People's Party		3,007	0.03	0	New
German Beer Drinkers' Union		2,534	0.02	0	New
Spartacist Workers Party		2,417	0.02	0	New
Unity Now		2,396	0.02	0	New
Federation of Socialist Workers		386	0.00	0	New
Association of Working Groups for Work Policy and Democracy		380	0.00	0	New
Total		11,541,155	100.00	400	0
Valid votes		11,541,155	99.45		
Invalid/blank votes		63,263	0.55		
Total votes		11,604,418	100.00		
Registered voters/turnout		12,426,443	93.38		
Source: Nohlen & Stöver, IPU, Wahlen in Deutschland

=== Votes by Bezirk ===
Bezirk	CDU		SPD		PDS		DSU		BFD		B90		DBD		G–UFV		DA		NDPD		DFD		VL		Others	
Rostock	211,774	34.3	153,137	24.8	142,929	23.2	17,238	2.8	20,843	3.4	16,478	2.7	27,288	4.4	11,769	1.9	4,049	0.7	2,443	0.4	3,159	0.5	1,079	0.2	4,845	0.8
Schwerin	161,712	39.8	103,103	25.4	72,464	17.8	7,979	2.0	18,489	4.5	10,337	2.5	16,408	4.0	9,605	2.4	2,354	0.6	2,176	0.5	–	–	627	0.2	1,252	0.4
Neubrandenburg	151,562	36.0	89,146	21.2	108,589	25.8	8,618	2.0	12,757	3.0	6,700	1.6	26,304	6.3	7,587	1.8	2,172	0.5	2,759	0.7	2,404	0.6	693	0.2	1,378	0.3
Potsdam	244,569	31.2	269,041	34.4	129,627	16.6	23,022	2.9	38,508	4.9	29,919	3.8	17,530	2.2	16,822	2.1	5,903	0.8	2,759	0.4	–	–	1,657	0.2	3,665	0.4
Frankfurt (Oder)	134,222	27.8	153,904	31.9	106,412	22.1	16,920	3.5	20,413	4.2	15,200	3.2	13,954	2.9	10,761	2.2	3,476	0.7	2,060	0.4	2,393	0.5	937	0.2	1,871	0.4
Magdeburg	386,694	44.2	240,205	27.5	124,391	14.2	17,058	2.0	38,578	4.4	17,011	1.9	15,616	1.8	17,427	2.0	5,926	0.7	3,382	0.4	4,246	0.5	1,168	0.1	2,854	0.3
Cottbus	255,435	42.8	115,001	19.3	106,733	17.9	28,476	4.8	31,258	5.2	15,976	2.7	20,285	3.4	11,841	2.0	4,723	0.8	3,983	0.7	–	–	1,106	0.2	2,551	0.4
Halle	557,694	45.1	257,430	20.8	170,808	13.8	34,026	2.8	123,336	10.0	29,529	2.4	21,793	1.8	19,868	1.6	7,155	0.6	3,999	0.3	5,297	0.4	2,257	0.2	3,242	0.2
Leipzig	371,346	39.6	201,703	21.5	135,718	14.5	94,520	10.1	50,462	5.4	31,230	3.3	15,431	1.6	17,381	1.9	6,482	0.7	3,044	0.3	3,867	0.4	1,296	0.1	4,235	0.4
Erfurt	485,297	56.3	161,558	18.7	85,764	9.9	21,212	2.5	39,166	4.5	15,661	1.8	12,005	1.4	17,694	2.1	16,457	1.9	2,395	0.3	2,690	0.3	1,289	0.1	1,502	0.2
Dresden	538,240	45.0	115,893	9.7	176,629	14.8	165,280	13.8	66,392	5.5	43,702	3.7	33,770	2.8	21,475	1.8	12,897	1.1	6,429	0.5	5,267	0.4	1,638	0.1	9,282	0.8
Karl-Marx-Stadt	594,166	45.0	206,673	15.6	149,176	11.3	195,427	14.8	79,078	6.0	27,352	2.1	14,084	1.1	21,319	1.6	12,966	1.0	3,847	0.3	5,233	0.4	2,323	0.2	10,086	0.7
Gera	253,524	48.9	85,523	16.5	65,072	12.5	42,574	8.2	26,471	5.1	13,393	2.6	7,023	1.4	10,626	2.0	8,709	1.7	1,917	0.4	1,908	0.4	831	0.2	1,093	0.2
Suhl	202,403	50.6	64,384	16.1	50,235	12.6	35,647	8.9	16,593	4.1	7,508	1.9	5,670	1.4	9,192	2.3	3,845	1.0	1,541	0.4	1,728	0.4	578	0.1	847	0.3
East Berlin	161,960	18.3	308,833	34.8	267,834	30.2	19,733	2.2	26,591	3.0	56,078	6.3	4,065	0.5	23,565	2.7	9,032	1.0	1,558	0.2	–	–	2,863	0.3	4,070	0.4

=== Seats by Bezirk ===
Bezirk	Total seats	Seats won											
Bezirk	Total seats	CDU	SPD	PDS	DSU	BFD	B90	DBD	G–UFV	DA	NDPD	DFD	VL
Rostock	21	7	5	5	1	1	1	1					
Schwerin	15	6	4	3		1		1					
Neubrandenburg	13	5	3	4				1					
Potsdam	27	8	10	4	1	1	1	1	1				
Frankfurt (Oder)	15	5	5	4		1							
Magdeburg	30	13	8	4	1	1	1	1	1				
Cottbus	21	9	4	4	1	1	1	1					
Halle	44	19	9	6	1	4	1	1	1		1	1	
Leipzig	33	13	7	5	3	2	1	1	1				
Erfurt	31	17	6	3	1	1	1			1			
Dresden	43	19	4	6	6	2	2	1	1	1	1		
Karl-Marx-Stadt	45	20	7	5	7	3	1		1	1			
Gera	16	9	3	2	1	1							
Suhl	13	7	2	2	1	1							
East Berlin	33	6	11	9	1	1	2		1	1			1
Total	400	163	88	66	25	21	12	9	8	4	2	1	1

=== Votes by state ===
Co-optation of Volkskammer members into the Bundestag
- 3 October 1990
- All 663 seats in the Bundestag; 332 seats needed for a majority
Party	Leader	Seats	+/–
CDU	Helmut Kohl	248	+63
CSU	Theodor Waigel	49	0
SPD	Hans-Jochen Vogel	226	+40
FDP	Otto Graf Lambsdorff	57	+11
Greens	Petra Kelly	51	+9
PDS	Gregor Gysi	23	New
DSU	Hansjoachim Walther	8	New
United Left	Thomas Klein	1	New
This lists parties that won seats. See the complete results below.
Government before	Government after election
Third Kohl cabinet CDU/CSU–FDP	Third Kohl cabinet CDU/CSU/DSU–FDP

In order to determine the composition of the East German representatives in the Bundestag between German reunification and the first post-reunification elections in December 1990, the results of the 1990 Volkskammer election were recounted, using the new states of Germany as constituencies. This was possible since the original election results were declared on the Kreis level, and the states were re-established by simply amalgamating Kreise together. The results in each Kreis forming a state were summed up to determine the statewide result. The recount fixed the number of Volkskammer members from each party who would be co-opted into the Bundestag.

State	CDU		SPD		PDS		DSU		BFD		B90		DBD		G–UFV		DA		NDPD		DFD		VL		Others	
Brandenburg	615,975	33.6	548,912	29.9	335,822	18.3	61,001	3.3	86,188	4.7	59,945	3.3	51,678	2.8	39,359	2.1	13,869	0.8	8,392	0.5	2,763	0.2	3,637	0.2	7,763	0.4
East Berlin	161,960	18.3	308,833	34.8	267,834	30.2	19,733	2.2	26,591	3.0	56,078	6.3	4,065	0.5	23,565	2.7	9,032	1.0	1,558	0.2	–	–	2,863	0.3	4,070	0.4
Mecklenburg-Vorpommern	486,038	36.3	313,020	23.4	305,123	22.8	31,947	2.4	47,981	3.6	31,678	2.4	65,422	4.9	26,785	2.0	8,152	0.6	6,849	0.5	5,193	0.4	2,218	0.2	7,161	0.5
Saxony	1,506,832	43.4	522,580	15.1	472,037	13.6	454,298	13.1	197,644	5.7	102,987	3.0	65,274	1.9	60,667	1.7	32,282	0.9	13,711	0.4	13,955	0.4	5,348	0.2	23,739	0.7
Saxony-Anhalt	933,276	44.5	496,606	23.7	293,605	14.0	50,393	2.4	161,580	7.7	46,255	2.2	37,696	1.8	36,978	1.8	12,650	0.6	7,351	0.4	9,402	0.4	3,410	0.2	6,053	0.3
Thuringia	1,006,517	52.5	335,583	17.5	217,960	11.4	110,358	5.8	88,951	4.6	39,131	2.0	27,091	1.4	39,578	2.1	30,161	1.6	6,431	0.3	6,879	0.4	2,866	0.1	3,987	0.2

== Aftermath ==
The newly elected Volkskammer was constituted on 5 April 1990, and elected Sabine Bergmann-Pohl of the CDU as its president. As the State Council of the GDR was dissolved at the same time, she became East Germany's interim head of state. Four days later, after protracted negotiations, Lothar de Maizière announced the formation of a grand coalition between the Alliance for Germany, SPD, and BFD. On 12 April 1990, he was elected Prime Minister of the GDR by the Volkskammer with 265 votes in favour, 108 against, and 9 abstentions. The new cabinet was also confirmed. The partners in the coalition commanded a two-thirds supermajority in the Volkskammer, making it an übergroß coalition with enough seats to pass amendments to the constitution.

The new parliament quickly passed several pieces of major legislation, including a new law regarding local government on 17 May, a law ratifying the monetary, economic, and social union with the Federal Republic of Germany on 18 May (which became effective on 1 July), and constitutional amendments on 17 June. On 21 June, the Volkskammer formed a special committee, chaired by Joachim Gauck, to control the dissolution of the Ministry for State Security (Stasi).

On 20 September 1990, the Volkskammer voted 299–80 to accept the Treaty on the Final Settlement with Respect to Germany, which had earlier been approved in a 442–47 vote by the West German Bundestag. The treaty stipulated that East Germany would unify its territory with Federal Republic of Germany via Article 23 of the Basic Law, meaning that East Germany and the Volkskammer would cease to exist. The chamber's last legislative period therefore only lasted four and a half months. The treaty took effect on 3 October 1990; on the same day, 144 of the 400 Volkskammer deputies became members of the Bundestag (63 from the CDU, 33 from the SPD, 24 from the PDS, 9 from the BFD, 8 from the DSU, and 7 from Alliance 90 and the Green Party). The 8 DSU members joined the CDU/CSU Bundestag Group, briefly renamed CDU/CSU/DSU. The distribution of seats between these parties was determined by recalculating the results of the 1990 elections on a per-state basis. Their tenure came to an end two months later with the first all-German federal election on 2 December 1990.
