= Thomas Welz =

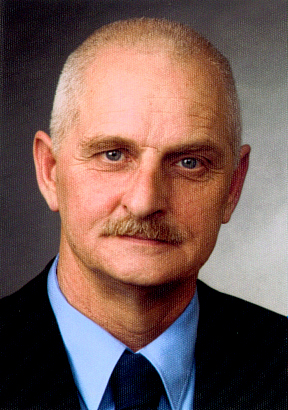
Thomas Welz, 2012

Thomas Welz (born 1957 as Thomas Berndt in Bad Berka) grew up in the suburbs of Berlin. As head of the information department, he was editor and author of several illegal samizdat publications with Rainer Eppelmann of the peace circle of the East Berlin Samariterkirche (Church of the Good Samaritan) in Berlin-Friedrichshain. Many of them became the mouthpiece of the East German civil rights movement, including publications like "Shalom", "Wegzehrung" and "Wendezeit", one of the first publications, in where term "Wende" was used. During his military service in the NVA, Thomas Welz was detained for five months from October 1978 in the infamous military prison in Schwedt.

Welz, active in various initiatives and ad hoc groups of the East German opposition and the peace movement was co-founder of the oppositional political group Democratic Awakening in 1989. After German reunification in 1990, he was active in the Social Democratic Party of Germany. He is married and has two sons. He lives in Berlin.

== References and media ==
- Ehrhart Neubert: Geschichte der Opposition in der DDR 1949–1989. Bundeszentrale für politische Bildung, Schriftenreihe Band 346, Bonn 1997, ISBN 3-89331-294-3.
- Ehrhart Neubert: Unsere Revolution. Die Geschichte der Jahre 1989/90. Piper-Verlag, München–Zürich 2008, ISBN 978-3-492-05155-2.
- Rainer Eppelmann: Fremd im eigenen Haus. Mein Leben im anderen Deutschland. Kiepenheuer & Witsch, Köln 2003, ISBN 3-462-02279-2.
- RBB-Magazin Stilbruch: Ab nach Schwedt! Die Geschichte des DDR-Militärstrafvollzugs (German)
- MDR-Magazin Barbarossa: Der Mythos Schwedt - über das Militärgefängnis der NVA (German)
