= German Forum Party =

German Forum Party Deutsche Forumpartei
- Leader: Jürgen Schmieder
- Founded: 27 January 1990
- Dissolved: 11 August 1990
- Merged into: Free Democratic Party
- Headquarters: Karl-Marx-Stadt, East Germany
- Ideology: Liberalism
- Political position: Centre
- National affiliation: Association of Free Democrats

The German Forum Party (German: Deutsche Forumpartei) was an opposition political party in East Germany. It was formed from the New Forum (Neues Forum) citizens' movement. It was founded in Karl-Marx-Stadt (now Chemnitz) on 27 January 1990. Its first chairman was Jürgen Schmieder. It described itself as being at the political centre.

It was invited to join the Christian Democrat-dominated Alliance for Germany coalition for the 1990 Volkskammer election but instead it joined the Association of Free Democrats on 12 February 1990.

== See also ==
- Liberalism
- Contributions to liberal theory
- Liberalism worldwide
- List of liberal parties
- Liberal democracy
- Liberalism in Germany
