= Association of Free Democrats =

Liberal political alliance

Association of Free Democrats Bund Freier Demokraten
- Leader: Jürgen Schmieder
- Parliamentary leader: Rainer Ortleb (The Liberal group)
- Founded: 12 February 1990 (as electoral coalition); 27 March 1990 (as party)
- Dissolved: 27 March 1990 (as electoral coalition); 12 August 1990 (as party)
- Merged into: Free Democratic Party
- Ideology: Liberalism
- Political position: Centre to centre-right
- Member parties: Liberal Democratic Party; Free Democratic Party (East Germany); German Forum Party; National-Democratic Party (after 27 March 1990)
- Slogan: "Freedom needs Work." (German: "Freiheit braucht Leistung.") "You've had the left. You don't want the right. Vote for the strong center." (German: "Links hatten Sie. Rechts wollen Sie nicht. Wählen Sie die starke Mitte.")

The Association of Free Democrats (German: Bund Freier Demokraten) was a liberal electoral coalition, later party, formed in East Germany on 12 February 1990. It originally consisted of the Liberal Democratic Party, the Free Democratic Party (East Germany) and the German Forum Party. In the Volkskammer election of the 18 March 1990 the Association of Free Democrats, heavily supported by the West German Free Democratic Party, polled 5.28% of the votes and gained 21 seats, all parties running on the same lists. Most of the seats went to Liberal Democratic Party members, whose leader Rainer Ortleb became their parliamentary leader. It then participated in the last GDR government led by Lothar de Maizière.

On 27 March 1990, the Liberal Democratic Party and the National Democratic Party of Germany, previously excluded from the coalition, merged into the party Association of Free Democrats, leaving their old identity as bloc parties behind. Ortleb was elected chairman, former NDPD leader Wolfgang Rauls became his deputy. Finally, on 11 August 1990 the Association of Free Democrats party, the Free Democratic Party (East Germany) and the German Forum Party merged with the Free Democratic Party.

== See also ==
- Liberalism
- Contributions to liberal theory
- Liberalism worldwide
- List of liberal parties
- Liberal democracy
- Liberalism in Germany
