= German Social Union (East Germany) =

German Social Union Deutsche Soziale Union
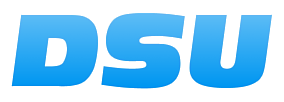
- Leader: Roberto Rink
- Founded: 20 January 1990
- Headquarters: Dorfstraße 43; 08233 Treuen
- Ideology: National conservatism; Christian democracy; Social conservatism; Right-wing populism; Anti-communism
- Political position: Right-wing; Before Re-Unification: Centre-right to right-wing
- Colours: Blue and green
- Bundestag: 0 / 630

Website
- www.dsu-deutschland.de

The German Social Union (German: Deutsche Soziale Union, DSU) is a small conservative political party mainly active in the new states of Germany. It was founded in 1990 as a right-wing opposition group during the Wende transition to democracy in East Germany, when it was part of the Alliance for Germany electoral coalition. After 1990, it fell into insignificance, only holding a few seats on the local level.

== Ideology ==
According to its 2006 basic programme, the DSU refers to itself as a conservative, democratic and social party. Ideologically, the party's goals are to preserve and uphold Western-Christian civilization, and to dismantle the welfare state.

The party can thus be seen as right-wing (anti-socialistic) national-conservative. It strongly differentiates itself from the National Democratic Party (NPD) and German People's Union (DVU), who tend more towards national socialism. Its closest ideological ally among the right-wing parties is The Republicans. Historically, and as its name implies, it is modelled after the CSU in Bavaria, the more rightist of the two Union "sister parties". However, it was not possible for the DSU to join the CSU, as the CDU and CSU do not compete in the same states.

== History ==
=== Establishment ===
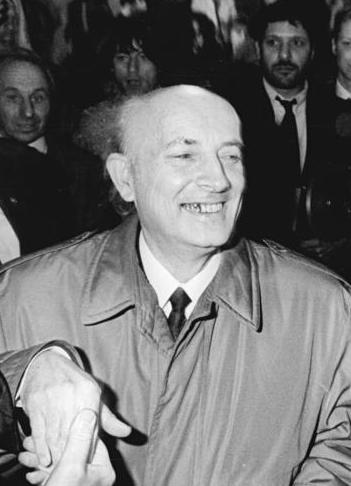
Hans-Wilhelm Ebeling, first chairman (early 1990)

In the chaotic world of 1989–1990 East German politics, several long-suppressed cultural and political movements (re)emerged, and numerous small parties sprang up. The German Social Union was one of these, then several comprising conservative, Christian-democratic and liberal opposition groups.

The party was founded in Leipzig on 20 January 1990 by the St. Thomas Church pastor Hans-Wilhelm Ebeling, modeled loosely on the Christian Social Union of Bavaria (Christlich-Soziale Union, CSU). Initially, the Bavarian CSU supported the DSU to the tune of millions, wishing to make it its East German branch, and thus revisiting Franz Josef Strauß' mid-1970s plan to make the CSU a nationwide "fourth party".

=== Reunification period ===
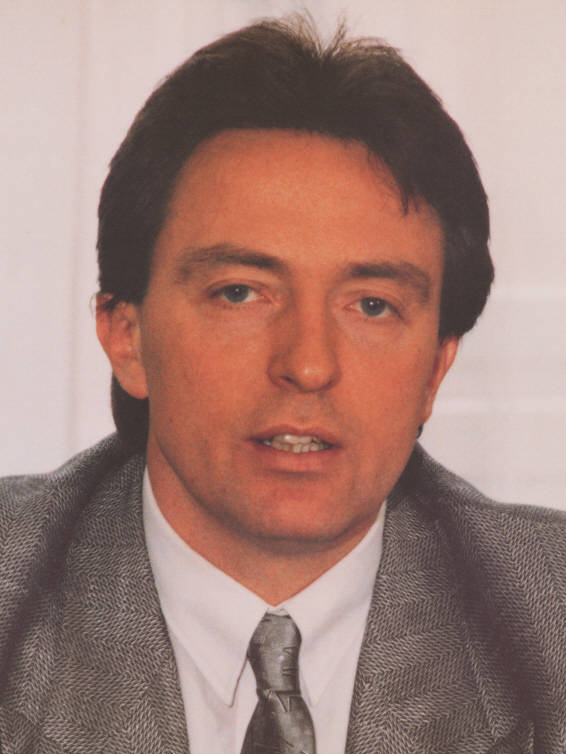
Peter-Michael Diestel, DSU frontrunner in the 1990 East German election

On 5 February 1990, DSU joined the Alliance for Germany together with the centre-right Christian Democratic Union (CDU) and the Democratic Awakening (Demokratischer Aufbruch, DA) to form the Alliance for Germany, a centre-right coalition which ran in the first (and only) free East German general election of 18 March 1990. The DSU polled 6.3% of the votes cast and 25 seats in the People's Chamber parliament. It achieved its strongest results in the southern districts of Karl-Marx-Stadt, Dresden and Leipzig (that later formed the state of Saxony), where the DSU polled two-digit percentages.

Its most prominent politician was the lawyer Peter-Michael Diestel, who joined the last East German cabinet (Council of Ministers) under Lothar de Maizière as minister of the interior and deputy prime minister. The DSU also held the ministry of economic cooperation, led by Hans-Wilhelm Ebeling. However, both Diestel and Ebeling left the party in June and July 1990, respectively, Diestel joined the CDU a month later. Of all parties in the People's Chamber, the DSU was the keenest on a swift reunification of East and West Germany. Its delegates repeatedly proposed a motion for East Germany's "immediate accession" to the Federal Republic of Germany.

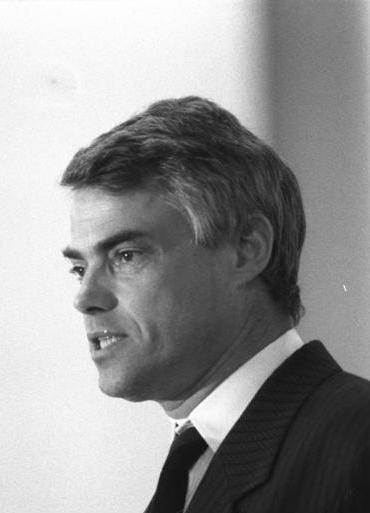
Hansjoachim Walther, party chairman (1990–1991)

Hansjoachim Walther, a mathematics professor, was elected chairman of the DSU on the first regular party congress in May 1990. Under his leadership, the party took a turn to the right, hosting national-conservative and in some cases even far-right voices. Unlike the other parliamentary parties and a vast majority of the population, numerous DSU members did not accept the Oder–Neisse line as Germany's eastern border (which was finally laid down in the reunification treaty and the Two Plus Four Agreement).

After German reunification was accomplished on 3 October 1990, eight DSU People's Chamber deputies entered into the Bundestag (federal parliament), where they joined the CDU/CSU parliamentary group. The Alliance for Germany coalition dissolved after that. In Chancellor Helmut Kohl's third cabinet, the DSU was represented by Hansjoachim Walther as federal minister without portfolio from October 1990 to January 1991. In the October 1990 legislative elections in the new German states, the DSU did not pass the five-percent threshold, winning 3.6% in its former stronghold of Saxony and even less in the other states, and thus failed to enter into any Landtag (state legislature).

Ahead of the first post-reunification German federal election on 2 December 1990, the Bavarian CSU aimed for a deal with the CDU to save its East German offshoot from irrelevance: If the CDU had abstained from competing in a few constituencies in Saxony and Thuringia, thus winning the DSU at least three "direct mandates", the small party could have been spared from the five-percent threshold and might have survived as a regional party. However, the CDU under Helmut Kohl insisted on the unwritten CDU/CSU agreement that the CSU may only run in Bavaria, while all other states are CDU's territory. Many DSU members realised that the party had no future and switched to the CDU. Eventually, DSU achieved 0.2% of nationwide votes, 1.0% in the new states. After this disappointment, the Bavarian CSU reduced its benefits to the DSU, but continued to transfer six-figure sums annually until 1993.

=== After 1990 ===
The DSU drifted further towards a nationalistic course, aiming for a position in between the centre-right CDU and the far-right Republicans. During the early-1990s, the party received support by the (West German) Neue Rechte ("New Right") movement, in particular by the Criticón magazine of Caspar von Schrenck-Notzing, who also attended DSU meetings. The DSU's image was then characterised by financial misconduct, internal squabbles, resignations, and contacts with far-right groups. The cooperation of DSU and CSU was definitely ended after the Spring 1993 party conference, when Roberto Rink was elected chairman of the DSU.

In subsequent elections its share of the vote has remained under 1% of the vote in all Landtag elections held in the new states. Electoral coalitions with right-wing parties like the German Party, the Party for a Rule of Law Offensive or the Statt Party led to no avail. Nevertheless, the DSU has a loyal following of voters on the local level, especially in some districts of Saxony. In the western states, the party is virtually nonexistent.

The DSU had one member in the Landtag of Saxony from 2006 to 2009, after the NPD parliamentarian Klaus Baier had defected from his party after a series of disputes and joined the DSU.
