= Democratic Awakening =

1989–1990 East German political party

Democratic Awakening Demokratischer Aufbruch
- Abbreviation: DA
- Leaders: Wolfgang Schnur; Rainer Eppelmann
- Founded: 29 October 1989
- Dissolved: 4 August 1990
- Merged into: Christian Democratic Union (East Germany)
- Headquarters: East Berlin
- Membership (1989): 10.000
- Ideology: Christian democracy German unionism Anti-communism
- Political position: Centre-right
- Colours: Black

Democratic Awakening (German: Demokratischer Aufbruch; also translated as Democratic Beginning) was an East German political movement and political party that was active during the Revolutions of 1989 and in the period leading up to the German reunification. While it was a relatively minor party, it took part in the first democratically elected government in East Germany in 1990, and is especially known because future Chancellor of Germany, Angela Merkel, started her political career within the party.

== History ==
It was founded on 29 October 1989, based on existing politically active church groups. Founding members included Wolfgang Schnur, Friedrich Schorlemmer, Rainer Eppelmann, Günter Nooke and Thomas Welz. The organisation became a political party on December 16/17, 1989 in Leipzig. The party convention adopted a more conservative program than some of the founding members, like Schorlemmer, were willing to bear, so they left the party. Others, like Nooke, who left some time later, resented the growing cooperation with the Christian Democratic Union (CDU) of East Germany, which had been a member of the Communist-dominated National Front of parties and mass organisations that had supported the Communist regime.

Democratic Awakening now supported rapid German reunification and joined the Alliance for Germany (Allianz für Deutschland) along with the CDU and German Social Union (DSU) for the 1990 Volkskammer elections on March 18. Only a few days prior to the elections, party chairman Schnur had to confess to having been an informer for the Ministry for State Security (Stasi), and resigned. Although Alliance for Germany won the elections, Democratic Awakening only received 0.9% of the vote, amounting to four seats in the Volkskammer. Eppelmann became minister for disarmament and defense in the new government and new party chairman. On 4 August 1990, Democratic Awakening ceased to exist after merging into the East German CDU, which in turn on 3 October 1990 merged into its West German counterpart, the Christian Democratic Union (CDU).

Angela Merkel joined DA in 1989 and, from February 1990, served as the party's spokeswoman. After the mergers, Merkel was elected in the post-unification election as a member of the all-German Bundestag for the CDU, was immediately appointed a minister in Helmut Kohl's government as a form of East German representation, became party chairwoman in 2000 and eventually Chancellor of Germany in 2005.
