= Alliance for Germany =

1990 electoral alliance in East Germany

Alliance for Germany Allianz für Deutschland
- Leader: Lothar de Maizière
- Founded: 5 February 1990
- Dissolved: 2 October 1990
- Merged into: Christian Democratic Union
- Ideology: German reunification; Christian democracy; Anti-communism
- Political position: Centre
- Member parties: Christian Democratic Union; German Social Union; Democratic Awakening

The Alliance for Germany (German: Allianz für Deutschland) was an electoral alliance in East Germany. It consisted of the Christian Democratic Union (CDU), Democratic Awakening (DA) and German Social Union (DSU).

The Alliance was formed in February 1990 to contest the 1990 East German general election, the first and only free election in the country's history. It ran on a centrist platform of expediting German reunification. The Alliance won a plurality of the seats in the Volkskammer. It led a coalition government that lasted until reunification in October, with Lothar de Maizière of the CDU serving as minister-president of East Germany.

== History ==
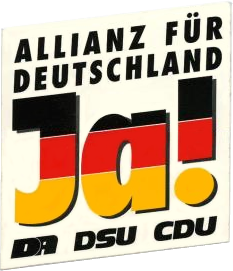
English: Alliance for Germany – Yes [to reunification]! – DA DSU CDU

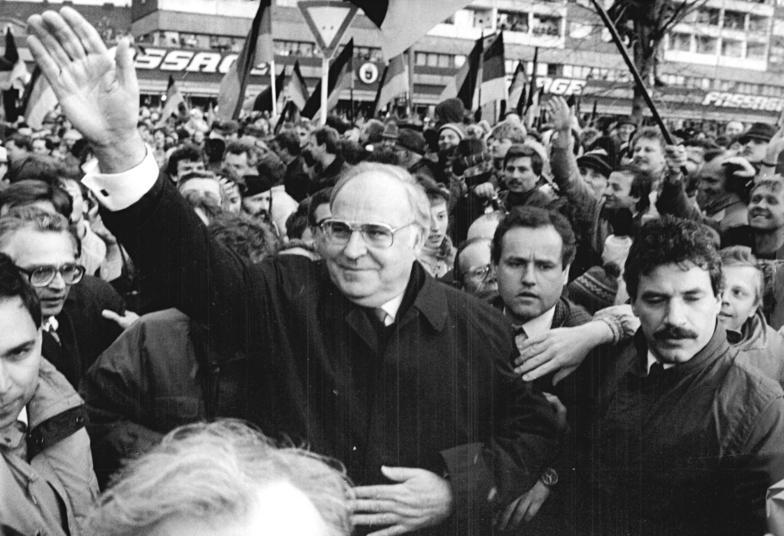
Helmut Kohl at an election rally of the Alliance for Germany

The Alliance for Germany announced its creation in a joint press statement by the Christian Democratic Union (CDU), Democratic Awakening (DA), and German Social Union (DSU) on 5 February 1990. The German Forum Party declined an invitation to join. The Alliance stated on 6 March that, if elected in the general election on 18 March, the primary goal of its government would be to expedite German reunification.

The Alliance won a plurality of the votes cast in the election (48.2% in total; CDU 40.9%, DSU 6.3%, DA 0.9%), and consequently a plurality of the seats (192 of 400) in the Volkskammer. The result was a surprise to many observers, who predicted the Social Democratic Party (SPD) to win a majority of votes and seats. The Alliance formed a coalition government with the SPD and Liberal Democratic Party, which lasted until reunification. Several Alliance and SPD leaders in the government were disgraced when their involvement in the Stasi became public; this included Lothar de Maizière of the CDU, who served as minister-president of East Germany.

== Election results ==
Volkskammer
Election	Leader	Votes	%	Place	Seats	Status
1990	Lothar de Maizière	5,544,474	48.04	1st	192 / 400	Government
