= United Left (East Germany) =

Political party in East Germany

United Left Vereinigte Linke
- Founded: 2 October 1989
- Dissolved: ~1992
- Membership (1989): 1,500
- Ideology: Socialism; Factions: Communism; Trotskyism; Christian socialism Titoism
- Colors: Red

The United Left (German: Vereinigte Linke) was an alliance of several leftist opposition groupings in the German Democratic Republic. Among them were Christian socialists, Trotskyists, adherents of the Titoist system of workers' self-management and some Socialist Unity Party of Germany (SED) members, who were critical of their party's policy.

== History ==
Founded on 2 October 1989, only a few weeks before the fall of the Berlin Wall, the United Left demanded a reformation of socialism with the stated goal of creating a free and democratic GDR. At the end of the year 1989 the party had 1,500 members with focal points in Berlin and Halle. In contrast to other East German opposition groups, the United Left received less support from Western governments and political parties. Organisational issues and internal tensions between the various ideological factions meant that the United Left only achieved limited political success during its existence.

At the first free elections in the GDR in March 1990, the United Left started together with "Die Nelken" ("The Carnations"), a Marxist party. The electoral alliance with the name "Aktionsbündnis Vereinigte Linke" gained 0.18% of the votes and one seat in the Volkskammer, which would be held by Thomas Klein. The United Left fell apart in the years after German reunification, but some members were elected to the Bundestag through a party-list of the PDS or The Greens.

== Election results ==
=== GDR Parliament (Volkskammer) ===
Election year	# of votes	% of votes	# of seats won	+/−	Notes
1990	20,342	0.2	1 / 400		
