= East German Green Party =

Political party in East Germany

Green Party Grüne Partei
- Founded: 9 February 1990
- Dissolved: 3 December 1990
- Merged into: Alliance 90/The Greens
- Headquarters: East Berlin, East Germany
- Ideology: Green politics
- Political position: Centre-left

The Green Party (German: Grüne Partei) in East Germany was founded in February 1990. At the first free Volkskammer elections it stood with the Independent Women's Association (Unabhängige Frauenverband) and received 2.0% of the vote. They received 8 seats but could not resolve how to allocate them. The Women's Association pulled out and the Green Party formed a joint parliamentary group with Bündnis 90.

The party was constituted on 24 November 1989 during the political upheavals of 1989, and from September 1990 used the name The Greens (Die Grünen). It merged on 3 December 1990 with the West German Greens (with the Saxon branch initially remaining outside the merger).

The Green Party developed largely out of the Green–Ecological Network Arche (Grün-Ökologisches Netzwerk Arche), founded in 1988 as a GDR-wide environmental opposition network. During 1989 it announced plans to contest future elections with a green list independent of the National Front's unified list, an early attempt in the GDR to challenge the National Front's monopoly on parliamentary representation.

== History ==
=== Origins in the environmental movement ===
The party's origins lay in the GDR environmental movement of the 1980s, where local groups formed in response to severe pollution and ecological damage and often operated under church umbrellas. Environmental activism initially overlapped closely with peace and human-rights campaigning, before increasingly developing its own organisational structures and priorities later in the decade.

=== From Arche to party formation (1988–1990) ===
The Green–Ecological Network Arche was founded in January 1988 and became a major organising nucleus for a later party structure. Debates within the environmental scene over centralisation and party-building delayed a formal foundation, so that other opposition parties and movements were founded earlier during autumn 1989. The Green Party was constituted on 24 November 1989, and formally founded at its first party congress in Halle on 9 February 1990.

=== Political participation in 1990 ===
In late 1989 and early 1990 the party participated in the Round Table process and took part in the transitional arrangements of the final GDR governments, including representation in the Modrow cabinet period through a minister without portfolio associated with the green camp. After the March 1990 Volkskammer election, the Green Party's eight deputies formed a joint parliamentary group with Bündnis 90, reflecting the practical need to organise parliamentary work and align with related citizens’ movements.

=== German reunification and merger (1990) ===
Following German reunification, coordination between East German civic movements and West German parties became central to electoral strategy and organisational survival. In September 1990 the party adopted the name “The Greens”, and on 3 December 1990 it merged with the West German Greens (with the Saxon branch initially remaining outside the merger).

== See also ==
- History of environmentalism in Germany
