= 1990 German federal election =

- 2 December 1990

All 662 seats in the Bundestag 332 seats needed for a majority
- Registered: 60,436,560 (▲33.3%)
- Turnout: 77.8% (▼6.5 pp)
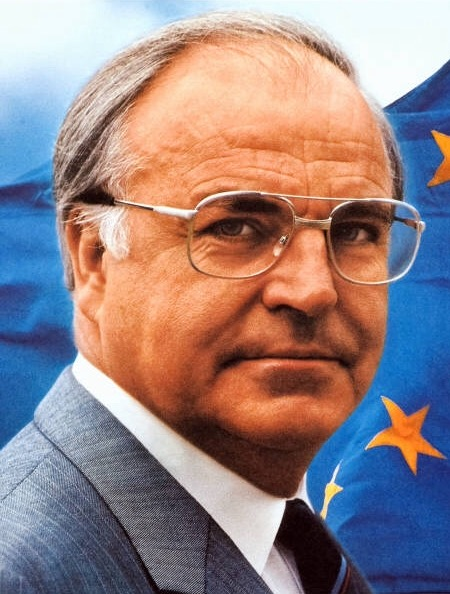

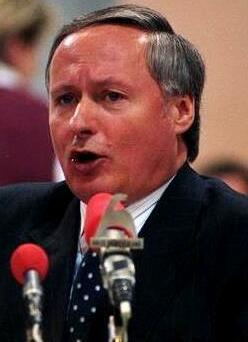

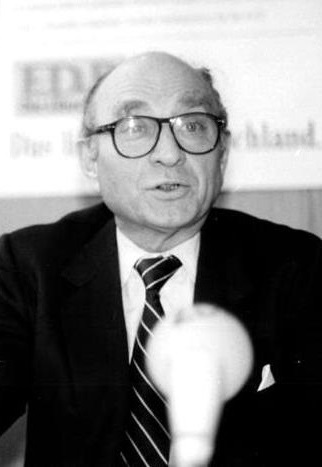

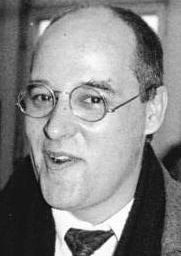
| | First party | Second party | Third party |
|---|---|---|---|
| Candidate | Helmut Kohl | Oskar Lafontaine | Otto Graf Lambsdorff |
| Party | CDU/CSU | SPD | FDP |
| Last election | 44.3%, 223 seats | 37.0%, 186 seats | 9.1%, 46 seats |
| Seats before | 297 (Note: Does not include 8 German Social Union guests.) | 226 | 57 |
| Seats won | 319 | 239 | 79 |
| Seat change | ▲14 | ▲13 | ▲22 |
| Popular vote | 20,358,096 | 15,545,366 | 5,123,233 |
| Percentage | 43.8% | 33.5% | 11.0% |
| Swing | ▼0.5 pp | ▼3.5 pp | ▲1.9 pp |
| | Fourth party | Fifth party |
| | | B90 |
| Candidate | Gregor Gysi | None |
| Party | PDS | Greens (East) (Note: A linked list of the Alliance 90 and the East German Green Party, running only in the new Eastern states.) |
| Last election | Did not exist | Did not exist |
| Seats before | 24 | 7 |
| Seats won | 17 | 8 |
| Seat change | ▼7 | ▲1 |
| Popular vote | 1,129,578 | 559,207 |
| Percentage | 2.4% (Note: In the 1990 election, the 5% electoral threshold was applied separately in the Western states and the new Eastern states. The PDS won 11.1% of votes in the new states.) | 1.2% (Note: In the 1990 election, the 5% electoral threshold was applied separately in the Western states and the new Eastern states. The Alliance 90–Eastern Greens grouping won 6.2% of votes in the new states.) |
| Swing | New party | New party |
- Results of the election. The main map shows constituency winners, and results for the proportional list seats are shown in the bottom left.
Government before election
Third Kohl cabinet
CDU/CSU/DSU–FDP
Government after election
Fourth Kohl cabinet
CDU/CSU-FDP

A federal election was held in recently united Germany on 2 December 1990 to elect the members of the 12th Bundestag, within the regular time of nearly four years after the January 1987 West German federal election. Due to the accession of the former East German states on 3 October, after which the Bundestag was expanded with East German Volkskammer delegates, the elections were the first democratic all-German elections since the early 1930s.

The result was a comprehensive victory for Chancellor Helmut Kohl and his governing coalition of the Christian Democratic Union/Christian Social Union and the Free Democratic Party (FDP), which was reelected to a third term (and a fourth in 1994). The second vote (preferred national party, first vote is for a local candidate) result of the CDU/CSU, 20,358,096 votes, remains the highest ever total vote count in a democratic German election.

The elections marked the first since 1957 that a party other than CDU/CSU and the Social Democratic Party (SPD) won a constituency seat (Direktmandat), breaking up the dominance of the two Volksparteien. The first (and only) time since 1957 that FDP won a constituency seat was by Uwe Lühr in Halle, home of Hans-Dietrich Genscher, the "architect of German reunification". In addition, Gregor Gysi (PDS) won Berlin-Marzahn – Hellersdorf.

== Campaign ==
This was the first election conducted after German reunification which took place on 3 October. Previously, the Volkskammer had selected 144 of its members which were then co-opted as Members of the German Bundestag and served until the end of the 11th Bundestag.

Almost 150 seats had been added to represent the re-established eastern states of Germany, without reducing the number of western members. The euphoria following the reunification gave the ruling CDU/CSU–FDP coalition a dramatic advantage in both Western and Eastern Germany throughout the campaign.

For this election only, the country was divided into two areas for the purposes of the five-percent threshold: the former West German states and West Berlin, and the former East German states and East Berlin. Second votes were counted separately in each area, and passing the threshold in either area was sufficient to enter the Bundestag and receive list seats. As a result, while the Western Greens (4.8% of western second votes) did not gain representation, their ideologically-similar Eastern Alliance 90 (6.2% of eastern second votes) did, with both merging to form Alliance 90/The Greens in 1993. The Party of Democratic Socialism also entered the Bundestag with 11.1% of eastern second votes, despite receiving just 0.3% of the western second vote (and only 2.4% nationwide). However, the distribution of seats to state lists was not divided in this manner and still calculated on the national level, which resulted in the PDS receiving a list seat (Ulla Jelpke) in the most populous state of North Rhine-Westphalia.

The German Social Union (DSU) under leader Hansjoachim Walther, a right-wing party modeled after the Bavarian CSU running only in former East Germany, failed to achieve the separate five percent hurdle, only receiving around 1% of the vote in the eastern states, mostly in the southeast. As part of the co-option, the DSU had previously had eight Members of the Bundestag, who sat as guests in the CDU/CSU caucus. The CSU, which had heavily supported the DSU financially, severed its ties in 1993 and the party fell into irrelevancy. After a law allowing a linkage of the lists of the CSU and DSU was overturned by the Federal Constitutional Court, the CSU tried to convince the CDU to stand down in several single-member constituencies to enable the DSU to enter the Bundestag separate from the 5% threshold, but Kohl adamantly refused.

== Results ==
All change figures are relative to the Bundestag as it existed after the grant of full voting member status to West Berlin's delegation and co-optation of Volkskammer members to represent East Germany.

| Party | Party-list | | | Constituency | | | Total seats | +/– |
| Party | Votes | % | Seats | Votes | % | Seats | Total seats | +/– |
|---|---|---|---|---|---|---|---|---|
| Christian Democratic Union | 17,055,116 | 36.71 | 76 | 17,707,574 | 38.27 | 192 | 268 | +12 |
| Social Democratic Party | 15,545,366 | 33.46 | 148 | 16,279,980 | 35.18 | 91 | 239 | +13 |
| Free Democratic Party | 5,123,233 | 11.03 | 78 | 3,595,135 | 7.77 | 1 | 79 | +22 |
| Christian Social Union | 3,302,980 | 7.11 | 8 | 3,423,904 | 7.40 | 43 | 51 | +2 |
| The Greens (West) | 1,788,200 | 3.85 | 0 | 2,037,885 | 4.40 | 0 | 0 | −44 |
| Party of Democratic Socialism | 1,129,578 | 2.43 | 16 | 1,049,245 | 2.27 | 1 | 17 | −7 |
| The Republicans | 987,269 | 2.13 | 0 | 767,652 | 1.66 | 0 | 0 | New |
| Alliance 90/Greens – Citizens' Movement (East) | 559,207 | 1.20 | 8 | 552,027 | 1.19 | 0 | 8 | +1 |
| The Grays – Gray Panthers | 385,910 | 0.83 | 0 | 218,412 | 0.47 | 0 | 0 | New |
| Ecological Democratic Party | 205,206 | 0.44 | 0 | 243,469 | 0.53 | 0 | 0 | 0 |
| National Democratic Party | 145,776 | 0.31 | 0 | 190,105 | 0.41 | 0 | 0 | 0 |
| German Social Union | 89,008 | 0.19 | 0 | 131,747 | 0.28 | 0 | 0 | −8 |
| Christian League | 39,640 | 0.09 | 0 | 8,667 | 0.02 | 0 | 0 | New |
| Christian Centre | 36,446 | 0.08 | 0 | 9,824 | 0.02 | 0 | 0 | New |
| Bavaria Party | 31,315 | 0.07 | 0 | 10,836 | 0.02 | 0 | 0 | 0 |
| The Women | 12,077 | 0.03 | 0 | 1,433 | 0.00 | 0 | 0 | 0 |
| Patriots for Germany | 4,687 | 0.01 | 0 | 746 | 0.00 | 0 | 0 | 0 |
| Eco-Union | 4,661 | 0.01 | 0 | 1,106 | 0.00 | 0 | 0 | 0 |
| Union of Working Groups for Employee Politics and Democracy | 4,530 | 0.01 | 0 | 704 | 0.00 | 0 | 0 | New |
| Communist Party of Germany | 1,630 | 0.00 | 0 | | | | 0 | New |
| Spartacist Workers' Party of Germany | 1,610 | 0.00 | 0 | 124 | 0.00 | 0 | 0 | New |
| Federation of German Democrats | 1,009 | 0.00 | 0 | 474 | 0.00 | 0 | 0 | New |
| Federation of Socialist Workers | 826 | 0.00 | 0 | 214 | 0.00 | 0 | 0 | New |
| Responsible Citizens | 492 | 0.00 | 0 | 72 | 0.00 | 0 | 0 | 0 |
| European Federalist Party | | | | 266 | 0.00 | 0 | 0 | New |
| Independents and voter groups | | | | 43,324 | 0.09 | 0 | 0 | 0 |
| Total | 46,455,772 | 100.00 | 334 | 46,274,925 | 100.00 | 328 | 662 | −1 |
| Valid votes | 46,455,772 | 98.85 | | 46,274,925 | 98.47 | | | |
| Invalid/blank votes | 540,143 | 1.15 | | 720,990 | 1.53 | | | |
| Total votes | 46,995,915 | 100.00 | | 46,995,915 | 100.00 | | | |
| Registered voters/turnout | 60,436,560 | 77.76 | | 60,436,560 | 77.76 | | | |
Source: Bundeswahlleiter

Seat results – SPD in red, combined Greens in green, PDS in purple, FDP in yellow, CDU/CSU in black

Winners by single-member constituency – SPD in red, PDS in purple, FDP in yellow, CDU/CSU in black

=== Results by state ===
Second vote (Zweitstimme, or votes for party list)

| State | CDU/CSU | SPD | FDP | Grüne | PDS | REP | Others |
|---|---|---|---|---|---|---|---|
| Baden-Württemberg | 46.5 | 29.1 | 12.3 | 5.7 | 0.3 | 3.2 | 2.9 |
| Bavaria | 51.9 | 26.7 | 8.7 | 4.6 | 0.2 | 5.0 | 2.9 |
| Berlin | 39.4 | 30.6 | 9.1 | 7.2 (Note: 3.9% West German Green Party, 3.3% East German Green Party/Alliance 90.) | 9.7 | 2.5 | 0.7 |
| Brandenburg | 36.3 | 32.9 | 9.7 | 6.6 | 11.0 | 1.7 | 1.8 |
| Bremen | 30.9 | 42.5 | 12.8 | 8.3 | 1.1 | 2.1 | 2.3 |
| Hamburg | 36.6 | 41.0 | 12.0 | 5.8 | 1.1 | 1.7 | 1.8 |
| Hesse | 41.3 | 38.0 | 10.9 | 5.6 | 0.4 | 2.1 | 1.7 |
| Lower Saxony | 44.3 | 38.4 | 10.3 | 4.5 | 0.3 | 1.0 | 1.2 |
| Mecklenburg-Vorpommern | 41.2 | 26.5 | 9.1 | 5.9 | 14.2 | 1.4 | 1.7 |
| North Rhine-Westphalia | 40.5 | 41.1 | 11.0 | 4.3 | 0.3 | 1.3 | 1.5 |
| Rhineland-Palatinate | 45.6 | 36.1 | 10.4 | 4.0 | 0.2 | 1.7 | 2.0 |
| Saarland | 38.1 | 51.2 | 6.0 | 2.3 | 0.2 | 0.9 | 1.3 |
| Saxony | 49.5 | 18.2 | 12.4 | 5.9 | 9.0 | 1.2 | 3.8 |
| Saxony-Anhalt | 38.6 | 24.7 | 19.7 | 5.3 | 9.4 | 1.0 | 1.3 |
| Schleswig-Holstein | 43.5 | 38.5 | 11.4 | 4.0 | 0.3 | 1.2 | 1.1 |
| Thuringia | 45.2 | 21.9 | 14.6 | 6.1 | 8.3 | 1.2 | 2.7 |
| Old states (West) | 44.3 | 35.7 | 10.6 | 4.8 | 0.3 | 2.3 | 2.0 |
| New states (East) | 41.8 | 24.3 | 12.9 | 6.2 | 11.1 | 1.5 | 2.3 |

==== Constituency seats ====
| State | Total seats | Seats won | | | | |
| State | Total seats | CDU | SPD | CSU | FDP | PDS |
|---|---|---|---|---|---|---|
| Baden-Württemberg | 37 | 36 | 1 | | | |
| Bavaria | 45 | | 2 | 43 | | |
| Berlin | 13 | 8 | 4 | | | 1 |
| Brandenburg | 12 | 7 | 5 | | | |
| Bremen | 3 | | 3 | | | |
| Hamburg | 7 | 1 | 6 | | | |
| Hesse | 22 | 13 | 9 | | | |
| Lower Saxony | 31 | 20 | 11 | | | |
| Mecklenburg-Vorpommern | 9 | 8 | 1 | | | |
| North Rhine-Westphalia | 71 | 33 | 38 | | | |
| Rhineland-Palatinate | 16 | 12 | 4 | | | |
| Saarland | 5 | | 5 | | | |
| Saxony | 21 | 21 | | | | |
| Saxony-Anhalt | 13 | 12 | | | 1 | |
| Schleswig-Holstein | 11 | 9 | 2 | | | |
| Thuringia | 12 | 12 | | | | |
| Total | 328 | 192 | 91 | 43 | 1 | 1 |

==== List seats ====
| State | Total seats | Seats won | | | | | |
| State | Total seats | SPD | FDP | CDU | PDS | CSU | B90/Gr. |
|---|---|---|---|---|---|---|---|
| Baden-Württemberg | 36 | 23 | 10 | 3 | | | |
| Bavaria | 41 | 24 | 9 | | | 8 | |
| Berlin | 15 | 5 | 3 | 4 | 2 | | 1 |
| Brandenburg | 10 | 2 | 2 | 1 | 3 | | 2 |
| Bremen | 3 | | 1 | 2 | | | |
| Hamburg | 7 | | 2 | 5 | | | |
| Hesse | 26 | 11 | 6 | 9 | | | |
| Lower Saxony | 34 | 16 | 7 | 11 | | | |
| Mecklenburg-Vorpommern | 7 | 3 | 1 | | 2 | | 1 |
| North Rhine-Westphalia | 75 | 27 | 17 | 30 | 1 | | |
| Rhineland-Palatinate | 18 | 9 | 4 | 5 | | | |
| Saarland | 6 | 1 | 1 | 4 | | | |
| Saxony | 19 | 8 | 5 | | 4 | | 2 |
| Saxony-Anhalt | 13 | 6 | 4 | | 2 | | 1 |
| Schleswig-Holstein | 13 | 8 | 3 | 2 | | | |
| Thuringia | 11 | 5 | 3 | | 2 | | 1 |
| Total | 334 | 148 | 78 | 76 | 16 | 8 | 8 |

== Post-election ==
The governing CDU/CSU-FDP coalition was returned to office with a landslide majority, and Helmut Kohl remained chancellor. The CDU did exceptionally well in the former East Germany, which had been the heartland of the SPD before the Nazi era.

== Sources ==
- The Federal Returning Officer
- Psephos
