= Volkskammer =

Highest organ of state power of East Germany

People's Chamber Volkskammer
- German Democratic Republic
- Emblem

Type
- Type: Unicameral (Note: Lower house of bicameral legislature until 8 December 1958)

History
- Founded: 7 October 1949; 77 years ago
- Disbanded: 3 October 1990; 36 years ago
- Preceded by: Reichstag (Nazi Germany) 1933–1945; Länderkammer (East Germany) 1949–1958
- Succeeded by: Bundestag

Leadership
- President: Johannes Dieckmann (first); Sabine Bergmann-Pohl (last)
- Vice President/Deputy President: (first presidium); Hermann Matern; Gerald Götting; Ernst Goldenbaum; Heinrich Homann; Vincenz Müller (last presidium); Reinhard Höppner; Käte Niederkirchner; Jürgen Schmieder; Wolfgang Ullmann; Stefan Gottschall

Structure
- Seats: 400
- Political groups: Government (303): CDU/DA (167) (Note: CDU (163); DA (4)); SPD (88); DSU (25); The Liberals (23) (Note: LDP (10); DFP (7); FDP (4); NDPD (2)); Opposition (97): PDS (66); Alliance 90/The Greens (20) (Note: Greens (8); New Forum (7); Democracy Now (3); Initiative for Peace and Human Rights (2)); DBD/DFD (10) (Note: DBD (9); DFD (1)); Non-attached (1) (Note: United Left (1)); Government (466) National Front: SED (110); CDU (67); LDPD (66); FDGB (49); NDPD (35); DBD (33); FDJ (25); KB (24); DFD (20); VVN-BdA (19); VdgB (12); SPD (6)

Elections
- First election: 15 October 1950
- Last election: 18 March 1990

Meeting place
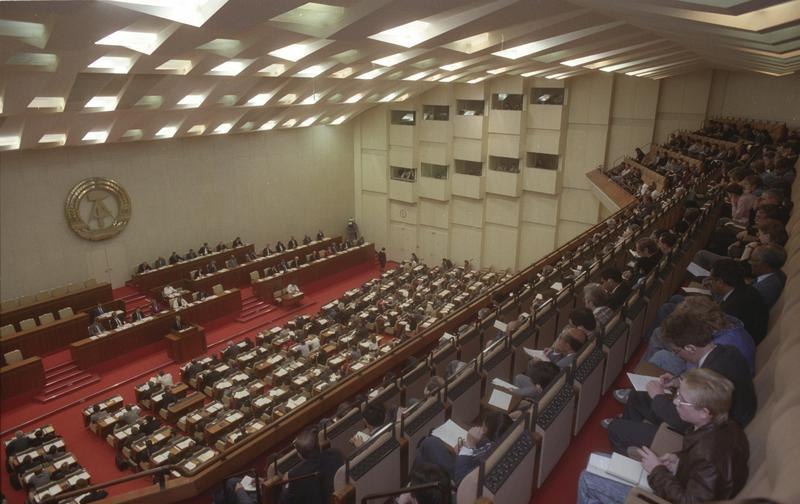
- Palace of the Republic, East Berlin

Constitution
- Constitution of East Germany

The Volkskammer (German: [ˈfɔlkskamɐ], "People's Chamber") was the parliament of the German Democratic Republic (GDR, East Germany). Formally, it was the supreme organ of power in the state, and (in accordance with the principle of unified power) its only branch of government, with all other state organs subservient to it. In practice, however, like most communist parliaments, it was a rubber stamp body that did little more than ratify decisions already made by the SED Politburo.

The Volkskammer was initially the lower house of a bicameral representative body. The upper house was the Länderkammer (Chamber of States), but in 1952 the states of East Germany were dissolved, and the Länderkammer was abolished in 1958. Constitutionally, the Volkskammer was the highest organ of state power in the GDR, and both constitutions vested it with great lawmaking powers. All other branches of government, including the judiciary, were responsible to it. By 1960, the chamber appointed the State Council (the GDR's collective head of state), the Council of Ministers (the GDR's government), and the National Defence Council (the GDR's collective military leadership).

By the 1970s and before the Peaceful Revolution, the Volkskammer only met two to four times a year.

== Membership ==
In October 1949 the Volksrat ("People's Council"), charged with drafting the Constitution of East Germany, proclaimed itself the Volkskammer and requested official recognition as a national legislature from the Soviet Military Administration in Germany. This was granted by Soviet Deputy Foreign Minister Andrei Gromyko. The Volkskammer then convened with the Länderkammer to elect Wilhelm Pieck as the first President of East Germany and Otto Grotewohl as the first Prime Minister of East Germany.

From its founding in 1949 until the first competitive elections in March 1990, all members of the Volkskammer were elected via a single list from the National Front, a popular front/electoral alliance dominated by the SED. In addition, seats were also allocated to various organizations affiliated with the SED, such as the Free German Youth. Effectively, the SED held control over the composition of the Volkskammer. In any event, the minor parties in the National Front were largely subservient to the SED, and were required to accept the SED's "leading role" as a condition of their continued existence.

The members of the People's Chamber were elected in multi-member constituencies, with four to eight seats. To be elected, a candidate needed to receive half of the valid votes cast in their constituency. If, within a constituency, an insufficient number of candidates got the majority needed to fill all the seats, a second round was held within 90 days. If the number of candidates getting this majority exceeds the number of seats in the respective constituency, the order of the candidates on the election list decided who got to sit in the Volkskammer. Candidates who lost out on a seat because of this would become successor candidates who would fill casual vacancies which might occur during a legislative period.

Only one list of candidates appeared on a ballot paper; voters simply took the ballot paper and dropped it into the ballot box. Those who wanted to vote against the National Front list had to vote using a separate ballot box, without any secrecy. The table below shows an overview of the reported results of all parliamentary elections before 1990, with the resulting disposition of parliamentary seats.

Election	Turnout	Agree	Distribution of parliamentary seats											
Election	Turnout	Agree	SED	CDU	LDPD	DBD	NDPD	FDGB	FDJ	KB	DFD	SPD	VdgB	VVN
1950	98.53%	99.9%	110	67	66	33	35	49	25	24	20	6	12	19
1954	98.51%	99.4%	117	52	52	52	52	53	29	29	18		12	
1958	98.9%	99.9%	117	52	52	52	52	53	29	29	18		12	
1963	99.25%	99.9%	127	52	52	52	52	68	40	35	22			
1967	99.82%	99.9%	127	52	52	52	52	68	40	35	22			
1971	98.48%	99.5%	127	52	52	52	52	68	40	35	22			
1976	98.58%	99.8%	127	52	52	52	52	68	40	35	22			
1981	99.21%	99.9%	127	52	52	52	52	68	40	35	22			
1986	99.74%	99.9%	127	52	52	52	52	68	37	21	32		14	

In 1976, the Volkskammer moved into a specially constructed building on Marx-Engels-Platz (now Schloßplatz, as it was before the birth of the DDR), the Palace of the Republic (Palast der Republik). Prior to this, the Volkskammer met at Langenbeck-Virchow-Haus in the Mitte district of Berlin.

Initially, voters in East Berlin could not take part in elections to the Volkskammer, in which they were represented by indirectly elected non-voting members, but in 1979 the electoral law was changed to provide for 66 directly elected deputies with full voting rights.

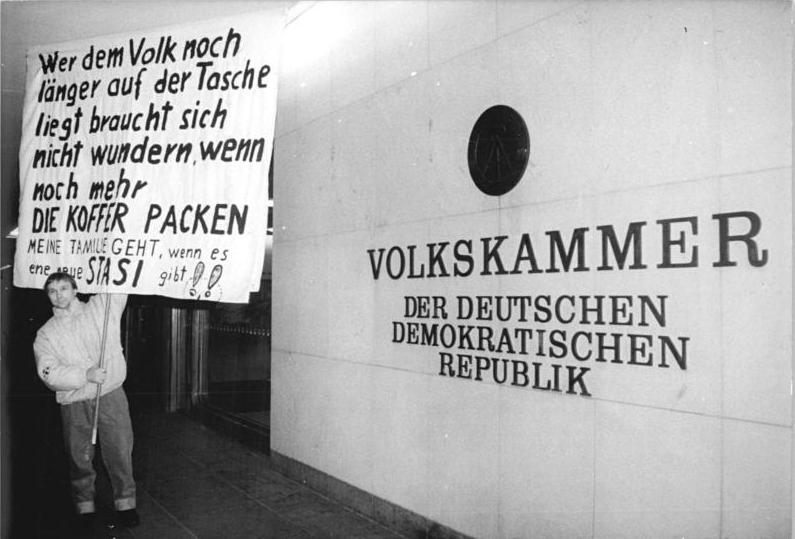
Protester, January 1990

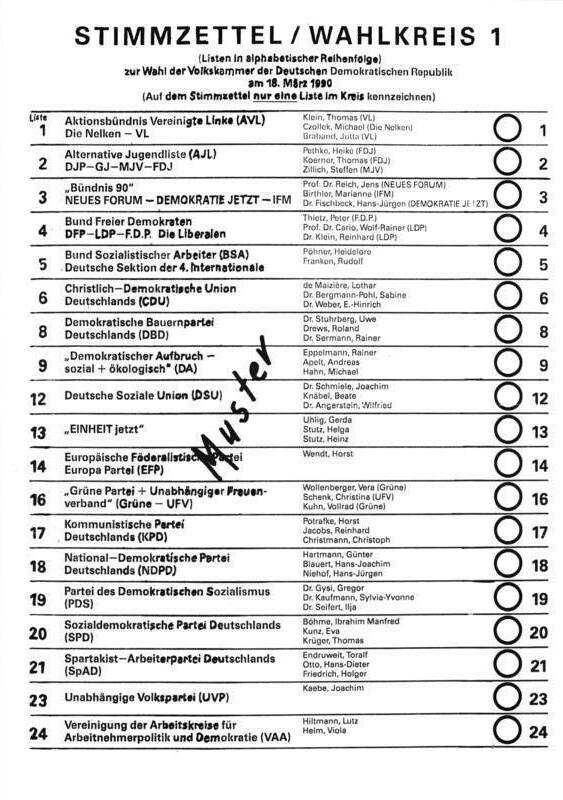
Ballot for the 1990 elections (written text reads "Sample")

With the advent of the Peaceful revolution, a new electoral law was passed on 20 February 1990, reducing the Volkskammer to 400 members and establishing their competitive election using party-list proportional representation, with no electoral threshold. Seats were calculated nationally using the largest remainder method, and distributed in multi-member constituencies corresponding to the fifteen Bezirke.

After the 1990 election, the disposition of the parties was as follows:

Party/Group	Acronym	Members
Alliance for Germany	CDU, DA, DSU	192
Social Democratic Party in the GDR	SPD	88
Party of Democratic Socialism	PDS, former SED	66
Association of Free Democrats	DFP, FDP, LDP	21
Alliance 90	B90	12
Green Party and Independent Women's Association	Grüne, UFV	8
National Democratic Party of Germany	NDPD	2
Democratic Women's League of Germany	DFD	1
United Left	VL	1

== Presidents of the chamber ==
The president of the People's Chamber was the third-highest state post in the GDR (after the chairman of the Council of Ministers and the chairman of the State Council) and was the designated acting president during the existence of the office of president. As such, on two occasions, the president of the People's Chamber served as acting president for brief periods in 1949 and 1960. The last president of the People's Chamber, Sabine Bergmann-Pohl, was also interim head of state during the last six months of East Germany's existence due to the State Council having been abolished.

The presidency of the People's Chamber was held by a bloc party representative for most of that body's existence to keep up the appearance that the GDR was led by a broad coalition. Only one SED member ever held the post.

Name	Entered office	Left office	Party
Johannes Dieckmann	7 October 1949	22 February 1969	LDPD
Gerald Götting	12 May 1969	29 October 1976	CDU
Horst Sindermann	29 October 1976	13 November 1989	SED
Günther Maleuda	13 November 1989	5 April 1990	DBD
Sabine Bergmann-Pohl	5 April 1990	2 October 1990	CDU

== Parties and organizations represented ==
=== National front parties ===
Party	Emblem	Flag	Foundation	Dissolution	Seats in the Volkskammer (1986)
Socialist Unity Party (SED)			21 April 1946	16 December 1989	127
Christian Democratic Union (CDU)			26 June 1945	1/2 October 1990	52
Liberal Democratic Party (LDPD)			5 July 1945	27 March 1990	52
Democratic Farmers' Party (DBD)			17 June 1948	15 September 1990	52
National Democratic Party (NDPD)			5 May 1948	27 March 1990	52

=== National front organizations ===
Organization	Emblem	Flag	Foundation	Dissolution	Assigned representatives in the Volkskammer (1986)
Free German Trade Union Federation (FDGB)			1946	1990	61
Free German Youth (FDJ)			1946	exists today	37
Democratic Women's League of Germany (DFD)			1947	1990	32
Cultural Association of the DDR (KB)			1945	1990	21
Peasants Mutual Aid Association (VdgB)			1945	1994	14

=== Parties and organizations in the 1990 Volkskammer ===
Party	Emblem	Foundation	Dissolution	Seats in the Volkskammer (1990 election)
Christian Democratic Union (CDU)		26 June 1945	1/2 October 1990	163
Social Democratic Party (SPD)		7 October 1989	26 September 1990	88
Party of Democratic Socialism (PDS)		16 December 1989	16 June 2007	66
German Social Union (DSU)		20 January 1990	exists today	25
Liberal Democratic Party (LDPD)		5 July 1945	27 March 1990	10
Democratic Farmers' Party (DBD)		17 June 1948	15 September 1990	9
Green Party (GP)		9 February 1990	3 December 1990	8
German Forum Party (DFP)		27 January 1990	11 August 1990	7
New Forum (NF)		9/10 September 1989	21 September 1991	7
Free Democratic Party (FDP)		4 February 1990	11 August 1990	4
Democratic Awakening (DA)		29 October 1989	4 August 1990	4
Democracy Now (DJ)		12 September 1989	21 September 1991	3
National Democratic Party (NDPD)		5 May 1948	27 March 1990	2
Initiative for Peace and Human Rights (IFM)		24 January 1986	21 September 1991	2
Democratic Women's League of Germany (DFD)		8 March 1947	26 October 1990	1
United Left (VL)		2 October 1989	1992	1

== Results ==
=== 1949 East German Constitutional Assembly election (first) ===
Party or alliance		Votes	%	Seats
Democratic Bloc (East Germany)	Socialist Unity Party of Germany	7,943,949	66.07	450
Democratic Bloc (East Germany)	Christian Democratic Union (East Germany)	7,943,949	66.07	225
Democratic Bloc (East Germany)	Liberal Democratic Party of Germany	7,943,949	66.07	225
Democratic Bloc (East Germany)	Cooperatives	7,943,949	66.07	100
Democratic Bloc (East Germany)	Democratic Farmers' Party of Germany	7,943,949	66.07	75
Democratic Bloc (East Germany)	National Democratic Party of Germany (East Germany)	7,943,949	66.07	75
Democratic Bloc (East Germany)	Democratic Women's League of Germany	7,943,949	66.07	50
Democratic Bloc (East Germany)	Free German Trade Union Federation	7,943,949	66.07	50
Democratic Bloc (East Germany)	Free German Youth	7,943,949	66.07	50
Democratic Bloc (East Germany)	Cultural Association of the GDR	7,943,949	66.07	50
Democratic Bloc (East Germany)	Peasants Mutual Aid Association	7,943,949	66.07	50
Democratic Bloc (East Germany)	Union of Persecutees of the Nazi Regime	7,943,949	66.07	50
Democratic Bloc (East Germany)	Social Democratic Party in the GDR	7,943,949	66.07	25
Democratic Bloc (East Germany)	Independents	7,943,949	66.07	50
Against		4,080,272	33.93	0
Total		12,024,221	100.00	1,525

=== 1986 East German general election (final under the SED) ===
Party or alliance		Votes	%	Seats
National Front of the German Democratic Republic	Socialist Unity Party of Germany	12,392,094	99.94	127
National Front of the German Democratic Republic	Free German Trade Union Federation	12,392,094	99.94	61
National Front of the German Democratic Republic	Christian Democratic Union (East Germany)	12,392,094	99.94	52
National Front of the German Democratic Republic	Liberal Democratic Party of Germany	12,392,094	99.94	52
National Front of the German Democratic Republic	National Democratic Party of Germany (East Germany)	12,392,094	99.94	52
National Front of the German Democratic Republic	Democratic Farmers' Party of Germany	12,392,094	99.94	52
National Front of the German Democratic Republic	Free German Youth	12,392,094	99.94	37
National Front of the German Democratic Republic	Democratic Women's League of Germany	12,392,094	99.94	32
National Front of the German Democratic Republic	Cultural Association of the GDR	12,392,094	99.94	21
National Front of the German Democratic Republic	Peasants Mutual Aid Association	12,392,094	99.94	14
Against		7,512	0.06	0
Total		12,399,606	100.00	500

=== 1990 East German general election (final) ===
Party or alliance		Votes	%	Seats	+/–
Alliance for Germany	Christian Democratic Union	4,710,598	40.82	163	+111
Alliance for Germany	German Social Union	727,730	6.31	25	New
Alliance for Germany	Democratic Awakening	106,146	0.92	4	New
Alliance for Germany	Total	5,544,474	48.04	192	+140
Social Democratic Party		2,525,534	21.88	88	New
Party of Democratic Socialism		1,892,381	16.40	66	–61
Association of Free Democrats		608,935	5.28	21	–31
Alliance 90		336,074	2.91	12	New
Democratic Farmers' Party		251,226	2.18	9	–43
Green Party–Independent Women's Association		226,932	1.97	8	New
National Democratic Party		44,292	0.38	2	–50
Democratic Women's League		38,192	0.33	1	–31
United Left		20,342	0.18	1	New
Alternative Youth List (DJP–GJ–MJV–FDJ)		14,616	0.13	0	–37
Christian League		10,691	0.09	0	New
Communist Party		8,819	0.08	0	New
Independent Social Democratic Party		3,891	0.03	0	New
European Federalist Party		3,636	0.03	0	New
Independent People's Party		3,007	0.03	0	New
German Beer Drinkers' Union		2,534	0.02	0	New
Spartacist Workers Party		2,417	0.02	0	New
Unity Now		2,396	0.02	0	New
Federation of Socialist Workers		386	0.00	0	New
Association of Working Groups for Work Policy and Democracy		380	0.00	0	New
Total		11,541,155	100.00	400	0
Valid votes		11,541,155	99.45		
Invalid/blank votes		63,263	0.55		
Total votes		11,604,418	100.00		
Registered voters/turnout		12,426,443	93.38		
Source: Nohlen & Stöver, IPU, Wahlen in Deutschland

== See also ==
- Elections in East Germany
- Presidium of the People's Chamber
- Show election
