= Hartmut Sieckmann =

German engineer and politician

- Born: 19 August 1943 (age 82); Bautzen, Saxony, Germany
- Occupation: Politician
- Political party: FDP

Hartmut Sieckmann (born 19 August 1943, in Bautzen) is a German engineer and regional politician (FDP).

In 2013, now aged 70, after many years during which he had stepped back from public life, he returned to local politics as a local minister in his Thuringia home region.

== Life ==
=== Early years ===
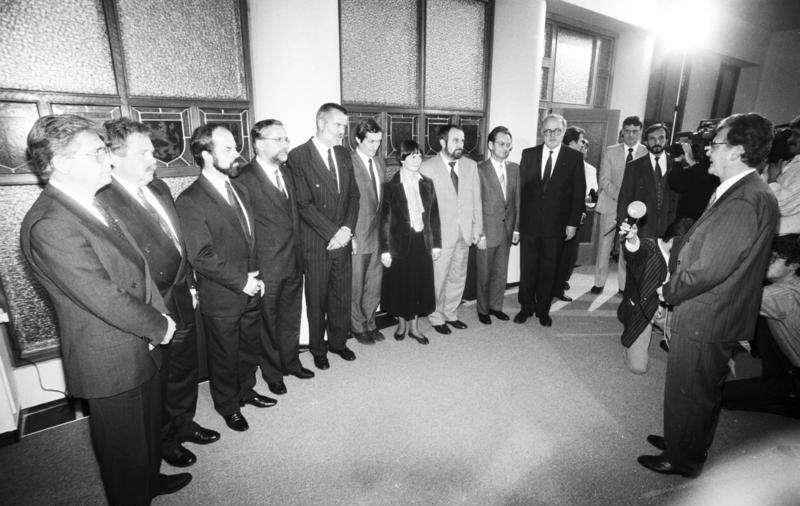
State government of Thuringia 1990 by Ralph Hirschberger

Hartmut Sieckmann was born in Saxony the southern part of what was when central Germany. His father was a lawyer. Before his second birthday the war had ended and the region had become part of the Soviet occupation zone of Germany. During the next few years some of the vestiges of Nazi Germany were swept away and the Soviet occupation zone was politically transformed under Soviet sponsorship. In October 1949 it was re-founded as a new separate Germany, the German Democratic Republic, once more a one-party state, still sustained by the Soviets, and with political institutions closely modeled on those of the Soviet Union itself. Sieckmann attended school in Weimar, still in the German Democratic Republic, but well to the west of the frontier town in the south of Saxony where he had been born. He left school without, at this stage, completing his Abitur, the school completion exam which, in Germany, academically focused and ambitious children are encouraged to pass at this stage. However, between 1960 and 1963 he undertook an apprenticeship as a tool maker. In addition between 1961 and 1963 he attended evening classes at college in Weimar at the end of which he passed his Abitur. He was then able to move on and study mechanical engineering at the Dresden Technical Academy, emerging with a degree in 1969.

=== The engineer ===
From 1970 till 1989 he worked as a project engineer with the massive electronic manufacturer, VEB Robotron, in Dresden. From 1984 till 1986 he also worked on a post-graduate project on air quality at the Technical Academy for Chemistry at Merseburg. At the same time, from 1975 till 1987 he was working for a Collective for Environmental Protection and Water Economics.

=== Politics ===
Although the German Democratic Republic had been formally founded only in 1949, the basis for a return to one-party government had been established in April 1946, with the contentious merger of the old Communist Party with the Moderate-left SPD. Other parties were grouped together and controlled in a structure called the National Front, operated by the merged SED (party). That all changed in 1989 as the country's ruling elite lost self-confidence and the Soviet troops still stationed in the country demonstrated that they had no instructions to back violent suppression of the sustained campaign of political protest that was a feature of East Germany that year. In 1989 a new Free Democratic Party was founded in East Germany, at his stage still separate from the existing Liberal Democratic Party (which was a constituent element of the National Front). Early in 1990 Hartmut Sieckmann was co-founder of the new Free Democratic Party in Thuringia. Shortly thereafter the reunification process taking place in Germany was mirrored in the unification of the Eastern and Western FDPs, which left Sieckmann as a member of the German FDP. From 1990 till 1998 he was a member of the FDP regional party leadership in Thuringia, serving as deputy regional party president from 1990 till 1994.

Between 1950 and 1989 East German elections were held according to a system that ensured 99% support for the ruling SED (party). Free elections returned in 1990, however, and in October 1990 elections were held for the Regional Legislature (Landtag) in Thuringia. The FDP won 9.3% of the vote which entitled them to 9 seats in the new assembly. Hartmut Sieckmann's name was at the top of the party's candidate list and he was accordingly elected a member of the Landtag, remaining a member till 1994.

On 8 November 1990 Sieckmann was appointed to the Duchač cabinet as the regional minister for Rural Planning and the Environment. He retained his job when Josef Duchac was succeeded as Thuringia's Minister-president by Bernhard Vogel in February 1992. He resigned from the regional government in November 1994, however, following a collapse of the FDP vote in the Regional elections that year.
