= Martin Hagen =

Martin Hagen may refer to:

- Martin Hagen (biathlete)
- Martin Hagen (politician)
