= Bruno Menzel =

German politician (1932–1996)

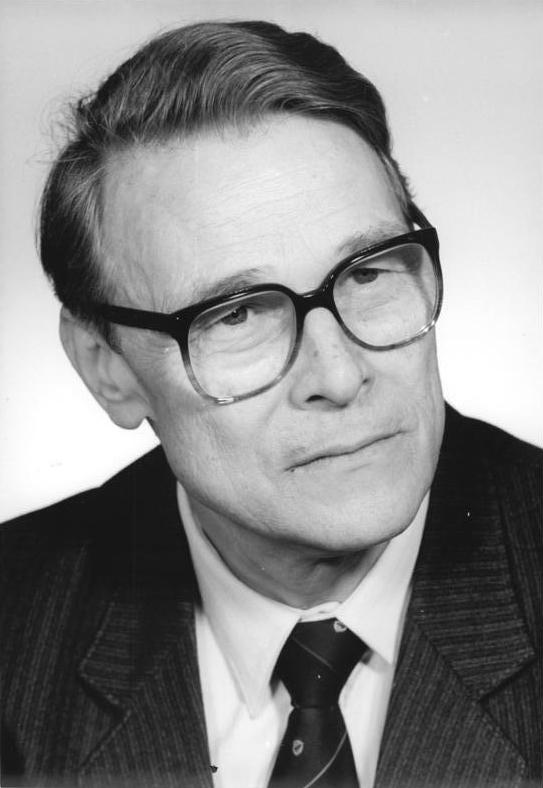
- Menzel in 1990

Member of the Bundestag for Saxony-Anhalt
- In office 20 December 1990 – 10 November 1994
- Preceded by: Constituency established
- Succeeded by: Uwe Lühr

Chairman of the Free Democratic Party of the GDR
- In office 4 February 1990 – 11 August 1990
- Preceded by: Position established
- Succeeded by: Position abolished Otto Graf Lambsdorff (as Federal Chairman of the FDP)

Personal details
- Born: Bruno Menzel; 25 February 1932 Dessau, Free State of Anhalt, Weimar Republic (now Saxony-Anhalt, Germany)
- Died: 14 September 1996 (aged 64) Dessau, Saxony-Anhalt, Germany
- Party: Free Democratic Party (1990–1996)
- Other political affiliations: Free Democratic Party of the GDR (1990)
- Education: Martin Luther University Halle-Wittenberg (Dr. med.)
- Occupation: Politician; Physician

Bruno Menzel (25 February 1932 – 14 September 1996) was a German politician of the Free Democratic Party (FDP).

A physician by trade, Menzel became politically active during the Peaceful Revolution, co-founding the Free Democratic Party of the GDR and serving as their only leader until the merger with the West German FDP. He afterward was elected to the Bundestag, retiring in 1994 and dying soon thereafter.

== Life and career ==
=== Physician ===
After passing his Abitur in 1950, Menzel began studying medicine at the University of Halle, completing his state exam and doctorate in medicine (Dr. med.) in 1956.

He trained as a specialist in internal medicine until 1961, and also trained as a subspecialist in infectious diseases and tropical medicine. He then became head of the 3rd medical clinic at the district hospital in Dessau and later served as the leading chief physician there.

The Society for Infectious and Tropical Medicine elected him as its deputy chair; he also served as chairman of the local chapter of the German Red Cross in the GDR.

=== Peaceful Revolution ===
Menzel became politically active during the Peaceful Revolution in the GDR. In January 1990, he was one of the co-founders of the Committee for the Formation of a Free Democratic Party in the GDR, and in the following month, he was elected chairman at the party's founding convention in wealthy Berlin-Weißensee. He was the favored candidate of the West German FDP leadership because he was not as opposed to a possible merger with a renewed LDPD as the East Berlin founding circle.

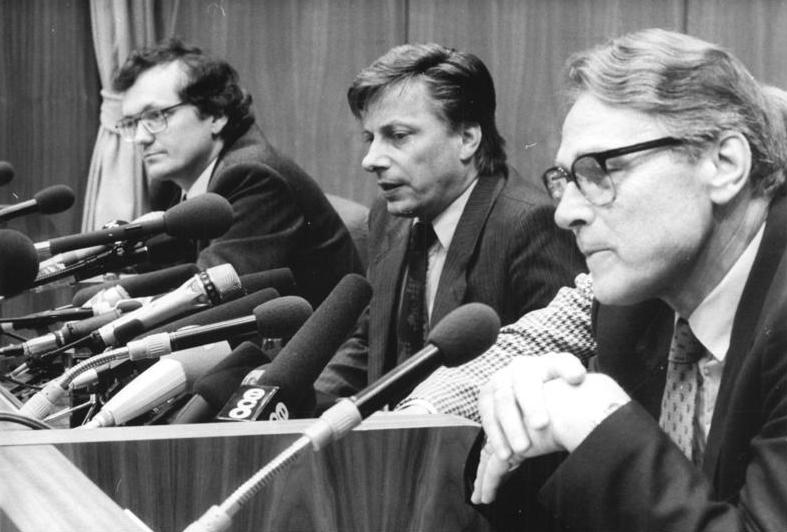
Menzel (right) alongside German Forum Party leader Jürgen Schmieder and LDP leader Rainer Ortleb at a post-election press conference announcing plans to merge their parties

Shortly afterward, he led the party into an electoral alliance with the now renamed LDP and the German Forum Party called Association of Free Democrats (German: Bund Freier Demokraten) (BFD) for the Volkskammer election in March.

The party struggled, it had low membership and it was hardly possible to build up its own structures. Even the West German FDP paid more attention to the former bloc party LDP with its over 100,000 members.

The BFD ultimately elected 21 members to the Volkskammer, including, initially, only 4 GDR-FDP members. Menzel himself was elected to the Volkskammer for Bezirk Halle, being the first-placed candidate on the BFD list. However, he resigned from his mandate before the first session to focus more on party work. He was replaced by LDP member Gerry Kley.

After merging with the West German FDP into the unified FDP in August 1990, Menzel became their deputy chairman, a position he held until 1992. He was re-elected as a member of the federal board at the party congresses in 1993 and 1995.

=== Reunified Germany ===
In the 1990 federal election, he was elected to parliament via the state list of Saxony-Anhalt. There, he served as deputy chairman of the FDP parliamentary group. From 1990 to 1994, Menzel also served as German representative in the Parliamentary Assembly of the Council of Europe and in the Assembly of the Western European Union.

In 1992, Menzel became deputy chairman of the FDP in Saxony-Anhalt. When embattled chairman Peter Kunert resigned after the disastrous results of the June 1994 state election, Menzel, who himself would not be re-elected to the Bundestag in the 1994 federal election, took over as acting leader until the party elected Cornelia Pieper in early 1995.

Menzel died in 1996 at the age of 64.
