= 1990 Mecklenburg-Vorpommern state election =

German state election

- 14 October 1990

All 66 seats in the Landtag of Mecklenburg-Vorpommern 34 seats needed for a majority
- Turnout: 895,999 (64.7%)
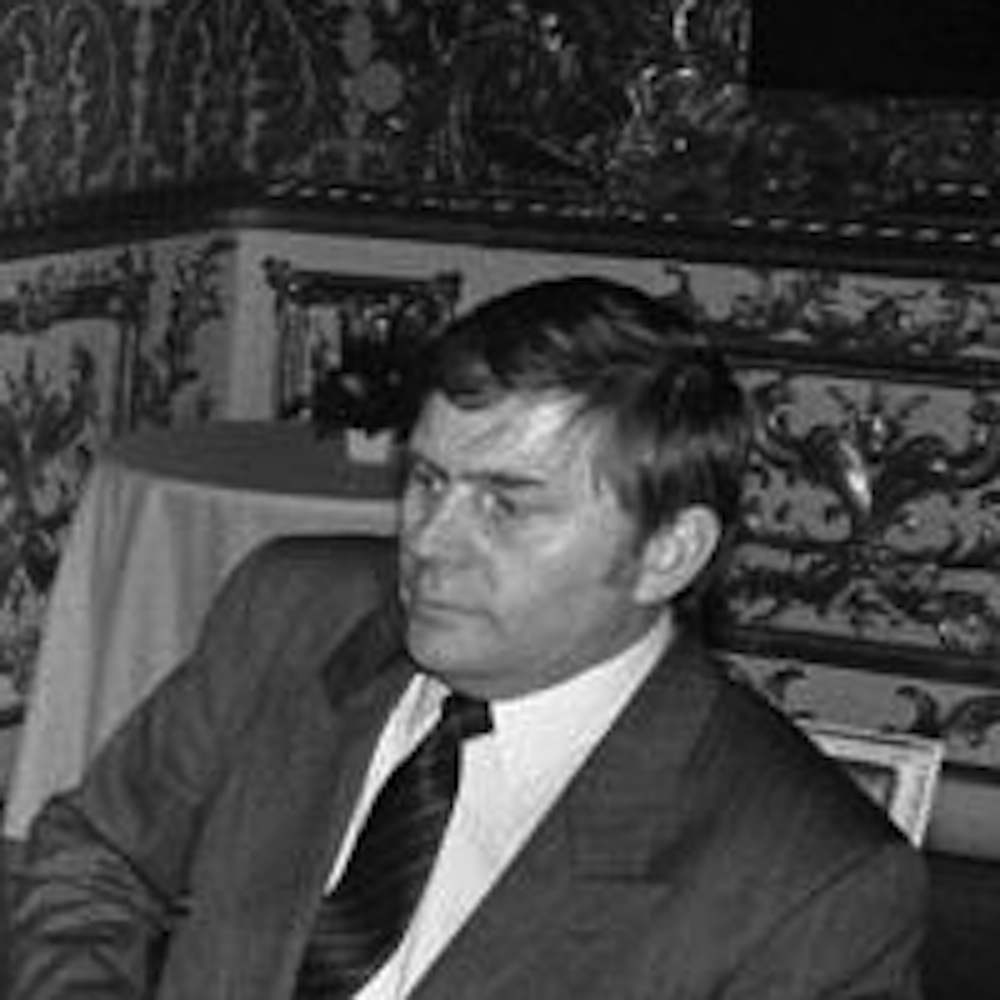
	First party	Second party
Leader	Alfred Gomolka	Klaus Klingner
Party	CDU	SPD
Seats won	29	21
Popular vote	343,447	242,147
Percentage	38.3%	27.0%
	Third party	Fourth party
Party	PDS	FDP
Seats won	12	4
Popular vote	140,397	49,104
Percentage	15.7%	5.5%
- Results for the single-member constituencies
Elected Minister-President
Alfred Gomolka
CDU

The 1990 Mecklenburg-Vorpommern state election was held on 14 October 1990 to elect the members of the first Landtag of Mecklenburg-Vorpommern. It was the first election held in Mecklenburg-Vorpommern since the reunification of Germany, which had taken place on 3 October.

The Christian Democratic Union (CDU) led by Alfred Gomolka emerged as the largest party with 38.3% of the vote, followed by the Social Democratic Party (SPD) with 27.0%, but with one of its 21 seats already lost: Wolfgang Schulz had left the party on 11 September due to allegations within the party. He remained on the SPD ticket of constituency Hansestadt Rostock II, and was elected as direct member.

The parliament with its 66 seats was in a numerical deadlock: CDU and Free Democratic Party (FDP), the coalition that ruled West Germany and then united Germany under chancellor Kohl from 1982 to 1998, had won a combined 33 seats, but when Schulz decided to support CDU, it was 34 to 32. The CDU subsequently formed a coalition with the FDP, and Gomolka became Mecklenburg-Vorpommern's first post-reunification Minister-President.

== Parties ==
The table below lists parties which won seats in the election.

Name		Ideology	Leader(s)
CDU	Christian Democratic Union of Germany; Christlich Demokratische Union Deutschlands	Christian democracy	Alfred Gomolka
SPD	Social Democratic Party of Germany; Sozialdemokratische Partei Deutschlands	Social democracy	Klaus Klingner
PDS	Party of Democratic Socialism; Partei des Demokratischen Sozialismus	Democratic socialism	
FDP	Free Democratic Party; Freie Demokratische Partei	Classical liberalism	

== Election result ==
Summary of the 14 October 1990 election results for the Landtag of Mecklenburg-Vorpommern
Party	Votes	%	Seats	Seats %
Christian Democratic Union (CDU)	343,447	38.3	29	43.9
Social Democratic Party (SPD)	242,147	27.0	21	31.8
Party of Democratic Socialism (PDS)	140,397	15.7	12	18.2
Free Democratic Party (FDP)	49,104	5.5	4	6.1
The Greens (Grüne)	37,336	4.2	0	0
New Forum (NF)	26,230	2.9	0	0
Alliance 90 (B90)	19,948	2.2	0	0
Christian Social Union (CSU)	9,975	1.1	0	0
Others	27,415	3.1	0	0
Total	895,999	100.0	66	
Voter turnout		64.7		

Popular Vote
CDU	38.33%
SPD	27.03%
PDS	15.67%
FDP	5.48%
GRÜNE	4.17%
NF	2.93%
B90	2.23%
CSU	1.11%
Other	3.06%

Landtag seats
CDU	43.94%
SPD	31.82%
PDS	18.18%
FDP	6.06%

== Sources ==
- Landtagswahlen Mecklenburg-Vorpommern
