= Martin Hagen (politician) =

German politician (born 1981)

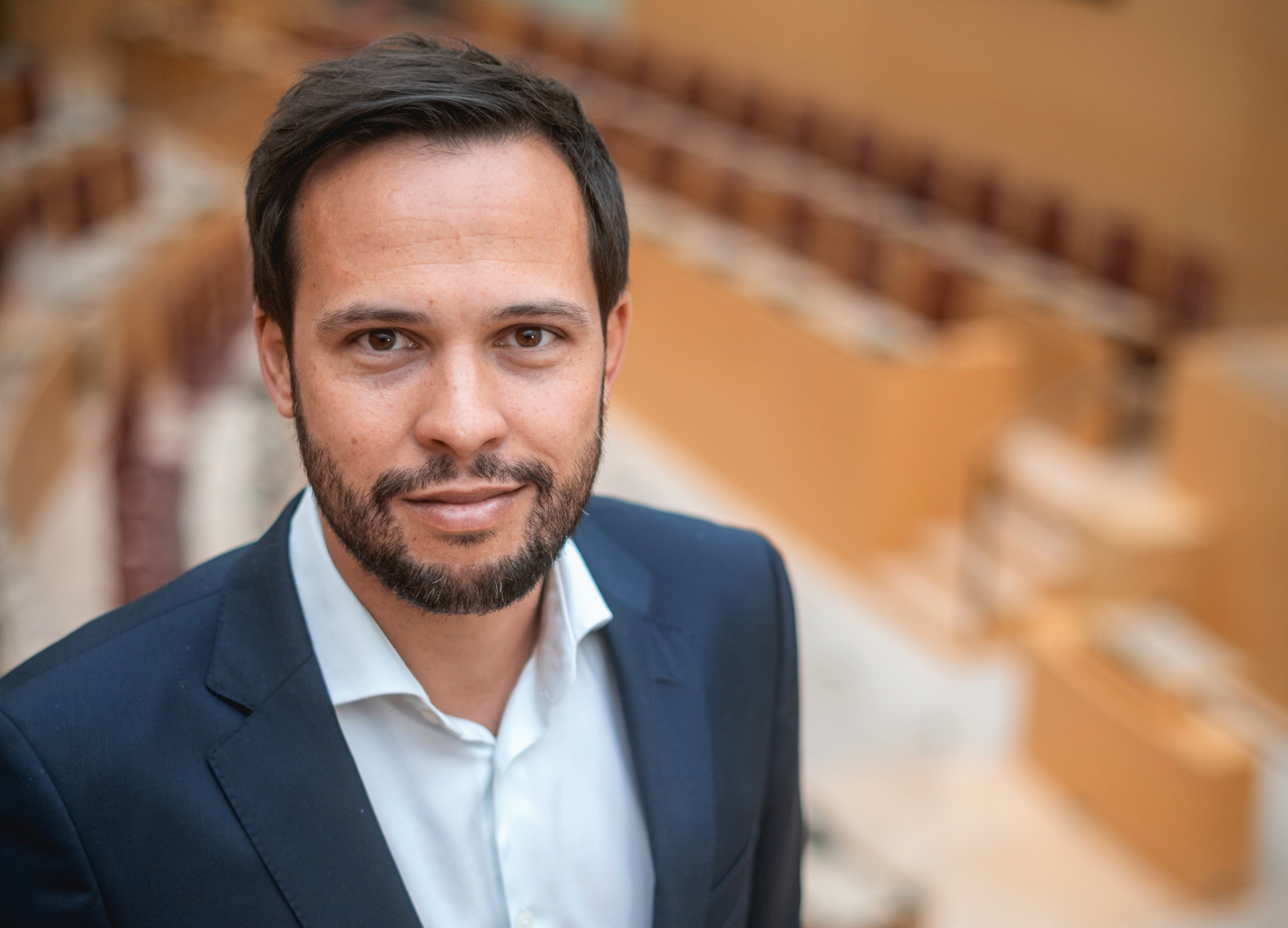
Hagen in 2021

Martin Hagen (born 7 July 1981 in La Spezia) is a German politician. He is the Secretary General of the Free Democratic Party. From 2018 to 2023, he was the partie's parliamentary group leader in the Landtag of Bavaria. Hagen currently serves as a municipal councilor in Vaterstetten.

Hagen was the lead candidate in the 2018 Bavarian State election, in which he led his party back into parliament, and the 2023 Bavarian state election in which they were wiped out. He was also the top candidate on the state list in Bavaria for the FDP in the 2025 German federal election.

From 2024 to 2026, Hagen worked as CEO of a political thinktank.
