= Free Democratic Party =

Political party in Germany

Free Democratic Party Freie Demokratische Partei
- Abbreviation: FDP
- Leader: Wolfgang Kubicki
- General Secretary: Martin Hagen
- Founded: 12 December 1948; 77 years ago
- Merger of: Democratic Party of Germany; Democratic People's Party
- Headquarters: Hans-Dietrich-Genscher-Haus; Reinhardtstraße 14; 10117 Berlin
- Newspaper: fdplus
- Youth wing: Young Liberals
- Women's wing: Liberal Women
- University wing: Federal Associations of Liberal College Groups
- Foundation: Friedrich Naumann Foundation
- Membership (September 2026): ▼63.000
- Ideology: Liberalism (German)
- Political position: Centre-right
- European affiliation: Alliance of Liberals and Democrats for Europe
- European Parliament group: Renew Europe
- International affiliation: Liberal International
- Colours: Yellow; Blue
- Bundestag: 0 / 630
- Bundesrat: 1 / 69
- European Parliament: 5 / 96
- State Parliaments: 30 / 1,875

Website
- fdp.de

The Free Democratic Party (German: Freie Demokratische Partei, FDP, German pronunciation: [ɛfdeːˈpeː]) is a liberal political party in Germany. The FDP was founded in 1948 by members of former liberal political parties in Germany before World War II, namely the German Democratic Party and the German People's Party. For most of the second half of the 20th century, when West Germany was a two-party country, the FDP as third party determined the balance of power in the Bundestag. It has been a junior coalition partner to both the Christian Democratic Union (1949–1956, 1961–1966, 1982–1998, and 2009–2013) and the Social Democratic Party (1969–1982 and 2021–2024).

After an all-time high result in 2009 and four years in government under CDU Chancellor Angela Merkel, with a flip-flop stance towards nuclear power, in the 2013 federal election the FDP came up short of the 5 percent threshold, being left without representation in the Bundestag for the first time in its history. In the 2017 federal election, the FDP regained its representation in the Bundestag, receiving 10.6% of the vote. After the 2021 federal election the FDP was part of the governing Scholz cabinet in a "traffic light coalition" with the SPD and the Greens. Disastrous state election results and leader Christian Lindner's stance against public debt led to the November 2024 German government crisis and the February 2025 federal snap election. The FDP again came up short of the 5 percent threshold in that election and is currently out of the Bundestag. Already out of most state parliaments, in 2026 the party lost representation in its stronghold of Baden-Württemberg and Rhineland-Palatinate where it had served as a junior coalition partner. In September, it was also wiped out in the state parliaments of Saxony-Anhalt, Mecklenburg-Vorpommern, and Berlin.

Apart from a brief progressive and social liberal period in the 1970s (Freiburger Thesen), the FDP has traditionally been positioned on the centre-right of the political spectrum. Since the 1980s, the party, consistently with its ordoliberal tradition, has pushed economic liberalism and has aligned itself closely to the promotion of free markets and privatisation. The FDP is a member of the Liberal International, the Alliance of Liberals and Democrats for Europe, and Renew Europe.

== History ==
=== Predecessors ===
The history of liberal parties in Germany dates back to 1861, when the German Progress Party (DFP) was founded, being the first political party in the modern sense in Germany. From the establishment of the National Liberal Party in 1867 until the demise of the Weimar Republic in 1933, the liberal-democratic camp was divided into a national-liberal and a left-liberal line of tradition. After 1918, the national-liberal strain was represented by the German People's Party (DVP), the left-liberal one by the German Democratic Party (DDP, which merged into the German State Party in 1930). Both parties played an important role in government during the Weimar Republic era, but successively lost votes during the rise of the Nazi Party beginning in the late-1920s. After the Nazi seizure of power, both liberal parties agreed to the Enabling Act of 1933 and subsequently dissolved themselves. During the 12 years of Hitler's rule, some former liberals collaborated with the Nazis (e.g. economy minister Hjalmar Schacht), while others resisted actively against Nazism, with some Liberal leaning members and former members of the military joining up with Henning von Tresckow (e.g. the Solf Circle).

Soon after World War II, the Soviet Union pushed for the creation of licensed anti-fascist parties in its occupation zone in East Germany. In July 1945, former DDP politicians Wilhelm Külz, Eugen Schiffer, and Waldemar Koch called for the establishment of a pan-German liberal party. Their Liberal-Democratic Party (LDP) was soon licensed by the Soviet Military Administration in Germany, under the condition that the new party joined the pro-Soviet Democratic Bloc.

In September 1945, citizens in Hamburg—including the anti-Nazi resistance circle Association Free Hamburg—established the Party of Free Democrats (PFD) as a bourgeois left-wing party and the first liberal Party in the Western occupation zones. The German Democratic Party was revived in some states of the Western occupation zones (in the Southwestern states of Württemberg-Baden and Württemberg-Hohenzollern under the name of Democratic People's Party).

Many former members of DDP and DVP however agreed to finally overcome the traditional split of German liberalism into a national-liberal and a left-liberal branch, aiming for the creation of a united liberal party. In October 1945 a liberal coalition party was founded in the state of Bremen under the name of Bremen Democratic People's Party. In January 1946, liberal state parties of the British occupation zone merged into the Free Democratic Party of the British Zone (FDP). A similar state party in Hesse, called the Liberal Democratic Party, was licensed by the U.S. military government in January 1946. In the state of Bavaria, a Free Democratic Party was founded in May 1946.

In the first post-war state elections in 1946, liberal parties performed well in Württemberg-Baden (16.8%), Bremen (18.3%), Hamburg (18.2%) and Greater Berlin (still undivided; 9.3%). The LDP was especially strong in the October 1946 state elections of the Soviet zone—the last free parliamentary election in East Germany—obtaining an average of 24.6% (highest in Saxony-Anhalt, 29.9%, and Thuringia, 28.5%), thwarting an absolute majority of the Socialist Unity Party of Germany (SED) that was favoured by the Soviet occupation power. This disappointment to the Communists led to a change of electoral laws in the Soviet zone, cutting the autonomy of non-socialist parties including the LDP and forcing it to join the SED-dominated National Front, making it a dependent bloc party.

The Democratic Party of Germany (DPD) was established in Rothenburg ob der Tauber on 17 March 1947 as a pan-German party of liberals from all four occupation zones. Its leaders were Theodor Heuss (representing the DVP of Württemberg-Baden in the American zone) and Wilhelm Külz (representing the LDP of the Soviet zone). However, the project failed in January 1948 as a result of disputes over Külz's pro-Soviet direction.

=== Founding of the party ===
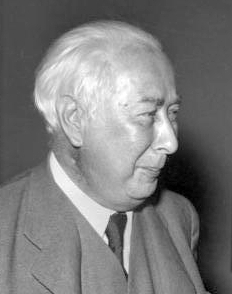
Theodor Heuss, first chairman of the FDP and first President of West Germany

The Free Democratic Party was established on 11–12 December 1948 in Heppenheim, in Hesse, as an association of all 13 liberal state parties in the three Western zones of occupation. (Note: These regionally organised liberal parties were the Bremian Democratic People's Party (BDV) in the state of Bremen, the Democratic Party of Southern and Middle Baden (DemP) in the State of South Baden, the Democratic Party (DP) in the State of Rhineland-Palatinate, the Democratic People's Party of Northern Württemberg-Northern Baden (DVP) in the State of Württemberg-Baden, the Democratic People's Party of Southern Württemberg-Hohenzollern (DVP) in the State of Württemberg-Hohenzollern, the united Free Democratic Party (F.D.P.) of the British zone of occupation (consisting of five state associations), the Free Democratic Party (F.D.P.) in the Free State of Bavaria, the Liberal Democratic Party (LDP) in the State of Hesse, and the Liberal Democratic Party (LDP) of West Berlin. Cf. Almut Leh and Alexander von Plato, Ein unglaublicher Frühling: erfahrene Geschichte im Nachkriegsdeutschland 1945–1948, Bundeszentrale für Politische Bildung (ed.), Bonn: Bundeszentrale für Politische Bildung, 1997, p. 77. ISBN 3-89331-298-6) As such, the party included former members of the pre-1933 German People's Party (DVP) which represented the more conservative and national tradition of German liberalism and members from the social liberal German Democratic Party (DDP). The proposed name, Liberal Democratic Party, was rejected by the delegates, who voted 64 to 25 in favour of the name Free Democratic Party (FDP).

The party's first chairman was Theodor Heuss, a member of the Democratic People's Party in Württemberg-Baden; his deputy was Franz Blücher of the FDP in the British Zone. The place for the party's foundation was chosen deliberately: the "Heppenheim Assembly" was held at the Hotel Halber Mond on 10 October 1847, a meeting of moderate liberals who were preparing for what would be, within a few months, the German revolutions of 1848–1849.

=== 1949–1969: reconstruction of Germany ===
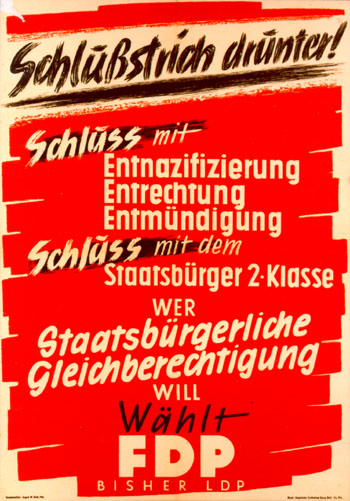
"Schlußstrich drunter!"—FDP election campaign poster reading "Draw a line under it" before the 1949 Bundestag election in Hesse calling for a halt to "denazification, disenfranchisement, disempowerment, second class citizenship" and for "equality of civil rights"

In the first elections to the Bundestag on 14 August 1949, the FDP won a vote share of 11.9 percent (with 12 direct mandates, particularly in Baden-Württemberg and Hesse), and thus obtained 52 of 402 seats. In September of the same year the FDP chairman Theodor Heuss was elected the first President of the Federal Republic of Germany. In his 1954 re-election, he received the best election result to date of a President with 871 of 1018 votes (85.6 percent) of the Federal Assembly. Adenauer was also elected on the proposal of the new German President with an extremely narrow majority as the first Chancellor. The FDP participated with the CDU/CSU and the national-conservative German Party (DP) in Adenauer's coalition cabinet; they had three ministers: Franz Blücher (Vice-Chancellor), Thomas Dehler (justice), and Eberhard Wildermuth (housing).

On the most important economic, social and German national issues, the FDP agreed with their coalition partners, the CDU/CSU. However, the FDP offered to middle-class voters a secular party that refused the religious schools and accused the opposition parties of clericalization. The FDP said they were known also as a consistent representative of the market economy, while the CDU was then dominated nominally from the Ahlen Programme, which allowed a Third Way between capitalism and socialism. Ludwig Erhard, the father of the social market economy, had his followers in the early years of the Federal Republic in the CDU/CSU rather than in the FDP. The FDP won Hesse's 1950 state election with 31.8 percent of the vote, the best result in its history, through appealing to East Germans displaced by the war by including them on their ticket.

Up to the 1950s, several of the FDP's regional organizations were to the right of the CDU/CSU, particularly the Hesse, Lower Saxony, and North Rhine-Westphalia branches where Friedrich Middelhauve tried to foster a National Rally as a third bloc next to Social Democrats and Christian Democrats. This was criticized by the social liberals around Theodor Heuss who distanced himself from the "Nazi FDP" branches. Under the influence of the party's right wing, the Free Democrats campaigned against West Germany's denazification provisions and courted even former office-holders of the Third Reich with nationalist values. At their party conference in Munich in 1951, they demanded the release of all "so-called war criminals" and welcomed the establishment of the "Association of German soldiers" of former Wehrmacht and SS members to advance the integration of the Nazi forces in democracy. These FDP members were seen as part of the far-right extremist bloc, along with the German Party in West Germany, by US intelligence officials. The 1953 Naumann Circle, named after Werner Naumann, consisted of a group of former Nazis who tried to infiltrate the party. After the British occupation authorities had arrested seven prominent members of the Naumann Circle, the FDP federal board installed a commission of inquiry, chaired by Thomas Dehler, which particularly sharply criticized the situation in the North Rhine-Westphalian FDP. In the following years, the right wing lost power, and the extreme right increasingly sought areas of activity outside the FDP. In the 1953 federal election, the FDP received 9.5 percent of the party votes, 10.8 percent of the primary vote (with 14 direct mandates, particularly in Hamburg, Lower Saxony, Hesse, Württemberg, and Bavaria) and 48 of 487 seats.

In the second term of the Bundestag, the South German Liberal Democrats gained influence in the party controlling the party leadership between 1954 and 1960. Thomas Dehler, a representative of a more social-liberal course from Bavaria took over as party and parliamentary leader. The former Minister of Justice Dehler, who in 1933 suffered persecution by the Nazis, was known for his populist rhetorics and tried to emancipate the party from Adenauer's CDU/CSU. In the mid-1950s, there were some disagreements between Dehler and Adenauer over foreign policy issues, particularly the founding of the European Defence Community and the Saar statute. The FDP took an emphatically nationalist stance on both issues. In 1956, the infights between Dehler and Adenauer culminated in a government crisis: The FDP in North Rhine-Westphalia terminated their alliance with the Christian Democrats and formed a new state government with the Social Democratic Party of Germany and the German Center Party which led to a party split. 16 members of parliament, including former party leader Franz Blücher and the four federal ministers from the FDP left their party and founded the short-lived Free People's Party (FVP). Whilst the FVP continued the government coalition with Adenauer's CDU/CSU and merged with the right-wing German Party in 1957, the FDP took it to the opposition for the first time in its history.

Only one of the smaller post-war parties, the FDP survived despite many problems. In the 1957 federal election they still reached 7.7 percent of the vote and held 41 of 497 seats in the Bundestag. However, they still remained in opposition because the Union won an absolute majority. At the federal party meeting in Berlin at the end of January 1957, Thomas Dehler was replaced as party chairman by another liberal democrat from South Germany, Reinhold Maier, who was able to stabilize his party before he made way for Erich Mende from North Rhine-Westphalia in 1960. With Mende as party leader the FDP went into the 1961 federal election with the promise of ending Konrad Adenauer's leadership and gained 12.8 percent nationwide, the best result until then. After the election, however, the FDP again formed a coalition with Adenauer's CDU on the condition that he would retire as chancellor after two years. These events led to the FDP being nicknamed the Umfallerpartei ("pushover party"). In the 1962 Spiegel affair, the FDP temporarily withdrew their ministers from the federal government forcing Defence Minister Franz-Josef Strauß to resign. In accordance with his agreement with the FDP, Adenauer resigned from his chancellorship in October 1963, making place for Ludwig Erhard who appointed FDP leader Erich Mende as Vice Chancellor and Minister of All-German Affairs.

In the 1965 federal election the FDP gained 9.5 percent. The Free Democrats initially renewed their alliance with the CDU under Erhard but the coalition broke up in 1966 on the issue of tax increases. During the 1966-1969 Grand coalition the party led the opposition. Under their new chairman, Walter Scheel, there were signs of a change both in foreign policy and in party strategy: For the first time, the FDP opened up to a coalition with the SPD on a federal level, embracing foreign minister Willy Brandt's Ostpolitik.

=== 1969–1982: social changes and crises ===
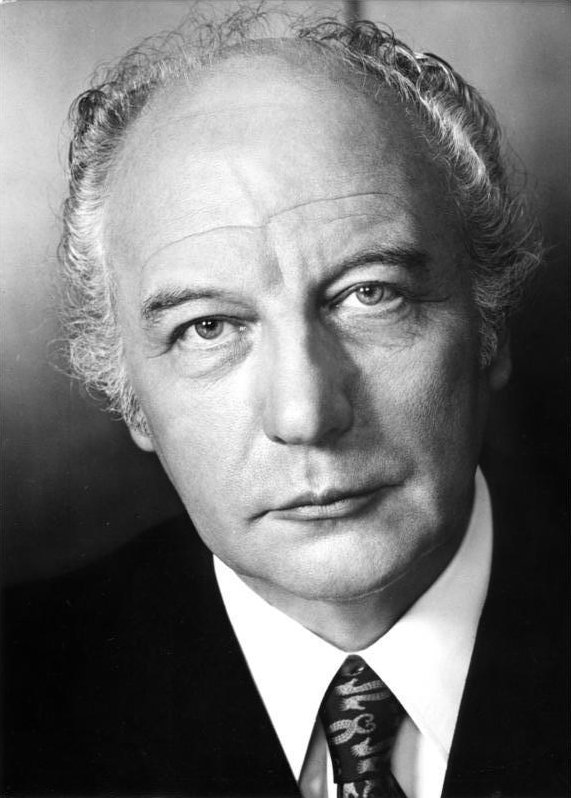
Walter Scheel served as Foreign Minister, Vice Chancellor, Acting Chancellor and President of Germany.

The 1969 West German federal election led to the first social-liberal coalition between Social Democrats and Free Democrats in German post-war history. Even though the Christian Democrats won the election, the Free Democrats rejected a new centre-right alliance and opted for a centre-left coalition under the new Chancellor Willy Brandt. With FDP leader Walter Scheel as Vice Chancellor and Foreign Minister, the liberals initiated a new controversial Ostpolitik effectively normalizing relations between capitalist-democratic West Germany and communist-led East Germany. Within the FDP, this policy was quite controversial, especially after the de facto recognition of the Oder-Neisse line by the 1970 Treaty of Warsaw.

In July 1970, right-wing members founded a "non-partisan" organization called the National-Liberal Action with the goal of breaking up the SPD/FDP coalition government. A little later, members of parliament Siegfried Zoglmann, Heinz Starke and former party leader Erich Mende left the party with Starke and Mende joining the CDU and Zoglmann founding a new splinter party called German Union (Deutsche Union). This led to the 1972 snap election from which the SPD/FDP government emerged even stronger. In 1974, party leader Walter Scheel was the second Liberal to be elected Federal President after Theodor Heuss. He was succeeded by Interior Minister Hans-Dietrich Genscher as the new FDP leader and Foreign Minister who continued the centre-left coalition under new SPD Chancellor Helmut Schmidt.

The party's centre-left strategy was supported by a new party manifesto, the 1971 Freiburg Theses (Freiburger Thesen) which set the party on a progressive and social liberal course. Among other things, the party committed itself to "self-determination", "democratization of society", a "reform of capitalism" and a form of ecoliberalism which prioritized "environmental protection over profit and personal gains". However, in 1977, the progressive liberal Freiburg Theses were supplemented and partially revised by the more economically liberal Kiel Theses (Kieler Thesen), effectively setting the party back on a classical liberal course.

Even prior to the 1980 West German federal election, cooperation between Social Democrats and Free Democrats seemed to come to an end but the candidacy of CSU chairman Franz Josef Strauss for chancellor led both parties to once again renew their coalition government.

=== 1982–1998: Kohl government, economic transition and reunification ===
In the fall of 1982, the FDP reneged on its coalition agreement with the SPD and instead threw its support behind the CDU/CSU. On 1 October, the FDP and CDU/CSU were able to oust Schmidt and replace him with CDU party chairman Helmut Kohl as the new Chancellor. The coalition change resulted in severe internal conflicts, and the FDP then lost about 20 percent of its 86,500 members, as reflected in the general election in 1983 by a drop from 10.6 percent to 7.0 percent. The members went mostly to the SPD, the Greens and newly formed splinter parties, such as the left-liberal party Liberal Democrats (LD). The exiting members included the former FDP General Secretary and later EU Commissioner Günter Verheugen.

At the party convention in November 1982, the Schleswig-Holstein state chairman Uwe Ronneburger challenged Hans-Dietrich Genscher as party chairman. Ronneburger received 186 of the votes—about 40 percent—and was just narrowly defeated by Genscher who went on to act as party chairman as well as Vice Chancellor and Foreign Minister in the new Kohl government. In the following federal election campaigns during the 1980s and 1990s, the party sided with the CDU and CSU, the main conservative parties in Germany.

in 1980, FDP members who did not agree with the politics of the left-leaning FDP youth organization Young Democrats founded the Young Liberals (JuLis). For a time JuLis and the Young Democrats operated side by side, until the JuLis became the sole official youth wing of the FDP in 1983. The Young Democrats split from the FDP and were left as a party-independent youth organization ultimately merging with a marxist youth group to form the "Young Democrats/Young Left" in 1992.

During the "Peaceful Revolution" of 1989 in the GDR, a couple of new liberal parties emerged from the opposition, like the Free Democratic Party (East Germany) or the German Forum Party. Prior to the March 1990 Volkskammer election they joined the established Liberal Democratic Party, who had previously acted as a pro-communist bloc party on the side of the SED, to form the Alliance of Free Democrats (BFD). In the Volkskammer election of March 1990 the Association of Free Democrats was heavily supported by the West German FDP and polled 5.28% of the votes. Most of the seats went to Liberal Democratic Party members, whose leader Rainer Ortleb became their parliamentary leader. It then participated in the last GDR government led by Lothar de Maizière. After the Liberal Democratic Party and another former bloc party, the National Democratic Party of Germany, merged into the new party Association of Free Democrats in late March, the several liberal parties all united with the West German FDP in August 1990 to form the first all-German party. The merger brought the Free Democrats a great, albeit short-lived, increase in membership and assets of DM 6.3 million in cash and property.

At the time of reunification, the FDP's objective was a special economic zone in the former East Germany, but the party could not prevail against the CDU/CSU. In the first all-German Bundestag election, the centre-right Kohl coalition was confirmed, the FDP received 11.0 percent of the valid votes (79 seats) and won in Genscher's city of birth Halle (Saale) the first direct mandate since 1957. During the 1990s, the FDP won between 6.2 and 11 percent of the vote in Bundestag elections.

In the second half of the 1990s, however, the FDP had to contend with a series of electoral defeats at local and state level, which led to it falling out of twelve of the 16 state parliaments and the European Parliament between 1993 and 1995. The party was derisively referred to as the 'lady without an abdomen'. At the same time, the party was shaken by new infights between the left and right wings. In 1996, Federal Minister of Justice Sabine Leutheusser-Schnarrenberger, a prominent representative of the party's social liberal wing, resigned in protest to the government's policy of expanding the state's right to interfere in citizens' private domain by means of acoustic observation (Großer Lauschangriff, literally "big eavesdropping attack"). On the other hand, former Public Prosecutor General Alexander von Stahl tried to rebuild the party's national liberal wing in an ultimately failed attempt to bring the FDP onto a right-wing course modelled on Jörg Haider's FPÖ in Austria.

These infights contributed to the CDU/CSU-FDP defeat in the 1998 German federal election which ended the 16-year centre-right coalition in Germany and the FDP's nearly three decade reign in government. For the first time since 1969 (apart from a brief period in 1982), the Free Democrats now found themselves in opposition and out of power on a federal level.

=== 2002 and 2005 federal elections ===
Following their electoral defeat, the party developed a strategy of equidistance to the CDU and SPD championed by North Rhine-Westfalia state party leader Jürgen Möllemann who led the party to a good result in the 2000 state election. At their 2001 party conference in Düsseldorf, outgoing party leader Wolfgang Gerhardt was replaced by a 39 year old Guido Westerwelle who became the youngest FDP leader in history. The party conference also adopted a strategy developed by Möllemann which became known as 'Project 18'. It aimed at winning new groups of voters through new forms of communication and presentation and at profiling the party as an independent force autonomous from SPD and CDU. The name referred to the electoral goal of tripling the party's share of the vote from 6% to 18%. While Westerwelle and Möllemann generated a lot of media attention, the party was once again embroiled in controversy on Westerwelle's perceived lack of seriousness in his election campaign ("Spaßwahlkampf") and on Möllemann's alleged right-wing populism. Many critics interpreted the use of the number 18 as a hidden right-wing extremist symbol (a code for the letters A and H, meaning Adolf Hitler) and an attempt to attract voters on the far right. In addition, Möllemann launched a leaflet campaign with harsh criticism of the Israeli government under Ariel Sharon and the German-Jewish journalist Michel Friedman, which critics interpreted as anti-Semitism. Amid controversy over a possible right-wing populist orientation associated with this, the FDP ultimately achieved 7.4% instead of the targeted 18 per cent in the 2002 German federal election.

Former logo (2001–2014)

In the 2005 general election the party won 9.8 percent of the vote and 61 federal deputies, an unpredicted improvement from prior opinion polls. It is believed that this was partly due to tactical voting by CDU and Christian Social Union of Bavaria (CSU) alliance supporters who hoped for stronger market-oriented economic reforms than the CDU/CSU alliance called for. However, because the CDU did worse than predicted, the FDP and the CDU/CSU alliance were unable to form a coalition government. At other times, for example after the 2002 federal election, a coalition between the FDP and CDU/CSU was impossible primarily because of the weak results of the FDP.

The CDU/CSU parties had achieved the third-worst performance in German postwar history with only 35.2 percent of the votes. Therefore, the FDP was unable to form a coalition with its preferred partners, the CDU/CSU parties. As a result, the party was considered as a potential member of two other political coalitions, following the election. One possibility was a partnership between the FDP, the Social Democratic Party of Germany (SPD) and the Alliance 90/The Greens, known as a "traffic light coalition", named after the colors of the three parties. This coalition was ruled out, because the FDP considered the Social Democrats and the Greens insufficiently committed to market-oriented economic reform. The other possibility was a CDU-FDP-Green coalition, known as a "Jamaica coalition" because of the colours of the three parties. This coalition wasn't concluded either, since the Greens ruled out participation in any coalition with the CDU/CSU. Instead, the CDU formed a Grand coalition with the SPD, and the FDP entered the opposition. FDP leader Guido Westerwelle became the unofficial leader of the opposition by virtue of the FDP's position as the largest opposition party in the Bundestag.

In the 2009 European election, the FDP received 11% of the national vote (2,888,084 votes in total) and returned 12 MEPs.

=== 2009–2013: Merkel II government ===
In the September 2009 federal election, the FDP increased its share of the vote by 4.8 percentage points to 14.6%, an all-time record. This percentage was enough to offset a decline in the CDU/CSU's vote compared to 2005, to create a CDU-FDP centre-right governing coalition in the Bundestag with a 53% majority of seats. On election night, party leader Westerwelle said his party would work to ensure that civil liberties were respected and that Germany got an "equitable tax system and better education opportunities".

The party also made gains in the two state elections held at the same time, acquiring sufficient seats for a CDU-FDP coalition in the northernmost state, Schleswig-Holstein, and gaining enough votes in left-leaning Brandenburg to clear the 5% hurdle to enter that state's parliament.

However, after reaching its best ever election result in 2009, the FDP's support collapsed. The party's policy pledges were put on hold by Merkel as the Great Recession unfolded and with the onset of the Euro area crisis. By the end of 2010, the party's support had dropped to as low as 5%. The FDP retained their seats in the state elections in North Rhine-Westphalia, which was held six months after the federal election, but out of the seven state elections that have been held since 2009, the FDP lost all their seats in five of them due to failing to cross the 5% threshold.

Support for the party further eroded amid infighting and an internal rebellion over euro-area bailouts during the Euro area crisis.

Westerwelle stepped down as party leader following the 2011 state elections, in which the party was wiped out in Saxony-Anhalt and Rhineland-Palatinate and lost half its seats in Baden-Württemberg. Westerwelle was replaced in May 2011 by Philipp Rösler. Rösler was the first cabinet minister and vice-chancellor of Asian background in Germany. Rösler was the first cabinet minister and vice-chancellor of Asian background in Germany. The change in leadership failed to revive the FDP's fortunes, however, and in the next series of state elections, the party lost all its seats in Bremen, Mecklenburg-Vorpommern, and Berlin. In Berlin, the party lost nearly 75% of the support they had had in the previous election.

In March 2012, the FDP lost all their state-level representation in the 2012 Saarland state election. However, this was offset by the Schleswig-Holstein state elections, when they achieved 8% of the vote, which was a severe loss of seats but still over the 5% threshold. In the snap elections in North Rhine-Westphalia a week later, the FDP not only crossed the electoral threshold, but also increased its share of the votes to 2 percentage points higher than in the previous state election. This was attributed to the local leadership of Christian Lindner.

=== 2013 federal election ===
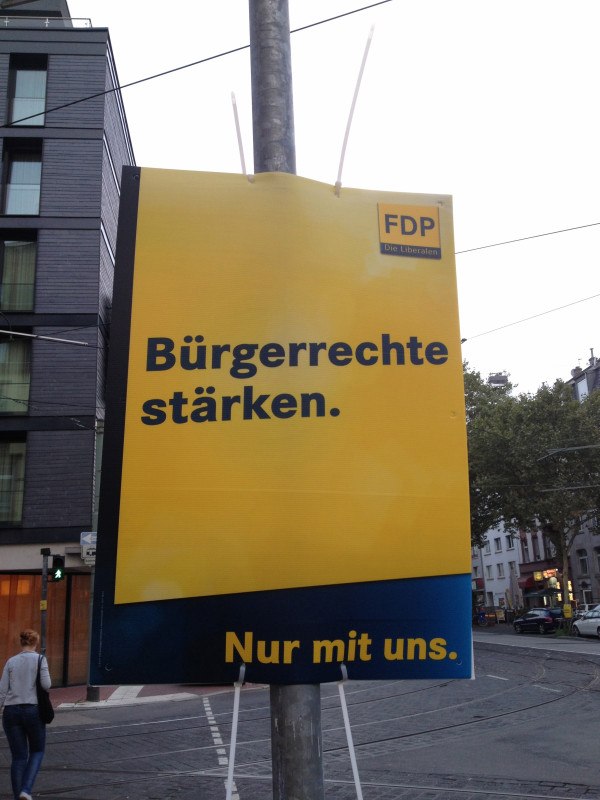
FDP election poster for the 2013 federal election

The FDP last won a directly elected seat in 1990, in Halle—the only time it has won a directly elected seat since 1957. The party's inability to win directly elected seats came back to haunt it at the 2013 election, in which it came up just short of the 5% threshold. With no directly elected seats, the FDP was shut out of the Bundestag for the first time since 1949. After the previous chairman Philipp Rösler then resigned, Christian Lindner took over the leadership of the party.

=== 2014 European and state elections ===
In the 2014 European parliament election, the FDP received 3.4% of the national vote (986,253 votes in total) and returned 3 MEPs. In the 2014 Brandenburg state election the party experienced a 5.8% down-swing and lost all their representatives in the Brandenburg state parliament. In the 2014 Saxony state election, the party experienced a 5.2% down-swing, again losing all of its seats. In the 2014 Thuringian state election a similar phenomenon was repeated with the party falling below the 5% threshold following a 5.1% drop in popular vote.

=== 2015–2020 ===
Former logo (2014–2026)

The party managed to enter parliament in the 2015 Bremen state election with the party receiving 6.5% of the vote and gaining 6 seats. However, it failed to get into government as a coalition between the Social Democrats and the Greens was created. In the 2016 Mecklenburg-Vorpommern state election the party failed to get into parliament despite increasing its vote share by 0.3%. The party did manage to get into parliament in Baden-Württemberg, gaining 3% of the vote and a total of 12 seats. This represents a five-seat improvement over their previous results. In the 2016 Berlin state election the party gained 4.9% of the vote and 12 seats but still failed to get into government. A red-red-green coalition was instead formed relegating the FDP to the opposition. In the 2016 Rhineland-Palatinate state election, the party managed to enter parliament receiving 6.2% of the vote and 7 seats. It also managed to enter government under a traffic light coalition. In 2016 Saxony-Anhalt state election the party narrowly missed the 5% threshold, receiving 4.9% of the vote and therefore receiving zero seats despite a 1% swing in their favour.

The 2017 North Rhine-Westphalia state election was widely considered a test of the party's future as their chairman Christian Lindner was also leading the party in that state. The party experienced a 4% swing in its favour gaining 6 seats and entering into a coalition with the CDU with a bare majority. In the 2017 Saarland state election the party again failed to gain any seats despite a 1% swing in their favour. The party gained 3 seats and increased its vote share by 3.2% in the 2017 Schleswig-Holstein state election. This success was often credited to their state chairman Wolfgang Kubicki. They also managed to re-enter the government under a Jamaica coalition.

In the 2017 federal election the party scored 10.7% of votes and re-entered the Bundestag, winning 80 seats. After the election, a Jamaica coalition was considered between the CDU, Greens, and FDP. However, FDP chief Christian Lindner walked out of the coalition talks due to a disagreement over European migration policy, saying "It is better not to govern than to govern badly." As a result, the CDU/CSU formed another grand coalition with the SPD.

The FDP won 5.4% and 5 seats in the 2019 European election.

In the October 2019 Thuringian state election, the FDP won seats in the Landtag of Thuringia for the first time since 2009. It exceeded the 5% threshold by just 5 votes. In February 2020, the FDP's Thomas Kemmerich was elected Minister-President of Thuringia by the Landtag with the likely support of the CDU and AfD, becoming the second member of the FDP to serve as head of government in a German state. This was also the first time a head of government had been elected with the support of AfD. Under intense pressure from state and federal politicians, Kemmerich resigned the following day, stating he would seek new elections. The next month, he was replaced by Bodo Ramelow of The Left; the FDP did not run a candidate in the second vote for Minister-President.

=== 2021–present ===
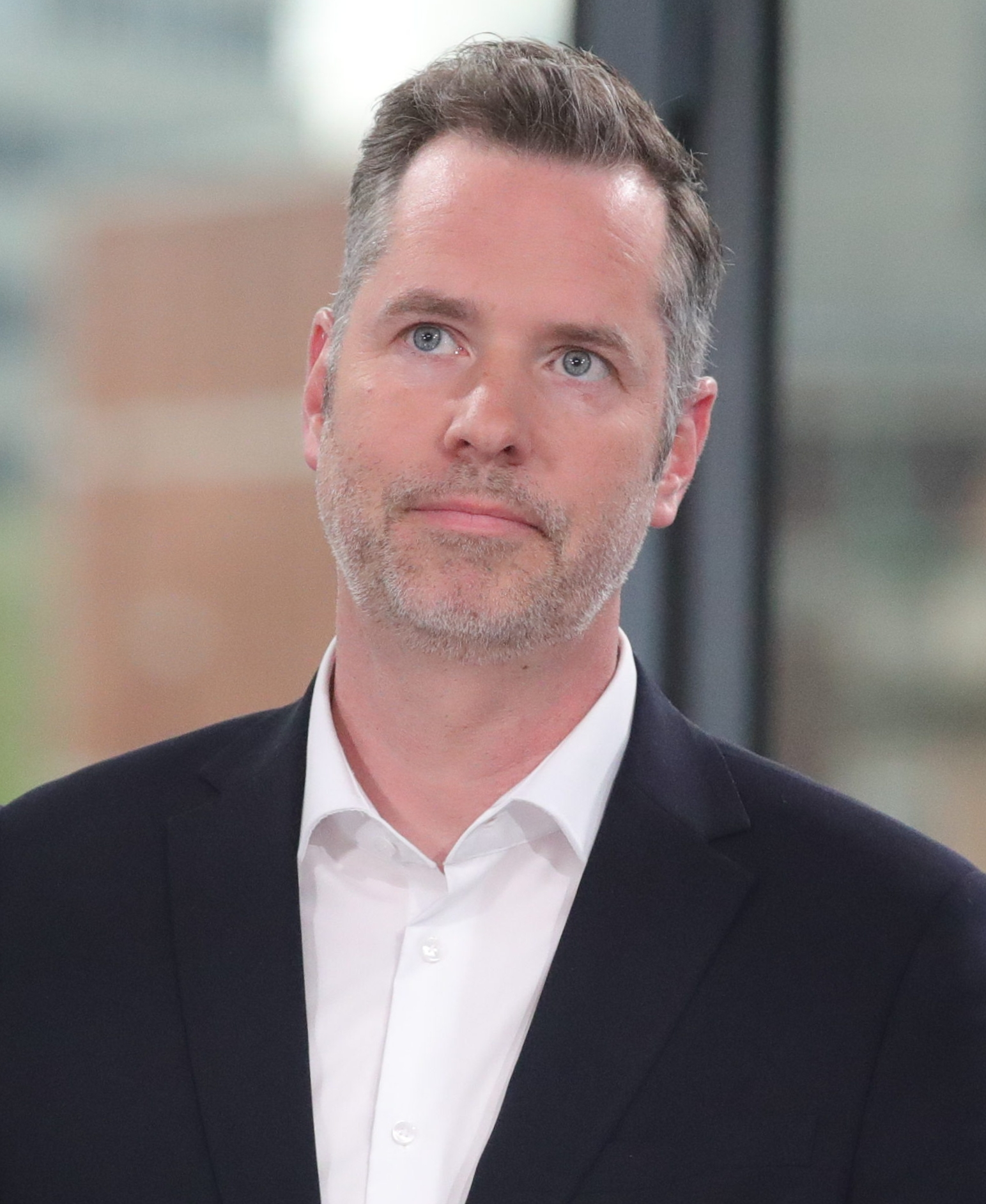
Christian Dürr is the party chairman, having succeeded Christian Lindner in May 2025.

In 2021, the FDP returned to the Saxony-Anhalt state parliament after five years of absence. They had similar success in Baden-Württemberg and Mecklenburg-Vorpommern, but faced setbacks in Baden-Württemberg, Berlin and Rhineland-Palatinate.

In the September 2021 federal election, the CDU/CSU under Armin Laschet was defeated. The FDP saw both its vote share and number of seats grow, to 11.5% and 92 seats respectively. As a result, the SPD, Greens, and FDP entered talks to form an Ampelkoalition (traffic light coalition). In the agreement finalized on 24 November, the FDP held four federal ministries in the Scholz cabinet (Finance, Justice, Digital and Transport and Education and Research).

After the comeback in the Federal Government, the FDP saw poor approval in national opinion polls, and started falling out of multiple state parliaments. In March 2022, the FDP didn't win any seats in Saarland. Then in October it lost all 11 of their seats in Lower Saxony. It also lost all 12 seats in the 2023 Berlin repeat state election, and in May they lost over half their seats in North Rhine-Westphalia and Schleswig-Holstein. In the 2023 Bavarian state election, where Martin Hagen led the party, it lost all 11 seats. The FDP were similarly wiped out in the 2024 Thuringian state election, where Thomas Kemmerich lost his party's 5 seats, again in the 2024 Saxony state election, where the FDP achieved less than 1% of the vote, and lastly in the 2025 Hamburg state election, where the party lost its last constituency seat, making a total of six states where the party was wiped out since 2021.

In the 2024 European Parliament election the party kept on 5 seats, coming in sixth, behind the newly formed BSW.

In November 2024, Christian Lindner was fired as Minister of Finance. The FDP leaving the coalition meant the collapse of the traffic light government. With the crisis taking place the four ministries held by the party were lost, as Marco Buschmann and Bettina Stark-Watzinger resigned. However, Digital and Transport minister Volker Wissing decided to resign from the FDP instead in order to stay in cabinet. On the same month controversy was sparked after Die Zeit and Süddeutsche Zeitung reported that the crisis was in fact a deliberate strategy by the FDP, planned for weeks in advance, in a paper with heavy use of militaristic terminology, including the word D-Day, a reference to the allied invasion of Normandy during WWII. The reports contradicted declarations by the party leader Lindner on Scholz's "calculated break" of the governing coalition.

In the subsequent snap election, FDP failed to reach the 5% threshold needed for parliamentary representation and as a result lost all their seats in Bundestag again. Christian Lindner and Wolfgang Kubicki would resign from party leadership.

In March 2026 the FDP failed to reach the 5% threshold in both the 2026 Baden-Württemberg and Rhineland-Palatinate state elections and as a result they lost all of their seats in both state parliaments. On 23 March 2026, there were reports that Christian Dürr along with the rest of the party leadership would resign from their positions ahead of the party congress scheduled for May. Wolfgang Kubicki was elected party leader on 30 May 2026 during the party congress, defeating Marie-Agnes Strack Zimmerman. During the 2026 Saxony-Anhalt state election on 6 September 2026, the FDP lost all seven of their seats in the Landtag of Saxony-Anhalt, after failing to reach the 5% threshold. The party also lost all three of its seats in the Landtag of Mecklenburg-Vorpommern, and failed to enter the Berlin House of Representatives.

== Ideology and platform ==
Membership development showing the spike around 1990 due to East German LDPD and NDPD fusing with the (West German) FDP

The FDP's political position has variously been described as centrist, centre-right, and right-wing. The FDP has been described as liberal, conservative liberal, classical liberal, and liberal conservative. Others have described the party as fiscally conservative, libertarian, or right-libertarian.

The FDP is a predominantly classical-liberal inspired party, both in the sense of supporting free market economic policies and in the sense of policies emphasizing the minimization of government interference in individual affairs. During election campaigning, the party has emphasised support for tax cuts, reductions in government spending and balanced budgets. The party has also been described by various media sources as neoliberal. Scholars of political science have historically identified the FDP as closer to the CDU/CSU bloc than to the Social Democratic Party of Germany (SPD) on economic issues but closer to the SPD and the Greens on issues such as civil liberties, education, defense, and foreign policy. The FDP has oriented itself towards a centrist position between the CDU and the SPD; however, it is to the right of the CDU in its socioeconomics perspective, environmental and labour policies.

The party is a traditional supporter of ordoliberalism, having been influenced by the economic theories of Wilhelm Röpke and Alexander Rüstow. Otto Graf Lambsdorff, who served as Federal Minister of Economics, is a historical FDP grandee who was a proponent of ordoliberalism. In 1971 during its federal social-liberal coalition with the SPD, the FDP published the Freiburger Thesis programme, heralding an ideological move towards reformism and social liberalism, and support for environmental protection. However, the party's 1977 Kiel Theses and 1985 Liberal Manifesto returned the FDP towards its traditional free-market, ordoliberal approach. Historical members of the party's social-liberal wing included Gerhart Baum and Werner Maihofer, a faction who remained organised as the Freiberg Circle. Alternatively to the liberal-orientated wings of the party are a conservative or national-conservative wing, influenced by the populist and nationalist developments of the Freedom Party of Austria and the New Right. The FDP's national-conservative wing has included individuals such as Rainer Zitelmann, Klaus Rainer Röhl, Alexander von Stahl, and Jürgen Möllemann, and was organised as the Liberal Offensive. Möllemann in particular was noted for his role during the 2002 federal election in attempting to push the party in a right-wing populist direction, albeit ultimately with poor electoral results.

During the 2017 federal election, the party called for Germany to adopt an immigration channel using a Canada-style points-based immigration system; spend up to 3% of GDP on defense and international security; phase out the solidarity surcharge tax (which was first levied in 1991 to pay for the costs of absorbing East Germany after German reunification); cut taxes by 30 billion euro (twice the amount of the tax cut proposed by the CDU); and improve road infrastructure by spending 2 billion euro annually for each of the next two decades, to be funded by selling government stakes in Deutsche Bahn, Deutsche Telekom, and Deutsche Post. The FDP also called for the improvement of Germany's digital infrastructure, the establishment of a Ministry of Digital Affairs, and greater investment in education.

The party supports replacement migration in response to the decline and aging of Germany's population. In 2020, Christian Dürr said that Germany should accept 500,000 immigrants per year. The party also supports allowing dual citizenship (in contrast to the CDU/CSU, which opposes it) but also supports requiring third-generation immigrants to select a single nationality.

The FDP supports the legalization of cannabis in Germany, and opposes proposals to heighten Internet surveillance. The FDP supports same-sex marriage in Germany. The FDP supports legalisation of altruistic surrogacy. The FDP has mixed views on European integration. In its 2009 campaign manifesto, the FDP pledged support for ratification of the Lisbon Treaty as well as EU reforms aimed at enhancing transparency and democratic responsiveness, reducing bureaucracy, establishing stringent curbs on the EU budget, and fully liberalizing the Single Market. At its January 2019 congress ahead of the 2019 European Parliament election, FDP's manifesto called for further EU reforms, including reducing the number of European Commissioners to 18 from the current 28, abolishing the European Economic and Social Committee, and ending the European Parliament's "traveling circus" between Brussels and Strasbourg. Vice chairwoman and Deputy Leader Nicola Beer stated: "We want both more and less Europe."

Under Wolfgang Kubicki's leadership, the FDP has been noted as taking a more right-leaning tone, with Kubicki coming out against the firewall against the AfD, and the election of a new Secretary-General Marten Hagen, who is the CEO of the Republik 21 thinktank which has written in favour of bourgeois politics and against woke identity politics, cancel culture, and ever-increasing welfare.

== Electorate ==
FDP support in the 2024 European Parliament election in Germany

In 1940s and 1950s, the FDP was the only German party strongly in favour of market economy, while the CDU/CSU was still adhering to a "third way" between capitalism and socialism. Initially founded as a party uniting liberals and nationalists, the early FDP wanted former Nazis to be reintegrated into society and demanded a release of Nazi war criminals.

The party's membership has historically been largely male; in 1995, less than one-third of the party's members were women, and in the 1980s women made up less than one-tenth of the party's national executive committee. By the 1990s, the percentage of women on the FDP's national executive committee rose to 20%.

The party tends to draw its support from professionals and self-employed Germans. It lacks consistent support from a voting bloc, such as the trade union membership that supports the SPD or the church membership that supports the CDU/CSU, and thus has historically only garnered a small group of Stammwähler (core voters) who consistently vote for the party.

In the 2021 elections, the FDP was the second-most popular party among voters under age 30; among this demographic, the Greens won 22% of the vote, the FDP 19%, the SPD 17%, the CDU/CSU 11%, Die Linke 8%, and the AfD 8%. According to Deutsche Welle in 2021, voters for both the FDP and the Greens are similar in being younger, politically centrist professionals living in cities, unlike left working-class voters and right Christian voters.

== European representation ==
In the European Parliament the Free Democratic Party sits in the Renew Europe group with five MEPs.

== Election results ==
=== Federal parliament (Bundestag) ===
Below are charts of the results that the FDP has secured in each election to the federal Bundestag. Timelines showing the number of seats and percentage of party list votes won are on the right.

| Election | Leader | Constituency | | Party list | | Seats | +/– | Status |
| Election | Leader | Votes | % | Votes | % | Seats | +/– | Status |
|---|---|---|---|---|---|---|---|---|
| 1949 | Franz Blücher | | | 2,829,920 | 11.9 (#3) | 52 / 410 | | CDU/CSU–FDP–DP |
| 1953 | Franz Blücher | 2,967,566 | 10.8 (#3) | 2,629,163 | 9.5 (#3) | 53 / 509 | ▲1 | CDU/CSU–FDP–DP |
| 1957 | Reinhold Maier | 2,276,234 | 7.5 (#4) | 2,307,135 | 7.7 (#4) | 43 / 519 | ▼10 | Opposition |
| 1961 | Erich Mende | 3,866,269 | 12.1 (#3) | 4,028,766 | 12.8 (#3) | 67 / 521 | ▲24 | CDU/CSU–FDP |
| 1965 | Erich Mende | 2,562,294 | 7.9 (#4) | 3,096,739 | 9.5 (#4) | 50 / 518 | ▼17 | CDU/CSU–FDP (1965–66) |
| 1965 | Erich Mende | 2,562,294 | 7.9 (#4) | 3,096,739 | 9.5 (#4) | 50 / 518 | ▼17 | Opposition (1966–69) |
| 1969 | Walter Scheel | 1,554,651 | 4.8 (#4) | 1,903,422 | 5.8 (#4) | 31 / 518 | ▼19 | SPD–FDP |
| 1972 | Walter Scheel | 1,790,513 | 4.8 (#4) | 3,129,982 | 8.4 (#4) | 42 / 518 | ▲11 | SPD–FDP |
| 1976 | Hans-Dietrich Genscher | 2,417,683 | 6.4 (#4) | 2,995,085 | 7.9 (#4) | 40 / 518 | ▼2 | SPD–FDP |
| 1980 | Hans-Dietrich Genscher | 2,720,480 | 7.2 (#4) | 4,030,999 | 10.6 (#3) | 54 / 519 | ▲14 | SPD–FDP (1980–82) |
| 1980 | Hans-Dietrich Genscher | 2,720,480 | 7.2 (#4) | 4,030,999 | 10.6 (#3) | 54 / 519 | ▲14 | CDU/CSU–FDP (1982–83) |
| 1983 | Hans-Dietrich Genscher | 1,087,918 | 2.8 (#5) | 2,706,942 | 6.9 (#4) | 35 / 520 | ▼19 | CDU/CSU–FDP |
| 1987 | Martin Bangemann | 1,760,496 | 4.7 (#5) | 3,440,911 | 9.1 (#4) | 48 / 519 | ▲13 | CDU/CSU–FDP |
| 1990 | Otto Graf Lambsdorff | 3,595,135 | 7.8 (#3) | 5,123,233 | 11.0 (#3) | 79 / 662 | ▲31 | CDU/CSU–FDP |
| 1994 | Klaus Kinkel | 1,558,185 | 3.3 (#6) | 3,258,407 | 6.9 (#5) | 47 / 672 | ▼32 | CDU/CSU–FDP |
| 1998 | Wolfgang Gerhardt | 1,486,433 | 3.0 (#6) | 3,080,955 | 6.2 (#5) | 43 / 669 | ▼4 | Opposition |
| 2002 | Guido Westerwelle | 2,752,796 | 5.8 (#4) | 3,538,815 | 7.4 (#5) | 47 / 603 | ▲4 | Opposition |
| 2005 | Guido Westerwelle | 2,208,531 | 4.7 (#6) | 4,648,144 | 9.8 (#3) | 61 / 614 | ▲14 | Opposition |
| 2009 | Guido Westerwelle | 4,076,496 | 9.4 (#4) | 6,316,080 | 14.6 (#3) | 93 / 622 | ▲32 | CDU/CSU–FDP |
| 2013 | Rainer Brüderle | 1,028,645 | 2.4 (#6) | 2,083,533 | 4.8 (#6) | 0 / 631 | ▼93 | No seats |
| 2017 | Christian Lindner | 3,249,238 | 7.0 (#7) | 4,997,178 | 10.7 (#4) | 80 / 709 | ▲80 | Opposition |
| 2021 | Christian Lindner | 4,040,783 | 8.7 (#5) | 5,316,698 | 11.4 (#4) | 91 / 735 | ▲11 | SPD–Greens–FDP (2021–24) |
| 2021 | Christian Lindner | 4,040,783 | 8.7 (#5) | 5,316,698 | 11.4 (#4) | 91 / 735 | ▲11 | Opposition (2024–25) |
| 2025 | Christian Lindner | 1,623,351 | 3.3 (#7) | 2,148,878 | 4.3 (#7) | 0 / 630 | ▼91 | No seats |

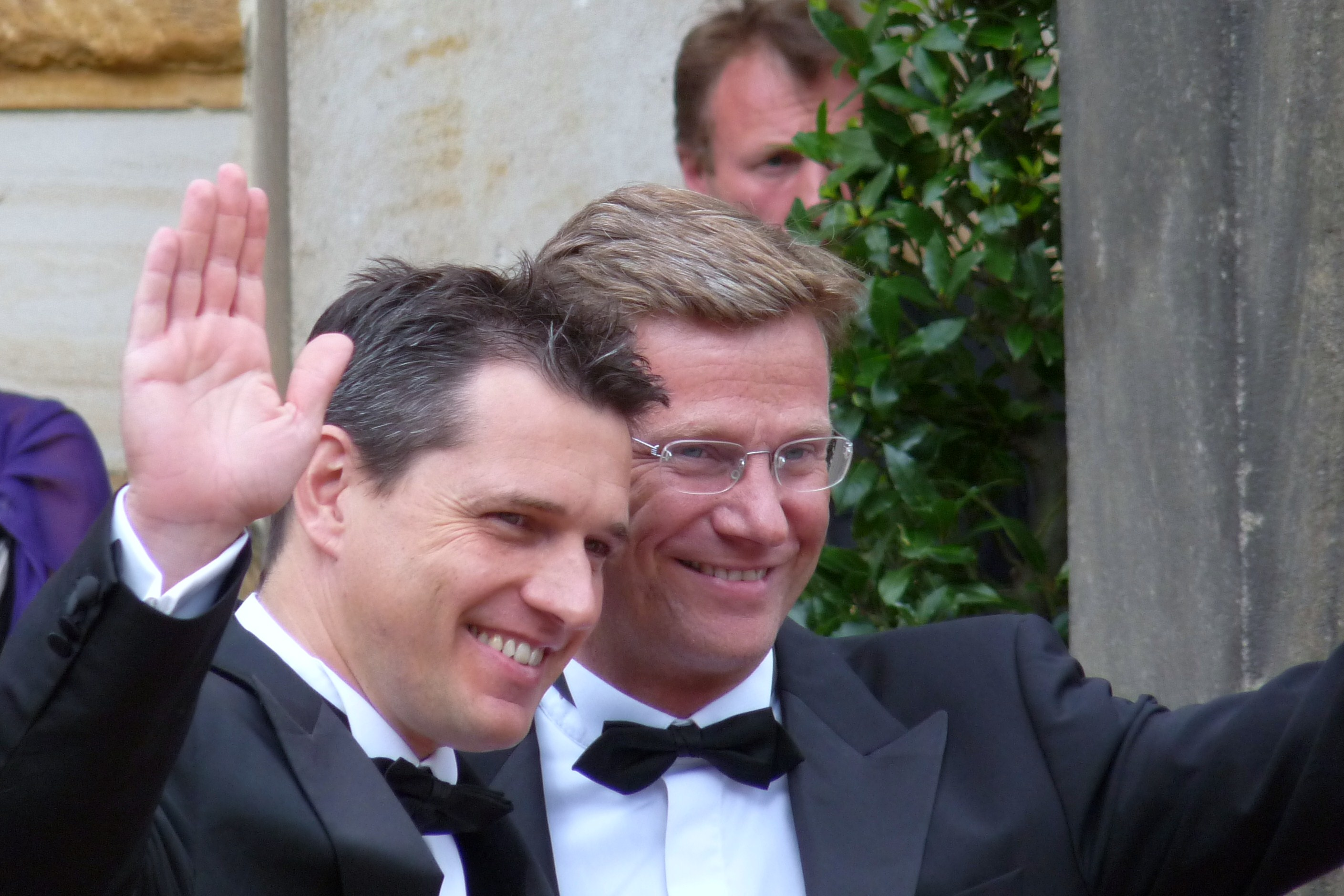
Guido Westerwelle (right) and his partner Michael Mronz in 2009

=== European Parliament ===
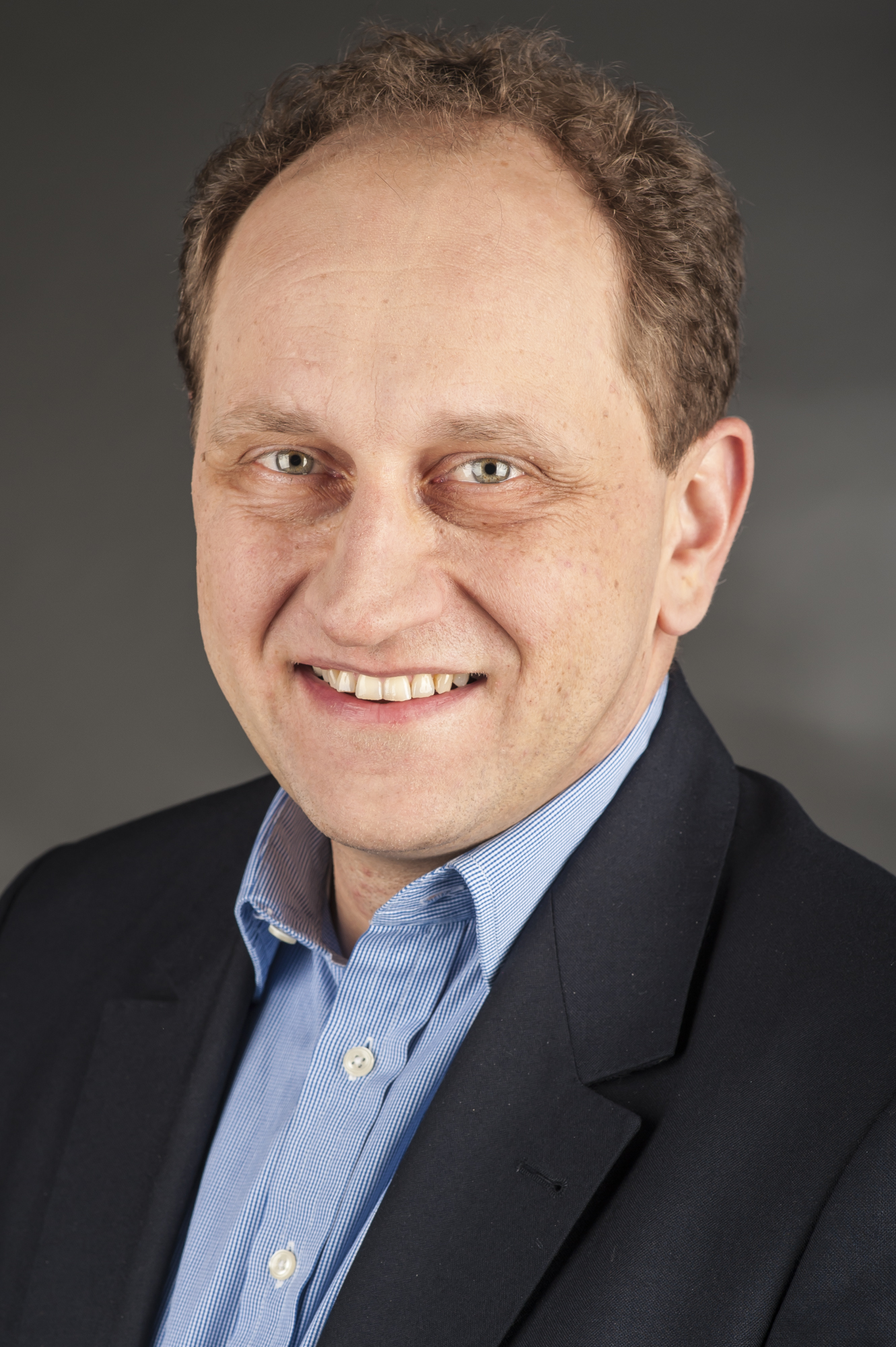
Alexander Graf Lambsdorff, Vice President of the European Parliament (2014–2019)

| Election | Votes | % | Seats | +/– | EP Group |
|---|---|---|---|---|---|
| 1979 | 1,662,621 | 5.97 (#4) | 4 / 81 | New | LD |
| 1984 | 1,192,624 | 4.80 (#5) | 0 / 81 | ▼4 | – |
| 1989 | 1,576,715 | 5.59 (#6) | 4 / 81 | ▲4 | LDR |
| 1994 | 1,442,857 | 4.07 (#6) | 0 / 99 | ▼4 | – |
| 1999 | 820,371 | 3.03 (#6) | 0 / 99 | 0 | – |
| 2004 | 1,565,431 | 6.07 (#6) | 7 / 99 | ▲7 | ALDE |
| 2009 | 2,888,084 | 10.97 (#4) | 12 / 99 | ▲5 | ALDE |
| 2014 | 986,253 | 3.36 (#7) | 3 / 96 | ▼9 | ALDE |
| 2019 | 2,028,353 | 5.42 (#7) | 5 / 96 | ▲2 | RE |
| 2024 | 2,060,457 | 5.18 (#7) | 5 / 96 | 0 | RE |

=== State parliaments (Länder) ===
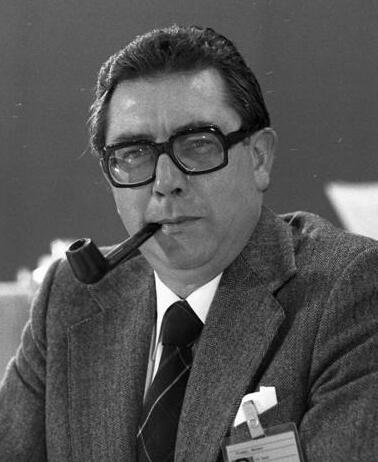
Werner Klumpp, interim Minister-President of the Saarland from 26 June 1979 to 5 July 1979

Votes equal to amount of "Zweitstimme", 2nd vote, the popular vote for the party lists that determine proportions and number of seats of a party. "Erststimme", first vote, only determines which party candidates will win the seats. The votes can not be added.

| State parliament | Election | Votes | % | Seats | +/– | Status |
|---|---|---|---|---|---|---|
| Baden-Württemberg | 2026 | 235,561 | 4.4 (#6) | 0 / 158 | ▼18 | No seats |
| Bremen | 2023 | 64,155 | 5.1 (#6) | 5 / 84 | 0 | Opposition |
| Bavaria | 2023 | 208.210 | 3.0 (#6) | 0 / 205 | ▼11 | No seats |
| Berlin | 2026 | 46,341 | 2.5 (#7) | 0 / 130 | 0 | No seats |
| Brandenburg | 2024 | 12,462 | 0.8 (#10) | 0 / 88 | 0 | No seats |
| Hamburg | 2025 | 100,522 | 2.3 (#7) | 0 / 123 | ▼1 | No seats |
| Hesse | 2023 | 141,608 | 5.0 (#5) | 8 / 137 | ▼3 | Opposition |
| Lower Saxony | 2022 | 170,298 | 4.7 (#5) | 0 / 146 | ▼11 | No seats |
| Mecklenburg-Vorpommern | 2026 | 10,415 | 1.0 (#8) | 0 / 71 | ▼5 | No seats |
| North Rhine-Westphalia | 2022 | 418,460 | 5.9 (#4) | 12 / 195 | ▼16 | Opposition |
| Rhineland-Palatinate | 2026 | 42,083 | 2.1 (#7) | 0 / 101 | ▼6 | No seats |
| Saarland | 2022 | 21,618 | 4.8 (#5) | 0 / 51 | 0 | No seats |
| Saxony | 2024 | 20,995 | 0.9 (#10) | 0 / 119 | 0 | No seats |
| Saxony-Anhalt | 2026 | 33,969 | 2.58 (#7) | 0 / 83 | ▼7 | No seats |
| Schleswig-Holstein | 2022 | 88,613 | 6.4 (#4) | 5 / 69 | ▼4 | Opposition |
| Thuringia | 2024 | 13,582 | 1.1 (#7) | 0 / 90 | ▼5 | No seats |

Best historic results for state parties
| State | Seats / Total | % | Position/Gov. | Year | Lead Candidate |
|---|---|---|---|---|---|
| Baden-Württemberg | 23 / 121 | 18.01 (#3) | FDP–SPD–GB/BHE | 1952 | Reinhold Maier (Minister-President 1952–1953) |
| Bavaria | 16 / 187 | 8.0 (#5) | CDU–FDP | 2008 | Martin Zeil (Deputy Minister-President 2008–2013) |
| Berlin | 32 / 127 | 23.0 (#3) | CDU–FDP | 1950 | Carl-Hubert Schwennicke |
| Brandenburg | 6 / 88 | 6.6 (#4) | SPD–Greens–FDP | 1990 | Knut Sandler |
| Bremen | 12 / 100 | 11.8 (#3) | SPD–FDP | 1951 | Theodor Spitta (Deputy Mayor 1951–1955) |
| Hamburg | 7 / 110 | 18.2 (#3) | SPD–FDP | 1946 (as PFD) | Christian Koch (Second Mayor 1946–1950) |
| Hesse | 21 / 80 | 31.8 (#2) | Opposition | 1950 (as FDP–GB/BHE) | August-Martin Euler |
| Lower Saxony | 14 / 137 | 9.9 (#4) | Opposition | 2013 | Stefan Birkner |
| Mecklenburg-Vorpommern | 4 / 66 | 5.5 (#4) | CDU–FDP | 1990 | Klaus Gollert (Deputy Minister-President 1990–1994) |
| North Rhine-Westphalia | 28 / 199 | 12.6 (#3) | CDU–FDP | 2017 | Christian Lindner |
| Rhineland-Palatinate | 19 / 100 | 16.9 (#3) | CDU–FDP | 1951 | Anton Eberhard |
| Saarland | 13 / 50 | 24.2 (#2) | CDU–DPS–SPD | 1955 (as DPS) | Fritz Schuster |
| Saxony | 14 / 132 | 10.0 (#4) | CDU–FDP | 2009 | Holger Zastrow |
| Saxony-Anhalt | 14 / 106 | 13.5 (#3) | CDU–FDP | 1990 | Gerd Brunner (Deputy Minister-President 1990–1991) |
| Schleswig-Holstein | 14 / 95 | 14.9 (#3) | CDU–FDP | 2009 | Wolfgang Kubicki |
| Thuringia | 9 / 89 | 9.3 (#4) | CDU–FDP | 1990 | Hartmut Sieckmann |

=== Results timeline ===
| Year | (Germany) DE | | (European Union) EU | (Baden-Württemberg) BW | | | (Bavaria) BY | (Berlin) BE | (Brandenburg) BB | (Bremen (state)) HB | (Hamburg) HH | (Hesse) HE | (Lower Saxony) NI | (Mecklenburg-Vorpommern) MV | (North Rhine-Westphalia) NW | (Rhineland-Palatinate) RP | (Saarland) SL | (Saxony) SN | (Saxony-Anhalt) ST | (Schleswig-Holstein) SH | (Thuringia) TH |
| Year | (West Germany) WD | (East Germany) DD | (European Union) EU | (Grand Duchy of Baden) SB | WB | (Württemberg-Hohenzollern) WH | (Bavaria) BY | (Berlin) BE | (Brandenburg) BB | (Bremen (state)) HB | (Hamburg) HH | (Hesse) HE | (Lower Saxony) NI | (Mecklenburg-Vorpommern) MV | (North Rhine-Westphalia) NW | (Rhineland-Palatinate) RP | (Saarland) SL | (Saxony) SN | (Saxony-Anhalt) ST | (Schleswig-Holstein) SH | (Thuringia) TH |
|---|---|---|---|---|---|---|---|---|---|---|---|---|---|---|---|---|---|---|---|---|---|
| 1946 | N/A | N/A | N/A | | 19.5 | | 5.7 | 9.3 | 20.6 | 18.3 | **18.2** | 15.7 | | 12.5 | | | | 24.7 | 29.9 | | 24.6 |
| 1947 | N/A | N/A | N/A | 14.3 | | 17.7 | 5.7 | 9.3 | | ▲**19.4** | | 15.7 | 8.8 | | 6.0 | 9.8 | 7.6 | | | 5.0 | |
| 1948 | N/A | N/A | N/A | 14.3 | | | 5.7 | ▲16.1 | | | | 15.7 | 8.8 | | 6.0 | 9.8 | 7.6 | | | 5.0 | |
| 1949 | 11.9 | (Note: All East German Volkskammer elections bar that of 1990, as well as the 1950 East German state elections, were held on a non-competitive basis. Citizens could only vote for or against the "unity list" of the National Front of the GDR, which comprised the ruling SED and its subordinate bloc parties; these bloc parties included the Liberal Democratic Party of Germany, which was nominally a liberal party like the FDP.) | N/A | 14.3 | | | 5.7 | ▲16.1 | | | (Note: With the Father-City League of Hamburg) | 15.7 | 8.8 | | 6.0 | 9.8 | 7.6 | | | 5.0 | |
| 1950 | | | N/A | 14.3 | ▲21.1 | | ▲7.1 | ▲**23.1** | | | (Note: With the Father-City League of Hamburg) | ▲**31.8** | 8.8 | | ▲12.1 | 9.8 | 7.6 | | | ▲7.1 | |
| 1951 | | | N/A | 14.3 | ▲21.1 | | ▲7.1 | | | ▼11.8 | (Note: With the Father-City League of Hamburg) | ▲**31.8** | ▼8.3 | | ▲12.1 | ▲**16.7** | 7.6 | | | | |
| 1952 | | | N/A | **18.0** | | | ▲7.1 | | N/A | | (Note: With the Father-City League of Hamburg) | ▲**31.8** | ▼8.3 | N/A | ▲12.1 | | Banned | N/A | N/A | | |
| 1953 | ▼9.5 | | N/A | | | | ▲7.1 | | N/A | | (Note: With the Hamburg Bloc) | ▲**31.8** | ▼8.3 | N/A | ▲12.1 | | Banned | N/A | N/A | | |
| 1954 | | | N/A | | | | ▲7.2 | ▼12.8 | N/A | | | ▼20.5 | ▼8.3 | N/A | ▼11.5 | | Banned | N/A | N/A | ▲7.5 | |
| 1955 | | | N/A | | | | | ▼12.8 | N/A | ▼8.6 | | ▼20.5 | ▼7.9 | N/A | ▼11.5 | ▼12.7 | **24.2** | N/A | N/A | | |
| 1956 | | | N/A | ▼16.6 | | | | ▼12.8 | N/A | | | ▼20.5 | ▼7.9 | N/A | | | | N/A | N/A | | |
| 1957 | ▼7.7 | | N/A | | | | | ▼12.8 | N/A | | 8.6 | ▼20.5 | | N/A | | | | N/A | N/A | | |
| 1958 | ▼7.7 | | N/A | | | | ▼5.6 | ▼3.8 | N/A | | | ▼9.5 | | N/A | ▼7.1 | | | N/A | N/A | ▼5.4 | |
| 1959 | ▼7.7 | | N/A | | | | | ▼3.8 | N/A | ▼7.2 | | ▼9.5 | ▼5.2 | N/A | ▼7.1 | ▼9.7 | | N/A | N/A | | |
| 1960 | ▼7.7 | | N/A | ▼15.8 | | | | ▼3.8 | N/A | | | ▼9.5 | | N/A | ▼7.1 | | ▼13.8 | N/A | N/A | | |
| 1961 | ▲12.8 | | N/A | | | | | ▼3.8 | N/A | | ▲9.6 | ▼9.5 | | N/A | ▼7.1 | | | N/A | N/A | | |
| 1962 | | | N/A | | | | ▲5.9 | ▼3.8 | N/A | | | ▲11.4 | | N/A | ▼6.8 | | | N/A | N/A | ▲7.9 | |
| 1963 | | | N/A | | | | ▲5.9 | ▲7.9 | N/A | ▲8.4 | | ▲11.4 | ▲8.8 | N/A | | ▲10.1 | | N/A | N/A | | |
| 1964 | | | N/A | ▼13.1 | | | ▲5.9 | | N/A | | | ▲11.4 | ▲8.8 | N/A | | | | N/A | N/A | | |
| 1965 | ▼9.5 | | N/A | ▼13.1 | | | ▲5.9 | | N/A | | | ▲11.4 | | N/A | | | ▼8.3 | N/A | N/A | | |
| 1966 | ▼9.5 | | N/A | | | | ▼5.1 | | N/A | | ▼6.8 | ▼10.4 | | N/A | ▲7.4 | | | N/A | N/A | | |
| 1967 | ▼9.5 | | N/A | | | | ▼5.1 | ▼7.1 | N/A | ▲10.5 | ▼6.8 | ▼10.4 | ▼6.9 | N/A | | ▼8.3 | | N/A | N/A | ▼5.9 | |
| 1968 | ▼9.5 | | N/A | ▲14.4 | | | ▼5.1 | | N/A | | ▼6.8 | ▼10.4 | ▼6.9 | N/A | | | | N/A | N/A | | |
| 1969 | ▼5.8 | | N/A | ▲14.4 | | | ▼5.1 | | N/A | | ▼6.8 | ▼10.4 | ▼6.9 | N/A | | | | N/A | N/A | | |
| 1970 | | | N/A | ▲14.4 | | | ▲5.6 | | N/A | | ▲7.1 | ▼10.1 | ▼4.4 | N/A | ▼5.5 | | ▼4.4 | N/A | N/A | | |
| 1971 | | | N/A | ▲14.4 | | | ▲5.6 | ▲8.4 | N/A | ▼7.1 | | | ▼4.4 | N/A | | ▼5.9 | ▼4.4 | N/A | N/A | ▼3.8 | |
| 1972 | ▲8.4 | | N/A | ▼8.9 | | | ▲5.6 | ▲8.4 | N/A | ▼7.1 | | | ▼4.4 | N/A | | ▼5.9 | ▼4.4 | N/A | N/A | ▼3.8 | |
| 1973 | | | N/A | ▼8.9 | | | ▲5.6 | ▲8.4 | N/A | ▼7.1 | | | ▼4.4 | N/A | | ▼5.9 | ▼4.4 | N/A | N/A | ▼3.8 | |
| 1974 | | | N/A | ▼8.9 | | | ▼5.2 | ▲8.4 | N/A | ▼7.1 | ▲10.9 | ▼7.4 | ▲7.0 | N/A | | ▼5.9 | ▼4.4 | N/A | N/A | ▼3.8 | |
| 1975 | | | N/A | ▼8.9 | | | ▼5.2 | ▼7.1 | N/A | ▲13.0 | | | ▲7.0 | N/A | ▲6.7 | ▼5.6 | ▲7.4 | N/A | N/A | ▲7.1 | |
| 1976 | ▼7.9 | | N/A | ▼7.8 | | | ▼5.2 | | N/A | ▲13.0 | | | | N/A | | ▼5.6 | ▲7.4 | N/A | N/A | ▲7.1 | |
| 1977 | | | N/A | ▼7.8 | | | ▼5.2 | | N/A | ▲13.0 | | | | N/A | | ▼5.6 | | N/A | N/A | ▲7.1 | |
| 1978 | | | N/A | ▼7.8 | | | ▲6.2 | | N/A | ▲13.0 | ▼4.8 | ▼6.6 | ▼4.2 | N/A | | ▼5.6 | | N/A | N/A | ▲7.1 | |
| 1979 | | | 6.0 | ▼7.8 | | | ▲6.2 | ▲8.1 | N/A | ▼10.7 | ▼4.8 | | ▼4.2 | N/A | | ▲6.4 | | N/A | N/A | ▼5.7 | |
| 1980 | ▲10.6 | | 6.0 | ▲8.3 | | | ▲6.2 | ▲8.1 | N/A | ▼10.7 | ▼4.8 | | ▼4.2 | N/A | ▼5.0 | ▲6.4 | ▼6.9 | N/A | N/A | ▼5.7 | |
| 1981 | | | 6.0 | ▲8.3 | | | ▲6.2 | ▼5.6 | N/A | ▼10.7 | ▼4.8 | | ▼4.2 | N/A | ▼5.0 | ▲6.4 | | N/A | N/A | ▼5.7 | |
| 1982 | | | 6.0 | ▲8.3 | | | ▼3.5 | ▼5.6 | N/A | ▼10.7 | ▲4.9 | ▼3.1 | ▲5.9 | N/A | ▼5.0 | ▲6.4 | | N/A | N/A | ▼5.7 | |
| 1983 | ▼6.9 | | 6.0 | ▲8.3 | | | ▼3.5 | | N/A | ▼4.6 | ▼2.6 | ▲7.6 | ▲5.9 | N/A | ▼5.0 | ▼3.5 | | N/A | N/A | ▼2.2 | |
| 1984 | | | ▼4.8 | ▼7.2 | | | ▼3.5 | | N/A | ▼4.6 | ▼2.6 | ▲7.6 | ▲5.9 | N/A | ▼5.0 | ▼3.5 | | N/A | N/A | ▼2.2 | |
| 1985 | | | ▼4.8 | ▼7.2 | | | ▼3.5 | ▲8.5 | N/A | ▼4.6 | ▼2.6 | ▲7.6 | ▲5.9 | N/A | ▲6.0 | ▼3.5 | ▲10.0 | N/A | N/A | ▼2.2 | |
| 1986 | | | ▼4.8 | ▼7.2 | | | ▲3.8 | | N/A | ▼4.6 | ▲4.8 | ▲7.6 | ▲6.0 | N/A | ▲6.0 | ▼3.5 | ▲10.0 | N/A | N/A | ▼2.2 | |
| 1987 | ▲9.1 | | ▼4.8 | ▼7.2 | | | ▲3.8 | | N/A | ▲10.0 | ▲6.5 | ▲7.8 | | N/A | ▲6.0 | ▲7.3 | ▲10.0 | N/A | N/A | ▲5.2 | |
| 1988 | | | ▼4.8 | ▼5.9 | | | ▲3.8 | | N/A | ▲10.0 | | | | N/A | ▲6.0 | | ▲10.0 | N/A | N/A | ▼4.4 | |
| 1989 | | | ▲5.6 | ▼5.9 | | | ▲3.8 | ▼3.9 | N/A | ▲10.0 | | | | N/A | ▲6.0 | | ▲10.0 | N/A | N/A | ▼4.4 | |
| 1990 | ▲11.0 | 5.3 (Note: Results for the Association of Free Democrats) | ▲5.6 | ▼5.9 | | | ▲5.2 | ▲7.1 | 6.6 | ▲10.0 | | | 6.0 | 5.5 | ▼5.8 | | ▼5.6 | 5.3 | **13.5** | ▼4.4 | **9.3** |
| 1991 | | | ▲5.6 | ▼5.9 | | | ▲5.2 | ▲7.1 | | ▼9.5 | ▼5.4 | ▼7.4 | 6.0 | | ▼5.8 | ▼6.9 | ▼5.6 | 5.3 | | ▼4.4 | |
| 1992 | | | ▲5.6 | 5.9 | | | ▲5.2 | ▲7.1 | | | ▼5.4 | ▼7.4 | 6.0 | | ▼5.8 | | ▼5.6 | 5.3 | | ▲5.6 | |
| 1993 | | | ▲5.6 | 5.9 | | | ▲5.2 | ▲7.1 | | | ▼4.2 | ▼7.4 | 6.0 | | ▼5.8 | | ▼5.6 | 5.3 | | ▲5.6 | |
| 1994 | ▼6.9 | | ▼4.1 | 5.9 | | | ▼2.8 | ▲7.1 | ▼2.2 | | ▼4.2 | ▼7.4 | ▼4.4 | ▼3.8 | ▼5.8 | | ▼2.1 | ▼1.7 | ▼3.6 | ▲5.6 | ▼3.2 |
| 1995 | | | ▼4.1 | 5.9 | | | ▼2.8 | ▼2.5 | ▼2.2 | ▼3.4 | ▼4.2 | 7.4 | ▼4.4 | ▼3.8 | ▼4.0 | | ▼2.1 | ▼1.7 | ▼3.6 | ▲5.6 | ▼3.2 |
| 1996 | | | ▼4.1 | ▲9.6 | | | ▼2.8 | ▼2.5 | ▼2.2 | ▼3.4 | ▼4.2 | 7.4 | ▼4.4 | ▼3.8 | ▼4.0 | ▲8.9 | ▼2.1 | ▼1.7 | ▼3.6 | ▲5.7 | ▼3.2 |
| 1997 | | | ▼4.1 | | | | ▼2.8 | ▼2.5 | ▼2.2 | ▼3.4 | ▼3.5 | 7.4 | ▼4.4 | ▼3.8 | ▼4.0 | | ▼2.1 | ▼1.7 | ▼3.6 | ▲5.7 | ▼3.2 |
| 1998 | ▼6.2 | | ▼4.1 | | | | ▼1.7 | ▼2.5 | ▼2.2 | ▼3.4 | ▼3.5 | 7.4 | ▲4.9 | ▼1.6 | ▼4.0 | | ▼2.1 | ▼1.7 | ▲4.2 | ▲5.7 | ▼3.2 |
| 1999 | ▼6.2 | | ▼3.0 | | | | ▼1.7 | ▼2.2 | ▼1.9 | ▼2.5 | ▼3.5 | ▼5.1 | ▲4.9 | ▼1.6 | ▼4.0 | | ▲2.6 | ▼1.1 | ▲4.2 | ▲5.7 | ▼1.1 |
| 2000 | ▼6.2 | | ▼3.0 | | | | ▼1.7 | ▼2.2 | ▼1.9 | ▼2.5 | ▼3.5 | | ▲4.9 | ▼1.6 | ▲9.8 | | ▲2.6 | ▼1.1 | ▲4.2 | ▲7.6 | ▼1.1 |
| 2001 | ▼6.2 | | ▼3.0 | ▼8.1 | | | ▼1.7 | ▲9.9 | ▼1.9 | ▼2.5 | ▲5.1 | | ▲4.9 | ▼1.6 | ▲9.8 | ▼7.8 | ▲2.6 | ▼1.1 | ▲4.2 | ▲7.6 | ▼1.1 |
| 2002 | ▲7.4 | | ▼3.0 | | | | ▼1.7 | ▲9.9 | ▼1.9 | ▼2.5 | | | ▲4.9 | ▲4.7 | ▲9.8 | | ▲2.6 | ▼1.1 | ▲13.3 | ▲7.6 | ▼1.1 |
| 2003 | ▲7.4 | | ▼3.0 | | | | ▲2.6 | ▲9.9 | ▼1.9 | ▲4.2 | | ▲7.9 | ▲8.1 | ▲4.7 | ▲9.8 | | ▲2.6 | ▼1.1 | | ▲7.6 | ▼1.1 |
| 2004 | ▲7.4 | | ▲6.1 | | | | ▲2.6 | ▲9.9 | ▲3.3 | ▲4.2 | ▼2.8 | ▲7.9 | | ▲4.7 | ▲9.8 | | ▲5.2 | ▲5.9 | | ▲7.6 | ▲3.6 |
| 2005 | ▲9.8 | | ▲6.1 | | | | ▲2.6 | ▲9.9 | ▲3.3 | ▲4.2 | ▼2.8 | ▲7.9 | | ▲4.7 | ▼6.2 | | ▲5.2 | ▲5.9 | | ▼6.6 | ▲3.6 |
| 2006 | ▲9.8 | | ▲6.1 | ▲10.7 | | | ▲2.6 | ▼7.6 | ▲3.3 | ▲4.2 | ▼2.8 | ▲7.9 | | ▲**9.6** | | ▲8.0 | ▲5.2 | ▲5.9 | ▼6.7 | ▼6.6 | ▲3.6 |
| 2007 | ▲9.8 | | ▲6.1 | | | | ▲2.6 | ▼7.6 | ▲3.3 | ▲6.0 | ▼2.8 | ▲7.9 | | ▲**9.6** | | ▲8.0 | ▲5.2 | ▲5.9 | ▼6.7 | ▼6.6 | ▲3.6 |
| 2008 | ▲9.8 | | ▲6.1 | | | | ▲**8.0** | ▼7.6 | ▲3.3 | ▲6.0 | ▲4.8 | ▲9.4 | ▲8.2 | ▲**9.6** | | ▲8.0 | ▲5.2 | ▲5.9 | ▼6.7 | ▼6.6 | ▲3.6 |
| 2009 | ▲**14.6** | | ▲**11.0** | | | | | ▼7.6 | ▲**7.2** | ▲6.0 | ▲4.8 | ▲16.2 | | ▲**9.6** | | ▲8.0 | ▲9.2 | ▲**10.0** | ▼6.7 | ▲**14.9** | ▲7.6 |
| 2010 | | | ▲**11.0** | | | | | ▼7.6 | ▲**7.2** | ▲6.0 | ▲4.8 | | | ▲**9.6** | ▲6.7 | ▲8.0 | | | ▼6.7 | | ▲7.6 |
| 2011 | | | ▲**11.0** | ▼5.3 | | | | ▼1.8 | ▲**7.2** | ▼2.4 | ▲6.7 | | | ▼2.8 | ▲6.7 | ▼4.2 | | | ▼3.8 | | ▲7.6 |
| 2012 | | | ▲**11.0** | ▼5.3 | | | | ▼1.8 | ▲**7.2** | ▼2.4 | ▲6.7 | | | ▼2.8 | ▲8.6 | ▼4.2 | ▼1.2 | | ▼3.8 | ▼8.2 | ▲7.6 |
| 2013 | ▼4.8 | | ▲**11.0** | ▼5.3 | | | ▼3.3 | ▼1.8 | ▲**7.2** | ▼2.4 | ▲6.7 | ▼5.0 | ▲**9.9** | ▼2.8 | ▲8.6 | ▼4.2 | ▼1.2 | | ▼3.8 | ▼8.2 | ▲7.6 |
| 2014 | ▼4.8 | | ▼3.5 | ▼5.3 | | | ▼3.3 | ▼1.8 | ▼1.5 | ▼2.4 | ▲6.7 | ▼5.0 | ▲**9.9** | ▼2.8 | ▲8.6 | ▼4.2 | ▼1.2 | ▼3.8 | ▼3.8 | ▼8.2 | ▼2.5 |
| 2015 | ▼4.8 | | ▼3.5 | ▼5.3 | | | ▼3.3 | ▼1.8 | ▼1.5 | ▲6.6 | ▲7.4 | ▼5.0 | ▲**9.9** | ▼2.8 | ▲8.6 | ▼4.2 | ▼1.2 | ▼3.8 | ▼3.8 | ▼8.2 | ▼2.5 |
| 2016 | ▼4.8 | | ▼3.5 | ▲8.3 | | | ▼3.3 | ▲6.7 | ▼1.5 | ▲6.6 | ▲7.4 | ▼5.0 | ▲**9.9** | ▲3.0 | ▲8.6 | ▲6.2 | ▼1.2 | ▼3.8 | ▲4.9 | ▼8.2 | ▼2.5 |
| 2017 | ▲10.7 | | ▼3.5 | ▲8.3 | | | ▼3.3 | ▲6.7 | ▼1.5 | ▲6.6 | ▲7.4 | ▼5.0 | ▼7.5 | ▲3.0 | ▲**12.6** | | ▲3.3 | ▼3.8 | ▲4.9 | ▲11.5 | ▼2.5 |
| 2018 | ▲10.7 | | ▼3.5 | ▲8.3 | | | ▲5.1 | ▲6.7 | ▼1.5 | ▲6.6 | ▲7.4 | ▲7.5 | ▼7.5 | ▲3.0 | | | ▲3.3 | ▼3.8 | ▲4.9 | | ▼2.5 |
| 2019 | ▲10.7 | | ▲5.4 | ▲8.3 | | | ▲5.1 | ▲6.7 | ▲4.1 | ▼5.9 | ▲7.4 | ▲7.5 | ▼7.5 | ▲3.0 | | | ▲3.3 | ▲4.5 | ▲4.9 | | ▲5.0 |
| 2020 | ▲10.7 | | ▲5.4 | ▲8.3 | | | ▲5.1 | ▲6.7 | ▲4.1 | ▼5.9 | ▼4.9 | ▲7.5 | ▼7.5 | ▲3.0 | | | ▲3.3 | ▲4.5 | ▲4.9 | | |
| 2021 | ▲11.4 | | ▲5.4 | ▲10.5 | | | ▲5.1 | ▲7.2 | ▲4.1 | ▼5.9 | ▼4.9 | ▲7.5 | ▼7.5 | ▲5.8 | | ▼5.5 | ▲3.3 | ▲4.5 | ▲6.4 | | |
| 2022 | | | ▲5.4 | ▲10.5 | | | ▲5.1 | ▲7.2 | ▲4.1 | ▼5.9 | ▼4.9 | ▲7.5 | ▼4.7 | ▲5.8 | ▼5.9 | | ▲4.8 | ▲4.5 | | ▼6.4 | |
| 2023 | | | ▲5.4 | ▲10.5 | | | ▼3.0 | ▼4.6 | ▲4.1 | ▼5.1 | ▼4.9 | ▼5.0 | ▼4.7 | ▲5.8 | ▼5.9 | | ▲4.8 | ▲4.5 | | ▼6.4 | |
| 2024 | | | ▼5.2 | ▲10.5 | | | ▼3.0 | ▼4.6 | ▼0.8 | ▼5.1 | ▼4.9 | ▼5.0 | ▼4.7 | ▲5.8 | ▼5.9 | | ▲4.8 | ▼0.9 | | ▼6.4 | ▼1.1 |
| 2025 | ▼4.3 | | ▼5.2 | ▲10.5 | | | ▼3.0 | ▼4.6 | ▼0.8 | ▼5.1 | ▼2.3 | ▼5.0 | ▼4.7 | ▲5.8 | ▼5.9 | | ▲4.8 | ▼0.9 | | ▼6.4 | ▼1.1 |
| 2026 | ▼4.3 | | ▼5.2 | ▼4.4 | | | ▼3.0 | ▼2.5 | ▼0.8 | ▼5.1 | ▼2.3 | ▼5.0 | ▼4.7 | ▼1.0 | ▼5.9 | ▼2.1 | ▲4.8 | ▼0.9 | ▼2.6 | ▼6.4 | ▼1.1 |
| Year | (Germany) DE | | (European Union) EU | (Baden-Württemberg) BW | | | (Bavaria) BY | (Berlin) BE | (Brandenburg) BB | (Bremen (state)) HB | (Hamburg) HH | (Hesse) HE | (Lower Saxony) NI | (Mecklenburg-Vorpommern) MV | (North Rhine-Westphalia) NW | (Rhineland-Palatinate) RP | (Saarland) SL | (Saxony) SN | (Saxony-Anhalt) ST | (Schleswig-Holstein) SH | (Thuringia) TH |
**Bold** indicates best result to date. Present in legislature (in opposition); Junior coalition partner Senior coalition partner

== Leadership ==
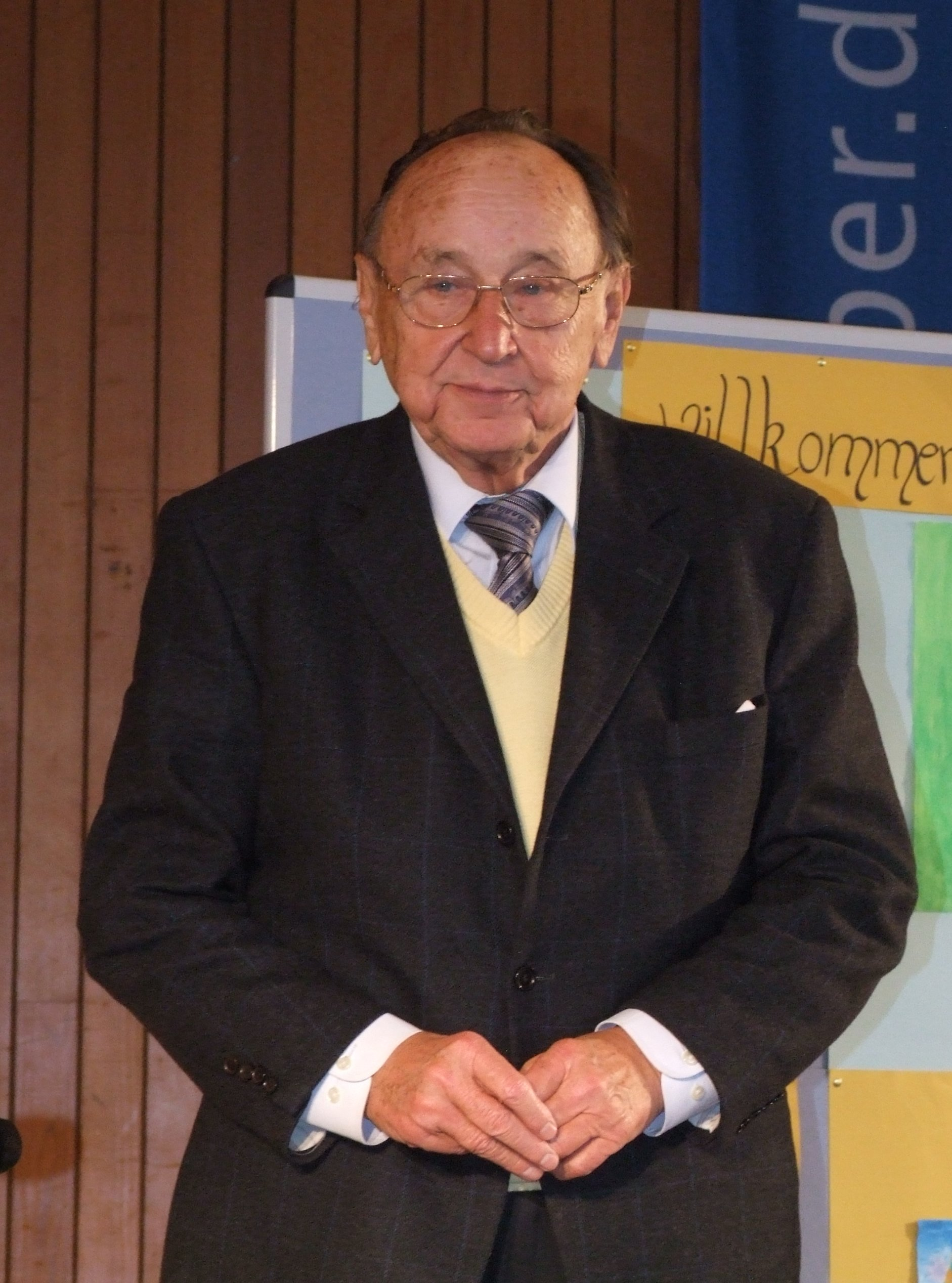
Hans-Dietrich Genscher served almost continuously as Foreign Minister and Vice Chancellor from 1974 to 1992.

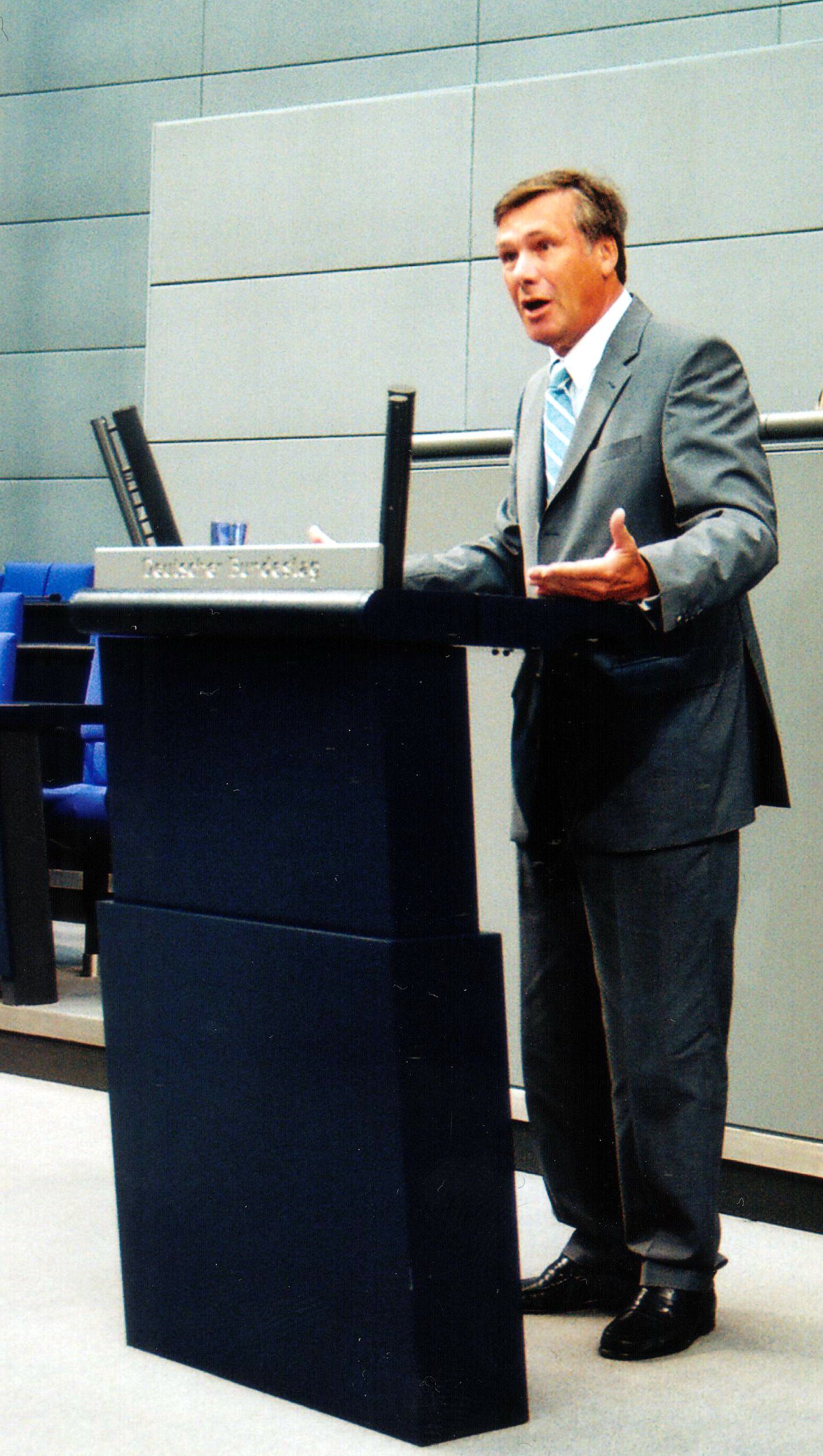
Wolfgang Gerhardt

=== Leader of the FDP ===
| Leader | | Year |
|---|---|---|
| 1 | Theodor Heuss | 1948–1949 |
| 2 | Franz Blücher | 1949–1954 |
| 3 | Thomas Dehler | 1954–1957 |
| 4 | Reinhold Maier | 1957–1960 |
| 5 | Erich Mende | 1960–1968 |
| 6 | Walter Scheel | 1968–1974 |
| 7 | Hans-Dietrich Genscher | 1974–1985 |
| 8 | Martin Bangemann | 1985–1988 |
| 9 | Otto Graf Lambsdorff | 1988–1993 |
| 10 | Klaus Kinkel | 1993–1995 |
| 11 | Wolfgang Gerhardt | 1995–2001 |
| 12 | Guido Westerwelle | 2001–2011 |
| 13 | Philipp Rösler | 2011–2013 |
| 14 | Christian Lindner | 2013–2025 |
| 15 | Christian Dürr | 2025–2026 |
| 16 | Wolfgang Kubicki | since 2026 |

=== Leader of the FDP in the Bundestag ===
| Leader in the Bundestag | | Year |
|---|---|---|
| 1 | Theodor Heuss | 1949 |
| 2 | Hermann Schäfer (First term) | 1949–1951 |
| 3 | August-Martin Euler | 1951–1952 |
| (2) | Hermann Schäfer (Second term) | 1952–1953 |
| 4 | Thomas Dehler | 1953–1957 |
| 5 | Max Becker | 1957 |
| 6 | Erich Mende | 1957–1963 |
| 7 | Knut von Kühlmann-Stumm | 1963–1968 |
| 8 | Wolfgang Mischnick | 1968–1991 |
| 9 | Hermann Otto Solms | 1991–1998 |
| 10 | Wolfgang Gerhardt | 1998–2006 |
| 11 | Guido Westerwelle | 2006–2009 |
| 12 | Birgit Homburger | 2009–2011 |
| 13 | Rainer Brüderle | 2011–2013 |
| | No seats in the Bundestag | 2013–2017 |
| 14 | Christian Lindner | 2017–2021 |
| 15 | Christian Dürr | 2021–2025 |
| | No seats in the Bundestag | since 2025 |

== See also ==
- Federal Association of Liberal Students Groups
- Franz Xaver Kappus
- Liberalism in Germany
- List of major liberal parties considered right
- List of political parties in Germany
- Politics of Germany
