= Free Democratic Party (East Germany) =

Political party in the GDR

Free Democratic Party Freie Demokratische Partei der DDR
- Abbreviation: F.D.P.
- Leader: Bruno Menzel
- Founded: 4 February 1990
- Dissolved: 11 August 1990
- Merged into: Free Democratic Party
- Headquarters: East Berlin
- Ideology: Liberalism (German)
- Political position: Centre-right
- National affiliation: Association of Free Democrats

The Free Democratic Party of the GDR (German: Freie Demokratische Partei der DDR, F.D.P.) was an opposition political party in East Germany. The appeal for its formation was made on 25 November 1989 in Berlin by those East German liberals who doubted the ability of the former block party Liberal Democratic Party of Germany to reform itself. It was formally founded 4 February 1990; on 12 February 1990, it joined the Association of Free Democrats for the Volkskammer elections.

== See also ==
- Liberalism
- Contributions to liberal theory
- Liberalism worldwide
- List of liberal parties
- Liberal democracy
- Liberalism in Germany

Preceded by -	Liberal German parties	Succeeded by Free Democratic Party (Germany)
