= Oskar Brüsewitz =

German priest

- Born: May 30, 1929; Vilkyškiai, Lithuania
- Died: August 22, 1976 (age 47); Halle, East Germany
- Occupation: Lutheran pastor

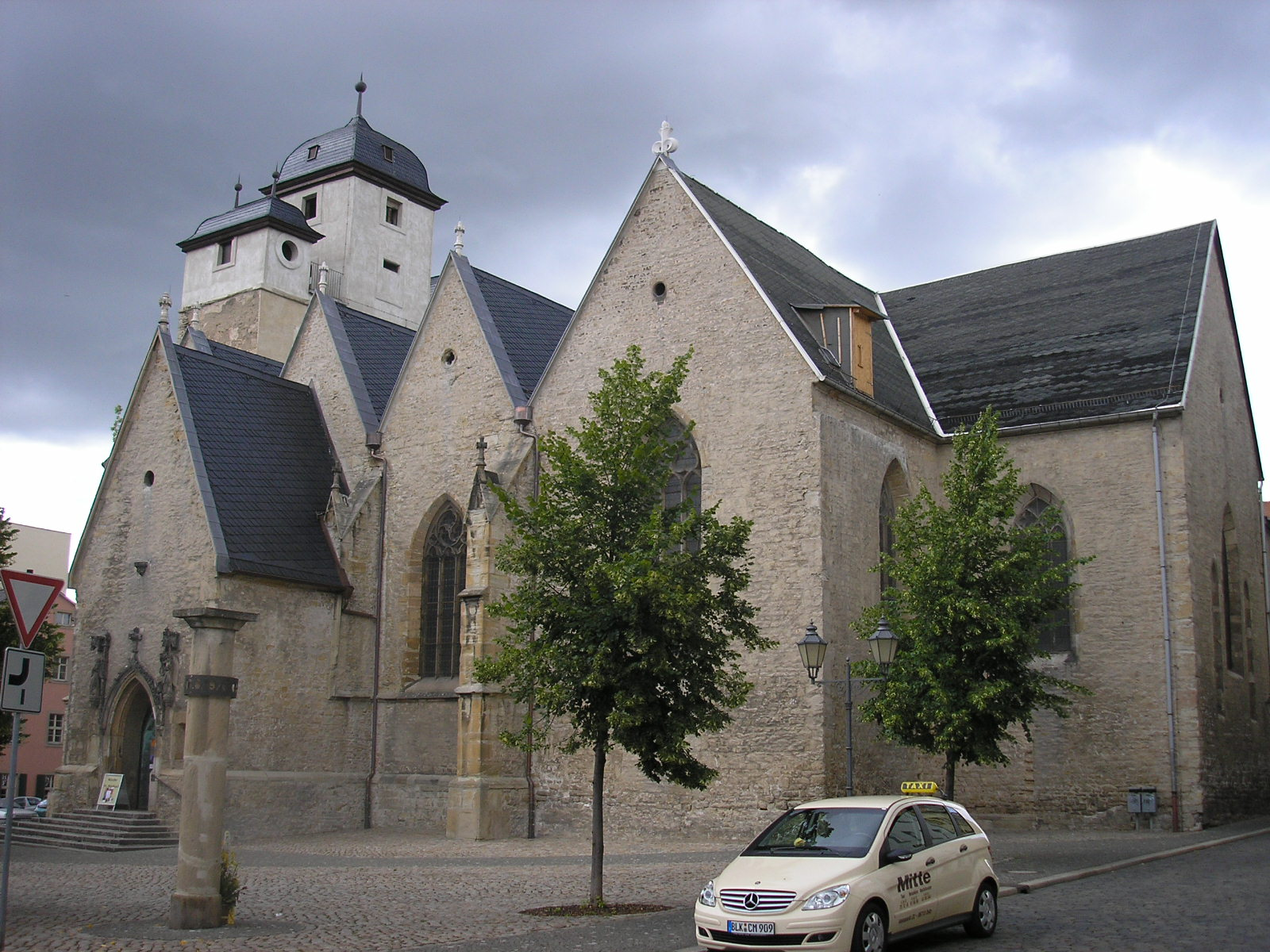
Michaelis church in Zeitz with a memorial to Brüsewitz in front

Oskar Brüsewitz (May 30, 1929 – 22 August 1976) was an East German Lutheran pastor who committed public self-immolation on August 18, 1976, to protest the repression of religion in the Communist state of East Germany. He died four days later.

== Biography ==
With the Second World War nearing its end, Brüsewitz, age fifteen, was drafted into the Wehrmacht in Warsaw. An attempt to desert failed. He was captured by the Red Army and became a prisoner of war. He worked as a shoemaker after the war and converted to Christianity in 1954, then attended a Lutheran seminary from 1964 until 1969 in Erfurt. In 1970 he was ordained in the Evangelical Lutheran Church at Rippicha, near the town of Zeitz. He was critical of the East German Communist regime imposed by the Soviet Union after the war and symbolic acts of protest, including the installation of a cross of neon lamps at his church, brought him to the attention of the authorities. The leadership of his church sided with the state, rather than its priest, and asked, in 1976, for Brüsewitz to be moved to another rectorate. This was the immediate trigger for his suicidal protest in a crowded public square in front of the Michaelis church in Zeitz. In front of hundreds of persons, Reverend Brüsewitz "poured gasoline over himself and lighted up in flames". Neues Deutschland, the daily newspaper of the Communist SED party, reported the event afterward and described Brüsewitz as "an abnormal and sick man who suffered from delusions." The fire was quickly doused by officials from the Ministry for State security, but Brüsewitz died four days later from his burns.

On the day of his protest he carried pamphlets accusing the communists of repression which read; "Funkspruch an alle: Die Kirche in der DDR klagt den Kommunismus an! Wegen Unterdrückung in Schulen an Kindern und Jugendlichen" ("A radio transmission for all: The church in the GDR denounces Communism! Because of the oppression of children and youth in school"). In his suicide note he wrote of a "feigned deep peace, which had also intruded Christianity" in East Germany while in truth there was "a mighty war between light and darkness" ("zwischen Licht und Finsternis ein mächtiger Krieg").

Brüsewitz died of his severe burns on August 22, 1976, in a hospital in Halle Dölau. His self-sacrifice brought support from both his parishioners and figures in the church and led to a reappraisal within the church hierarchy of its relationship with the Communist dictatorship. The Protestant Church now sees Brüsewitz's protest as an early step towards the mass popular protests which led to the collapse of East Germany in 1989.

The Communist authorities initially attempted to suppress news of the event then, when news leaked and public support for his action grew, they branded him a psychopath. On August 31 Neues Deutschland, the official newspaper of the ruling Socialist Unity Party (SED), printed an article entitled "Du sollst nicht falsch Zeugnis reden" "You shall not bear false witness" which asserted that self-immolation was the action of a sick, crazy man. A similar article appeared in Neue Zeit, the newspaper of the East German Christian Democratic Union.

The Protestant church of the ecclesiastical province of Saxony commemorated his sacrifice twenty years later in 1996, six years after the reunification of Germany. Bishop Dehmke called his death an "act of desperation" in protest against the repressive nature of the Communist regime and the collaboration of church members who had grown too close to the state.

To mark the 30th anniversary of his death, Neues Deutschland wrote an apology for the article they had carried at the time, admitting that the piece had been "slanderous" and not written by their journalists, but by an office of the Central Committee of the SED. In addition they published some of the thousands of critical letters to the editor they had received but not printed in 1976. In the Federal Republic of Germany, the Paneuropa-Union established a Brüsewitz-Center to document the repression of opposition within the former East Germany.

Brüsewitz's death is known in Germany as the Fanal von Zeitz or "Fire Signal of Zeitz".
