= Law on the interruption of pregnancy in the German Democratic Republic =

1972 law to regulate abortion

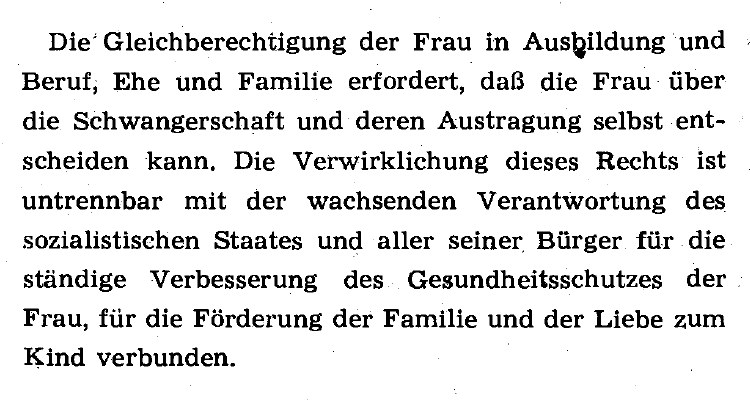
Preamble of the law as promulgated in the GDR Law Gazette

The Law on the Interruption of Pregnancy was a law passed by the Volkskammer, the parliament of the German Democratic Republic (GDR), on March 9, 1972, to regulate abortion. With its adoption, a fundamental revision of the law on abortion was introduced in the GDR in the form of a time limit solution, in contrast to the previously applicable indication-based regulation. This gave women the right to decide on their own responsibility whether to terminate a pregnancy within twelve weeks of its onset. According to the law, the doctor involved was obliged to advise the pregnant woman on the medical significance of the procedure and the future use of contraceptive methods and substances.

The law met with criticism and rejection from the churches of both confessions and parts of the medical community in the GDR, but there was no public debate. Until the political change in 1989, however, the resolution on the law was the only vote in the history of the Volkskammer that was not unanimous, as there were 14 votes against and eight abstentions. The legal situation created by the law in the GDR, which was the first time in German legal history that a time limit for abortion came into force, subsequently influenced the debate on the amendment of Section 218 of the German Criminal Code and the resulting legislative initiatives in the Federal Republic of Germany, as well as the revision of Section 218 of the German Criminal Code following German reunification.

== Origin and content ==
=== Legal development ===
Until 1943, the legal basis for abortion in Germany was the Reich Criminal Code passed in 1871 with Sections 218–220, the punishment for which had been softened in a new version passed in 1926. In a ruling on March 11, 1927, the Reich Court also added a strict medical indication as an exception formulated by the judiciary to the provisions of the Criminal Code, which represented a general ban on abortion without defined indications. According to this ruling, the existence of a "present danger to the pregnant woman that could not be eliminated in any other way" was considered a justification in the form of a supra-legal state of emergency. In the Third Reich, the view on the normative basis of the ban on abortion changed fundamentally, as the killing of the expectant or unborn life was no longer the primary justification. Instead, deprivation of the father and the state and, from 1943, "impairment of the vitality of the German people" were now regarded as the basis for criminal liability.

Furthermore, with the exception of medical indications, the strict ban only applied to pregnancies that were desirable in terms of racial hygiene. In the case of parents who were considered "hereditarily ill and inferior" according to National Socialist ideology, however, eugenic indications were also permitted and even advocated. From 1943, abortion was punishable by death if "the vitality of the German people continued to be impaired". For other cases of abortion, the prison sentence of up to 15 years was restored. However, it could only be imposed on the pregnant woman in particularly serious cases, which were not defined in the law; imprisonment remained possible against third parties in less serious cases.

After the end of the Second World War, the legal situation in the individual states of the Soviet occupation zone was replaced between 1945 and 1948 by new regulations with extended indication models. Due to the consequences of the war, these included a specific criminological indication for pregnancy after rape or sexual abuse, for example in Thuringia by the "Law on the interruption of pregnancy caused by a moral crime" of August 29, 1945, and, with the exception of the law of Saxony-Anhalt, also a social indication in the case of existing or impending social hardship, for example in Thuringia through the "Law on the interruption of pregnancy" of December 18, 1947. In Mecklenburg, the embryopathic indication was also introduced in 1947. In addition, the punishment was considerably reduced compared to the previous legal regulations.

Around a year after the GDR was founded, the Law on Mother and Child Protection and Women's Rights came into force on September 27, 1950, which introduced a uniform regulation of the indications for abortion in Section 11, which was more restrictive than the previous regulations. According to Section 11, an abortion was only permitted on medical or embryopathic grounds "if carrying the child to term would seriously endanger the life or health of the pregnant woman or if one of the parents was afflicted with a serious hereditary disease" and permission had been granted by a commission made up of doctors, representatives of health care bodies and the Democratic Women's Association. In addition to promoting equal rights for women and increasing their employment, the aim of the Law on Mother and Child Protection and Women's Rights was in particular to promote births as part of population policy. In the following years, the legal situation in the GDR from 1950 onwards led to one of the lowest rates of approved abortions in the world on the one hand, and on the other to an increase in the number of illegal abortions and to women turning to doctors in West Berlin for abortions until the construction of the Berlin Wall.

In March 1965, an internal circular of the Ministry of Health, without changing the text of the law, extended the application of Section 11 to include a criminal and a social indication. The other cases of abortion remained prohibited and punishable, and the criminal provisions of the state laws initially continued to apply and were replaced in 1968 by Sections 153-155 of the GDR Criminal Code.

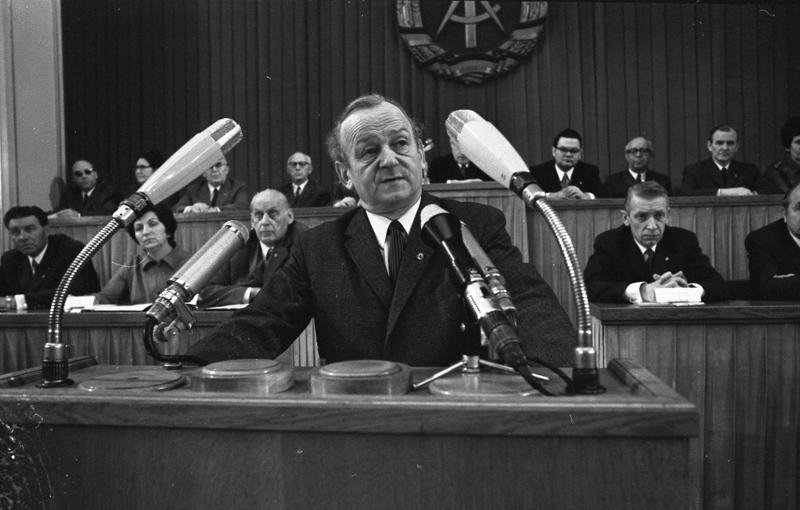
Ludwig Mecklinger, Minister of Health of the GDR from 1971 to 1989, during the session of the Volkskammer on March 9, 1972, on the law on the interruption of pregnancy

With the 1972 law on the interruption of pregnancy, the indication-based legal situation was then completely replaced by a time limit regulation. Even after the law was passed and promulgated in the GDR Law Gazette on March 15, 1972, Sections 153-155 of the GDR Criminal Code remained in full force and unchanged, as an interruption of pregnancy was considered illegal under criminal law if it was performed "contrary to the statutory provisions". In contrast to Section 218 of the German Criminal Code, the specific definition of the requirements for permissibility was therefore not part of the provisions of the StGB-GDR, but was instead set out in the corresponding laws of 1950 and 1972. The main reasons for the new regulation in 1972, as with the extension of the indications in 1965, were the high number of unreported illegal abortions, the increasing demands for women's self-determination as well as the rejuvenation and increase in the proportion of women among doctors in the GDR. In addition, a "race" with the reform efforts of the social-liberal coalition in the Federal Republic of Germany may have played a role in the timing. Both in the context of legal history and in an international comparison[15], the recognition of the decision to terminate a pregnancy as a woman's right was particularly new; a comparable formulation can only be found in the regulation adopted in Denmark one year later.

With the Unification Treaty of August 31, 1990, § 1 para. 1, § 4 para. 2 and § 5 of the Act on the Termination of Pregnancy were repealed.

The Act ceased to apply in full in 1993 following the decision of the Federal Constitutional Court to reorganize the legal situation on abortion throughout Germany.

According to the preamble of the law on the interruption of pregnancy, which consisted of five paragraphs, the possibility of deciding on pregnancy and carrying it to term was regarded as a requirement of the "equal rights of women in education and work, marriage and family" and thus as a contribution to achieving this goal within the framework of the women's and family policy of the GDR. According to Section 1 (1), women were therefore given "in addition to the existing contraceptive options, the right to decide on the interruption of a pregnancy on their own responsibility" in order to determine the number, the time and the chronological order of births.

According to Section 1 (2), a pregnant woman was entitled to have the pregnancy terminated within twelve weeks of its onset "by means of a medical intervention in an obstetric-gynecological facility". According to Section 1 (3), the doctor involved was obliged to "inform the woman of the medical significance of the procedure and advise her on the future use of contraceptive methods and means".

According to Section 2, the termination of a pregnancy of more than twelve weeks was subject to the decision of a commission of medical specialists and was only permitted if the woman's life was at risk or if there were other serious circumstances.

According to Section 3 (1), abortion was not permitted if the woman was suffering from an illness that could lead to serious health-threatening or life-threatening complications.

According to Section 3(2), abortion was inadmissible if the last abortion had taken place less than six months previously, unless the Medical Specialists Commission granted an exemption.

According to Section 4 (1), the preparation, execution and follow-up treatment of a permissible abortion were "treated in the same way as a case of illness in terms of employment and insurance law".

In addition, Section 4(2) of the Act provided for the free provision of medically prescribed contraceptives to women on social security.

The provisions on the entry into force of the Act and its effect on other laws, in particular the repeal of the previous restrictions on the permissibility of abortion, were contained in Section 5.

== Reactions ==
=== Reactions in the GDR ===
The joint decision of the GDR Council of Ministers and the Politburo of the Central Committee of the Socialist Unity Party on the planned law, announced on December 23, 1971, came unexpectedly, and there was hardly any public discussion beforehand or afterwards. Representatives of both confessions of the churches in the GDR expressed their rejection of the law even before it was passed. In a pastoral letter read from all pulpits on January 9, 1972, the Catholic Church emphasized that it was the task of every state to provide special protection for developing life. The eight Protestant bishops in the GDR expressed their "deepest dismay" and their rejection of the proposed law in a "Word of the Bishops of the Protestant Regional Churches in the GDR" published a few days later, which was addressed in particular to the individual members of the churches and "to all who want to hear it". Protest also came from free church groups such as the Seventh-day Adventists, whose community published a corresponding statement and distributed it in their congregations.

There was also criticism from doctors and members of the Socialist Unity Party of Germany (SED), but this did not spread to the general public. Helmut Kraatz, one of the most important gynecologists in the GDR, expressed a positive opinion of the new regulation, as it "removed the ground from the hands of medical practitioners", but also described abortion as the "most unpleasant method of family planning for women and gynecologists".

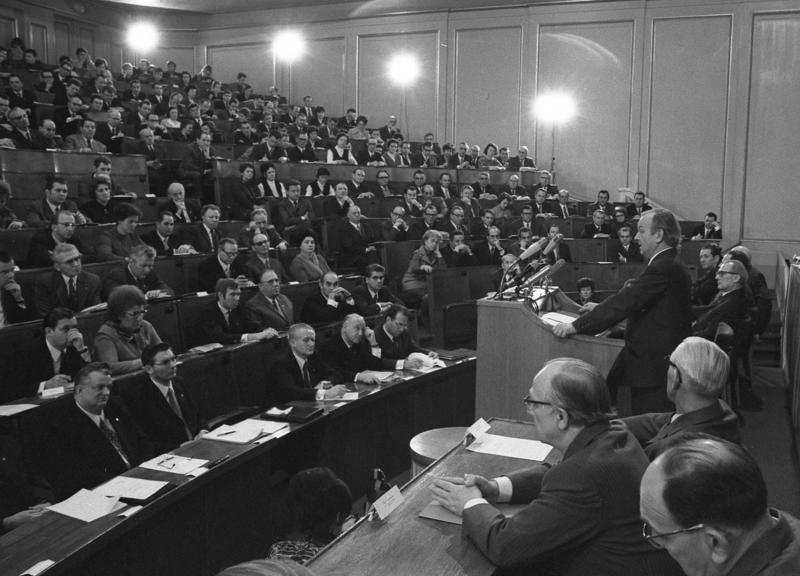
View of the plenary session of the Volkskammer during the session on March 9, 1972

The draft law on the interruption of pregnancy was the result of joint deliberations by the Constitutional and Legal Committee, the Committee for Health Care and the Committee for Labor and Social Policy of the People's Chamber. During the vote in the People's Chamber on March 9, 1972, which took place by a show of hands,[24] after speeches by the President of the People's Chamber, Gerald Götting, the Minister for Health Care, Ludwig Mecklinger, and Hildegard Heine from the Committee for Health Care, the bill was passed. March 1972, following speeches by the President of the Volkskammer, Gerald Götting, the Minister of Health, Ludwig Mecklinger, and Hildegard Heine, a member of the Health Committee, the result was not unanimous for the first and only time before the political change in 1989; 14 members of the Christian Democratic Union of Germany - around a quarter of the parliamentary group - voted against the law and eight members abstained. The proportion of votes against was less than three percent of the total number of representatives in the Volkskammer, which was elected through a single list of the National Front with a fixed distribution of seats. The inconsistent opinions within the CDU on the proposed law and the planned divergent voting behavior of the deputies concerned were known to the party leadership around its chairman Gerald Götting in advance and were communicated to the SED leadership via Albert Norden, a member of the Politburo of the SED Central Committee, around a month before the resolution was passed. Accordingly, Health Minister Ludwig Mecklinger, a member of the SED, also addressed the concerns of church circles in his comments on the law.

Previously, there had been isolated opposing votes in local parliaments in the GDR, such as the demolition of the ruins of the Potsdam Garrison Church and the demolition of the Leipzig University Church in 1968. The CDU did not make an official statement on the law or the behavior of its representatives; the non-unanimous result was welcomed by church officials of both denominations. In the reporting of Neues Deutschland, the most important daily newspaper in the GDR as the nationwide central organ of the SED, the outcome of the vote was described as an "absolute majority" and it was emphasized that "the rights and dignity of women were fully guaranteed". The SED used the result for propaganda purposes to upgrade the Volkskammer and as proof of the freedom that the members of parliament would have when casting their votes, especially for all other unanimous decisions. The state authorities subsequently tolerated the refusal to perform abortions in the GDR's existing hospitals run by Catholics or Protestants. However, the Catholic hospital in Heiligenstadt in the Catholic-dominated Eichsfeld region had to hand over its gynecology department to a state clinic, as there would otherwise have been no possibility of abortion in the town. An organized right-to-life movement did not exist in the GDR; corresponding protest activities remained marginal and limited to individuals, especially Christians in social and medical professions.

=== Reception in the Federal Republic of Germany ===
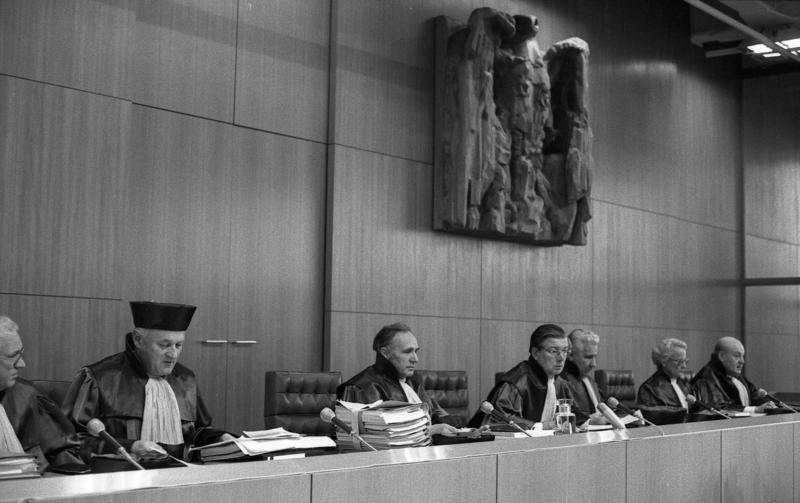
The Federal Constitutional Court hears the decision of the social-liberal coalition in favor of a solution to the term limit, 1974.

The law on the interruption of pregnancy and, in particular, the result of the vote in the Volkskammer also met with great interest in the West German media. For example, the Frankfurter Allgemeine Zeitung (FAZ) reported on the day after the vote under the headline "Dead silence in the Volkskammer. No votes in the plenary chamber for the first time". The comments on the significance of the vote varied. While the Süddeutsche Zeitung described it as a "remarkable event" that might have to lead to a distortion of the prevailing image of the Volkskammer in the Federal Republic as an "approval machine of the SED", the FAZ suspected that the voting behavior of the dissenting CDU representatives had been carried out in agreement with the SED. [33] The Evangelical Press Service regarded the admission of the no votes as a sign that the GDR would approve abortion but not propagate it.

The new version of the legislation on abortion in the GDR also put pressure on the social-liberal coalition under Chancellor Willy Brandt and Justice Minister Gerhard Jahn in the Federal Republic of Germany in their efforts to reform Section 218 StGB. This led to the adoption in June 1974 of a solution comparable to the new legal situation in the GDR, replacing the originally planned limited indication regulation. However, following a constitutional complaint by members of the CDU/CSU parliamentary group and five state governments, the new regulation was declared unconstitutional by the Federal Constitutional Court in February of the following year and replaced in June 1976 by a model with four different indications, in which the social indication was newly included in addition to the previously permitted exceptions. After German reunification, the Act on Education, Contraception, Family Planning and Counselling of July 27, 1992 introduced a time limit regulation with mandatory counselling and indications as a new nationwide regulation of the legal provisions on abortion, which represented a compromise between the time limit solution of the GDR and the indication model in the Federal Republic. Following an objection by the Federal Constitutional Court, this amendment came into force in 1993 in a modified form and was finally amended by the legislature in 1995.

== Consequences ==
The number of authorized abortions in the GDR, which had been 860 in 1962 and thus three years before the 1950 extension of the indication regulation, initially rose significantly to around 119,000 in 1972 immediately after the introduction of the deadline solution, but had already fallen again to around 83,000 by 1976. In contrast, before the new regulation, 70 to 80 women per year died as a result of improperly performed abortions. Immediately after the law was passed, hospitals in the GDR were often overwhelmed due to insufficient equipment; in the Women's Clinic of the Charité in Berlin, for example, the procedure was initially performed in several shifts. In later years, almost all hospitals in the GDR had special departments for performing abortions. The increase in abortions caused by the new regulations and the free distribution of contraceptives introduced at the same time led to a persistent population decline in the GDR until the end of the 1970s due to the resulting loss of births and had a corresponding effect on the age structure in the following years.

As a result of this development, a series of birth-promoting social policy measures were adopted by the state from the early 1970s, partly at the same time as the law on interrupting pregnancy, which included in particular regulations to improve the situation of families with children and working mothers. These included, for example, subsidized rents for low-income families, reduced weekly working hours with full pay and a higher leave entitlement for women with at least three children, the extension of paid leave after a birth from two to three months and, for young married couples, the introduction of an interest-free loan of 5,000 marks with a long term, the repayment of which was reduced when children were born. From the beginning of the 1980s, the number of births again exceeded the number of deaths; around 74,000 abortions were carried out in 1990. Due to a higher birth rate compared to the Federal Republic, the number of abortions in relation to pregnancies carried to term was comparable in both countries at the end of the 1980s, with around three births per abortion.

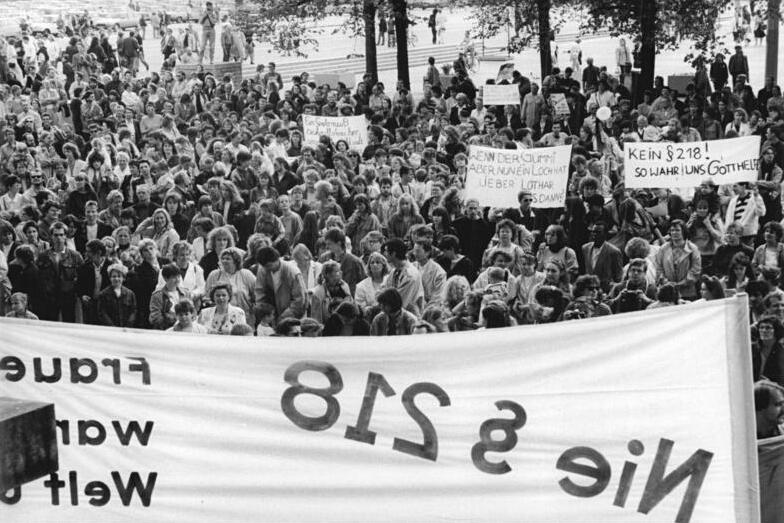
Demonstration in Berlin against § 218 of the German Criminal Code in April 1990

After the political change in the GDR, the "right to self-determined pregnancy" was included in the Round Table's draft for a new GDR constitution. For the newly formed Independent Women's Association, which ran in the Volkskammer elections in March 1990 in an electoral alliance with the East German Green Party, the retention of the current regulation on the time limit was a decisive issue. On the one hand, the CDU campaigned on the basis of the rejectionist stance of its 14 MPs in the 1972 vote, but also stated in its election manifesto that "abortion bans and threats of punishment ... are not an aid to life". With the exception of the newly founded German Social Union (DSU), politicians from all parties represented in the newly elected Volkskammer, including the CDU, supported the retention of the abortion ban, which was also included as a demand in the coalition agreement of the newly formed government consisting of the CDU-led electoral coalition Alliance for Germany, the SPD and the liberal Association of Free Democrats. Kurt Wünsche from the Liberal Democratic Party of Germany (LDPD), who served as GDR Minister of Justice from January to August 1990 under Prime Ministers Hans Modrow and Lothar de Maizière, suggested that the right to abortion should be included in a new all-German constitution[44] or that different legal situations should continue to exist.

In February 2008, Wolfgang Böhmer, then Prime Minister of Saxony-Anhalt and, during the GDR era, head of gynecology at a Protestant hospital in Wittenberg, triggered a controversial public debate on the late effects of the 1972 law by linking the legal situation on abortions in the GDR with a "frivolous attitude towards developing life" and infanticide in the new federal states in the news magazine Focus. His statements on the connection between abortions in the GDR and the frequency of infanticide in East Germany, which he qualified a few days later in an interview in the newspaper Die Welt, were largely rejected by politicians of all parties. However, there were also different comments from psychiatrists and political scientists as well as approval from some affected women, church representatives and pro-life initiatives such as the CDU organization Christian Democrats for Life with regard to his statements on the GDR legislation on abortion.

== Bibliography ==
- Thietz, Kirsten (1992). Ende der Selbstverständlichkeit? Die Abschaffung des § 218 in der DDR. Dokumente. Berlin: Basis Druck Verlag. ISBN 3861630133.
- Judt, Matthias, ed. (1997). "G58: Gesetz über die Unterbrechung der Schwangerschaft. 1972.". DDR-Geschichte in Dokumenten. Beschlüsse, Berichte, interne Materialien und Alltagszeugnisse. Forschungen zur DDR-Gesellschaft. Berlin: Ch. Links Verlag. pp. 210–211. ISBN 3861531429.
- Schwartz, Michael (2008). "»Liberaler als bei uns?« Zwei Fristenregelungen und die Folgen. Reformen des Abtreibungsstrafrechts in Deutschland". In Wengst, Udo; Wentker, Hermann (eds.). Das doppelte Deutschland: 40 Jahre Systemkonkurrenz. Schriftenreihe der Bundeszentrale für Politische Bildung. Vol. 720. Berlin: Ch. Links Verlag. pp. 183–212. ISBN 3861534819.

== Related publications ==
- Mahrad, Christa (1987). Schwangerschaftsabbruch in der DDR: Gesellschaftliche, ethische und demographische Aspekte. Europäische Hochschulschriften. Serie XXXI: Politikwissenschaft. Vol. 111. Frankfurt am Main: Verlag Peter Lang. ISBN 3820402519.
