= The Murderers Are Among Us =

1946 film by Wolfgang Staudte

The Murderers Are Among Us (UK) Murderers Among Us (US) Die Mörder sind unter uns (Germany)
- German movie poster
- Directed by: Wolfgang Staudte
- Written by: Wolfgang Staudte
- Produced by: DEFA
- Starring: Ernst Wilhelm Borchert; Hildegard Knef; Arno Paulsen; Erna Sellmer
- Cinematography: Friedl Behn-Grund; Eugen Klagemann
- Edited by: Hans Heinrich
- Music by: Ernst Roters
- Release date: 15 October 1946
- Running time: 91 minutes
- Country: Germany
- Language: German

Die Mörder sind unter uns, a German film known in English as Murderers Among Us in the United States or The Murderers Are Among Us in the United Kingdom was one of the first post-World War II German films and the first Trümmerfilm. It was produced in 1945/46 in the Althoff Studios in Babelsberg and the Jofa-Ateliers in Johannisthal. The film was written and directed by Wolfgang Staudte.

== Plot ==
In Berlin in 1945, after Germany's defeat in World War II, former military surgeon Dr. Hans Mertens (Ernst Wilhelm Borchert) stumbles down the street, drunk. He suffers from flashbacks of the war and has an aversion to people in pain, which prevents him from practicing medicine. Instead, he spends his days drinking. An artist and Nazi concentration camp survivor, Susanne Wallner (Hildegard Knef), finds him living in her apartment as she returns home.

They reluctantly share the space at first, then become friends. Susanne finds a letter to a Mrs. Brückner in the apartment and confronts Mertens about it. Mertens tries to get a job at a hospital, but a screaming woman gives him flashbacks and he is left incapacitated. Meanwhile, Susanne finds a battlefield "farewell" letter entrusted to Mertens, to be mailed upon the man's death, which he never sent. On her own she decides to deliver the letter to his widow, discovering instead the man, Ferdinand Brückner (Arno Paulsen), is not only alive but prospering. When Mertens returns, Susanne informs him of it all. Rather than being grateful his former Captain is well he is distressed.

Mertens visits Brückner, and stays for dinner. Brückner has become a successful businessman, producing pots out of old Stahlhelme, the German military steel helmet. After the dinner, Brückner returns to Mertens his gun from the war, which, gravely wounded, he had requested from him to commit suicide in the face of imminent capture. Mertens has another flashback and goes home drunk.

Soon after, Mertens decides to kill Brückner. He leads Brückner away under the pretense of going to a bar and takes him along a purportedly shorter route, through the rubble and abandoned buildings of Berlin. When he thinks they are alone, he draws his gun. As he does so, a woman in need of a doctor runs out of one of the ruined buildings. Brückner tells her that Mertens is a doctor, but Mertens is reluctant to help. The woman tells him her only child began to struggle breathing an hour before, and he goes along with her, while Brückner leaves for the bar alone. Mertens performs a successful tracheotomy on the girl while Brückner lives it up with the showgirls. Liberated from his demons by his ability to once-again successfully contribute to life-saving, Mertens returns home and proclaims his love for Susanne.

The film skips forward to Christmas Eve. Susanne and Mertens are still living together, and Mertens is now a practicing surgeon. Mertens tells Susanne he has to finish something. He goes to Brückner's factory, where Brückner and his employees are singing Christmas carols. Mertens has a flashback, which reveals that Brückner had ordered the execution of some 120 villagers in Poland, including 31 children, over Mertens' objections, on Christmas Eve of 1942. Mertens tries to kill Brückner again, but Susanne stops him at the last minute. Instead, they denounce Brückner to the authorities and he is put on trial for war crimes.

== Cast ==
- Ernst Wilhelm Borchert (as W. Borchert) - Dr. Hans Mertens
- Hildegard Knef - Susanne Wallner
- Arno Paulsen - Ferdinand Brückner
- Erna Sellmer - Elise Brückner
- Robert Forsch - Herr Mondschein

== Filming ==
Staudte had sought permission to make the film from British, French, and Americans authorities, three of the four powers empowered to administer Berlin after the war, but was rejected by all because of its political nature. The last, the Soviets, accepted the script with a change to the film's planned ending, which had Mertens succeeding in killing Brückner. Afraid viewers could interpret as a call for vigilante justice, they preferred condemnation to the authorities and prosecution, as the film was made. Thus Der Mann den ich töten werde (The Man I Will Kill) became, and was retitled, Mörder unter uns (Murderer Among Us), an homage to Fritz Lang's 1931 classic M.

The film debuted on 15 October 1946 in the Admiralspalast, which was at the time the home of the Berlin State Opera, in the Soviet sector. The television debut in the German Democratic Republic (East Germany) was on 1 November 1955 and in the Federal Republic (West Germany) on 18 November 1971.

== Denazification ==
In the post-war period, it was a goal of both the American and the Soviet authorities to denazify Germany. Key to this was re-educating its people. For the Americans, this included exporting American films to West Germany; for the Soviets, it resulted in the establishment of DEFA film studio in Berlin. With The Murderers Are Among Us, the aim was to urge the public to judge those responsible for the atrocities committed during the war. Angel Wagenstein, a Bulgarian director, said, “For me [Staudte] was the first ambassador, who through his film renewed our faith in a nation capable of self-reflection, of looking into the mirror and acknowledging its own guilt, of making a confession that very few nations would be able to make.”

Leading male player, Ernst Wilhelm Borchert, was removed from advertisements for the movie because he had been accused and arrested for lying on denazification paperwork, but an article published in the Neue Zeit in 1947 later reported that he'd been exonerated by the Denazification Commission for Artists.

Another element of denazification was creating a new German culture. Post-war period German cinema employed different film styles as a means. The Murderers Are Among Us draws mainly on the Western film and the domestic melodrama. The movie adopts certain features of the classic Western film, while also giving them a unique twist. Hans, although presented as a Western hero, is an atypical one, as he does not give in to vengeance at the end of the movie. Instead, it advances the goal of restoring order through the redemptive character of Susanne and her effort to establish a household for Hans, cure his precarious emotional state, and re-integrate him in society.

The tension in postwar Germany generated by establishing a new society and culture while also coming to terms with its Nazi past is addressed in The Murderers Are Among Us, revealing much about the politics of the past in early postwar German culture, and earning it the plaudit of being “an often overlooked cinematic legacy”.

== Reception ==
=== Box office ===
The picture sold 6,468,921 tickets.

=== Critical reception ===
Most of the reviews were positive, although some criticized the fact that the characters appeared in modern and trendy clothes, which did not reflect the reality of the living conditions of Berliners in the immediate post-war period. In this film, Staudte was not only dealing with Germany's past, but also with his own, as he had been involved in the filming of the Nazi propaganda film Jud Süß.

== See also ==
- Cinema of Germany
