= Abortion in Germany =

Abortion in Germany is illegal except to save the life of the mother but is nonpunishable during the first 12 weeks of pregnancy upon condition of mandatory counseling. The same goes later in pregnancy in cases that the pregnancy poses an important danger to the physical or mental health of the pregnant woman. In the case that the abortion is because of a rape, counseling is not mandatory. The woman needs to receive counseling, called Schwangerschaftskonfliktberatung ("pregnancy-conflict counseling"), at least three days prior to the abortion and must take place at a state-approved centre, which afterwards gives the applicant a Beratungsschein ("certificate of counseling").

Doctors provide medication to cause the abortion, and observe to ensure there are no negative reactions to the medication.

== History ==
=== Early ===
Abortion legislation was codified in item 133 of the Constitutio Criminalis Carolina (1532). Later were particular laws in Germany, e.g. in Prussia part 2 title 20 section 986-990 of General State Laws for the Prussian States (1794). 1851 it was codified in sections 181 and 182 of the Penal Code for Prussia, which formed the basis for the Penal Code of the North German Federation (1870). On 15 May 1871, following the Proclamation of the German Empire, the latter code was incorporated into sections 218–220 of the Penal Code for the German Reich (Strafgesetzbuch), taking effect on 1 January 1872. Section 218 outlawed abortion, requiring a penal term for the woman and any involved person. Legalization of abortion was first widely discussed in Germany during the early 20th century. During the Weimar Republic, such discussion led 1926 to a reduction in the penalty for abortion, and in 1927 a court's decision – similar to the United Kingdom decision R v Bourne – decriminalized abortion in cases of grave danger to the life of the mother.

=== Nazi era ===
Nazi Germany's eugenics laws severely punished abortion for women belonging to the "Aryan race", but permitted abortion on wider and more explicit grounds than before if the fetus was believed to be deformed or disabled or if termination otherwise was deemed desirable on eugenic grounds, such as the child or either parent suspected of being carrier of a genetic disease. Sterilization of the parents also took place in some such cases. In cases where the parents were Jewish, abortion was also not punished.

The severest abortion prohibitions were incorporated into law on 9 March 1943. Section 218 stated that "a woman who kills her fetus or permits such a killing by another will be punished by a prison sentence and, in especially serious cases, by penitentiary. An attempt is punishable. Whoever else kills the fetus of a pregnant woman will be punished by a penitentiary sentence, in milder cases by prison. If the perpetrator through such deeds continuously impairs the vitality of the German nation, the death penalty is imposed. Whoever procures for the pregnant woman a means or objects for killing the fetus will be punished by prison sentence, and in especially serious cases, by penitentiary". During World War II, abortion policy in Nazi Germany varied depending on the people group and territory the policy was directed at. The commonality between policies was its purpose in promoting the birth rate and population of the "Aryan race" and minimizing the population of others (such as Slavs), and those deemed a burden on German society such as the children of disabled and mentally ill persons. Forced abortions of Ostarbeiter for instance was referenced in documents from the Trials of War Criminals Before the Nuremberg Military Tribunals. It has been categorized as a part of Nazi Germany's "systematic program of genocide, aimed at the destruction of foreign nations and ethnic groups".

While abortion had been punished by the law in Poland previously, under Nazi occupation these prohibitions were removed and abortion was instead encouraged subject to whether the child had a German father or could be racially "Germanized." Similarly, the policy for Eastern female workers, was that pregnancy may be "interrupted" if the pregnant woman so "desired" which gave the appearance of consent on behalf of the mother. For pregnancies of non-German woman, whether an abortion would be permitted also depended on the mother's nationality, but primarily turned on whether the father was German or if the mother was of a race that could be "Germanized." If the child was deemed to be of a race that could contribute to the German race and the father was German then an abortion, or as described in Nazi documents an "interruption of pregnancy," would likely not be permitted. Such determinations were made by the Race and Settlement Main Office (RuSHA)– who would determine the fate of the child.

=== Post-war ===
After World War II, abortion remained broadly illegal throughout both German states: West Germany reinstated the legal situation of 1927. The legal requirements in the West were extremely strict, and often led women to seek abortions elsewhere, particularly in the Netherlands. It has been estimated that about 2 million women had abortions each year between 1945 and 1948, mostly in the Soviet zone. Most of these terminations were the result of rape committed by the Soviet Army. An abortion cost around 1,000 marks and was performed without anaesthesia. 6000 Berlin women died each year in the Soviet zone from resulting complications. All East German states, except Saxony-Anhalt, allowed abortion for social reasons in 1947 and 1948. Because this went against the SED's population growth policy, access to abortions was severely restricted in 1950 with the official motivation of 'protecting mothers and children' and 'for women's rights.' The 1950 abortion law promoted large families. Terminations of pregnancy were only allowed if the mother's health were endangered or if the father or mother suffered from a hereditary disease.

On 6 June 1971, the cover of the West German magazine Stern ran with the headline "We've had abortions!" (German: Wir haben abgetrieben!), and featured the pictures of 30 women who had done so. 374 women, some, but not all, of whom had a high public profile, publicly confessed that they had had pregnancies terminated, which at that time was illegal. They challenged §218 and asserted their right to abortion. In the years following publication, several of the participants admitted they had not actually had an abortion, including Alice Schwarzer, who stated that it was irrelevant, because "we would have done it if we'd had an unwanted pregnancy."

East Germany legalized elective abortion until 12 weeks of pregnancy in 1972, in the Volkskammer's only non-unanimous vote ever in the first 40 years of its existence. After West Germany followed suit in 1974, its new law was struck down in 1975 by the Constitutional Court as inconsistent with the human rights guarantee of the constitution. It held that the unborn has a right to life, that abortion is an act of killing, and that the fetus deserves legal protection throughout its development. Nevertheless, the legal opinion strongly hinted that increasing the number of situations in which abortion was legal might be constitutional.

In East Germany, female Vertragsarbeiter (foreign workers) were not allowed to become pregnant during their stay. If they did, they were forced to have an abortion or faced deportation.

In 1976, West Germany revised abortion law. According to the new modifications to §218, penalties for abortions are not enforced on doctors and patients when several conditions are met: terminations must be no later than twelve weeks of pregnancy – or must be performed for reasons of medical necessity, sexual crimes, or serious social or emotional distress – if approved by two doctors, and subject to counseling and a three-day waiting period. In 1989, a Bavarian doctor was sentenced to two and a half years in prison, and 137 of his patients were fined for failing to meet the certification requirements.

The two laws had to be reconciled after reunification. A new law was passed by the Bundestag in 1992, permitting first-trimester elective abortion, subject to counseling and a three-day waiting period, and permitting late-term abortions when the physical or psychological health of the woman is seriously threatened. The law was quickly challenged in court by a number of individuals – including Chancellor Helmut Kohl – and by the State of Bavaria. The Constitutional Court decided a year later to maintain its earlier decision that the constitution protected the fetus from the moment of conception, but stated that it is within the discretion of parliament not to punish abortion in the first trimester, provided that the woman had submitted to state-regulated counseling intended to discourage termination and protect fetal life. Parliament passed such a law in 1995. Abortions are covered by public health insurance if the pregnancy was caused by sexual abuse, such as rape, or if the mother's health is seriously endangered by the pregnancy. For women with low income, the state governments pay for an abortion.

In 2022, the Olaf Scholz coalition of social democrats, greens, and liberals, repealed paragraph 219a, together with votes from The Left. This allowed medical professionals to state on their websites what kinds of abortion procedures they offer.

== Statistics ==
Year	1996	2001	2006	2011	2012	2013	2014	2015	2016	2017	2018	2019	2020	2021	2022
Total abortions	130,899	134,964	119,710	108,867	106,815	102,802	99,715	99,237	98,721	101,209	100,986	100,893	99,948	94,596	103,927
Live births	796,013	734,475	672,724	662,685	673,544	682,069	714,927	737,575	792,141	784,901	787,523	778,090	773,144	795,492	738,856
Abortions per 1,000 births (live)	164.4	183.8	177.9	164.3	158.6	150.7	139.5	134.5	124.6	128.9	128.2	129.7	129.3	118.9	140.7
Abortions per 1,000 women (15–44 years)	7.65	8.04	7.42	7.52	7.45	7.23	7.05	6.98	6.96	7.13	7.10	7.08	7.03	6.65	7.15
Number of women (15–44 years) in Tsd.	17,109	16,783	16,133	14,480	14,337	14,216	14,146	14,215	14,182	14,188	14,222	14,240	14,212	14,215	14,545
by marital status:
Single	53,195	62,806	61,919	61,654	60,993	58,810	57,584	57,234	56,069	57,294	58,366	58,070	57,814	55,059	60,602
Married	68,524	63,686	51,119	42,153	40,742	39,355	37,628	37,659	38,529	39,669	38,712	38,727	38,286	35,961	39,656
Widowed	760	555	382	207	222	213	195	228	214	188	174	198	182	182	199
Divorced	8,420	7,917	6,290	4,853	4,858	4,424	4,308	4,116	3,909	4,058	3,734	3,898	3,666	3,394	3,470

Abortion-numbers had been falling over the last 25 years, there were 130,000–135,000 per year between 1996 and 2002, but this had fallen to a low of fewer than 99,000 abortions in 2016 and since then stabilized at around 100,000 abortions yearly.

As of 2018, the abortion rate was 129 abortions per 1,000 live births.

== Legislation ==
Abortion is illegal under Section 218 of the German criminal code, and punishable by up to three years in prison (or up to five years for "reckless" abortions or those against the pregnant woman's will). Section 218a of the German criminal code, called Exception to liability for abortion, makes an exception for abortions with counseling in the first trimester, and for medically necessary abortions and abortions due to unlawful sexual acts (such as sexual abuse of a minor or rape) thereafter.

All abortions in Germany must be performed by a medical doctor.
