= Max Sefrin =

East German politician (1913–2000)

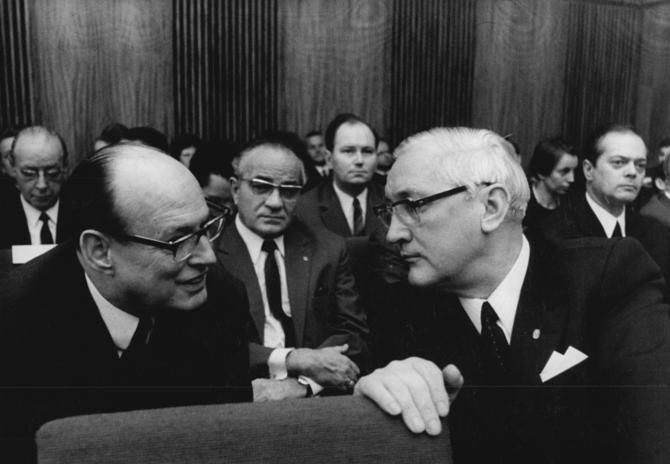
- Sefrin (right) in 1970

Minister of Health
- In office 8 December 1958 – 29 November 1971
- Chairman of the Council of Ministers: Otto Grotewohl; Willi Stoph
- Preceded by: Luitpold Steidle
- Succeeded by: Ludwig Mecklinger

Personal details
- Born: 21 November 1913 Stambach, Palatinate, German Empire
- Died: 10 August 2000 (aged 86)
- Party: Christian Democratic Union (East Germany) (1946–1990)

Max Sefrin (21 November 1913 – 10 August 2000) was an East German politician who served as the minister of health and deputy premier. He was also one of the leaders of the Christian Democratic Union (CDU) in East Germany.

== Early life and education ==
Sefrin was born in Stambach, Palatinate, on 21 November 1913. Between 1930 and 1932 he received training on commercial apprenticeship and involved in business. In the early 1950s he attended the German Academy for Political Science and Law in Babelsberg.

== Career and activities ==
In 1946 Sefrin joined the CDU in East Germany and continued his business activities until 1950. He became a member of the Free German Trade Union Federation of which he was a district councilor in Luckenwalde in the period between 1950 and 1951. From 1951 he began to assume several posts in the CDU, including deputy general secretary under Gerald Götting. On 25 September 1954 Sefrin joined its executive board. He was named deputy chairman of the council of ministers in February 1958. Sefrin was elected to the National Front in September 1958.

In December 1958 Sefrin was appointed minister of health succeeding Luitpold Steidle in the post. Sefrin remained in office until 1971 when he was replaced by Ludwig Mecklinger in the post.

== Death ==
Sefrin died on 10 August 2000.
