= Ludwig Mecklinger =

East German politician (1919–1994)

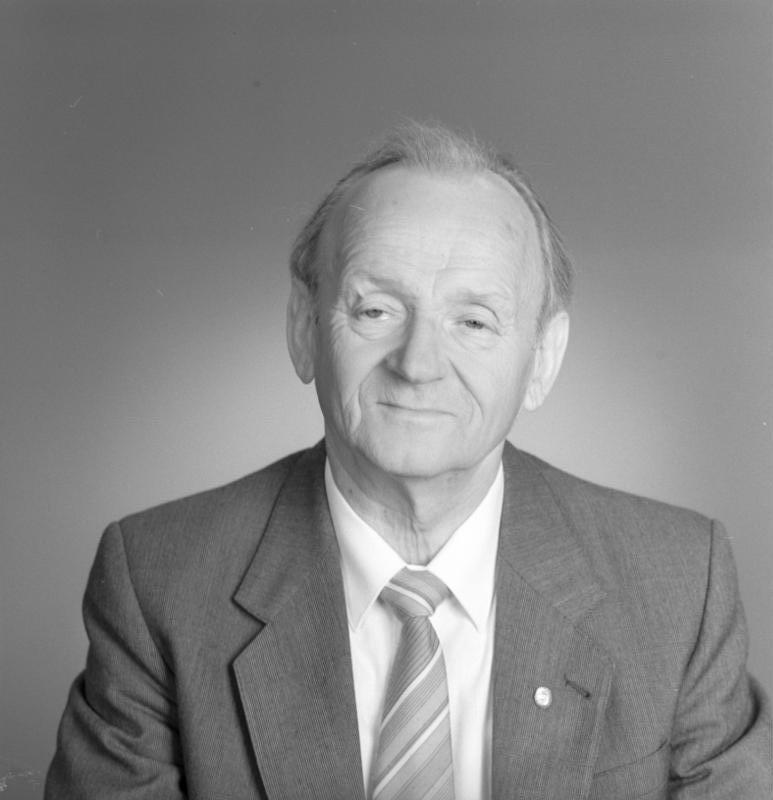
- Mecklinger in 1986

Minister of Health
- In office 29 November 1971 – 27 January 1989
- Chairman of the Council of Ministers: Willi Stoph; Horst Sindermann; Willi Stoph
- Preceded by: Max Sefrin
- Succeeded by: Klaus Thielmann
Volkskammer
Member of the Volkskammer for Eisenach, Gotha
In office 25 June 1981 – 5 April 1990
Preceded by	Alois Bräutigam
Succeeded by	Constituency abolished

Personal details
- Born: 14 November 1919 Buchdorf, Bavaria, Weimar Republic (now Germany)
- Died: 22 June 1994 (aged 74) Berlin, Germany
- Party: Socialist Unity Party (1946–1989)
- Other political affiliations: Communist Party of Germany (1945–1946)
- Education: Leipzig University; University of Hamburg; Humboldt University of Berlin; Deutsche Akademie für Staats- und Rechtswissenschaft „Walter Ulbricht“ (Dipl.-Jur.)
- Awards: Patriotic Order of Merit, 1st class
- Central institution membership: 1986–1989: Full member, Central Committee; 1976–1986: Candidate member, Central Committee; Other offices held: 1969–1971: First Deputy Minister, Ministry of Health; 1964–1969: Deputy Minister, Ministry of Health

Ludwig Mecklinger (14 November 1919 – 22 June 1994) was a German politician who was one of the health ministers of East Germany and a member of the ruling party Socialist Unity Party (SED). He had degrees both in medicine and law.

== Early life and education ==
Mecklinger was born in Buchdorf, near Donauwörth, on 14 November 1919. He studied medicine in Leipzig, Hamburg and Berlin in the period between 1939 and 1944. In 1944 he was drafted into the German army and was arrested by the American forces. He was detained in a war camp in Traunstein. In 1945 he was released and joined the SED. In 1954 he also obtained a degree in law from the German Academy for State and Law in Potsdam.

== Career ==
Between 1945 and 1947 Mecklinger was in the provincial government of Saxony-Anhalt responsible for disease control. Between 1948 and 1952 he served the minister of labor and health of the Land Saxony-Anhalt. In the period 1952–1954 he acted as the deputy chairman of the central committee of the German Red Cross. From 1954 to 1957 he was the deputy chief of the medical service of the Kasernierte Volkspolizei and then of the National People's Army. In 1957 he was named as the head of the military medical section at the University of Greifswald which he held until 1964. Mecklinger began to work for the Ministry for State Security or Stasi in 1962. In 1964 he was promoted to the professorship and was appointed deputy dean of the military medicine. The same year he was also named as the vice health minister.

In 1969 Mecklinger was appointed secretary of state and first vice health minister. In 1971 he was named as the health minister and replaced Max Sefrin in the post. Mecklinger was the first physician who held the office in East Germany. He served in the cabinet led by Willi Stoph and was in office until his resignation in 1989. Klaus Thiemann replaced Mecklinger as health minister. In the period 1981–1988 Mecklinger served as a deputy at the East German Parliament. Between 1986 and 1988 he was a member of the central committee of the SED.

== Awards ==
Mecklinger was the recipient of the bronze, silver and gold medals of the National People's Army and the gold medal for services to people and fatherland in 1974. In 1984 he was awarded with the Scharnhorst Order.

== Death and awards ==
He died in Berlin on 22 June 1994.

== See also ==
- Law on the interruption of pregnancy in the German Democratic Republic
