= Wilhelm Borchert =

German actor (1907–1990)

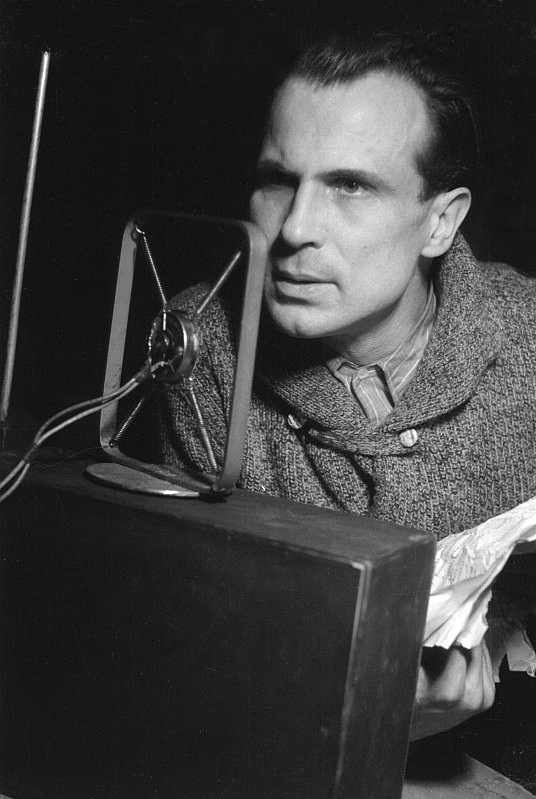
- Wilhelm Borchert in 1946
- Born: 13 March 1907; Rixdorf, German Empire
- Died: 1 June 1990 (aged 83); West Berlin, West Germany
- Occupation: Actor
- Years active: 1941–1976

Ernst Wilhelm Borchert, or just Wilhelm Borchert, (13 March 1907 in Rixdorf – 1 June 1990 in West Berlin) was a German actor. He was also a voice actor for audio books and films.

== Relationship to the Nazi Party ==
Borchert was a member of the Nazi Party beginning in 1933, and joined the Nazi SA stormtroopers in 1933-1934. In 1946, Borchert was arrested and shown to have hidden his Nazi Party membership during American denazification. Albert Johannes, who acted alongside Borchert in Die Mörder sind unter uns, testified that Borchert was "strictly opposed to the Nazis" and had protected Johannes's Jewish wife. Borchert was sentenced to twelve months imprisonment by the American military court, but immediately released from prison due to time served since Borchert's arrest.

In 1947, he was exonerated from the accusation of being an active member of the Nazi Party by the Denazification Commission for Artists in the Soviet sector.

== Theater ==
After graduating, Borchert pursued a degree in acting at the Reicherschen Hochschule für dramatische Kunst (Reicherschen School for dramatic arts) from 1926 to 1927.

For his talent in acting, Borchert became a Staatsschauspieler (Actor of the state) and an Honorary member of the State Theater of Berlin in 1973. He was also a member of the Akademie der Künste Berlin until 1976. Borchert equally impressed the public and critics in classic hero roles. He was the first to play Woyzeck after the war.

- 1948: Ben Jonson (Bearbeitet von Stefan Zweig): Volpone (Sohn) – Regie: Willi Schmidt (Deutsches Theater Berlin)
- 1948: William Shakespeare: Maß für Maß (Angelo) – Regie: Wolfgang Langhoff (Deutsches Theater Berlin – Kammerspiele)
- 1949: Lion Feuchtwanger: Wahn in Boston (Mathers Schwager) – Regie: Wolfgang Kühne (Deutsches Theater Berlin – Kammerspiele)
- 1949: Johann Wolfgang von Goethe: Faust I (Faust) – (Städtische Bühnen Magdeburg)
- 1949: Gotthold Ephraim Lessing: Nathan der Weise (Tempelherr) – Regie: Gerda Müller (Deutsches Theater Berlin)
- 1949: Johann Wolfgang von Goethe: Faust. Eine Tragödie. (Faust) – Regie: Wolfgang Langhoff (Deutsches Theater Berlin)
- 1949: Friedrich Wolf: Tai Yang erwacht (Führer der Revolutionäre) – Regie: Wolfgang Langhoff (Deutsches Theater Berlin) Film

== Films ==
- 1941: U-Boote westwärts!
- 1943: Der ewige Klang
- 1946: Die Mörder sind unter uns
- 1949: Schicksal aus zweiter Hand
- 1953: Die Wüste lebt (Erzählstimme)
- 1954: Sauerbruch – Das war mein Leben
- 1955: Master of Life and Death
- 1960: Die Botschafterin
- 1965: Willkommen in Altamont
- 1988: In einem Land vor unserer Zeit

== Dubbing ==
Next to theater Borchert worked between 1945 and 1989 as a dubbing actor. He replaced many actors voices, including:

- Eddie Albert (The Heartbreak Kid)
- Martin Balsam (Frau mit Vergangenheit)
- Julian Beck (Poltergeist II: The Other Side) (Reverend Henry Kane)
- Richard Burton (Cleopatra, The Longest Day and The V.I.P.s)
- Gary Cooper (Friendly Persuasion)
- Bing Crosby (Robin and the 7 Hoods)
- José Ferrer (The Caine Mutiny)
- Mel Ferrer (Engel der Gejagten)
- Henry Fonda (Once Upon a Time in the West and My Name is Nobody)
- John Gielgud (Arthur)
- Alec Guinness (Star Wars and The Bridge on the River Kwai)
- Rex Harrison (The Foxes of Harrow)
- Charlton Heston (Ben-Hur and Ten Commandments)
- Trevor Howard (Outcast of the Islands)
- Rock Hudson (Back to God's Country)
- Alan Ladd (Saskatchewan)
- Burt Lancaster (Judgment at Nuremberg)
- James Mason (Prince Valiant)
- Laurence Olivier (The Shoes of the Fisherman and Clash of the Titans)
- Peter O’Toole (The Lion in Winter)
- Ronald Reagan (The Killers)
- Edward G. Robinson (The Biggest Bundle of Them All)
- Max von Sydow (The Greatest Story Ever Told)
- John Wayne (She Wore a Yellow Ribbon)
- Johnny Weissmüller (Tarzan and the Mermaids)
- Orson Welles (The Roots of Heaven)
- Richard Widmark (Broken Lance).

== Audiobooks ==
He also voiced many audiobooks.

- 1948: Arnaud d’Usseau/James Gow: Tief sind die Wurzeln (Brett Charles) – Regie: Hans Küpper (Berliner Rundfunk)
- 1950: Jacques Roumain: Herr über den Tau – Regie: Hanns Farenburg (Berliner Rundfunk)
- 2004: Krieg der Sterne – Eine Neue Hoffnung, Episode 4, Das Hörspiel zum Kinofilm, Universal, ISBN 9783899457759
- 2004: Das Imperium Schlägt Zurück, Episode 5, Das Hörspiel zum Kinofilm, Universal, ISBN 9783899457773
- 2004: Die Rückkehr der Jedi Ritter, Episode 6, Das Hörspiel zum Kinofilm, Universal, ISBN 9783899457797

== Awards ==
- 1976: Berliner Kunstpreis
