= Luitpold Steidle =

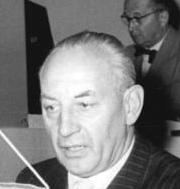
- Luitpold Steidle (1956)

Minister of Health of the German Democratic Republic
- In office 1949–1958
- Preceded by: position established
- Succeeded by: Max Sefrin

Mayor of Weimar
- In office 1960–1969
- Preceded by: Hans Wiedemann (politician)
- Succeeded by: Paul Ullmann

Member of the Volkskammer
- In office 1949–1971

Personal details
- Born: March 12, 1898 Ulm, Kingdom of Württemberg, German Empire
- Died: July 27, 1984 (aged 86) Weimar, Bezirk Erfurt, East Germany
- Party: Christian Democratic Union (1946-); Nazi Party (1933-1943)
- Spouse: Elisabeth Driessen (26 September 1922)
- Children: Ludger Steidle; Hiltrud Steidle
- Occupation: Politician; Army officer

Military service
- Allegiance: Nazi Germany (1934-1943); German Empire (1915-1918)
- Rank: Colonel (Nazi Germany); Lieutenant (German Empire)
- Battles/wars: Second World War; Eastern Front; Battle of Stalingrad; First World War

Luitpold Steidle (12 March 1898, in Ulm – 27 July 1984, in Weimar) was a German army officer and an East German politician. During his political career he belonged to the CDU.

He was described by Der Spiegel in 1947 as a "refreshingly open-minded man with a narrow distinctive face, in his late 40s".

== Life ==
In 1898 Luitpold Steidle was born into a Catholic family in Ulm, in the Kingdom of Württemberg, which less than thirty years earlier had been incorporated into the German Empire. His father was a senior military judge.

He attended secondary school in Munich before joining the army in 1915. By the end of the war he had reached the rank of lieutenant. He immediately resumed his education, from 1918 attending what was then known as the Technical High School (College) in Munich, where he studied Agricultural sciences. However, he then switched to a more hands-on training. He learned farming at Hohenpolding and at Grasselfing (Olching), both located a short distance to the west of Munich.

In 1922 he set himself up as an independent farmer in Loibersdorf (Aying), between Munich and Rosenheim. In 1926 he took a job as a merchandise inspector, and in 1928 as a stud-inspector near Kassel, in Beberbeck, one of the country's leading stud centres. However, with the steady increase in mechanised agriculture and the general economic decline the stud business was itself under pressure and the principal stud at Beberbeck business went into liquidation in 1929, even though business activity did not come to an immediate halt. On 1 May 1933 Steidle joined the Nazi Party which had seized power in January 1933 and spent the intervening months consolidating its own power and banning other political parties in Germany. He lost his job in 1933 and a period of unemployment followed. He worked briefly as an insurance agent during 1934 before rejoining the army at the end of the year, recovering immediately the officer's rank that he had held when decommissioned in 1918.

He was promoted to the rank of colonel in 1942 and sent to fight on the Russian front as a regimental commander. In 1943 he was caught up in the Battle of Stalingrad. He survived, but was taken prisoner of war by the Soviets. While in captivity he was a founder member of the German Officers' League (BDO / Bund Deutscher Offiziere), an organisation created under the presidency of Walther von Seydlitz to promote an accommodation between the Soviet Union and Germany in order to avoid the destruction of the latter after further bloodshed. Understandably, the BDO enjoyed the support of their Soviet captors. One precondition for the BDO's objective to have become a realistic proposition would have been the successful removal from power of Adolf Hitler. This did not happen for another two years. In the meanwhile, as the BDO's Vice-president (and one of its most persuasive speakers) Luitpold Steidle was sentenced to death in absentia by the German state, as he describes in the volume of his memoirs that covers this period.

Till the end of the war, during his time in Soviet detention, Steidle served as representative of the National Committee for a Free Germany. When he returned to what had been Germany, it was to the part that had become the Soviet Occupation Zone (SBZ / Sowjetische Besatzungszone), and was beginning the transformation into the stand-alone state, East Germany. After the war, between 1945 and 1948, Steidle was vice-president of the German Agriculture and Forestry Division in the SBZ. In 1946, as a Roman Catholic, he joined the Christian Democratic Union (CDU / Christlich-Demokratische Union Deutschlands) in East Germany, although it was already becoming apparent that for the foreseeable future the CDU, like the country in which it operated, was destined to operate separately from its West German namesake. Between 1948 and 1949 he took over as deputy chairman of the German Economic Commission in the SBZ/East Germany.

In October 1949 Steidle was elected/nominated to the Provisional People's Chamber (Volkskammer). He remained a member of the (after 1950 no longer "provisional") (Volkskammer) till 1971. He held office from 1949 till 1950 as Minister for Work and Health, and from 1950 till 1958 as Minister for Health. He also provided advice on the creation of the National People's Army (NVA / Nationale Volksarmee), established in 1956 (following a period during which the wartime allies, including the Soviet Union, had agreed that permitting Germany an army was inappropriate).

From 1960 till his retirement in 1969 Luitpold Steidle was mayor of Weimar, where afterwards he continued to live.

== Awards ==
Luitpold Steidle received the usual awards conferred on politicians by states with that use Honours Systems. He was also, in 1956, made an Honorary Senator of Greifswald University and, in 1972, an Honorary Member of the Presidential Council of the Kulturbund (Culture League).

== Publications ==
- Das Nationalkomitee Freies Deutschland, Burgscheidungen 1960
- Das Große Bündnis, Burgscheidungen 1963
- Entscheidung an der Wolga, Berlin 1969
- Dokumente Familienarchiv, Bayreuth, 2010
