= Christian Democratic Union (East Germany) =

Political party in East Germany

Christian Democratic Union of Germany Christlich-Demokratische Union Deutschlands
- Leader: Andreas Hermes (first); Lothar de Maizière (last)
- Founded: 26 June 1945
- Dissolved: 2 October 1990
- Merger of: Democratic Awakening
- Merged into: Christian Democratic Union
- Headquarters: East Berlin
- Newspaper: See list: Neue Zeit (federal); Der Demokrat; Der Neue Weg; Märkische Union; Thüringer Tageblatt; Die Union
- Membership (1987): 140,000
- Ideology: Post-Wende (after 1989): Christian democracy; German reunification; Pre-Wende (before 1989): Christian socialism; Bloc party politics
- National affiliation: Democratic Bloc (1945–1950); National Front (1950–1990); Alliance for Germany (1990)
- Colors: Blue; Yellow

Party flag

The Christian Democratic Union of Germany (German: Christlich-Demokratische Union Deutschlands, CDU) – also referred to as the East CDU or CDUD – was an East German political party founded in 1945. It was part of the National Front with the Socialist Unity Party and a bloc party until 1989.

It contested the free elections in 1990 as an arm of the West German Christian Democratic Union, into which it merged after German reunification later that same year.

== Party politics ==
CDU poster showing Otto Nuschke and reading 20 years of CDU and Christians in service of peace and Socialism

The CDU was originally very similar to its West German counterpart. Like the West German CDU, its support came mostly from devout middle class Christians. However, it was a little more left-leaning than the West German CDU.

Its first chairman was Andreas Hermes, who had been a prominent member of the Centre Party during the Weimar Republic and a three-time minister. He fled to the West in 1946 and was replaced by Jakob Kaiser, another former Centre Party member and a leading member of the resistance movement during World War II. Kaiser had been a prominent member of the Centre's left wing, and favoured nationalisation of heavy industries and a land distribution programme suggested by the Communists. However, his criticism of the Communists resulted in him being pushed out in 1947 in favour of the more pliant Otto Nuschke, a former member of the German Democratic Party.

Nuschke and his supporters gradually pushed out those CDU members who were not willing to do the Communists' bidding. This culminated at the Sixth Party Congress in 1952, at which it formally transformed itself into a loyal partner of the Communists. At this gathering, it declared itself "a Socialist party without any limitations" in accordance with the new line of "Christian realism".

In the 22 "Theses on Christian Realism", the CDU committed itself to the "Socialist reorganisation of Society" (1st edition, 1951). Emphasising the "exemplary realisation" of Karl Marx's "teaching on building a new, better social order" in the USSR, it was declared that Socialism offered at the time "the best opportunity for the realisation of Christ's demands and for exercising the practical Christianity". The programme also asserted the CDU's support for the working class' leading role in establishing socialism, a development which the party regarded from its 6th Congress onward as "historically necessary and consistent".

Its deputies, like all other East German parties, consistently voted for the government's proposals in the Volkskammer. The only exception was the vote on 9 March 1972 on the abortion law, when there were 14 "nays" and 8 absentees among the CDU deputies.

After Nuschke's death, August Bach, another former Democratic Party member, led the party for the remainder of the 1950s. In 1966 long-time general secretary Gerald Götting was elected chairman. Götting, who was chairman of the Volkskammer (and de facto vice president of the GDR) from 1969 to 1976, carried on and elaborated the pro-government line.

Götting remained chairman and a Socialist Unity Party ally until Erich Honecker was deposed in favour of Egon Krenz in October 1989. On 2 November 1989, Götting was deposed by inner party reformers. In December 1989 Lothar de Maizière, a lawyer and deputy chairman of the Evangelical Church Synod of East Germany, was elected chairman. From that point on the party deposed (and later expelled) its former top figures, and became the strongest proponent of speedy reunification with West Germany.

In March 1990, the CDU became the main element of the Alliance for Germany, a centre-right coalition. It won the first (and as it turned out, only) free general election and became the biggest party in the People's Chamber. In April de Maizière became prime minister of the GDR, heading a grand coalition that immediately set about reuniting the country with the West.

In August 1990, Democratic Awakening, a minor member of the governing coalition, merged into the East German CDU. The merger brought Democratic Awakening spokeswoman and future Chancellor of Germany Angela Merkel into the party.

In October 1990, the East German CDU merged into the West German CDU.

== Newspaper ==
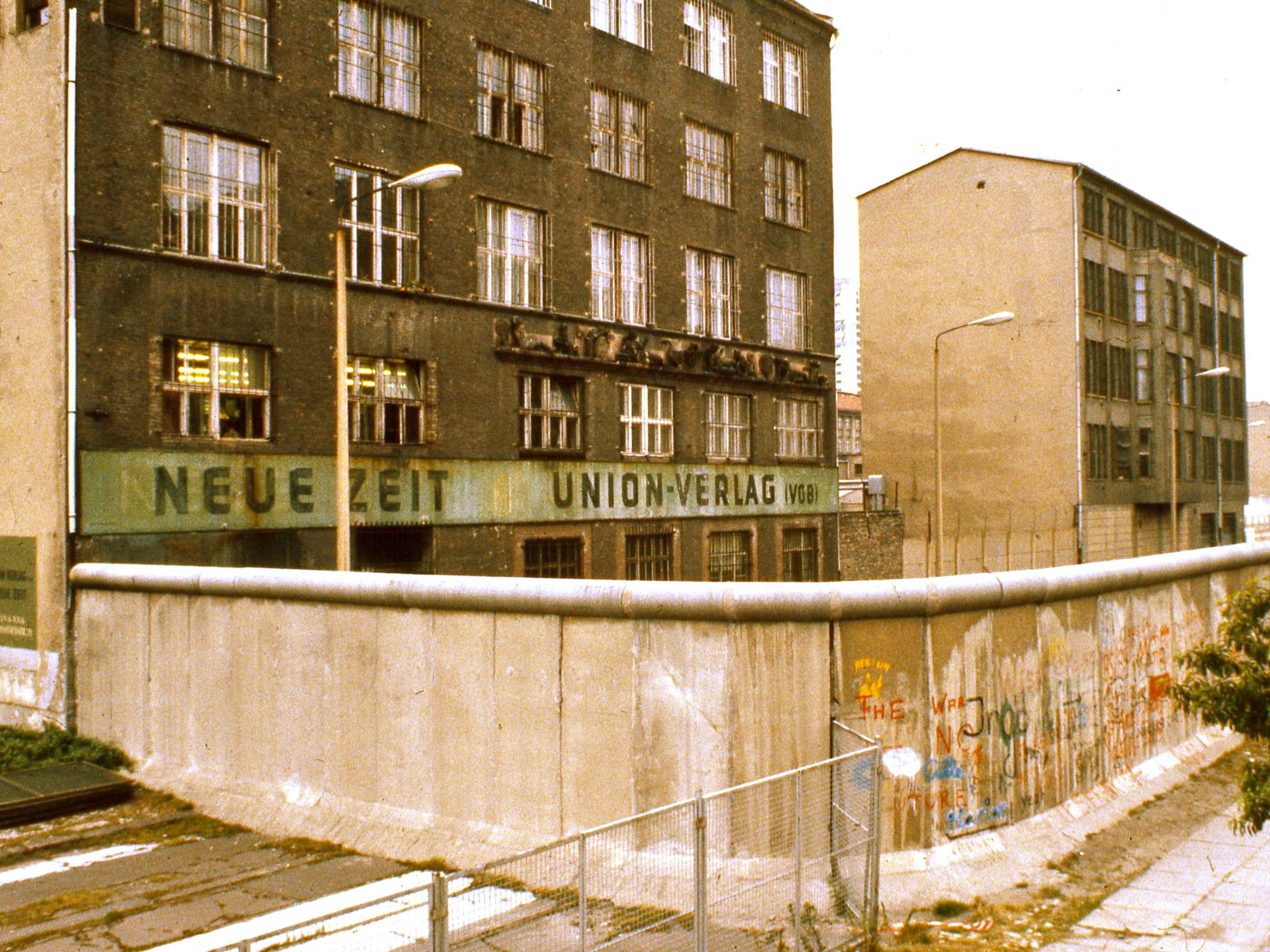
Exterior of Neue Zeit building, rear view, with the Berlin Wall in the foreground, 1984.

The official newspaper of the party was Neue Zeit, published by Union: Verlag.

== International relations ==
The CDU maintained close relations with other Christian concessional entities in the Soviet bloc. Relations with the state-scontrolled Catholic PAX Association in Poland and the Czechoslovak People's Party (CSL) were especially close. There were some contacts with individual members of the Italian Christian Democracy party (DC), the Belgian Christian People's Party (CVP) and Christian Social Party (PSC) and the Dutch Christian Democratic Appeal (CDA).

Although the East German CDU and its West German counterpart were often at odds with each other, they maintained official relations.

The East German Christian Democrats also had close relations with the Russian Orthodox Church.

== Chairmen ==
Name	Term
Andreas Hermes	1945
Jakob Kaiser	1945–1947
Otto Nuschke	1948–1957
August Bach	1957–1966
Gerald Götting	1966–1989
Wolfgang Heyl	1989 (acting)
Lothar de Maizière	1989–1990

== General secretaries ==
Name	Term
Georg Dertinger	1946–1949
Gerald Götting	1949–1966
Martin Kirchner	1989–1990

== East German CDU politicians ==
- Else Ackermann
- Sabine Bergmann-Pohl (Last Head of State of the GDR)
- Dieter Helm (later became the parliamentary leader for the CDU in the Landtag of Brandenburg)
- Emil Fuchs (Theologian)
- Karl Grobbel (co-founder of the Berlin Conference of European Catholics)
- Hubertus Guske (General Secretary of the Berlin Conference of European Catholics)
- Ernst Lemmer (co-chairman of the CDU in 1947)
- Angela Merkel (deputy spokesperson of Lothar de Maizière's government and the united Germany's first female Chancellor)
- Herbert Schirmer (Minister of Culture 1990)
- Max Sefrin (Deputy Prime Minister)
- Luitpold Steidle (Minister of Health Care)
- Heinrich Toeplitz (Supreme Court of the GDR)
- Heinz Winkler (Minister of Reconstruction)

== Electoral history ==
Election	Votes	%	Seats	+/–
1949	as part of Democratic Bloc		45 / 330 (Note: The 1,400 elected members of the Third German People's Congress selected the members of the second German People's Council.)	new
1950	as part of National Front		60 / 400	▲15
1954	as part of National Front		45 / 466	▼15
1958	as part of National Front		45 / 466	Steady
1963	as part of National Front		45 / 434	Steady
1967	as part of National Front		45 / 434	Steady
1971	as part of National Front		45 / 434	Steady
1976	as part of National Front		45 / 434	Steady
1981	as part of National Front		52 / 500	▲7
1986	as part of National Front		52 / 500	Steady
1990	4,710,598	40.8	163 / 400	▲111

== See also ==
- Politics of East Germany
- National Front (East Germany)
