= Märkische Union =

Former German newspaper

Märkische Union was a German newspaper, founded as the last CDU daily newspaper for Brandenburg, founded on February 3, 1948 with a license from SMAD. The news agency ADN reported the approval of the "occupying power" and named the newspaper title Märkische Union and Potsdam as the place of publication. The newspaper first appeared only three times a week. The then chairman of the CDU in the state of Brandenburg, Wilhelm Wolff, wrote in the first edition of the Märkische Union that Germany's unity remains the top priority.

The first publishing director was the deputy CDU state chairman from Brandenburg and, from November 1948, the first chairman of this bloc party in the state of Brandenburg, Karl Grobbel. The first editor-in - chief was Hans-Werner Gyßling and remained so until February 1949. From 1948 to 1950, Xaver Kugler was an editor at Märkische Union, who was previously a volunteer under Gyßling at the CDU newspaper Der Demokratie in Schwerin.

Gyßling's successor as editor-in-chief was Walter Schur until March 1951. Günter Wirth was editorial secretary at the Märkische Union from 1948 to 1950, worked for its cultural section for a year and a half and in 1961 became deputy editor-in-chief of Neue Zeit.

After the GDR districts were formed in 1952, it was supplied to readers in the territories of the districts of the same name: Cottbus, Frankfurt / Oder and Potsdam. The circulation in 1981 was around 41,000 copies. There was close cooperation between the editorial offices of the daily newspaper Die Union, Dresden, and the Märkische Union, Potsdam. The editors-in-chief of Die Union were also editors-in-chief of the Märkische Union newspaper from the 1950s until the Peaceful Revolution in 1989:

- Ursula Friedrich from 1958 to 1960,
- Karl-Friedrich Fuchs from 1960 to 1971,
- Johannes Hans Zillig from 1973 to 1977,
- Dieter Eberle from 1974 to 1977 and
- Fred Eismann from mid-1977 to 1989.

Editors of the regional CDU newspapers reported on local political and cultural events in the districts of the GDR, who also wrote articles on these topics for the CDU central organ Neue Zeit. The Märkische Union later converted into a weekly newspaper in March 1990.
