= Neue Zeit (East Germany) =

Daily newspaper in East Germany (1945–1994)

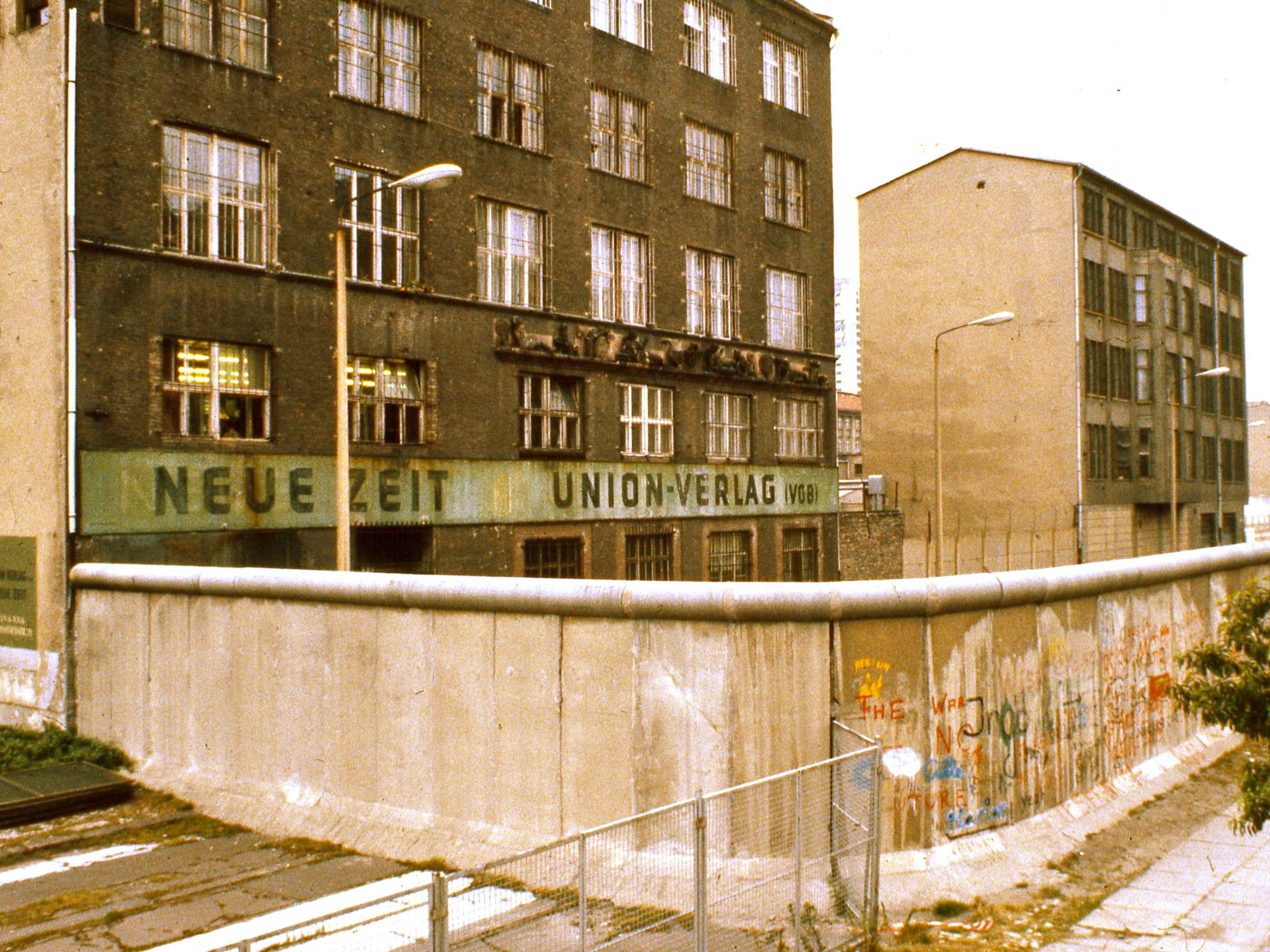
Exterior of Neue Zeit building, rear view, with the Berlin Wall in the foreground, 1984.

Neue Zeit was the official organ of the Christian Democratic Union of the German Democratic Republic, first published on 22 July 1945. The paper was published on a daily basis. It ceased publication on 5 July 1994.
